= Canton of Crocq =

Coordinates: 45°52′13″N 2°22′08″E

Crocq
- Former canton
- Interactive map of Crocq
- Country: France
- Region: Nouvelle-Aquitaine
- Department: Creuse
- No. of communes: {{{nbcomm}}}
- Disbanded: 2015
- Area: 263.46 km^{2} (101.72 sq mi)
- Population (2012): 2,903
  - Density: 11.02/km^{2} (28.54/sq mi)

The Canton of Crocq is a former canton situated in the Creuse département and in the Limousin region of central France. It was disbanded following the French canton reorganisation which came into effect in March 2015. It consisted of 14 communes, which joined the canton of Auzances in 2015. It had 2,903 inhabitants (2012).

== Geography ==
A farming area, with the town of Crocq, in the arrondissement of Aubusson, at its centre. The altitude varies from 540 m (1,770 ft) (La Villetelle) to 829 m (2,720 ft) (Crocq) with an average altitude of 716 m (2,349 ft).

The canton comprised 14 communes:

- Basville
- Crocq
- Flayat
- La Mazière-aux-Bons-Hommes
- Mérinchal
- Pontcharraud
- Saint-Agnant-près-Crocq
- Saint-Bard
- Saint-Georges-Nigremont
- Saint-Maurice-près-Crocq
- Saint-Oradoux-près-Crocq
- Saint-Pardoux-d'Arnet
- La Villeneuve
- La Villetelle

== Population ==
Historical population Canton of Crocq
Year	1962	1968	1975	1982	1990	1999
Pop.	4,471	4,849	4,601	4,178	3,606	3,230
±%	—	+8.5%	−5.1%	−9.2%	−13.7%	−10.4%
From the year 1962 on: No double counting – residents of multiple communes (e.g. students and military personnel) are counted only once. Source: INSEE

== See also ==
- Arrondissements of the Creuse department
- Cantons of the Creuse department
- Communes of the Creuse department
