= Communauté de communes du Haut Pays Marchois =

Coordinates: 45.8663°N 2.3688°E

Haut Pays Marchois
- Former communauté de communes
- Interactive map of Haut Pays Marchois
- Country: France
- Region: Nouvelle-Aquitaine
- Department: Creuse
- No. of communes: {{{nbcomm}}}
- Established: 2002
- Disbanded: 2017
- Population (1999): 3,182

The communauté de communes du Haut Pays Marchois was located in the Creuse département of the Limousin region of central France. It was created in January 2002. It was merged into the new Communauté de communes Marche et Combraille en Aquitaine in January 2017.

It comprised the following 13 communes:

- Basville
- Crocq
- Flayat
- La Mazière-aux-Bons-Hommes
- Mérinchal
- Pontcharraud
- Saint-Agnant-près-Crocq
- Saint-Bard
- Saint-Georges-Nigremont
- Saint-Maurice-près-Crocq
- Saint-Oradoux-près-Crocq
- Saint-Pardoux-d'Arnet
- La Villeneuve

== See also ==
- Communes of the Creuse department
