= Communauté de communes d'Auzances-Bellegarde =

Coordinates: 46.0259°N 2.5002°E

Auzances-Bellegarde
- Former communauté de communes
- Interactive map of Auzances-Bellegarde
- Country: France
- Region: Nouvelle-Aquitaine
- Department: Creuse
- No. of communes: {{{nbcomm}}}
- Established: 1996
- Disbanded: 2017
- Population (2013): 7,438

The communauté de communes d’Auzances-Bellegarde was created on December 27, 1995 and is located in the Creuse département of the Limousin region of central France. It was created in January 1996. It was merged into the new Communauté de communes Marche et Combraille en Aquitaine in January 2017.

It comprised the following 26 communes:

- Arfeuille-Châtain
- Auzances
- Bellegarde-en-Marche
- Bosroger
- Brousse
- Bussière-Nouvelle
- Champagnat
- Chard
- Charron
- Châtelard
- La Chaussade
- Le Compas
- Dontreix
- Fontanières
- Lioux-les-Monges
- Lupersat
- Mainsat
- Les Mars
- Mautes
- Reterre
- Rougnat
- Saint-Domet
- Saint-Silvain-Bellegarde
- Sannat
- Sermur
- La Serre-Bussière-Vieille

== See also ==
- Communes of the Creuse department
