= Canton of La Courtine =

Coordinates: 45°44′47″N 2°17′15″E

La Courtine
- Former canton
- Interactive map of La Courtine
- Country: France
- Region: Nouvelle-Aquitaine
- Department: Creuse
- No. of communes: {{{nbcomm}}}
- Disbanded: 2015
- Area: 228.33 km^{2} (88.16 sq mi)
- Population (2012): 1,678
  - Density: 7.349/km^{2} (19.03/sq mi)

The Canton of La Courtine is a former canton situated in the Creuse département and in the Limousin region of central France. It was disbanded following the French canton reorganisation which came into effect in March 2015. It consisted of 9 communes, which joined the canton of Auzances in 2015. It had 1,678 inhabitants (2012).

== Geography ==
A farming area, with the town of La Courtine, in the arrondissement of Aubusson, at its centre. The altitude varies from 595m (Clairavaux) to 936m (Saint-Oradoux-de-Chirouze) with an average altitude of 760m.

The canton comprised 9 communes:

- Beissat
- Clairavaux
- La Courtine
- Magnat-l'Étrange
- Malleret
- Le Mas-d'Artige
- Saint-Martial-le-Vieux
- Saint-Merd-la-Breuille
- Saint-Oradoux-de-Chirouze

== Population ==
Historical population Canton of La Courtine
Year	1962	1968	1975	1982	1990	1999
Pop.	2,665	2,939	2,529	2,098	2,038	1,943
±%	—	+10.3%	−14.0%	−17.0%	−2.9%	−4.7%
From the year 1962 on: No double counting – residents of multiple communes (e.g. students and military personnel) are counted only once. Source: INSEE

== See also ==
- Arrondissements of the Creuse department
- Cantons of the Creuse department
- Communes of the Creuse department
