= Communauté de communes des Sources de la Creuse =

Coordinates: 45.708°N 2.255°E

Sources de la Creuse
- Former communauté de communes
- Interactive map of Sources de la Creuse
- Country: France
- Region: Nouvelle-Aquitaine
- Department: Creuse
- No. of communes: {{{nbcomm}}}
- Established: 2002
- Disbanded: 2017
- Population (1999): 2,836

The communauté de communes des Sources de la Creuse was located in the Creuse département of the Limousin region of central France. It was created in January 2002. It was merged into the new Haute-Corrèze Communauté in January 2017.

It comprised the following 11 communes:

- Beissat
- Clairavaux
- La Courtine
- Féniers
- Magnat-l'Étrange
- Malleret
- Le Mas-d'Artige
- Poussanges
- Saint-Martial-le-Vieux
- Saint-Merd-la-Breuille
- Saint-Oradoux-de-Chirouze

== See also ==
- Communes of the Creuse department
