= Communauté de communes Marche et Combraille en Aquitaine =

Federation of municipalities in France

Marche et Combraille en Aquitaine
- Communauté de communes
- Interactive map of Marche et Combraille en Aquitaine
- Coordinates: 46°02′N 02°30′E
- Country: France
- Region: Nouvelle-Aquitaine
- Department: Creuse
- No. of communes: {{{nbcomm}}}
- Established: 2017
- Area: 964.8 km^{2} (372.5 sq mi)
- Population (2018): 13,476
  - Density: 13.97/km^{2} (36.18/sq mi)

The Communauté de communes Marche et Combraille en Aquitaine is a communauté de communes, an intercommunal structure, in the Creuse department, in the Nouvelle-Aquitaine region, central France. It was created in January 2017 by the merger of the former communautés de communes Chénérailles, Auzances-Bellegarde and Haut Pays Marchois. Its area is 964.8 km^{2}, and its population was 13,476 in 2018. Its seat is in Auzances.

== Communes ==
The communauté de communes consists of the following 50 communes:

1. Arfeuille-Châtain
2. Auzances
3. Basville
4. Bellegarde-en-Marche
5. Bosroger
6. Brousse
7. Bussière-Nouvelle
8. Champagnat
9. Chard
10. Charron
11. Châtelard
12. Le Chauchet
13. La Chaussade
14. Chénérailles
15. Le Compas
16. Crocq
17. Dontreix
18. Flayat
19. Fontanières
20. Issoudun-Létrieix
21. Lavaveix-les-Mines
22. Lioux-les-Monges
23. Lupersat
24. Mainsat
25. Les Mars
26. Mautes
27. La Mazière-aux-Bons-Hommes
28. Mérinchal
29. Peyrat-la-Nonière
30. Pontcharraud
31. Puy-Malsignat
32. Reterre
33. Rougnat
34. Saint-Agnant-près-Crocq
35. Saint-Bard
36. Saint-Chabrais
37. Saint-Dizier-la-Tour
38. Saint-Domet
39. Saint-Georges-Nigremont
40. Saint-Maurice-près-Crocq
41. Saint-Médard-la-Rochette
42. Saint-Oradoux-près-Crocq
43. Saint-Pardoux-d'Arnet
44. Saint-Pardoux-les-Cards
45. Saint-Priest
46. Saint-Silvain-Bellegarde
47. Sannat
48. Sermur
49. La Serre-Bussière-Vieille
50. La Villeneuve
