= Château fort de Puyravaux =

Castle in Nouvelle-Aquitaine, France

The Château fort de Puyravaux is a ruined feudal castle in the commune of Clairavaux in the Creuse département of France. It was built of granite but its date of construction is unknown, as is its exact location. It was probably destroyed around the middle of the 15th century.

== See also ==
- List of castles in France
