= Charron, Creuse =

Commune in Nouvelle-Aquitaine, France

Charron
- Commune
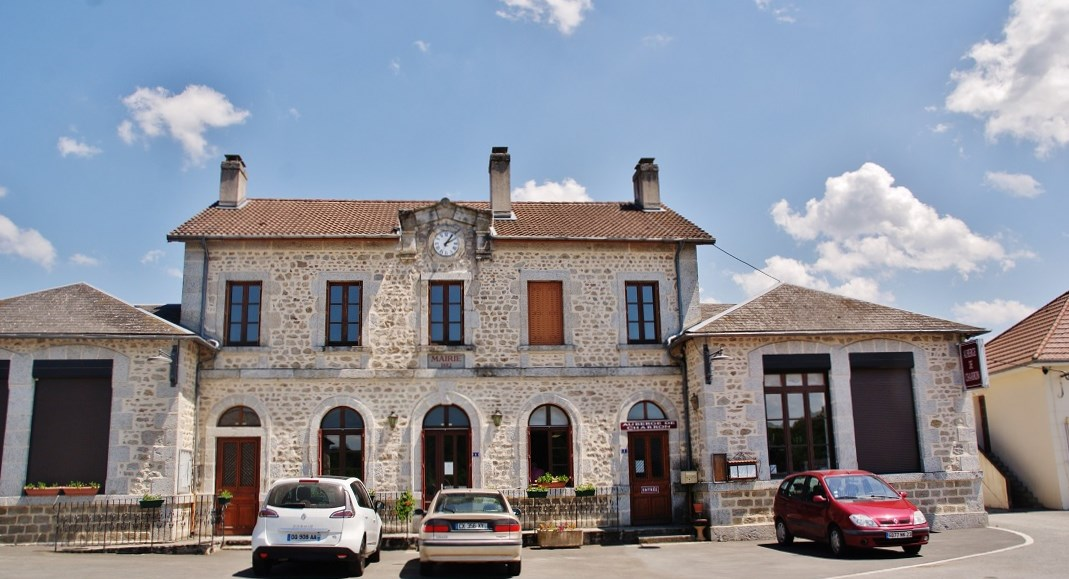
- Town hall
- Location of Charron
- Location within France Location within Nouvelle-Aquitaine
- Coordinates: 46°03′38″N 2°33′49″E
- Country: France
- Region: Nouvelle-Aquitaine
- Department: Creuse
- Arrondissement: Aubusson
- Canton: Auzances
- Intercommunality: CC Marche et Combraille en Aquitaine

Government
  - Mayor (2020–2026): Émilie Bouchet
- Area^{1}: 30.11 km^{2} (11.63 sq mi)
- Elevation: 520 m (1,710 ft)
- Highest elevation: 705 m (2,313 ft)
- Lowest elevation: 390 m (1,280 ft)
- Population (2023): 195
  - Density: 6.48/km^{2} (16.8/sq mi)
- Time zone: UTC+01:00 (CET)
  - Summer (DST): UTC+02:00 (CEST)
- INSEE/Postal code: 23054 /23700
- ^{1} French Land Register data, which excludes lakes, ponds, glaciers > 1 km^{2} (0.386 sq mi or 247 acres) and river estuaries.

Charron (French pronunciation: [ʃaʁɔ̃]; Occitan: Charoms) is a commune in the Creuse department in the Nouvelle-Aquitaine region in central France.

== Geography ==
An area of forestry and farming comprising the village and several hamlets, situated by the banks of the river Pampeluze, the border with the department of Allier, some 21 miles (34 km) northeast of Aubusson at the junctions of the D4a, D511 and the D998 roads.

== Population ==
Historical population
Year	Pop.	±% p.a.
1968	469	—
1975	405	−2.07%
1982	349	−2.10%
1990	281	−2.67%
1999	226	−2.39%
2007	239	+0.70%
2012	218	−1.82%
2017	232	+1.25%
2023	195	−2.85%
Source: INSEE

== Sights ==
- The church of St. Martin, dating from the nineteenth century.

== See also ==
- Communes of the Creuse department
