= Brousse, Creuse =

Commune in Nouvelle-Aquitaine, France

Brousse
- Commune
- Location of Brousse
- Location within France Location within Nouvelle-Aquitaine
- Coordinates: 45°58′22″N 2°27′24″E
- Country: France
- Region: Nouvelle-Aquitaine
- Department: Creuse
- Arrondissement: Aubusson
- Canton: Auzances
- Intercommunality: CC Marche et Combraille en Aquitaine

Government
  - Mayor (2020–2026): Brice Simonet
- Area^{1}: 3.63 km^{2} (1.40 sq mi)
- Elevation: 490 m (1,610 ft)
- Highest elevation: 739 m (2,425 ft)
- Lowest elevation: 595 m (1,952 ft)
- Population (2023): 32
  - Density: 8.8/km^{2} (23/sq mi)
- Time zone: UTC+01:00 (CET)
  - Summer (DST): UTC+02:00 (CEST)
- INSEE/Postal code: 23034 /23700
- ^{1} French Land Register data, which excludes lakes, ponds, glaciers > 1 km^{2} (0.386 sq mi or 247 acres) and river estuaries.

Brousse (French pronunciation: [bʁus]; Occitan: Brossa) is a commune in the Creuse department in the Nouvelle-Aquitaine region in central France.

== Geography ==
A very small forestry and farming village situated just 15 miles (24 km) east of Aubusson on the D996 road.

== Population ==
Historical population
Year	Pop.	±% p.a.
1968	47	—
1975	39	−2.63%
1982	39	+0.00%
1990	32	−2.44%
1999	36	+1.32%
2007	27	−3.53%
2012	24	−2.33%
2017	27	+2.38%
2023	32	+2.87%
Source: INSEE

== Sights ==
- The church, dating from the thirteenth century.
- The castle, dating from the fifteenth century.

== See also ==
- Communes of the Creuse department
