= Châtelard, Creuse =

Commune in Nouvelle-Aquitaine, France

Châtelard
- Commune
- Location of Châtelard
- Location within France Location within Nouvelle-Aquitaine
- Coordinates: 45°57′54″N 2°28′08″E
- Country: France
- Region: Nouvelle-Aquitaine
- Department: Creuse
- Arrondissement: Aubusson
- Canton: Auzances
- Intercommunality: CC Marche et Combraille en Aquitaine

Government
  - Mayor (2020–2026): Muriel Cotentin née Lebour
- Area^{1}: 2.42 km^{2} (0.93 sq mi)
- Elevation: 503 m (1,650 ft)
- Highest elevation: 726 m (2,382 ft)
- Lowest elevation: 597 m (1,959 ft)
- Population (2023): 29
  - Density: 12/km^{2} (31/sq mi)
- Time zone: UTC+01:00 (CET)
  - Summer (DST): UTC+02:00 (CEST)
- INSEE/Postal code: 23055 /23700
- ^{1} French Land Register data, which excludes lakes, ponds, glaciers > 1 km^{2} (0.386 sq mi or 247 acres) and river estuaries.

Châtelard (French pronunciation: [ʃatlaʁ]; Occitan: Chastelar) is a commune in the Creuse department in the Nouvelle-Aquitaine region in central France.

== Geography ==
The smallest commune of the department; a farming village situated some 13 miles (21 km) east of Aubusson on the D27a road.

== Population ==
Historical population
Year	Pop.	±% p.a.
1968	38	—
1975	30	−3.32%
1982	23	−3.72%
1990	35	+5.39%
1999	39	+1.21%
2007	34	−1.70%
2012	32	−1.21%
2017	32	+0.00%
2023	29	−1.63%
Source: INSEE

== Sights ==
- The chapel, rebuilt in the twentieth century
- A menhir, the Pierre du Loup (wolf stone), in the forest

== Personalities ==
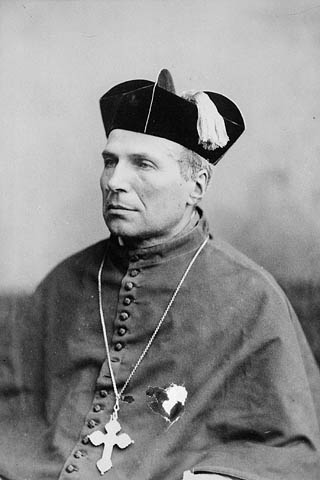
Jean-Francois Jamot

- Jean-Francois Jamot (1828–1886) was born here. He became the first bishop of Peterborough, Ontario, Canada.

== See also ==
- Communes of the Creuse department
