= Dontreix =

Commune in Nouvelle-Aquitaine, France

- Commune
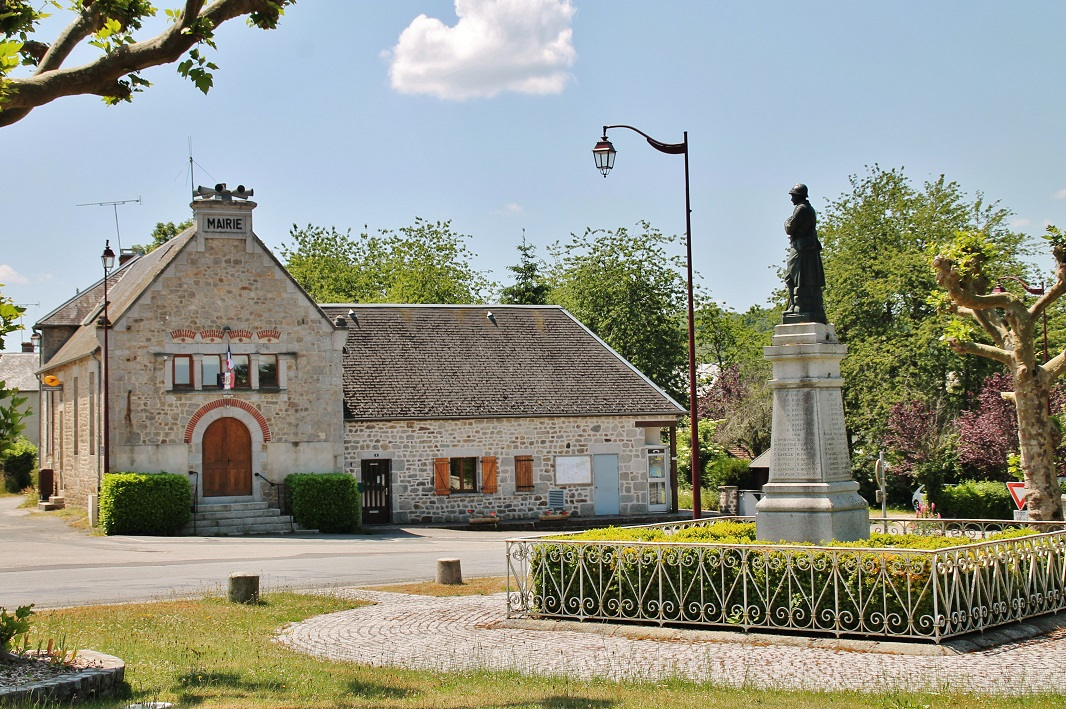
- Town hall

- Coat of arms
- Location of Dontreix
- Location within France Location within Nouvelle-Aquitaine
- Coordinates: 45°59′16″N 2°33′37″E
- Country: France
- Region: Nouvelle-Aquitaine
- Department: Creuse
- Arrondissement: Aubusson
- Canton: Auzances
- Intercommunality: CC Marche et Combraille en Aquitaine

Government
  - Mayor (2020–2026): Denis Richin
- Area^{1}: 47.45 km^{2} (18.32 sq mi)
- Elevation: 643 m (2,110 ft)
- Highest elevation: 753 m (2,470 ft)
- Lowest elevation: 510 m (1,670 ft)
- Population (2023): 400
  - Density: 8.4/km^{2} (22/sq mi)
- Time zone: UTC+01:00 (CET)
  - Summer (DST): UTC+02:00 (CEST)
- INSEE/Postal code: 23073 /23700
- ^{1} French Land Register data, which excludes lakes, ponds, glaciers > 1 km^{2} (0.386 sq mi or 247 acres) and river estuaries.

Dontreix (French pronunciation: [dɔ̃tʁɛ]; Occitan: Dontrés) is a commune in the Creuse department in the Nouvelle-Aquitaine region in central France.

== Geography ==
An area of lakes and streams, forestry and farming comprising the village and several hamlets some 19 miles (31 km) east of Aubusson at the junction of the D4, D91 and the D92 roads. On its eastern side, the commune borders the department of Puy-de-Dôme

== Population ==
Historical population
Year	Pop.	±% p.a.
1968	730	—
1975	608	−2.58%
1982	568	−0.97%
1990	455	−2.73%
1999	419	−0.91%
2007	397	−0.67%
2012	393	−0.20%
2017	415	+1.10%
2023	400	−0.61%
Source: INSEE

== Sights ==
- The twelfth-century church.
- Traces of two feudal castles at Matroux and Beaulieu.
- Roman remains (possibly an altar).
- A Megalith, the roc de Saint Julien, in the forest of Drouilles.

== See also ==
- Communes of the Creuse department
