= Saint-Oradoux-près-Crocq =

Commune in Nouvelle-Aquitaine, France

- Commune
- Location of Saint-Oradoux-près-Crocq
- Location within France Location within Nouvelle-Aquitaine
- Coordinates: 45°52′45″N 2°23′20″E
- Country: France
- Region: Nouvelle-Aquitaine
- Department: Creuse
- Arrondissement: Aubusson
- Canton: Auzances
- Intercommunality: CC Marche et Combraille en Aquitaine

Government
  - Mayor (2023–2026): Elodie Breuil
- Area^{1}: 13.36 km^{2} (5.16 sq mi)
- Elevation: 700 m (2,300 ft)
- Highest elevation: 772 m (2,533 ft)
- Lowest elevation: 614 m (2,014 ft)
- Population (2023): 109
  - Density: 8.16/km^{2} (21.1/sq mi)
- Time zone: UTC+01:00 (CET)
  - Summer (DST): UTC+02:00 (CEST)
- INSEE/Postal code: 23225 /23260
- ^{1} French Land Register data, which excludes lakes, ponds, glaciers > 1 km^{2} (0.386 sq mi or 247 acres) and river estuaries.

Saint-Oradoux-près-Crocq (French pronunciation: [sɛ̃.t‿ɔʁadu pʁɛ kʁo], literally Saint-Oradoux near Crocq; Occitan: Sent Orador de Cròc) is a commune in the Creuse department in central France.

== Geography ==
The river Tardes forms most of the commune's southwestern border.

== Population ==
Historical population
Year	Pop.	±% p.a.
1968	190	—
1975	175	−1.17%
1982	153	−1.90%
1990	134	−1.64%
1999	124	−0.86%
2007	118	−0.62%
2012	116	−0.34%
2017	97	−3.51%
2023	109	+1.96%
Source: INSEE

== See also ==
- Communes of the Creuse department
