= Les Mars =

Commune in Nouvelle-Aquitaine, France

- Commune
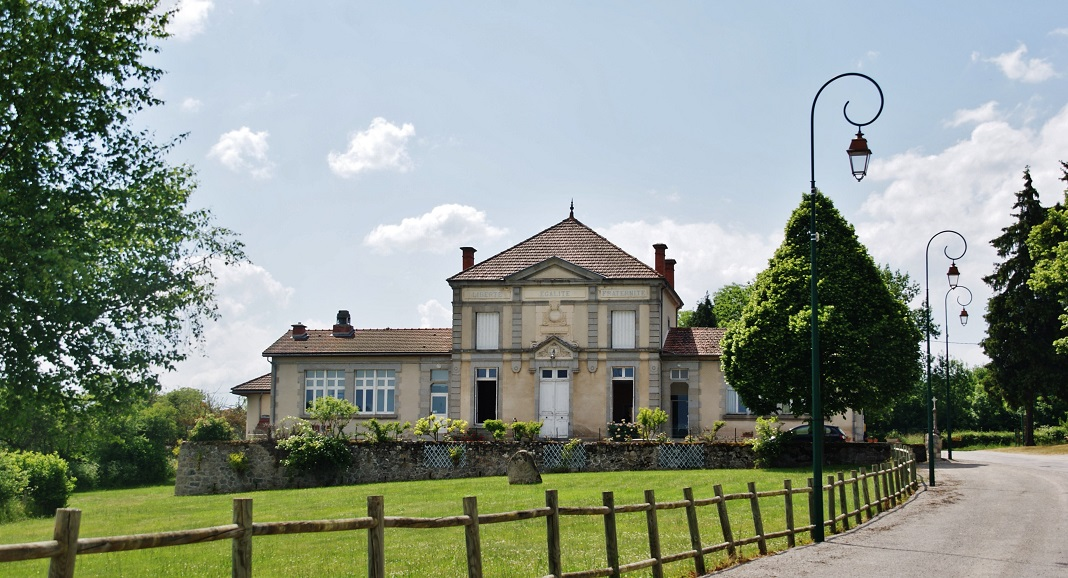
- Town hall
- Location of Les Mars
- Location within France Location within Nouvelle-Aquitaine
- Coordinates: 45°58′56″N 2°28′46″E
- Country: France
- Region: Nouvelle-Aquitaine
- Department: Creuse
- Arrondissement: Aubusson
- Canton: Auzances
- Intercommunality: CC Marche et Combraille en Aquitaine

Government
  - Mayor (2022–2026): Michel Mazet
- Area^{1}: 12.90 km^{2} (4.98 sq mi)
- Elevation: 593 m (1,946 ft)
- Highest elevation: 657 m (2,156 ft)
- Lowest elevation: 513 m (1,683 ft)
- Population (2023): 180
  - Density: 14/km^{2} (36/sq mi)
- Time zone: UTC+01:00 (CET)
  - Summer (DST): UTC+02:00 (CEST)
- INSEE/Postal code: 23123 /23700
- ^{1} French Land Register data, which excludes lakes, ponds, glaciers > 1 km^{2} (0.386 sq mi or 247 acres) and river estuaries.

Les Mars (Occitan: Marte) is a commune in the Creuse department in the Nouvelle-Aquitaine region in central France.

== Geography ==
A farming area comprising a small village and several hamlets, situated some 16 miles (26 km) east of Aubusson, at the junction of the D27 and the D996 roads.

== Population ==
Historical population
Year	Pop.	±% p.a.
1968	372	—
1975	344	−1.11%
1982	295	−2.17%
1990	274	−0.92%
1999	219	−2.46%
2007	209	−0.58%
2012	196	−1.28%
2017	195	−0.10%
2023	180	−1.33%
Source: INSEE

== Sights ==
- The thirteenth-century church.
- A restored feudal castle.
- The Château de Cherdon, at Chez-Redon.

== See also ==
- Communes of the Creuse department
