= Saint-Maurice-près-Crocq =

Commune in Nouvelle-Aquitaine, France

- Commune
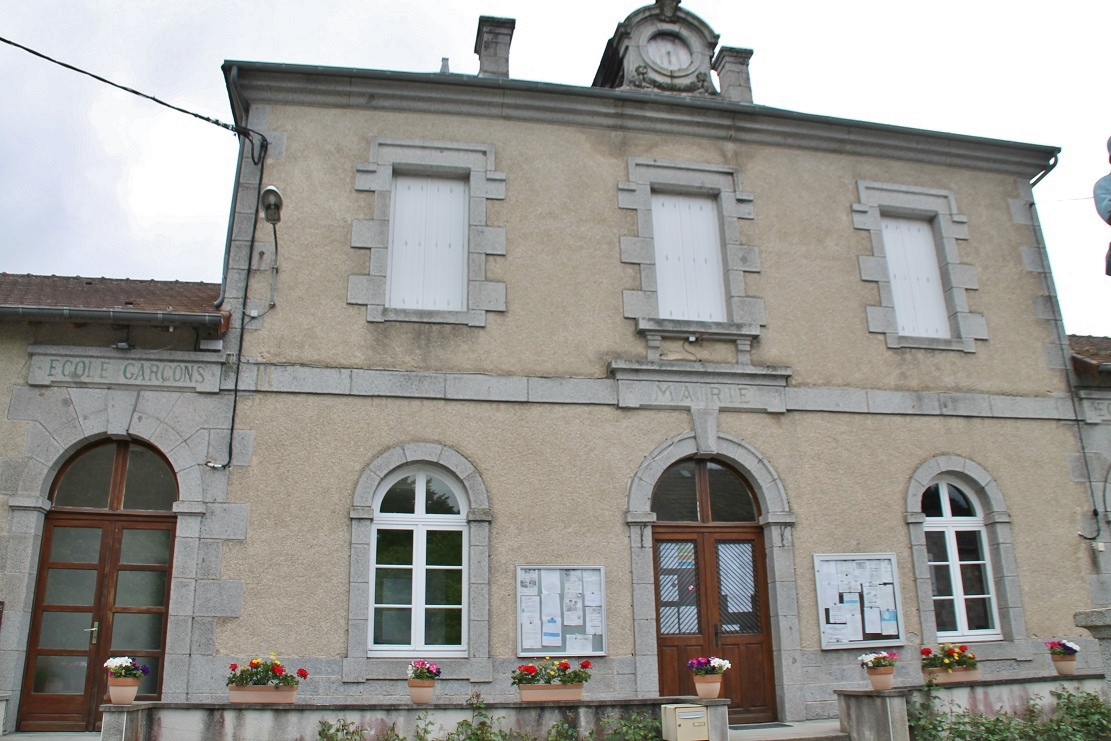
- Town hall
- Location of Saint-Maurice-près-Crocq
- Location within France Location within Nouvelle-Aquitaine
- Coordinates: 45°52′27″N 2°19′39″E
- Country: France
- Region: Nouvelle-Aquitaine
- Department: Creuse
- Arrondissement: Aubusson
- Canton: Auzances
- Intercommunality: CC Marche et Combraille en Aquitaine

Government
  - Mayor (2020–2026): Maryline Brunet
- Area^{1}: 14.1 km^{2} (5.4 sq mi)
- Elevation: 700 m (2,300 ft)
- Highest elevation: 725 m (2,379 ft)
- Lowest elevation: 592 m (1,942 ft)
- Population (2023): 104
  - Density: 7.38/km^{2} (19.1/sq mi)
- Time zone: UTC+01:00 (CET)
  - Summer (DST): UTC+02:00 (CEST)
- INSEE/Postal code: 23218 /23260
- ^{1} French Land Register data, which excludes lakes, ponds, glaciers > 1 km^{2} (0.386 sq mi or 247 acres) and river estuaries.

Saint-Maurice-près-Crocq (French: [sɛ̃ mɔʁis pʁɛ kʁo]; literally "Saint-Maurice near Crocq"; Occitan: Sent Maurici de Cròc) is a commune in the Creuse department in central France.

== Population ==
Historical population
Year	Pop.	±% p.a.
1968	225	—
1975	210	−0.98%
1982	158	−3.98%
1990	130	−2.41%
1999	115	−1.35%
2007	119	+0.43%
2012	109	−1.74%
2017	100	−1.71%
2023	104	+0.66%
Source: INSEE

== See also ==
- Communes of the Creuse department
