= Lioux-les-Monges =

Commune in Nouvelle-Aquitaine, France

- Commune
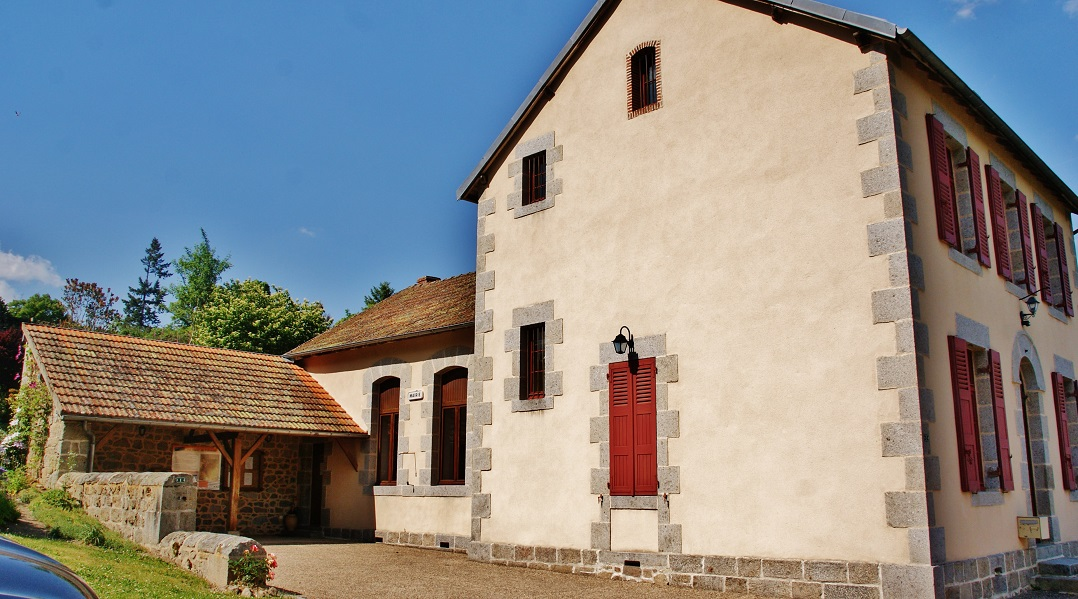
- Town hall

- Coat of arms
- Location of Lioux-les-Monges
- Location within France Location within Nouvelle-Aquitaine
- Coordinates: 45°57′09″N 2°27′22″E
- Country: France
- Region: Nouvelle-Aquitaine
- Department: Creuse
- Arrondissement: Aubusson
- Canton: Auzances
- Intercommunality: CC Marche et Combraille en Aquitaine

Government
  - Mayor (2020–2026): Jacques Payard
- Area^{1}: 7.32 km^{2} (2.83 sq mi)
- Elevation: 645 m (2,116 ft)
- Highest elevation: 764 m (2,507 ft)
- Lowest elevation: 633 m (2,077 ft)
- Population (2023): 51
  - Density: 7.0/km^{2} (18/sq mi)
- Time zone: UTC+01:00 (CET)
  - Summer (DST): UTC+02:00 (CEST)
- INSEE/Postal code: 23110 /23700
- ^{1} French Land Register data, which excludes lakes, ponds, glaciers > 1 km^{2} (0.386 sq mi or 247 acres) and river estuaries.

Lioux-les-Monges (French pronunciation: [lju le mɔ̃ʒ]; Occitan: Lion las Monjas) is a commune in the Creuse department in the Nouvelle-Aquitaine region in central France.

== Geography ==
A farming area comprising a very small village and several hamlets, situated some 14 miles (23 km) east of Aubusson, just off the D996 road.

== Population ==
Historical population
Year	Pop.	±% p.a.
1968	98	—
1975	73	−4.12%
1982	48	−5.81%
1990	40	−2.25%
1999	42	+0.54%
2007	47	+1.42%
2012	52	+2.04%
2017	57	+1.85%
2023	51	−1.84%
Source: INSEE

== Sights ==
- The twelfth-century church.

== See also ==
- Communes of the Creuse department
