= Sermur =

Commune in Nouvelle-Aquitaine, France

- Commune
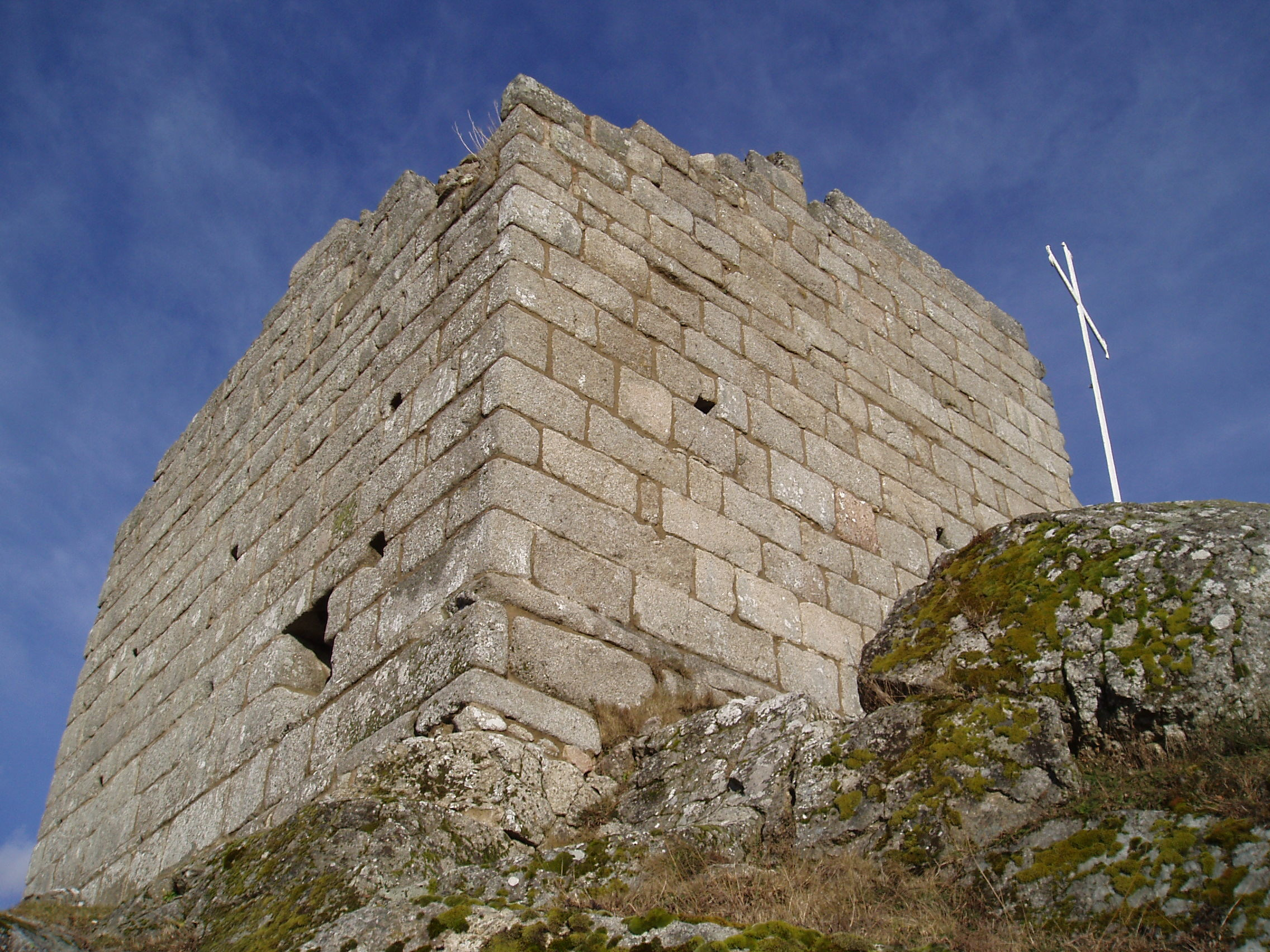
- The remains of the Tower of Sermur
- Location of Sermur
- Location within France Location within Nouvelle-Aquitaine
- Coordinates: 45°58′34″N 2°25′55″E
- Country: France
- Region: Nouvelle-Aquitaine
- Department: Creuse
- Arrondissement: Aubusson
- Canton: Auzances
- Intercommunality: CC Marche et Combraille en Aquitaine

Government
  - Mayor (2020–2026): Pierre Faucher
- Area^{1}: 19.50 km^{2} (7.53 sq mi)
- Elevation: 720 m (2,360 ft)
- Highest elevation: 725 m (2,379 ft)
- Lowest elevation: 607 m (1,991 ft)
- Population (2023): 102
  - Density: 5.23/km^{2} (13.5/sq mi)
- Time zone: UTC+01:00 (CET)
  - Summer (DST): UTC+02:00 (CEST)
- INSEE/Postal code: 23171 /23700
- ^{1} French Land Register data, which excludes lakes, ponds, glaciers > 1 km^{2} (0.386 sq mi or 247 acres) and river estuaries.

Sermur (French pronunciation: [sɛʁmyʁ]) is a commune in the Creuse department in the Nouvelle-Aquitaine region in central France.

== Geography ==
An area of lakes and streams, farming and forestry comprising the village and several hamlets situated some 14 miles (23 km) east of Aubusson, near the junction of the D25 and the D38 roads.

== Population ==
Historical population
Year	Pop.	±% p.a.
1968	238	—
1975	209	−1.84%
1982	155	−4.18%
1990	139	−1.35%
1999	128	−0.91%
2007	91	−4.17%
2012	120	+5.69%
2017	133	+2.08%
2023	102	−4.33%
Source: INSEE

== Sights ==
- The church, dating from the nineteenth century.
- The ruined tower, the only remains of an eleventh-century castle.

== See also ==
- Communes of the Creuse department
