= Chard, Creuse =

Commune in Nouvelle-Aquitaine, France

Chard
- Commune
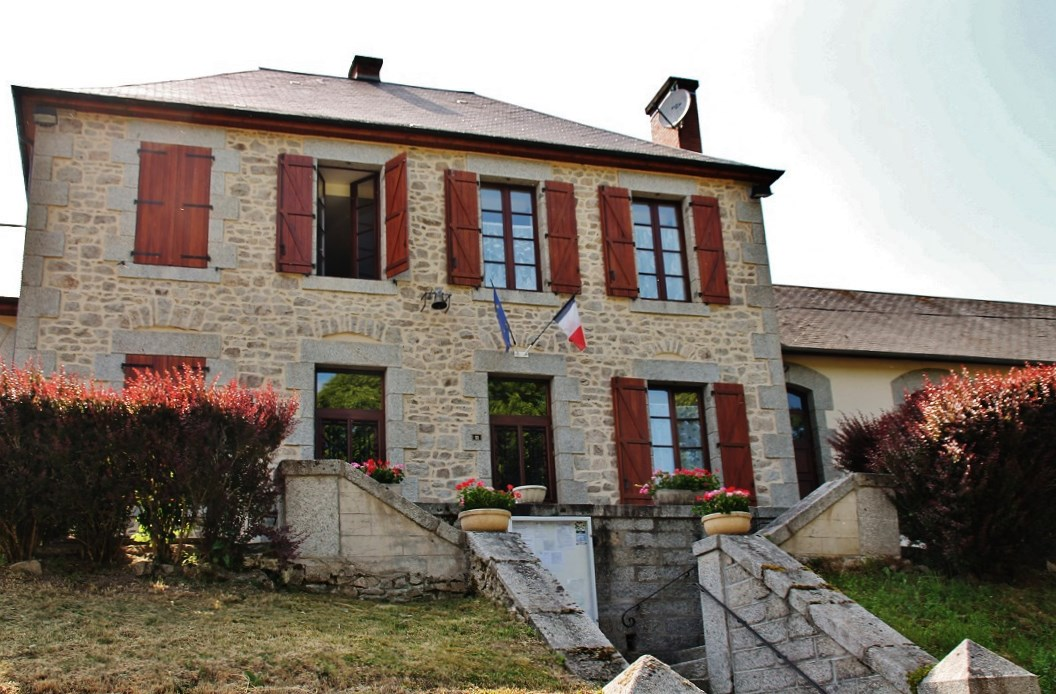
- Chard Town hall
- Location of Chard
- Location within France Location within Nouvelle-Aquitaine
- Coordinates: 45°56′43″N 2°28′41″E
- Country: France
- Region: Nouvelle-Aquitaine
- Department: Creuse
- Arrondissement: Aubusson
- Canton: Auzances
- Intercommunality: CC Marche et Combraille en Aquitaine

Government
  - Mayor (2020–2026): Serge Perrier
- Area^{1}: 14.12 km^{2} (5.45 sq mi)
- Elevation: 650 m (2,130 ft)
- Highest elevation: 776 m (2,546 ft)
- Lowest elevation: 577 m (1,893 ft)
- Population (2023): 206
  - Density: 14.6/km^{2} (37.8/sq mi)
- Time zone: UTC+01:00 (CET)
  - Summer (DST): UTC+02:00 (CEST)
- INSEE/Postal code: 23053 /23700
- ^{1} French Land Register data, which excludes lakes, ponds, glaciers > 1 km^{2} (0.386 sq mi or 247 acres) and river estuaries.

Chard (French pronunciation: [ʃaʁ]; Occitan: Chàrd) is a commune in the Creuse department in the Nouvelle-Aquitaine region in central France.

== Geography ==
An area of lakes, forestry and farming comprising the village and several hamlets, situated by the banks of the river Cher, some 15 miles (24 km) east of Aubusson on the D27 road.

== Population ==
Historical population
| Year | Pop. | ±% p.a. |
|---|---|---|
| 1968 | 282 | — |
| 1975 | 261 | −1.10% |
| 1982 | 215 | −2.73% |
| 1990 | 204 | −0.65% |
| 1999 | 173 | −1.81% |
| 2007 | 194 | +1.44% |
| 2012 | 203 | +0.91% |
| 2017 | 211 | +0.78% |
| 2023 | 206 | −0.40% |
Source: INSEE

== Sights ==
- A Roman villa.
- The church, dating from the thirteenth century.
- The fifteenth century castle of Chard.

== See also ==
- Communes of the Creuse department
