= Saint-Agnant-près-Crocq =

Commune in Nouvelle-Aquitaine, France

- Commune
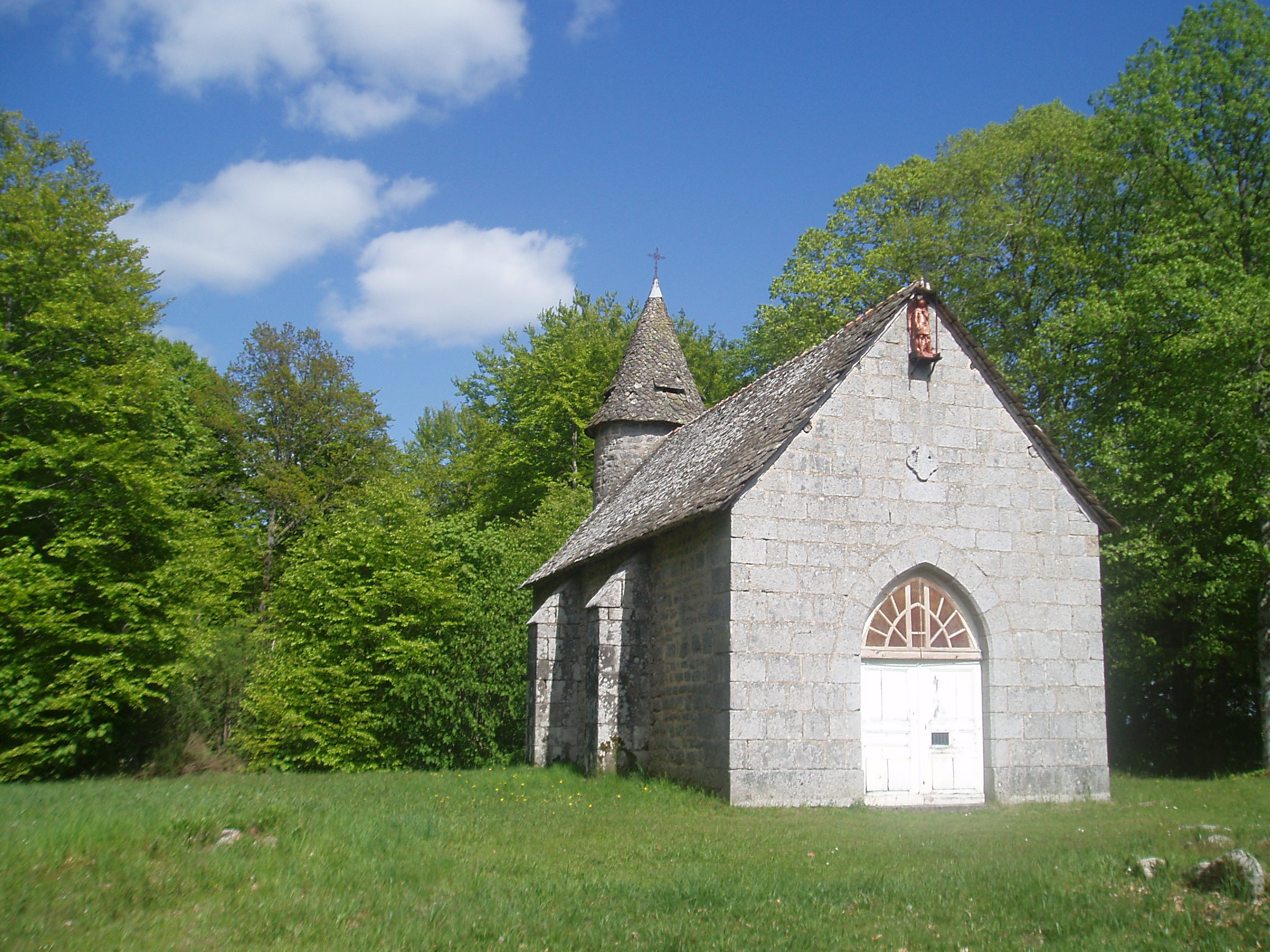
- The chapel of Saint-Michel in Saint-Agnant-près-Crocq
- Location of Saint-Agnant-près-Crocq
- Location within France Location within Nouvelle-Aquitaine
- Coordinates: 45°48′14″N 2°21′02″E
- Country: France
- Region: Nouvelle-Aquitaine
- Department: Creuse
- Arrondissement: Aubusson
- Canton: Auzances
- Intercommunality: CC Marche et Combraille en Aquitaine

Government
  - Mayor (2020–2026): Jean-Paul Welzer
- Area^{1}: 25.51 km^{2} (9.85 sq mi)
- Elevation: 730 m (2,400 ft)
- Highest elevation: 824 m (2,703 ft)
- Lowest elevation: 650 m (2,130 ft)
- Population (2023): 193
  - Density: 7.57/km^{2} (19.6/sq mi)
- Time zone: UTC+01:00 (CET)
  - Summer (DST): UTC+02:00 (CEST)
- INSEE/Postal code: 23178 /23260
- ^{1} French Land Register data, which excludes lakes, ponds, glaciers > 1 km^{2} (0.386 sq mi or 247 acres) and river estuaries.

Saint-Agnant-près-Crocq (French pronunciation: [sɛ̃.t‿aɲɑ̃ pʁɛ kʁɔk], literally Saint-Agnant near Crocq; Auvergnat: Sent Anhan de Cròc) is a commune in the Creuse department in central France.

== Population ==
Historical population
Year	Pop.	±% p.a.
1968	373	—
1975	294	−3.34%
1982	247	−2.46%
1990	209	−2.07%
1999	199	−0.54%
2007	202	+0.19%
2012	206	+0.39%
2017	184	−2.23%
2023	193	+0.80%
Source: INSEE

== See also ==
- Communes of the Creuse department
