= Bussière-Nouvelle =

Commune in Nouvelle-Aquitaine, France

- Commune
- Location of Bussière-Nouvelle
- Location within France Location within Nouvelle-Aquitaine
- Coordinates: 46°01′12″N 2°25′38″E
- Country: France
- Region: Nouvelle-Aquitaine
- Department: Creuse
- Arrondissement: Aubusson
- Canton: Auzances
- Intercommunality: CC Marche et Combraille en Aquitaine

Government
  - Mayor (2020–2026): Angéline Brun
- Area^{1}: 8.52 km^{2} (3.29 sq mi)
- Elevation: 616 m (2,021 ft)
- Highest elevation: 687 m (2,254 ft)
- Lowest elevation: 571 m (1,873 ft)
- Population (2023): 73
  - Density: 8.6/km^{2} (22/sq mi)
- Time zone: UTC+01:00 (CET)
  - Summer (DST): UTC+02:00 (CEST)
- INSEE/Postal code: 23037 /23700
- ^{1} French Land Register data, which excludes lakes, ponds, glaciers > 1 km^{2} (0.386 sq mi or 247 acres) and river estuaries.

Bussière-Nouvelle (French pronunciation: [bysjɛʁ nuvɛl]; Occitan: Bussiera Novela) is a commune in the Creuse department in the Nouvelle-Aquitaine region in central France.

== Geography ==
An area of lakes, forestry and farming comprising a small village and two hamlets, situated some 15 miles (24 km) northeast of Aubusson near the junction of the D998 and the D27 roads.

== Population ==
Historical population
Year	Pop.	±% p.a.
1968	165	—
1975	141	−2.22%
1982	130	−1.15%
1990	113	−1.74%
1999	105	−0.81%
2007	112	+0.81%
2012	105	−1.28%
2017	85	−4.14%
2023	73	−2.50%
Source: INSEE

== Sights ==
- The church of St.Madeleine, dating from the thirteenth century.
- The church at Blavepeyre, dating from the sixteenth century.
- A megalith at Coudeleix.

== See also ==
- Communes of the Creuse department
