= Le Compas =

Commune in Nouvelle-Aquitaine, France

- Commune
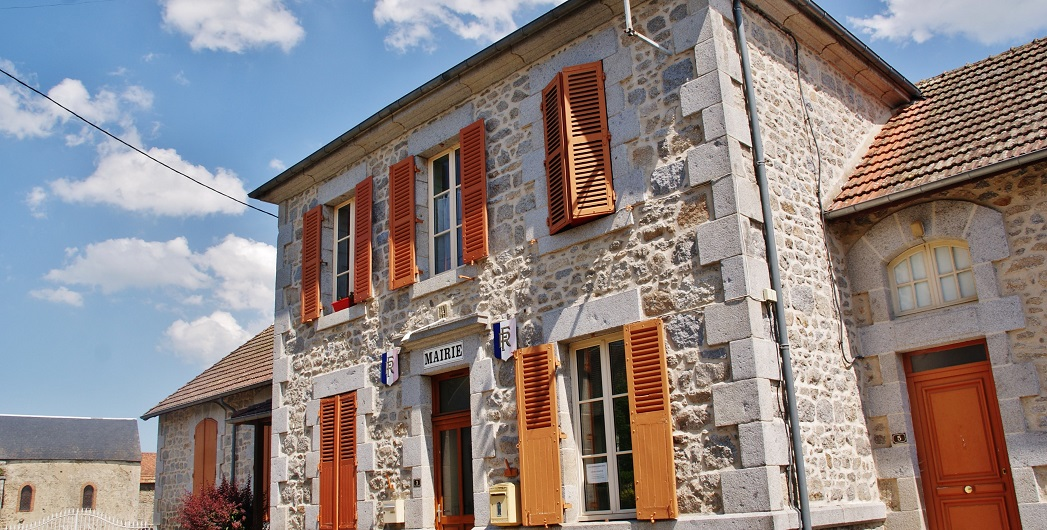
- Town hall
- Location of Le Compas
- Location within France Location within Nouvelle-Aquitaine
- Coordinates: 45°59′48″N 2°27′46″E
- Country: France
- Region: Nouvelle-Aquitaine
- Department: Creuse
- Arrondissement: Aubusson
- Canton: Auzances
- Intercommunality: CC Marche et Combraille en Aquitaine

Government
  - Mayor (2020–2026): Christian Payard
- Area^{1}: 16.54 km^{2} (6.39 sq mi)
- Elevation: 650 m (2,130 ft)
- Highest elevation: 688 m (2,257 ft)
- Lowest elevation: 546 m (1,791 ft)
- Population (2023): 197
  - Density: 11.9/km^{2} (30.8/sq mi)
- Time zone: UTC+01:00 (CET)
  - Summer (DST): UTC+02:00 (CEST)
- INSEE/Postal code: 23066 /23700
- ^{1} French Land Register data, which excludes lakes, ponds, glaciers > 1 km^{2} (0.386 sq mi or 247 acres) and river estuaries.

Le Compas (Occitan: La Compàs) is a commune in the Creuse department in the Nouvelle-Aquitaine region in central France.

== Geography ==
A farming area comprising a small village and several hamlets, situated in the valley of the river Jarasse, some 15 miles (24 km) east of Aubusson, near the junction of the D25, D276 and the D996 roads and also on the D998.

== Population ==
Historical population
Year	Pop.	±% p.a.
1968	332	—
1975	270	−2.91%
1982	235	−1.96%
1990	216	−1.05%
1999	197	−1.02%
2007	225	+1.68%
2012	209	−1.46%
2017	212	+0.29%
2023	197	−1.22%
Source: INSEE

== Sights ==
- The twelfth-century church.
- A dolmen, the "Pierres Folles" near Marcillat-la-Farge.
- The château de Lavaud-Chaussade.
- The ruins of the château de Lavaud-Blanche.
- A modern chapel at Le Thiel.

== See also ==
- Communes of the Creuse department
