= Saint-Merd-la-Breuille =

Commune in Creuse, France

- Commune
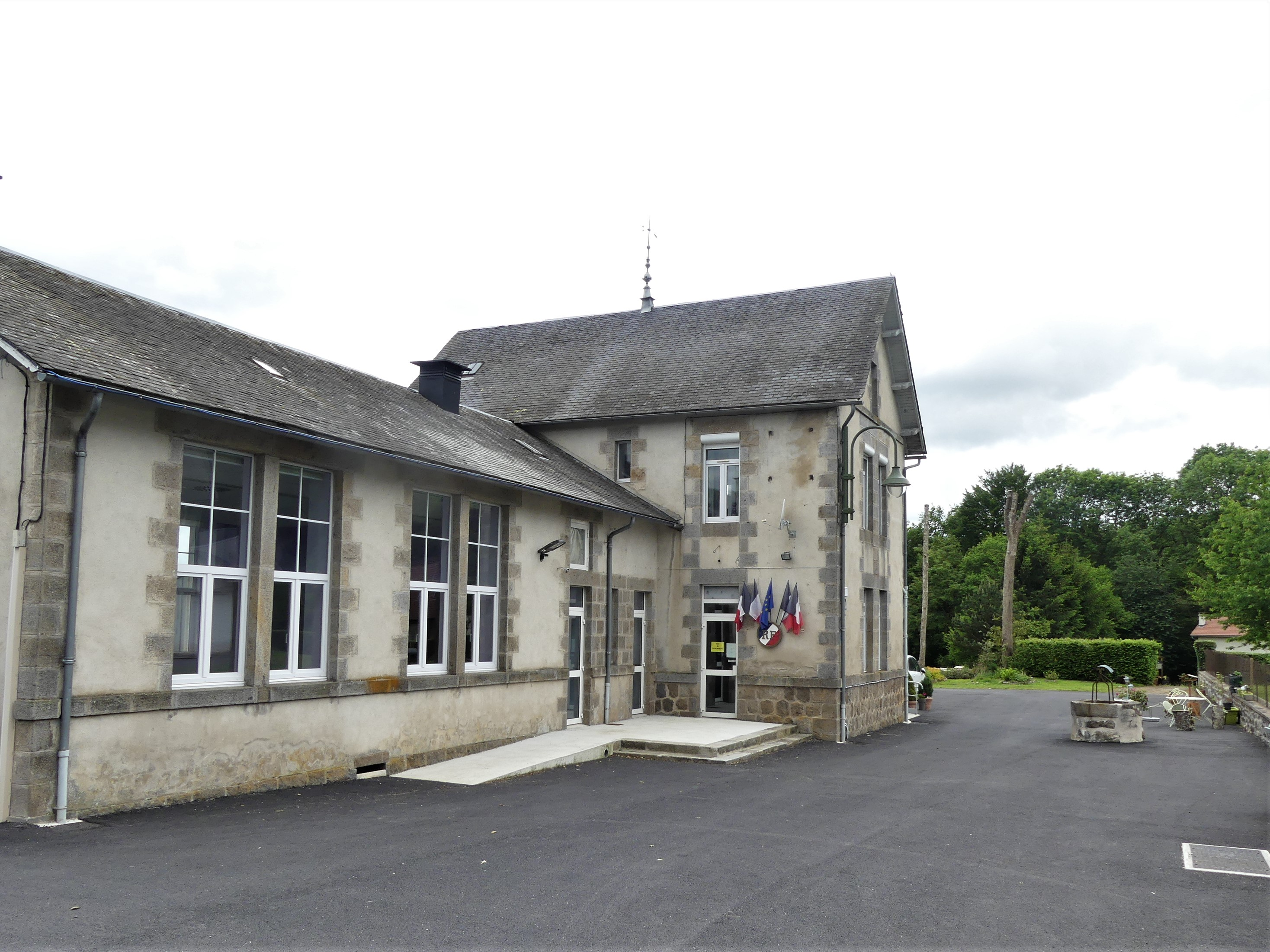
- Town hall

- Coat of arms
- Location of Saint-Merd-la-Breuille
- Location within France Location within Nouvelle-Aquitaine
- Coordinates: 45°44′38″N 2°25′53″E
- Country: France
- Region: Nouvelle-Aquitaine
- Department: Creuse
- Arrondissement: Aubusson
- Canton: Auzances
- Intercommunality: Haute-Corrèze Communauté

Government
  - Mayor (2020–2026): Guy Faugeron
- Area^{1}: 40.19 km^{2} (15.52 sq mi)
- Elevation: 780 m (2,560 ft)
- Highest elevation: 846 m (2,776 ft)
- Lowest elevation: 717 m (2,352 ft)
- Population (2023): 198
  - Density: 4.93/km^{2} (12.8/sq mi)
- Time zone: UTC+01:00 (CET)
  - Summer (DST): UTC+02:00 (CEST)
- INSEE/Postal code: 23221 /23100
- ^{1} French Land Register data, which excludes lakes, ponds, glaciers > 1 km^{2} (0.386 sq mi or 247 acres) and river estuaries.

Saint-Merd-la-Breuille (French pronunciation: [sɛ̃ mɛʁ la bʁœj]; Occitan: Sent Mèrd la Bruelha) is a commune in the Creuse department, in the Nouvelle-Aquitaine region, France.

== Geography ==
=== General information ===
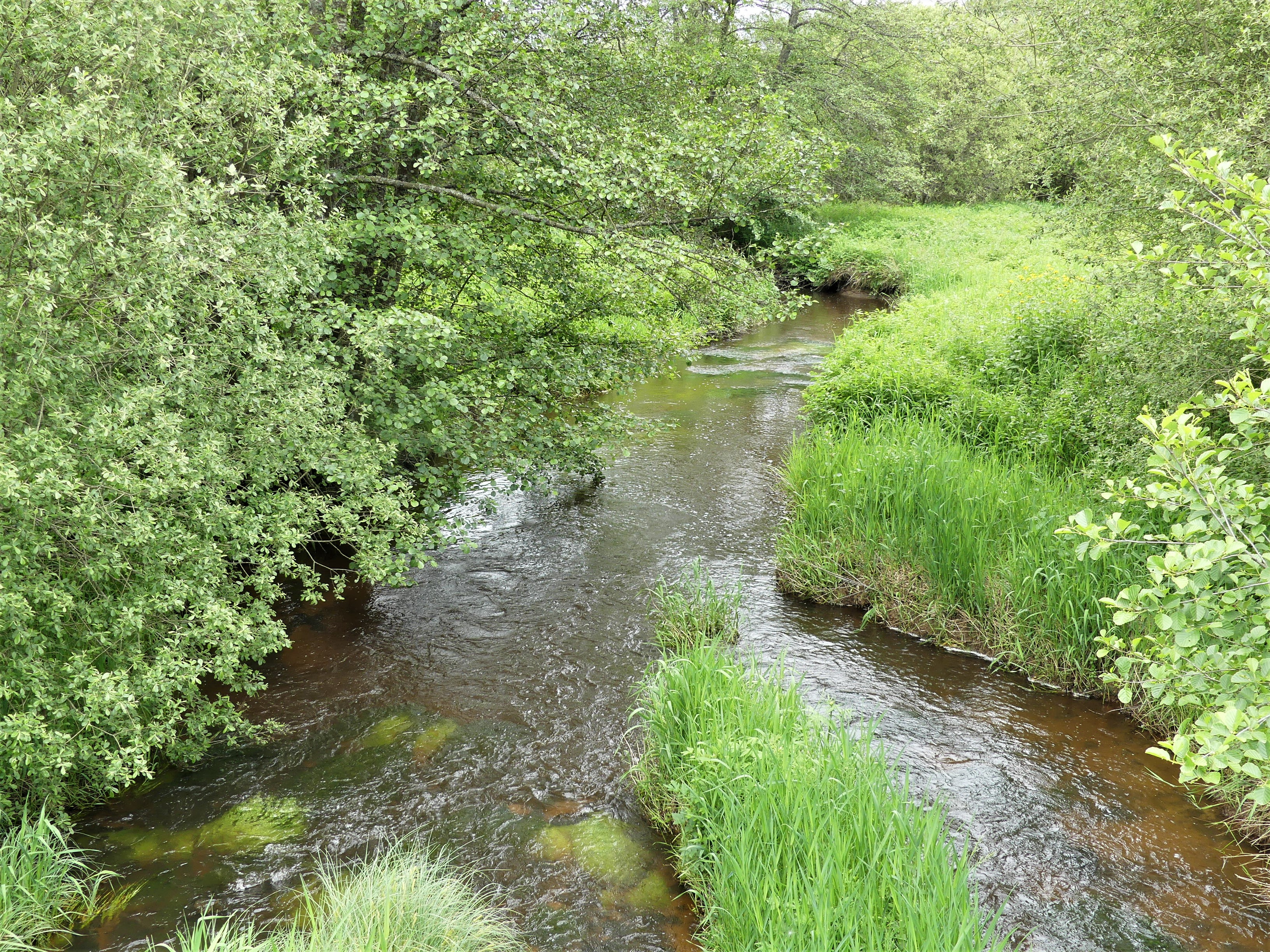
La Méouzette at the bridge near the place called Ganne Courtioux.

In the extreme south-east of the Creuse department, the municipality of Saint-Merd-la-Breuille extends over 40.19 km2. Bordering the departments of Corrèze and Puy-de-Dôme, its territory is crossed by the Méouzette and very briefly by the Ramade. It is bordered to the south by the Feyt stream for nearly five kilometres.

The minimum altitude of 717 metres is located at the extreme south-east, near the place called Les Allys, where the Méouzette leaves the commune and enters on the commune of Laroche-près-Feyt. The maximum altitude of 846 metres is located at the extreme southwest, on the edge of the commune of Eygurande, near the place called Travers.

Crossed by the departmental road 18, the village of Saint-Merd-la-Breuille is located, in orthodromic distances, 23 kilometres north-northeast of Ussel and 31 kilometres southeast of Aubusson.

The municipal territory is also served by the departmental roads 18A4 and 79.

=== Bordering municipalities ===
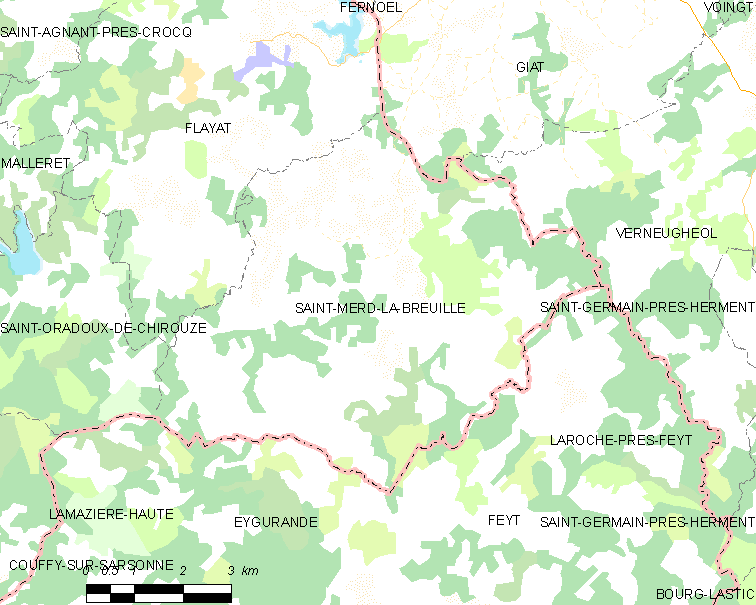
Map of Saint-Merd-la-Breuille and the surrounding municipalities.

Saint-Merd-la-Breuille borders seven other municipalities, three of which are in the department of Corrèze and two in the department of Puy-de-Dôme.

In the southwest, its territory is less than 500 metres far from the Corrèze municipality of Lamazière-Haute.

== Toponymy ==
Saint Merd is the deformation of Saint Medard de Noyon (Médardus).

== History ==
There has been a human occupation in the commune of Saint-Merd-la-Breuille since antiquity. At Manoux, a mound with a dolmen seems to indicate a Neolithic occupation.

In the Middle Ages, the Château de Hautefeuille was located on the current territory of the municipality. It is possible to find traces of its existence in 16th century documents. Indeed, this land was sold by Jean de Rochefort to Antoine de la Fayette in 1539. It then remained in the hands of the de La Fayette family, according to what is said by Guillaume-Michel Chabrol, in Volume IV of his book on the General and Local Customs of the Province of Auvergne (1784):

"The land of Hautefeuille, parish of Flayat, belonged to Louis de la Fayette. Jean Motier de la Fayette, killed in the day of Cognac in 1568, was lord of it, as well as of Nades. Claude de la Fayette, his son, lord of the same lands, married Marie d'Allègre, daughter of Gaspard, lord of Viverols and Beauvoir, on 22 November 1579. She passed to François de la Fayette, who married Magdeleine Pioche de la Vergne, famous in the Republic of Letters, in 1655. This branch of the Maison de la Fayette has been extinguished in the Maison de la Trimouille."

The castle was destroyed by Protestants during the Wars of Religion, in retaliation for the battle of Cognac in 1568, where its lord was killed. It was erected on the hill north of the villages of Gourseix and Vaudeix (at the point quoted at 766 metres above sea level on the IGN map) but on site, there is no record of its existence. However, in the surrounding villages, stones from its ruins have been reused for the construction of houses. A stone with a coat of arms was found on the wall of a house. This coat of arms has been taken over as the municipality's coat of arms.

== Politics and administration ==
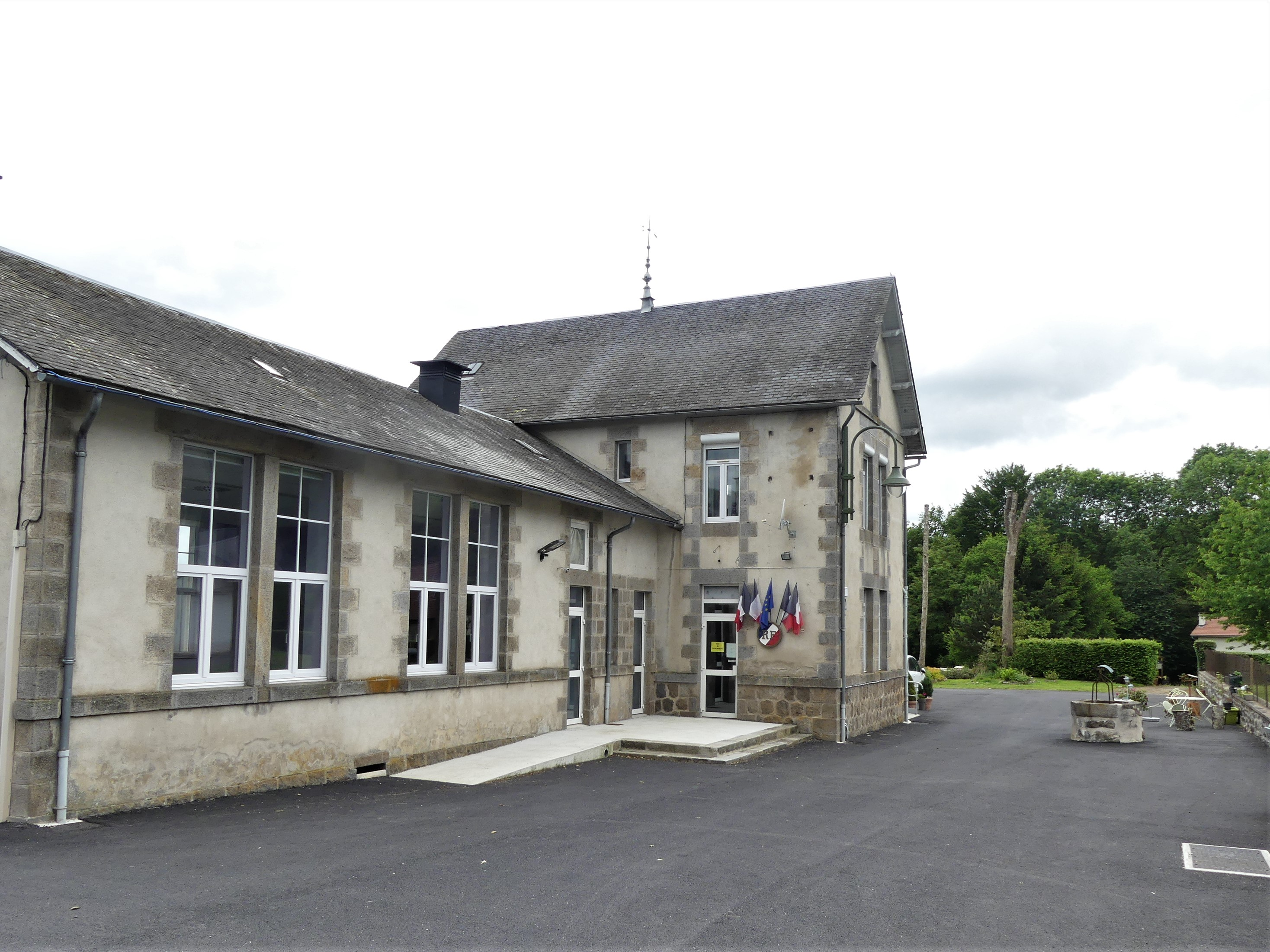
City hall of Saint-Merd-la-Breuille.

Guy Faugeron has been mayor of Saint-Merd-la-Breuille since March 2011.

== Demographics ==
Historical population
| Year | Pop. | ±% p.a. |
|---|---|---|
| 1968 | 416 | — |
| 1975 | 330 | −3.25% |
| 1982 | 271 | −2.77% |
| 1990 | 238 | −1.61% |
| 1999 | 238 | +0.00% |
| 2007 | 212 | −1.44% |
| 2012 | 195 | −1.66% |
| 2017 | 191 | −0.41% |
| 2023 | 198 | +0.60% |
Source: INSEE

== Local culture and heritage ==
=== Places and monuments ===
- Saint-Médard Church rebuilt in the 16th century and refurbished in the 18th and 19th centuries.
- Dupeyrix-Lavetizon Castle, in the village, at the west of the church.
- Besth Chapel.
- Fountain of devotion Saint-Jean-Baptiste, in Besth.
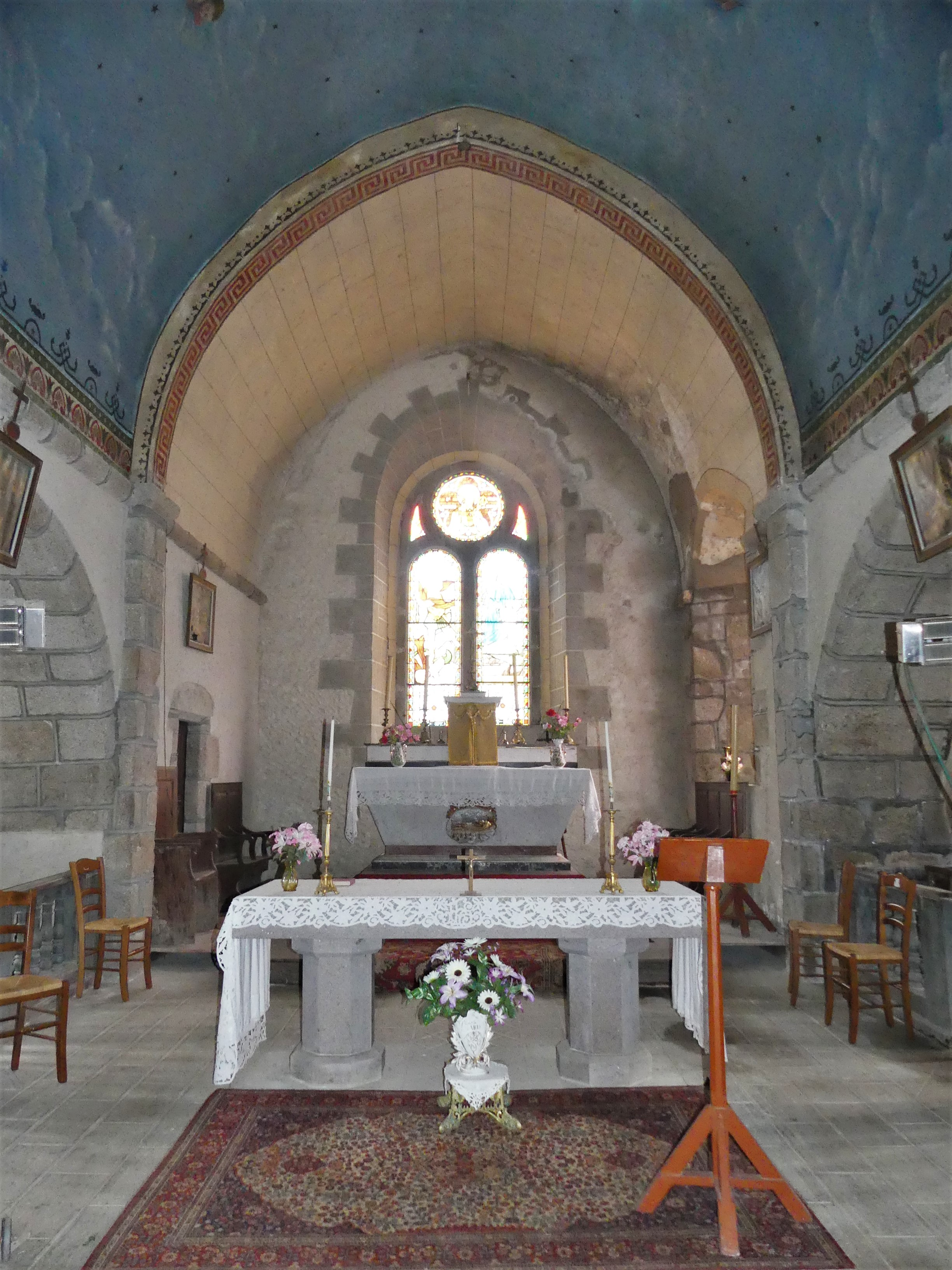
The Church choir.

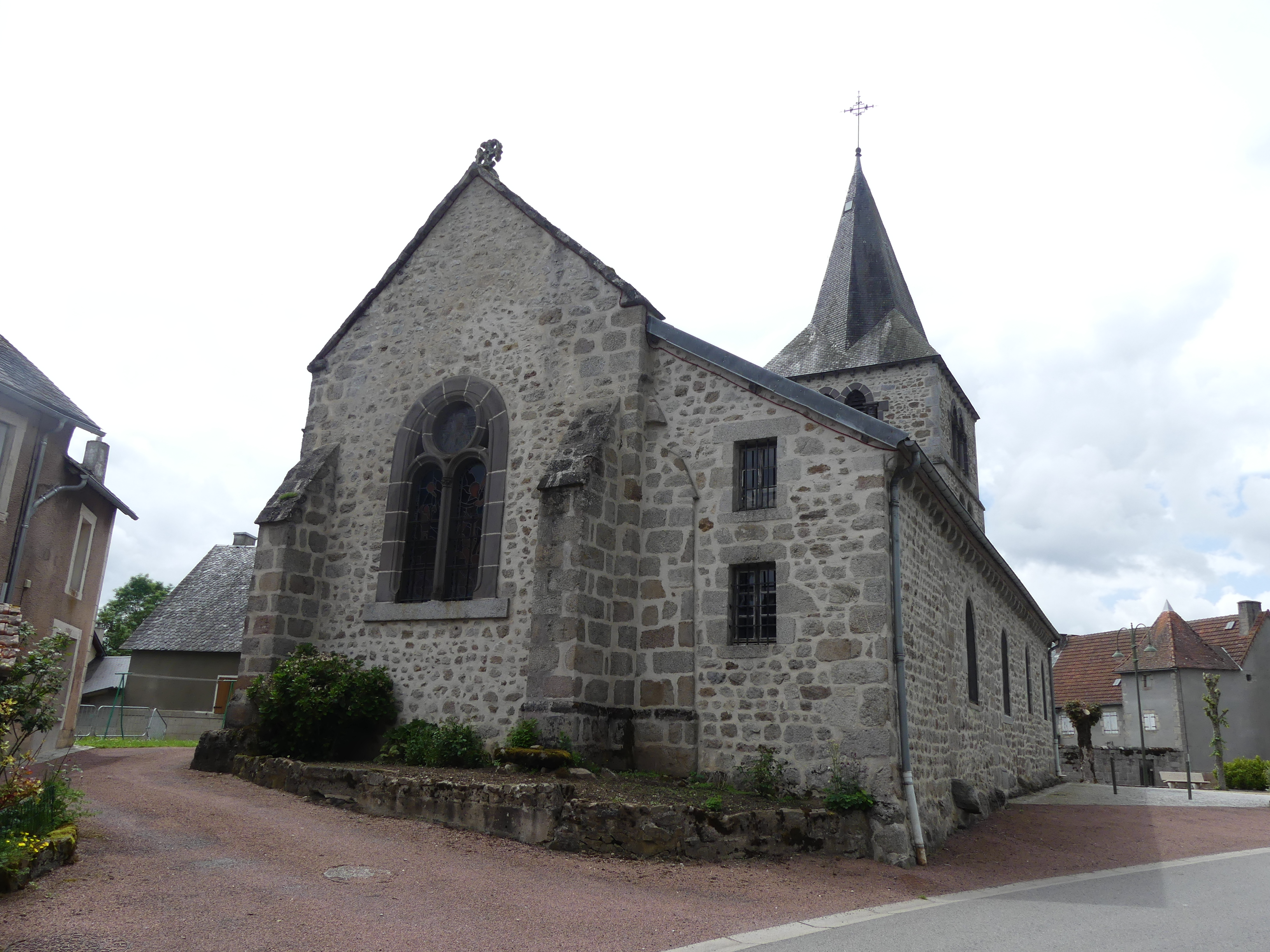
The Church chevet.

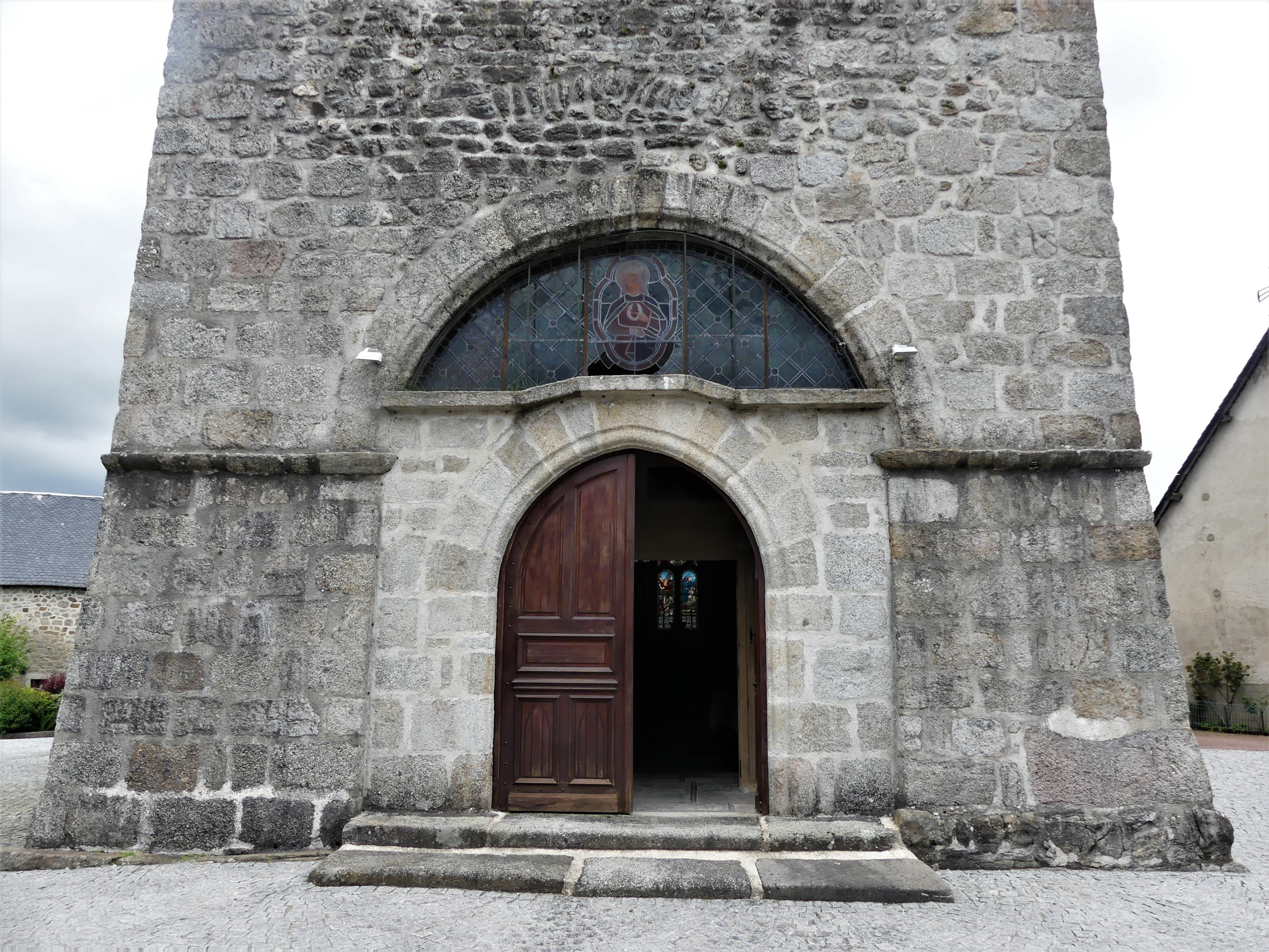
Its portal.

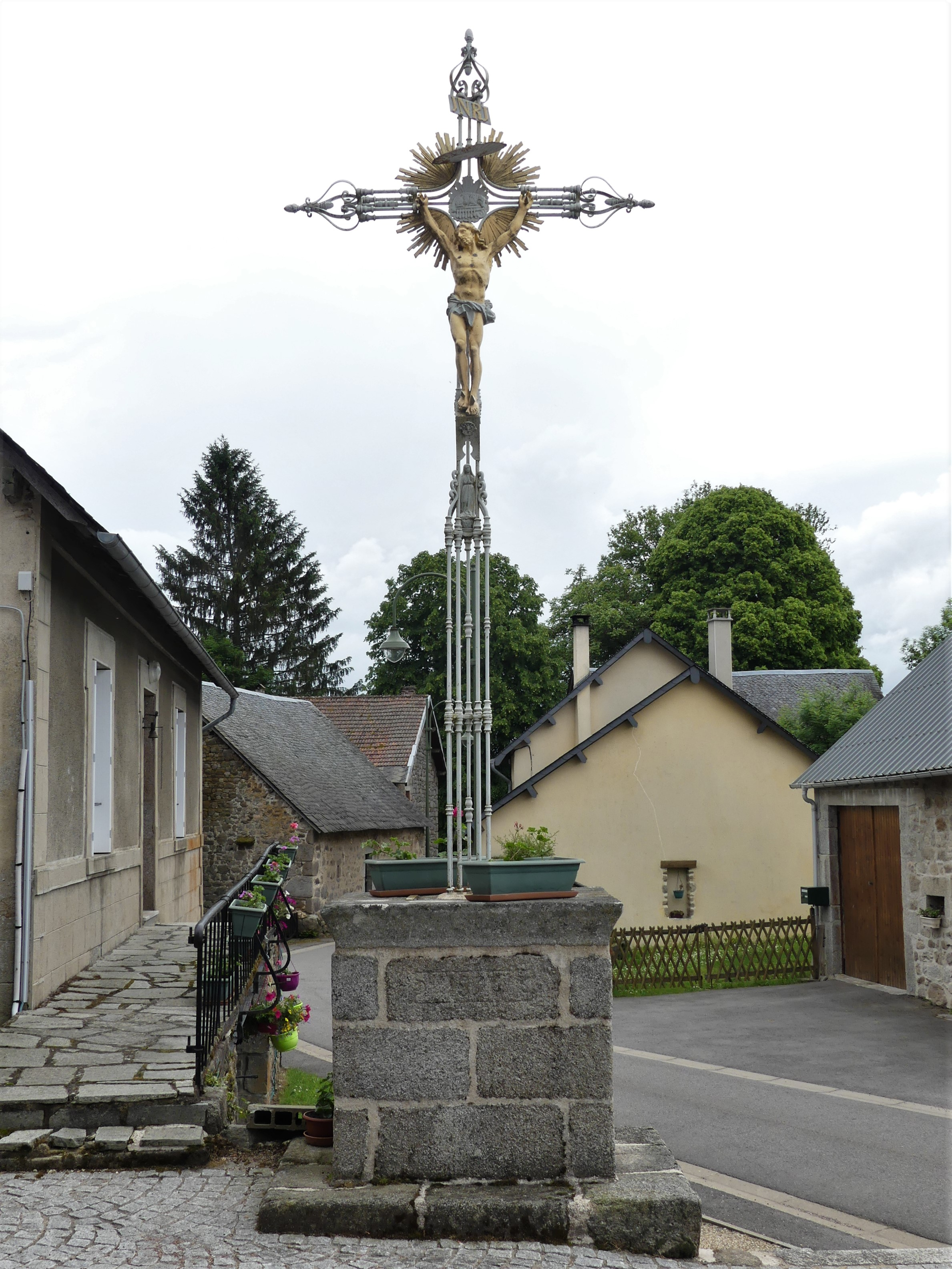
Calvary next to the church.

== See also ==
- Communes of the Creuse department
