= Saint-Pardoux-d'Arnet =

Commune in Nouvelle-Aquitaine, France

- Commune
- Location of Saint-Pardoux-d'Arnet
- Location within France Location within Nouvelle-Aquitaine
- Coordinates: 45°52′41″N 2°19′53″E
- Country: France
- Region: Nouvelle-Aquitaine
- Department: Creuse
- Arrondissement: Aubusson
- Canton: Auzances
- Intercommunality: CC Marche et Combraille en Aquitaine

Government
  - Mayor (2020–2026): Gerard Guyonnet
- Area^{1}: 16.44 km^{2} (6.35 sq mi)
- Elevation: 660 m (2,170 ft)
- Highest elevation: 743 m (2,438 ft)
- Lowest elevation: 596 m (1,955 ft)
- Population (2023): 163
  - Density: 9.91/km^{2} (25.7/sq mi)
- Time zone: UTC+01:00 (CET)
  - Summer (DST): UTC+02:00 (CEST)
- INSEE/Postal code: 23226 /23260
- ^{1} French Land Register data, which excludes lakes, ponds, glaciers > 1 km^{2} (0.386 sq mi or 247 acres) and river estuaries.

Saint-Pardoux-d'Arnet (French pronunciation: [sɛ̃ paʁdu daʁnɛ]; Occitan: Sent Pardós d'Arnèt) is a commune in the Creuse department in central France.

== Geography ==
The river Tardes forms most of the commune's northeastern border.

== Population ==
Historical population
Year	Pop.	±% p.a.
1968	245	—
1975	217	−1.72%
1982	181	−2.56%
1990	186	+0.34%
1999	150	−2.36%
2007	158	+0.65%
2012	165	+0.87%
2017	173	+0.95%
2023	163	−0.99%
Source: INSEE

== See also ==
- Communes of the Creuse department
