= Le Mas-d'Artige =

Commune in Nouvelle-Aquitaine, France

Le Mas-d’Artige
- Commune
- Location of Le Mas-d’Artige
- Location within France Location within Nouvelle-Aquitaine
- Coordinates: 45°44′06″N 2°12′11″E
- Country: France
- Region: Nouvelle-Aquitaine
- Department: Creuse
- Arrondissement: Aubusson
- Canton: Auzances
- Intercommunality: Haute-Corrèze Communauté

Government
  - Mayor (2020–2026): Gilles Magrit
- Area^{1}: 16.21 km^{2} (6.26 sq mi)
- Highest elevation: 921 m (3,022 ft)
- Lowest elevation: 686 m (2,251 ft)
- Population (2023): 92
  - Density: 5.7/km^{2} (15/sq mi)
- Time zone: UTC+01:00 (CET)
  - Summer (DST): UTC+02:00 (CEST)
- INSEE/Postal code: 23125 /23100
- ^{1} French Land Register data, which excludes lakes, ponds, glaciers > 1 km^{2} (0.386 sq mi or 247 acres) and river estuaries.

Le Mas-d’Artige (French pronunciation: [lə ma(s) daʁtiʒ]; Occitan: Lo Mas de L'Artija) is a commune in the Creuse department in the Nouvelle-Aquitaine region in central France.

== Geography ==
An area of lakes, forestry and farming comprising a small village and several hamlets, situated some 15 miles (24 km) south of Aubusson, at the junction of the D8, D28 and the D982 roads. The commune is home to the source waters of the river Creuse, in the natural park of the Millevaches (1000 lakes, not cows).

== Population ==
Historical population
| Year | Pop. | ±% p.a. |
|---|---|---|
| 1968 | 145 | — |
| 1975 | 110 | −3.87% |
| 1982 | 92 | −2.52% |
| 1990 | 84 | −1.13% |
| 1999 | 110 | +3.04% |
| 2007 | 103 | −0.82% |
| 2012 | 109 | +1.14% |
| 2017 | 99 | −1.91% |
| 2023 | 92 | −1.21% |
Source: INSEE

== Sights ==
- The nineteenth-century church.
- Ancient houses at la Vialle.
- A ruined church at Villefert.
- A sixteenth-century cross in the cemetery.
- A twelfth-century Templars cross.

== See also ==
- Communes of the Creuse department
