= Saint-Martial-le-Vieux =

Commune in Nouvelle-Aquitaine, France

- Commune
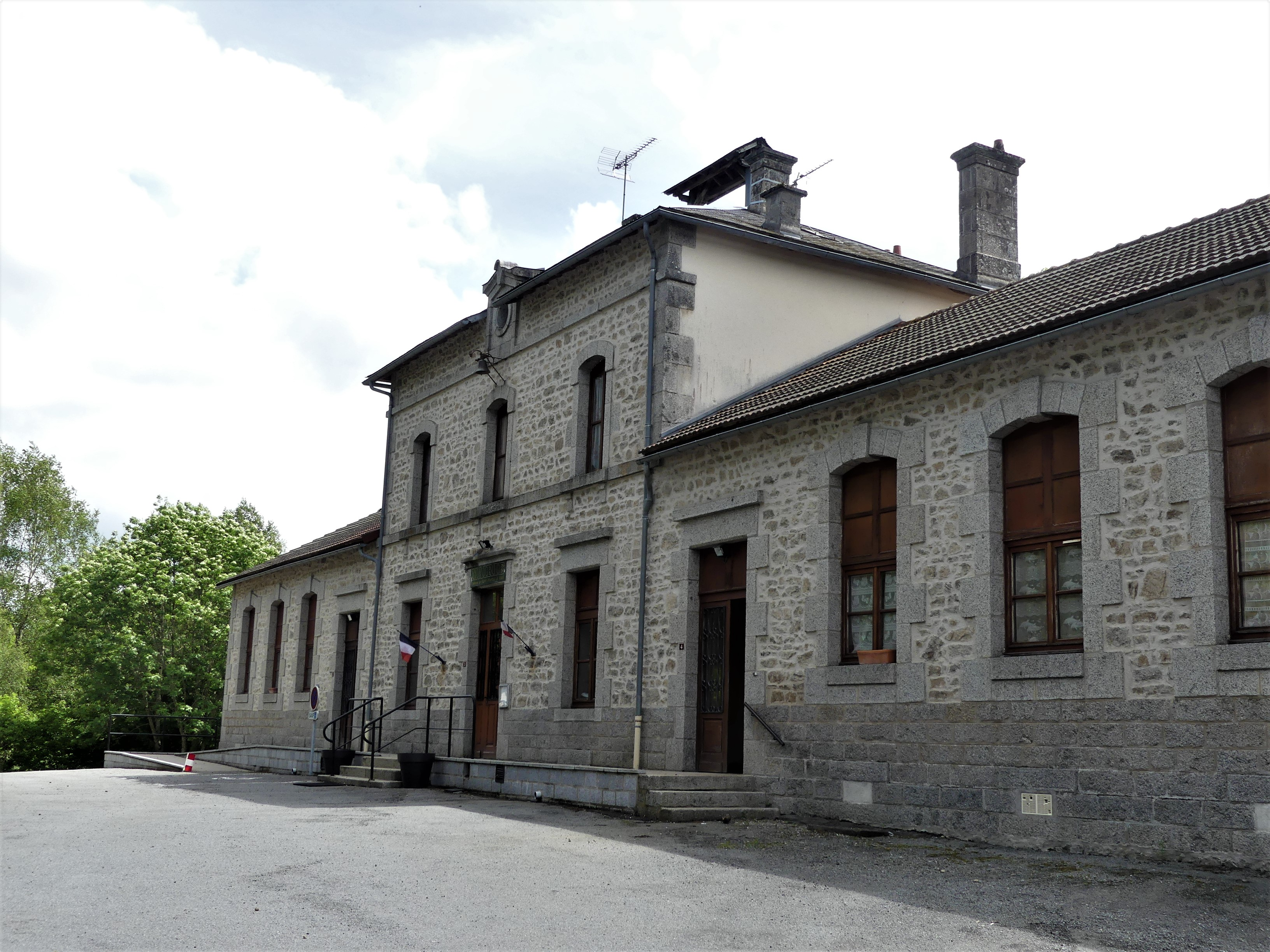
- Saint-Martial-le-Vieux Town hall

- Coat of arms
- Location of Saint-Martial-le-Vieux
- Location within France Location within Nouvelle-Aquitaine
- Coordinates: 45°41′21″N 2°18′45″E
- Country: France
- Region: Nouvelle-Aquitaine
- Department: Creuse
- Arrondissement: Aubusson
- Canton: Auzances
- Intercommunality: Haute-Corrèze Communauté

Government
  - Mayor (2020–2026): Alain Sivade
- Area^{1}: 22.22 km^{2} (8.58 sq mi)
- Elevation: 760 m (2,490 ft)
- Highest elevation: 935 m (3,068 ft)
- Lowest elevation: 723 m (2,372 ft)
- Population (2023): 150
  - Density: 6.8/km^{2} (17/sq mi)
- Time zone: UTC+01:00 (CET)
  - Summer (DST): UTC+02:00 (CEST)
- INSEE/Postal code: 23215 /23100
- ^{1} French Land Register data, which excludes lakes, ponds, glaciers > 1 km^{2} (0.386 sq mi or 247 acres) and river estuaries.

Saint-Martial-le-Vieux (French pronunciation: [sɛ̃ maʁsjal lə vjø]; Occitan: Sent Marçau lo Vielh) is a commune in the Creuse department in central France.

== Population ==
Historical population
Year	Pop.	±% p.a.
1968	137	—
1975	116	−2.35%
1982	95	−2.81%
1990	103	+1.02%
1999	109	+0.63%
2007	124	+1.62%
2012	130	+0.95%
2017	136	+0.91%
2023	150	+1.65%
Source: INSEE

== See also ==
- Communes of the Creuse department
