= Magnat-l'Étrange =

Commune in Nouvelle-Aquitaine, France

Magnat-l’Etrange
- Commune
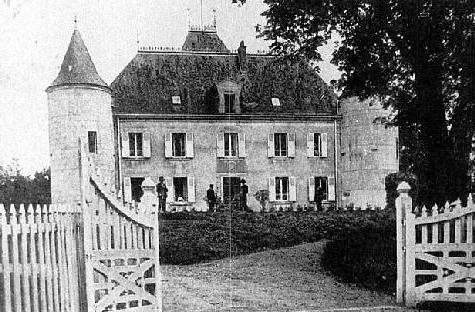
- The Château du Bost, in Magnat-l'Etrange
- Location of Magnat-l’Etrange
- Location within France Location within Nouvelle-Aquitaine
- Coordinates: 45°47′41″N 2°16′45″E
- Country: France
- Region: Nouvelle-Aquitaine
- Department: Creuse
- Arrondissement: Aubusson
- Canton: Auzances
- Intercommunality: Haute-Corrèze Communauté

Government
  - Mayor (2022–2026): Jérémy Brugere
- Area^{1}: 25.87 km^{2} (9.99 sq mi)
- Highest elevation: 868 m (2,848 ft)
- Lowest elevation: 636 m (2,087 ft)
- Population (2023): 236
  - Density: 9.12/km^{2} (23.6/sq mi)
- Time zone: UTC+01:00 (CET)
  - Summer (DST): UTC+02:00 (CEST)
- INSEE/Postal code: 23115 /23260
- ^{1} French Land Register data, which excludes lakes, ponds, glaciers > 1 km^{2} (0.386 sq mi or 247 acres) and river estuaries.

Magnat-l’Etrange (French pronunciation: [maɲa letʁɑ̃ʒ]; Occitan: Manhac l'Estranh) is a commune in the Creuse department in the Nouvelle-Aquitaine region in central France.

== Geography ==
An area of farming and forestry, lakes and streams, comprising the village and several hamlets situated some 14 miles (23 km) southeast of Aubusson, at the junction of the D25, D28, D31 and the D32 roads. The commune is within the natural park of the Millevaches (1000 lakes, not cows).

== Population ==
Historical population
Year	Pop.	±% p.a.
1968	462	—
1975	384	−2.61%
1982	318	−2.66%
1990	245	−3.21%
1999	212	−1.59%
2007	231	+1.08%
2012	222	−0.79%
2017	242	+1.74%
2023	236	−0.42%
Source: INSEE

== Sights ==
- The church, dating from the eleventh century.
- The fifteenth-century château.
- The Château Dubost, dating from the sixteenth century.

== See also ==
- Communes of the Creuse department
