= Mérinchal =

Commune in Nouvelle-Aquitaine, France

- Commune
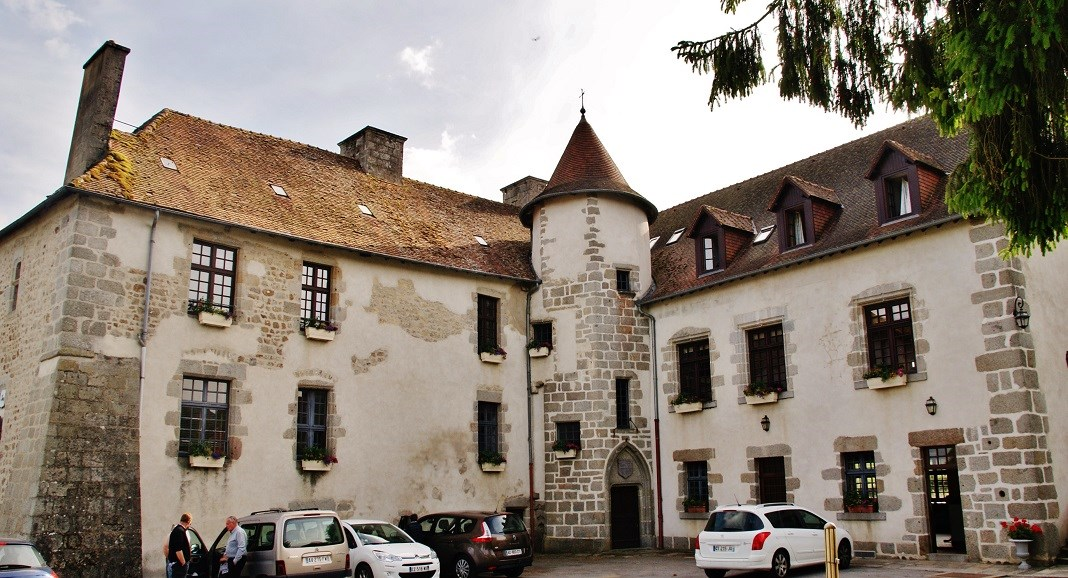
- Town hall of Mérinchal

- Coat of arms
- Location of Mérinchal
- Location within France Location within Nouvelle-Aquitaine
- Coordinates: 45°55′03″N 2°29′21″E
- Country: France
- Region: Nouvelle-Aquitaine
- Department: Creuse
- Arrondissement: Aubusson
- Canton: Auzances
- Intercommunality: CC Marche et Combraille en Aquitaine

Government
  - Mayor (2020–2026): Marie-Françoise Ventenat
- Area^{1}: 45.45 km^{2} (17.55 sq mi)
- Elevation: 735 m (2,411 ft)
- Highest elevation: 784 m (2,572 ft)
- Lowest elevation: 656 m (2,152 ft)
- Population (2023): 654
  - Density: 14.4/km^{2} (37.3/sq mi)
- Time zone: UTC+01:00 (CET)
  - Summer (DST): UTC+02:00 (CEST)
- INSEE/Postal code: 23131 /23420
- ^{1} French Land Register data, which excludes lakes, ponds, glaciers > 1 km^{2} (0.386 sq mi or 247 acres) and river estuaries.

Mérinchal (French pronunciation: [meʁɛ̃ʃal]; Occitan: Mairinchal) is a commune in the Creuse department in the Nouvelle-Aquitaine region in central France.

== Geography ==
A large area of farming, forestry, lakes and streams comprising several villages and hamlets situated some 15 miles (24 km) east of Aubusson, at the junction of the D27, D28 and the D31 roads and also on the D941. The commune has the department of Puy-de-Dôme on its eastern border and is also the source of the river Cher. Until 2008 the commune was served by two railway stations on the now closed line from Montluçon to Eygurande–Merlines.

== Population ==
Historical population
Year	Pop.	±% p.a.
1968	1,187	—
1975	1,159	−0.34%
1982	1,032	−1.64%
1990	907	−1.60%
1999	821	−1.10%
2007	754	−1.06%
2012	737	−0.46%
2017	720	−0.47%
2023	654	−1.59%
Source: INSEE

== Sights ==
- The church, dating from the twelfth century.
- The remains of a twelfth-century castle at La Mothe.
- The remains of a chateau at Villebrune.
- The seventeenth-century chateau du Vieux-Voisin.
- Chapels at Villelume, La Mothe and La Vernède

== International relations ==
Mérinchal is twinned with Öhningen, Germany since 1984.

== See also ==
- Communes of the Creuse department
