= La Mazière-aux-Bons-Hommes =

Commune in Nouvelle-Aquitaine, France

- Commune
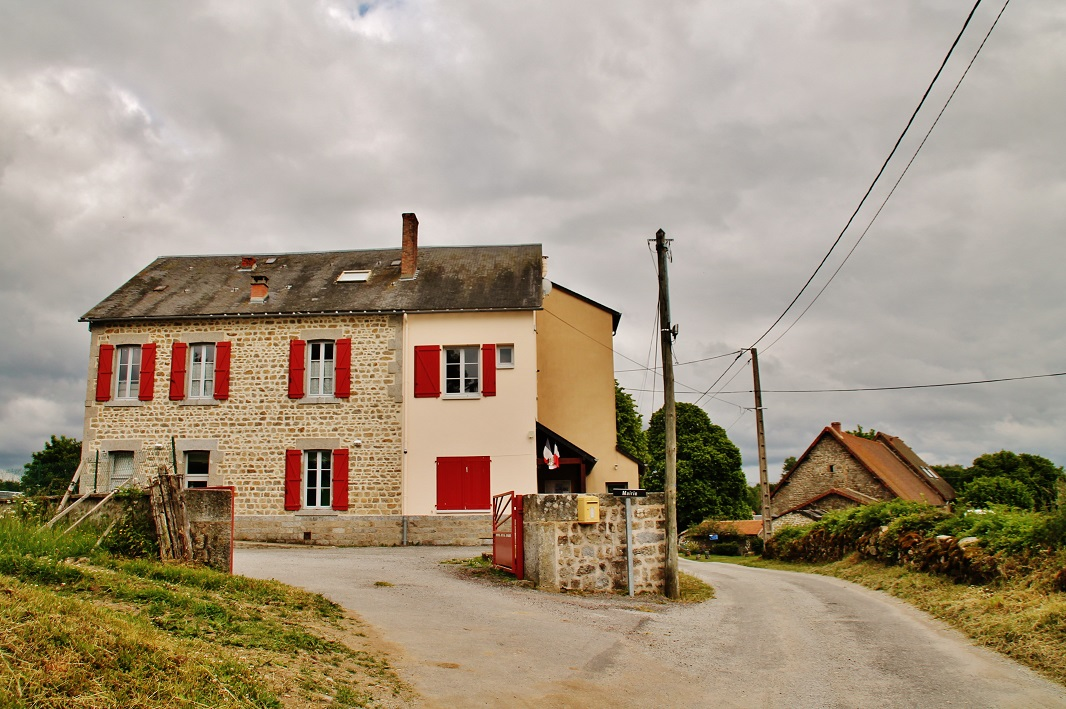
- La Mazière-aux-Bons-Hommes Town hall

- Coat of arms
- Location of La Mazière-aux-Bons-Hommes
- Location within France Location within Nouvelle-Aquitaine
- Coordinates: 45°53′05″N 2°26′29″E
- Country: France
- Region: Nouvelle-Aquitaine
- Department: Creuse
- Arrondissement: Aubusson
- Canton: Auzances
- Intercommunality: CC Marche et Combraille en Aquitaine

Government
  - Mayor (2020–2026): Frédéric Perrier
- Area^{1}: 10.24 km^{2} (3.95 sq mi)
- Highest elevation: 802 m (2,631 ft)
- Lowest elevation: 692 m (2,270 ft)
- Population (2023): 52
  - Density: 5.1/km^{2} (13/sq mi)
- Time zone: UTC+01:00 (CET)
  - Summer (DST): UTC+02:00 (CEST)
- INSEE/Postal code: 23129 /23260
- ^{1} French Land Register data, which excludes lakes, ponds, glaciers > 1 km^{2} (0.386 sq mi or 247 acres) and river estuaries.

La Mazière-aux-Bons-Hommes (French pronunciation: [la mazjɛʁ o bɔ̃.z‿ɔm]; Occitan: La Masèira lo Bon Òmes) is a commune in the Creuse department in the Nouvelle-Aquitaine region in central France.

== Geography ==
An area of lakes, forestry and farming comprising a small village and a couple of hamlets situated some 15 miles (24 km) southeast of Aubusson, at the junction of the D10, D28 and the D941. The commune is bordered to the east by the department of Allier.

== Population ==
Historical population
Year	Pop.	±% p.a.
1968	110	—
1975	96	−1.93%
1982	99	+0.44%
1990	96	−0.38%
1999	73	−3.00%
2007	61	−2.22%
2012	70	+2.79%
2017	65	−1.47%
2023	52	−3.65%
Source: INSEE

== Sights ==
- The nineteenth-century church.

== See also ==
- Communes of the Creuse department
