= Saint-Georges-Nigremont =

Commune in Nouvelle-Aquitaine, France

- Commune
- Coat of arms
- Location of Saint-Georges-Nigremont
- Location within France Location within Nouvelle-Aquitaine
- Coordinates: 45°50′14″N 2°15′49″E
- Country: France
- Region: Nouvelle-Aquitaine
- Department: Creuse
- Arrondissement: Aubusson
- Canton: Auzances
- Intercommunality: CC Marche et Combraille en Aquitaine

Government
  - Mayor (2020–2026): René Roulland
- Area^{1}: 18.59 km^{2} (7.18 sq mi)
- Elevation: 746 m (2,448 ft)
- Highest elevation: 801 m (2,628 ft)
- Lowest elevation: 589 m (1,932 ft)
- Population (2023): 134
  - Density: 7.21/km^{2} (18.7/sq mi)
- Time zone: UTC+01:00 (CET)
  - Summer (DST): UTC+02:00 (CEST)
- INSEE/Postal code: 23198 /23500
- ^{1} French Land Register data, which excludes lakes, ponds, glaciers > 1 km^{2} (0.386 sq mi or 247 acres) and river estuaries.

Saint-Georges-Nigremont (French pronunciation: [sɛ̃ ʒɔʁʒ niɡʁəmɔ̃]; Occitan: Sent Jòrgi e Negremont) is a commune in the Creuse department in central France.

== Population ==
Historical population
Year	Pop.	±% p.a.
1968	246	—
1975	200	−2.91%
1982	183	−1.26%
1990	156	−1.98%
1999	168	+0.83%
2007	159	−0.69%
2012	156	−0.38%
2017	129	−3.73%
2023	134	+0.64%
Source: INSEE

== See also ==
- Communes of the Creuse department
