= La Courtine =

Commune in Nouvelle-Aquitaine, France

- Commune
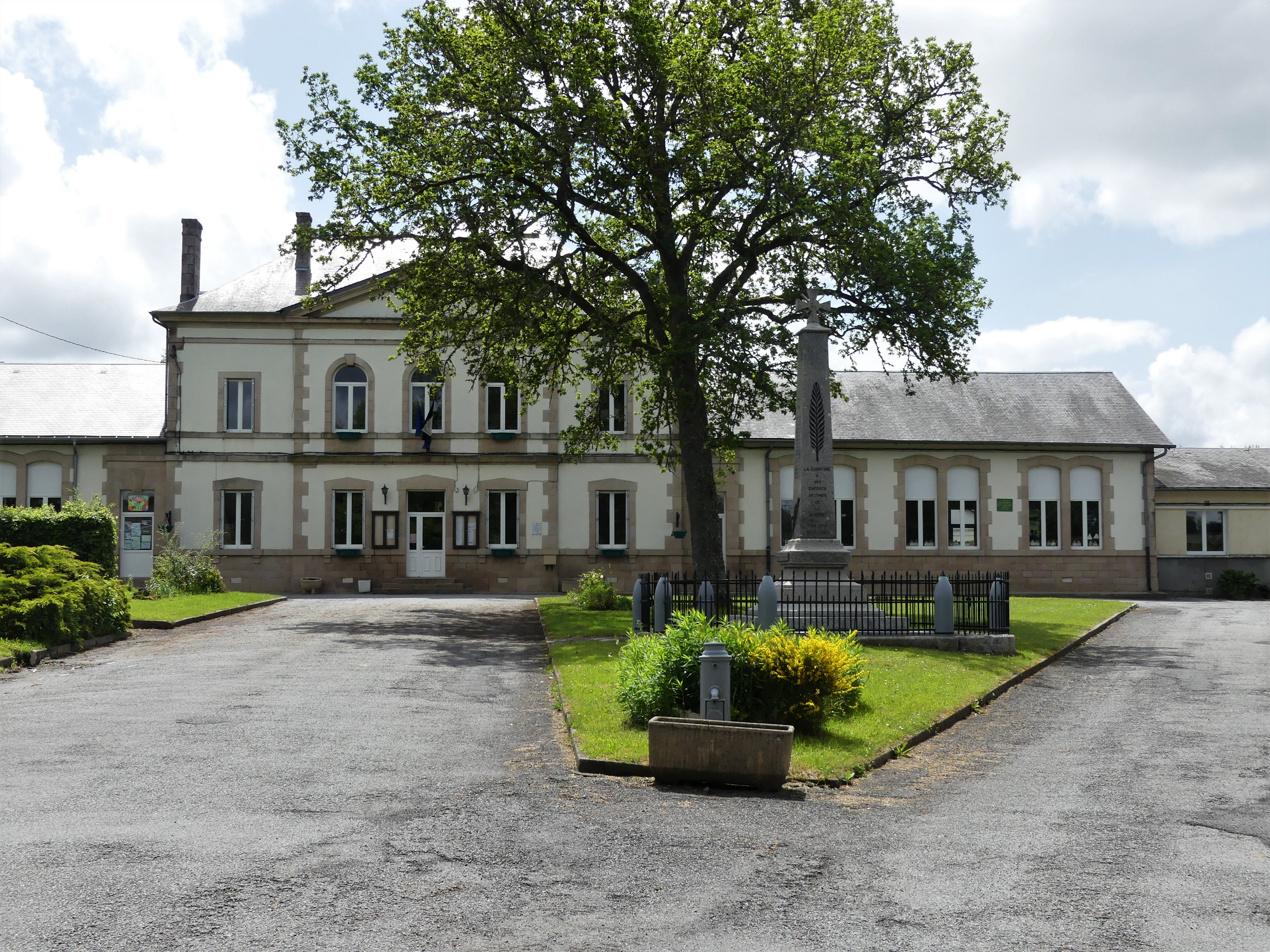

- Coat of arms
- Location of La Courtine
- Location within France Location within Nouvelle-Aquitaine
- Coordinates: 45°42′06″N 2°15′51″E
- Country: France
- Region: Nouvelle-Aquitaine
- Department: Creuse
- Arrondissement: Aubusson
- Canton: Auzances
- Intercommunality: Haute-Corrèze Communauté

Government
  - Mayor (2020–2026): Jean-Marc Michelon
- Area^{1}: 41.42 km^{2} (15.99 sq mi)
- Highest elevation: 895 m (2,936 ft)
- Lowest elevation: 714 m (2,343 ft)
- Population (2023): 707
  - Density: 17.1/km^{2} (44.2/sq mi)
- Time zone: UTC+01:00 (CET)
  - Summer (DST): UTC+02:00 (CEST)
- INSEE/Postal code: 23067 /23100
- Website: lacourtine.fr
- ^{1} French Land Register data, which excludes lakes, ponds, glaciers > 1 km^{2} (0.386 sq mi or 247 acres) and river estuaries.

La Courtine (French pronunciation: [la kuʁtin]; Auvergnat: La Cortina) is a commune in the Creuse department in the Nouvelle-Aquitaine region in central France.

== Geography ==
An area of lakes, forestry and farming comprising the village and several hamlets situated in the Creuse river valley, some 18 miles (29 km) south of Aubusson, at the junction of the D25, D29 and the D992. The commune is within the natural park of Millevaches, (1000 lakes, not cows).

== History ==
=== La Courtine military camp ===
The foundation of the camp in 1904 transformed the town: the inhabitants remained peasants during the day but became bar-keepers at night and soon there were more bars than inhabitants.

== Population ==
Historical population
Year	Pop.	±% p.a.
1968	1,233	—
1975	1,164	−0.82%
1982	986	−2.34%
1990	1,057	+0.87%
1999	971	−0.94%
2007	890	−1.08%
2012	715	−4.28%
2017	769	+1.47%
2023	707	−1.39%
Source: INSEE

== Sights ==
- The thirteenth-century church.
- A watermill in the village of Lair.
- Eleventh-century defensive mottes at Cinq Mottes.
- A military camp, established in 1904, housing up to 4000 soldiers, site of the 1917 mutiny by troops of the Russian Expeditionary Force in France.
- The thirteenth-century churches at the hamlets of Saint-Denis and at Trucq.

== See also ==
- Communes of the Creuse department
- Regional nature parks of France
