= Beissat =

Commune in Nouvelle-Aquitaine, France

- Commune
- Location of Beissat
- Location within France Location within Nouvelle-Aquitaine
- Coordinates: 45°46′26″N 2°16′37″E
- Country: France
- Region: Nouvelle-Aquitaine
- Department: Creuse
- Arrondissement: Aubusson
- Canton: Auzances
- Intercommunality: Haute-Corrèze Communauté

Government
  - Mayor (2020–2026): Pierrick Louradour
- Area^{1}: 14.49 km^{2} (5.59 sq mi)
- Elevation: 700 m (2,300 ft)
- Highest elevation: 886 m (2,907 ft)
- Lowest elevation: 690 m (2,260 ft)
- Population (2023): 31
  - Density: 2.1/km^{2} (5.5/sq mi)
- Time zone: UTC+01:00 (CET)
  - Summer (DST): UTC+02:00 (CEST)
- INSEE/Postal code: 23019 /23260
- ^{1} French Land Register data, which excludes lakes, ponds, glaciers > 1 km^{2} (0.386 sq mi or 247 acres) and river estuaries.

Beissat (French pronunciation: [bɛsa]; Occitan: Bèiçac) is a commune in the Creuse department in the Nouvelle-Aquitaine region in central France.

== Geography ==
An area of forestry, farming and lakes comprising a small village and two hamlets situated some 14 miles (23 km) south of Aubusson on the D18 and the D25 roads. A small river, the Rozeille, flows through the commune.

== Population ==
Historical population
Year	Pop.	±% p.a.
1968	94	—
1975	75	−3.17%
1982	62	−2.68%
1990	41	−5.04%
1999	31	−3.06%
2007	32	+0.40%
2012	33	+0.62%
2017	25	−5.40%
2023	31	+3.65%
Source: INSEE

== Sights ==
- The church, dating from the thirteenth century.

== See also ==
- Communes of the Creuse department
