= La Villeneuve, Creuse =

Commune in Nouvelle-Aquitaine, France

La Villeneuve
- Commune
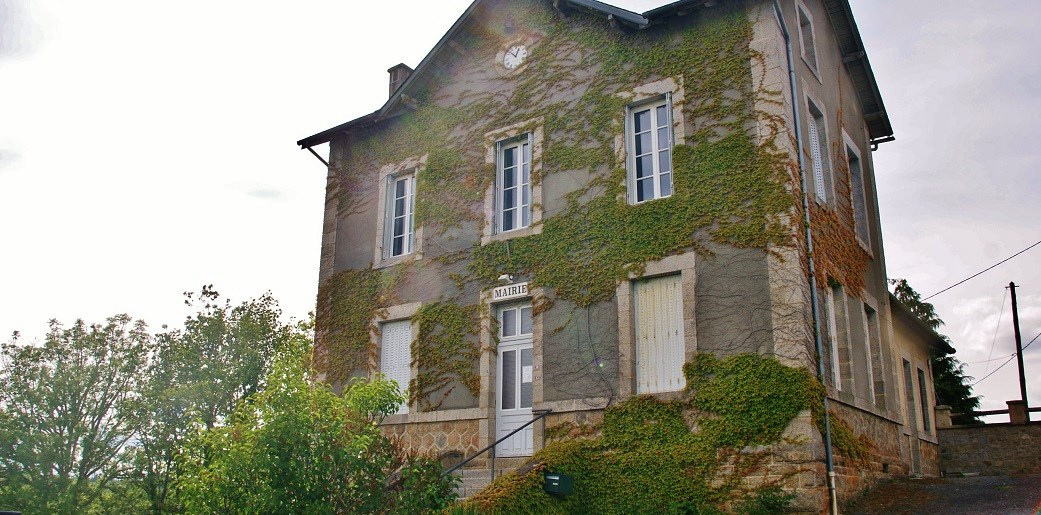
- Town hall
- Location of La Villeneuve
- Location within France Location within Nouvelle-Aquitaine
- Coordinates: 45°53′58″N 2°24′37″E
- Country: France
- Region: Nouvelle-Aquitaine
- Department: Creuse
- Arrondissement: Aubusson
- Canton: Auzances
- Intercommunality: CC Marche et Combraille en Aquitaine

Government
  - Mayor (2020–2026): Thierry Boudineau
- Area^{1}: 4.45 km^{2} (1.72 sq mi)
- Elevation: 705 m (2,313 ft)
- Highest elevation: 790 m (2,590 ft)
- Lowest elevation: 648 m (2,126 ft)
- Population (2023): 44
  - Density: 9.9/km^{2} (26/sq mi)
- Time zone: UTC+01:00 (CET)
  - Summer (DST): UTC+02:00 (CEST)
- INSEE/Postal code: 23265 /23260
- ^{1} French Land Register data, which excludes lakes, ponds, glaciers > 1 km^{2} (0.386 sq mi or 247 acres) and river estuaries.

La Villeneuve (French pronunciation: [la vilnœv]; Occitan: La Vila Nueva) is a commune in the Creuse department in the Nouvelle-Aquitaine region in central France.

== Geography ==
A very small farming and forestry village situated some 12 miles (19 km) east of Aubusson, at the junction of the D28 with the D941 road.

== Population ==
Historical population
Year	Pop.	±% p.a.
1968	125	—
1975	123	−0.23%
1982	117	−0.71%
1990	94	−2.70%
1999	90	−0.48%
2007	72	−2.75%
2012	86	+3.62%
2017	64	−5.74%
2023	44	−6.05%
Source: INSEE

== Sights ==
- The nineteenth-century church of St.Radegonde and a chapel.
- The Château du Rocher and its park.

== See also ==
- Communes of the Creuse department
