= Pontcharraud =

Commune in Nouvelle-Aquitaine, France

- Commune
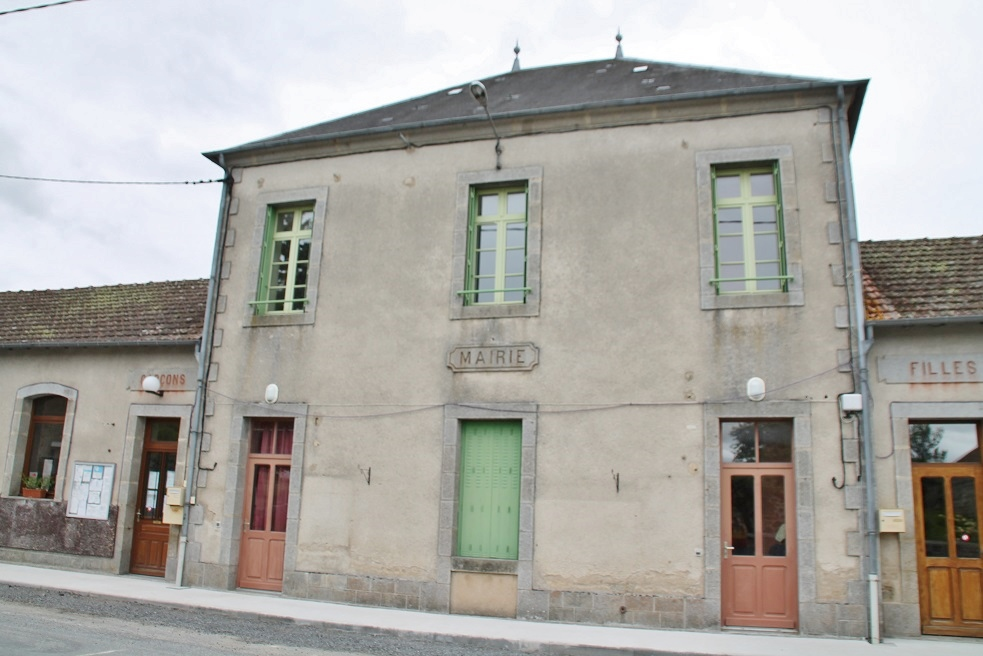
- Town hall of Pontcharraud
- Location of Pontcharraud
- Location within France Location within Nouvelle-Aquitaine
- Coordinates: 45°51′54″N 2°16′19″E
- Country: France
- Region: Nouvelle-Aquitaine
- Department: Creuse
- Arrondissement: Aubusson
- Canton: Auzances
- Intercommunality: CC Marche et Combraille en Aquitaine

Government
  - Mayor (2020–2026): Éric d'Hulster
- Area^{1}: 9.56 km^{2} (3.69 sq mi)
- Elevation: 580 m (1,900 ft)
- Highest elevation: 700 m (2,300 ft)
- Lowest elevation: 571 m (1,873 ft)
- Population (2023): 82
  - Density: 8.6/km^{2} (22/sq mi)
- Time zone: UTC+01:00 (CET)
  - Summer (DST): UTC+02:00 (CEST)
- INSEE/Postal code: 23156 /23260
- ^{1} French Land Register data, which excludes lakes, ponds, glaciers > 1 km^{2} (0.386 sq mi or 247 acres) and river estuaries.

Pontcharraud (French pronunciation: [pɔ̃ʃaʁo]; Occitan: Pontcharreu) is a commune in the Creuse department in the Nouvelle-Aquitaine region in central France.

== Geography ==
An area of farming and forestry, lakes and streams comprising the village and a couple of hamlets situated by the banks of the river Rozeille, some 10 miles (16 km) southeast of Aubusson, at the junction of the D10, D18 and the D21 roads.

== Population ==
Historical population
Year	Pop.	±% p.a.
1968	156	—
1975	137	−1.84%
1982	146	+0.91%
1990	127	−1.73%
1999	97	−2.95%
2007	87	−1.35%
2012	73	−3.45%
2017	79	+1.59%
2023	82	+0.62%
Source: INSEE

== Sights ==
- The church, dating from the fourteenth century.
- The Pont de Rouzeline, an ancient stone bridge over the river.

== See also ==
- Communes of the Creuse department
