= Canton of Auzances =

Coordinates: 45°59′35″N 2°28′57″E

Auzances
- Canton
- Interactive map of Auzances
- Country: France
- Region: Nouvelle-Aquitaine
- Department: Creuse
- No. of communes: {{{nbcomm}}}
- Area: 702.39 km^{2} (271.19 sq mi)
- Population (2023): 7,389
  - Density: 10.52/km^{2} (27.25/sq mi)
- INSEE code: 23 03

The Canton of Auzances is a canton situated in the Creuse département and in the Nouvelle-Aquitaine region of central France.

== Geography ==
A farming and woodland area, with the town of Auzances, in the arrondissement of Aubusson, at its centre. The altitude varies from 390m (Charron) to 776m (Chard) with an average altitude of 603m.

== Composition ==
At the French canton reorganisation which came into effect in March 2015, the canton was expanded from 12 to 35 communes:

- Auzances
- Basville
- Beissat
- Brousse
- Bussière-Nouvelle
- Chard
- Charron
- Châtelard
- Clairavaux
- Le Compas
- La Courtine
- Crocq
- Dontreix
- Flayat
- Lioux-les-Monges
- Magnat-l'Étrange
- Malleret
- Les Mars
- Le Mas-d'Artige
- La Mazière-aux-Bons-Hommes
- Mérinchal
- Pontcharraud
- Rougnat
- Saint-Agnant-près-Crocq
- Saint-Bard
- Saint-Georges-Nigremont
- Saint-Martial-le-Vieux
- Saint-Maurice-près-Crocq
- Saint-Merd-la-Breuille
- Saint-Oradoux-de-Chirouze
- Saint-Oradoux-près-Crocq
- Saint-Pardoux-d'Arnet
- Sermur
- La Villeneuve
- La Villetelle

== Population ==
Historical population
Year	Pop.	±% p.a.
2013	7,860	—
2018	7,767	−0.24%
Source: INSEE

== See also ==
- Creuse
- Arrondissements of the Creuse department
- Cantons of the Creuse department
- Communes of the Creuse department
