= Malleret =

Commune in Nouvelle-Aquitaine, France

- Commune
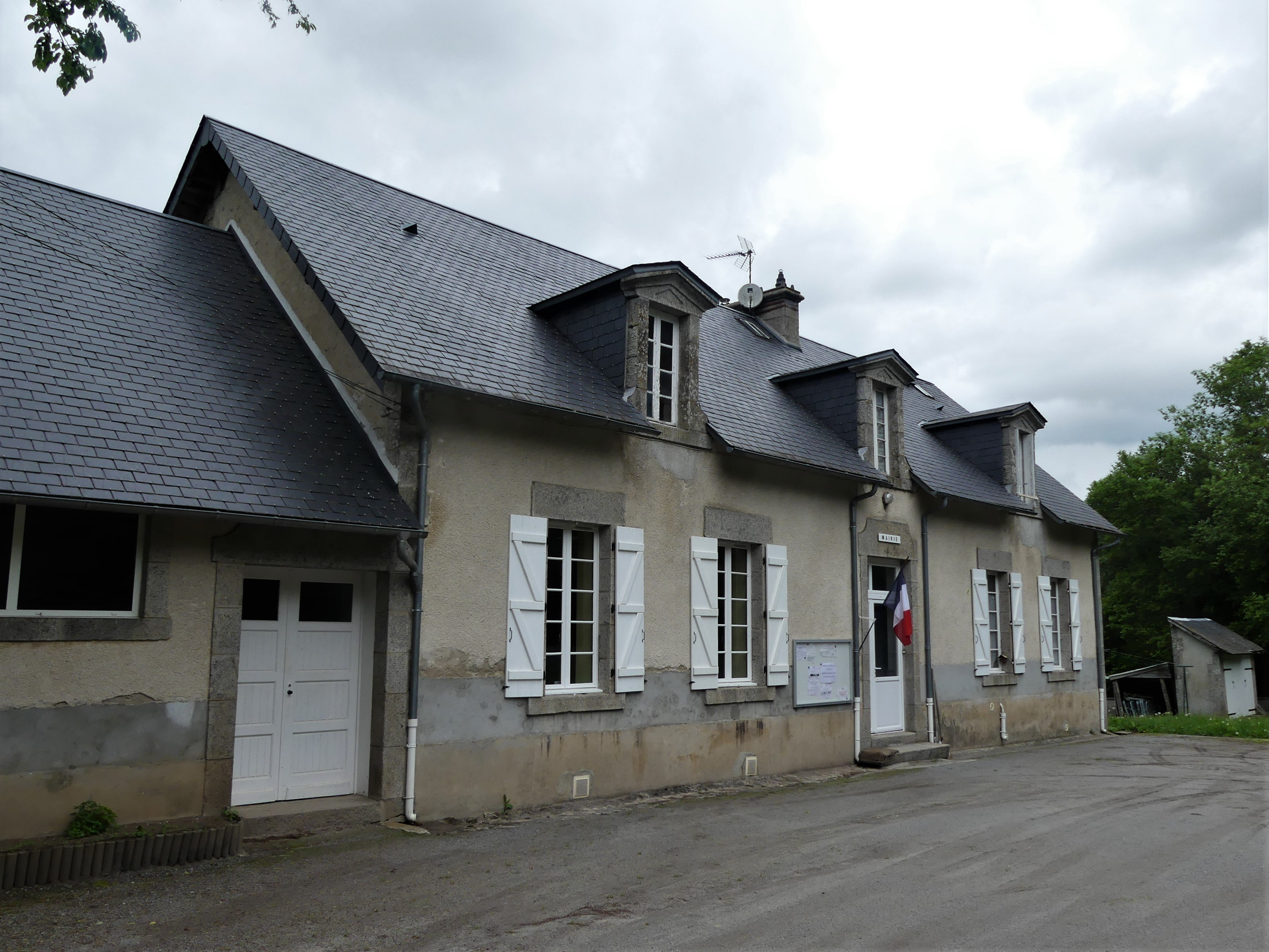
- Town hall
- Location of Malleret
- Location within France Location within Nouvelle-Aquitaine
- Coordinates: 45°46′00″N 2°19′10″E
- Country: France
- Region: Nouvelle-Aquitaine
- Department: Creuse
- Arrondissement: Aubusson
- Canton: Auzances
- Intercommunality: Haute-Corrèze Communauté

Government
  - Mayor (2020–2026): Michel Lacrocq
- Area^{1}: 11.8 km^{2} (4.6 sq mi)
- Highest elevation: 869 m (2,851 ft)
- Lowest elevation: 716 m (2,349 ft)
- Population (2023): 45
  - Density: 3.8/km^{2} (9.9/sq mi)
- Time zone: UTC+01:00 (CET)
  - Summer (DST): UTC+02:00 (CEST)
- INSEE/Postal code: 23119 /23260
- ^{1} French Land Register data, which excludes lakes, ponds, glaciers > 1 km^{2} (0.386 sq mi or 247 acres) and river estuaries.

Malleret (French pronunciation: [malʁɛ]; Occitan: Malerèt) is a commune in the Creuse department in the Nouvelle-Aquitaine region in central France.

== Geography ==
A small village of farming and forestry situated some 15 miles (24 km) southeast of Aubusson, at the junction of the D29 and the D18 roads. The commune lies within the natural park of the Millevaches (1000 lakes, not cows).

== Population ==
Historical population
Year	Pop.	±% p.a.
1968	89	—
1975	75	−2.42%
1982	61	−2.91%
1990	44	−4.00%
1999	46	+0.50%
2007	40	−1.73%
2012	41	+0.50%
2017	44	+1.42%
2023	45	+0.38%
Source: INSEE

== Sights ==
- The church of St. John, dating from the thirteenth century.
- The feudal château at Segourzat.
- A sixteenth-century stone cross.
- Vestiges of a château at Galmaud.

== See also ==
- Communes of the Creuse department
