= Saint-Bard =

Commune in Nouvelle-Aquitaine, France

- Commune
- Location of Saint-Bard
- Location within France Location within Nouvelle-Aquitaine
- Coordinates: 45°54′54″N 2°24′03″E
- Country: France
- Region: Nouvelle-Aquitaine
- Department: Creuse
- Arrondissement: Aubusson
- Canton: Auzances
- Intercommunality: CC Marche et Combraille en Aquitaine

Government
  - Mayor (2020–2026): Sébastien Chefdeville
- Area^{1}: 9.36 km^{2} (3.61 sq mi)
- Elevation: 645 m (2,116 ft)
- Highest elevation: 787 m (2,582 ft)
- Lowest elevation: 631 m (2,070 ft)
- Population (2023): 93
  - Density: 9.9/km^{2} (26/sq mi)
- Time zone: UTC+01:00 (CET)
  - Summer (DST): UTC+02:00 (CEST)
- INSEE/Postal code: 23184 /23260
- ^{1} French Land Register data, which excludes lakes, ponds, glaciers > 1 km^{2} (0.386 sq mi or 247 acres) and river estuaries.

Saint-Bard (French pronunciation: [sɛ̃ baʁ]; Occitan: Sent Bard) is a commune in the Creuse department in central France.

== Population ==
Historical population
Year	Pop.	±% p.a.
1968	142	—
1975	133	−0.93%
1982	114	−2.18%
1990	117	+0.33%
1999	101	−1.62%
2007	105	+0.49%
2012	107	+0.38%
2017	103	−0.76%
2023	93	−1.69%
Source: INSEE

== See also ==
- Communes of the Creuse department
