= Clairavaux =

Commune in Nouvelle-Aquitaine, France

- Commune
- Location of Clairavaux
- Location within France Location within Nouvelle-Aquitaine
- Coordinates: 45°47′02″N 2°10′04″E
- Country: France
- Region: Nouvelle-Aquitaine
- Department: Creuse
- Arrondissement: Aubusson
- Canton: Auzances
- Intercommunality: Haute-Corrèze Communauté

Government
  - Mayor (2020–2026): Laurence Boyer
- Area^{1}: 27.55 km^{2} (10.64 sq mi)
- Elevation: 745 m (2,444 ft)
- Highest elevation: 876 m (2,874 ft)
- Lowest elevation: 595 m (1,952 ft)
- Population (2023): 151
  - Density: 5.48/km^{2} (14.2/sq mi)
- Time zone: UTC+01:00 (CET)
  - Summer (DST): UTC+02:00 (CEST)
- INSEE/Postal code: 23063 /23500
- ^{1} French Land Register data, which excludes lakes, ponds, glaciers > 1 km^{2} (0.386 sq mi or 247 acres) and river estuaries.

Clairavaux (French pronunciation: [klɛʁavo]; Occitan: Claravau) is a commune in the Creuse department in the Nouvelle-Aquitaine region in central France.

== Geography ==
A small forestry and farming village situated by the banks of the Creuse, some 13 miles (21 km) south of Aubusson at the junction of the D31 and the D982 roads.

== Population ==
Historical population
Year	Pop.	±% p.a.
1968	247	—
1975	204	−2.70%
1982	148	−4.48%
1990	171	+1.82%
1999	152	−1.30%
2007	155	+0.24%
2012	149	−0.79%
2017	156	+0.92%
2023	151	−0.54%
Source: INSEE

== Sights ==
The French Ministry of Culture lists several historic monuments in Clairavaux:

- The twelfth-century church, Église Saint-Roch et de l'Assomption de Notre-Dame
- The remains of a feudal castle, the Château fort de Puyravaux, at Branges
- A 13th-century chapel, previously the parish church Église Paroissiale Sainte-Anne et Saint-Louis, at Boucheresse
- A 12th-century stone cross

A memorial commemorates two members of the French Resistance, killed by the Wehrmacht on 14 July 1944 at Clairavaux.

== See also ==
- Communes of the Creuse department
