= Crocq =

Commune in Nouvelle-Aquitaine, France

- Commune
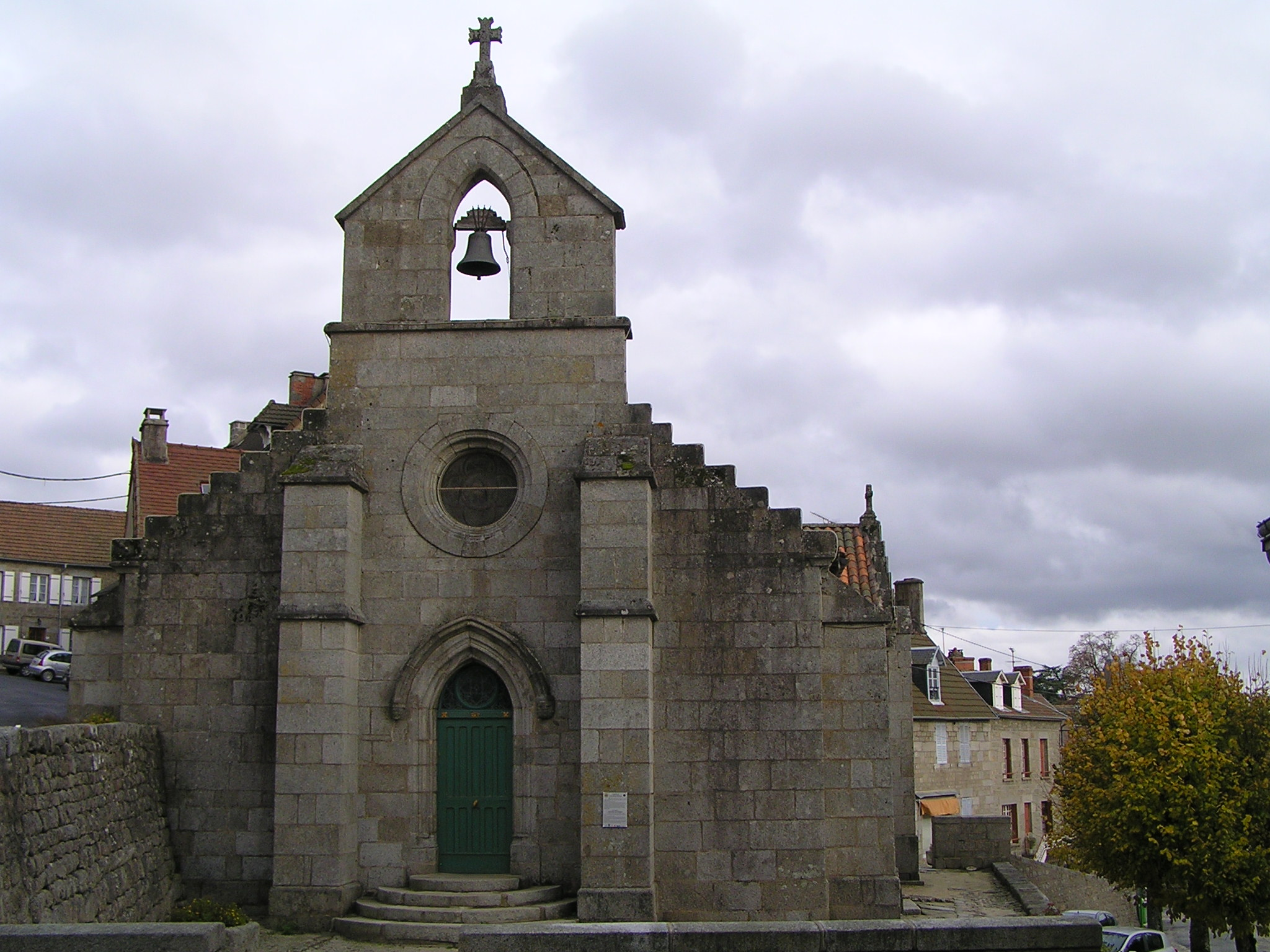
- The Chapel of the Visitation, in Crocq

- Coat of arms
- Location of Crocq
- Location within France Location within Nouvelle-Aquitaine
- Coordinates: 45°52′09″N 2°22′05″E
- Country: France
- Region: Nouvelle-Aquitaine
- Department: Creuse
- Arrondissement: Aubusson
- Canton: Auzances
- Intercommunality: CC Marche et Combraille en Aquitaine

Government
  - Mayor (2020–2026): Jean-Luc Pierron
- Area^{1}: 14.16 km^{2} (5.47 sq mi)
- Highest elevation: 829 m (2,720 ft)
- Lowest elevation: 640 m (2,100 ft)
- Population (2023): 389
  - Density: 27.5/km^{2} (71.2/sq mi)
- Time zone: UTC+01:00 (CET)
  - Summer (DST): UTC+02:00 (CEST)
- INSEE/Postal code: 23069 /23260
- ^{1} French Land Register data, which excludes lakes, ponds, glaciers > 1 km^{2} (0.386 sq mi or 247 acres) and river estuaries.

Crocq (French pronunciation: [kʁo]; Occitan: Cròc) is a commune in the Creuse department in the Nouvelle-Aquitaine region in central France.

== Geography ==
An area of lakes, streams and farming comprising the village and a couple of hamlets, some 21 kilometres (13 mi) southeast of Aubusson at the junction of the D10, D28 and the D996 roads.

The Chavanon (locally called la Ramade) has its source in the southeastern part of the commune, near the hamlet le Montel-Guillaume.

The river Tardes forms all of the commune's northeastern boundary.

== Population ==
Historical population
Year	Pop.	±% p.a.
1968	746	—
1975	844	+1.78%
1982	834	−0.17%
1990	674	−2.63%
1999	546	−2.31%
2007	501	−1.07%
2012	405	−4.17%
2017	411	+0.29%
2023	389	−0.91%
Source: INSEE

== Sights ==
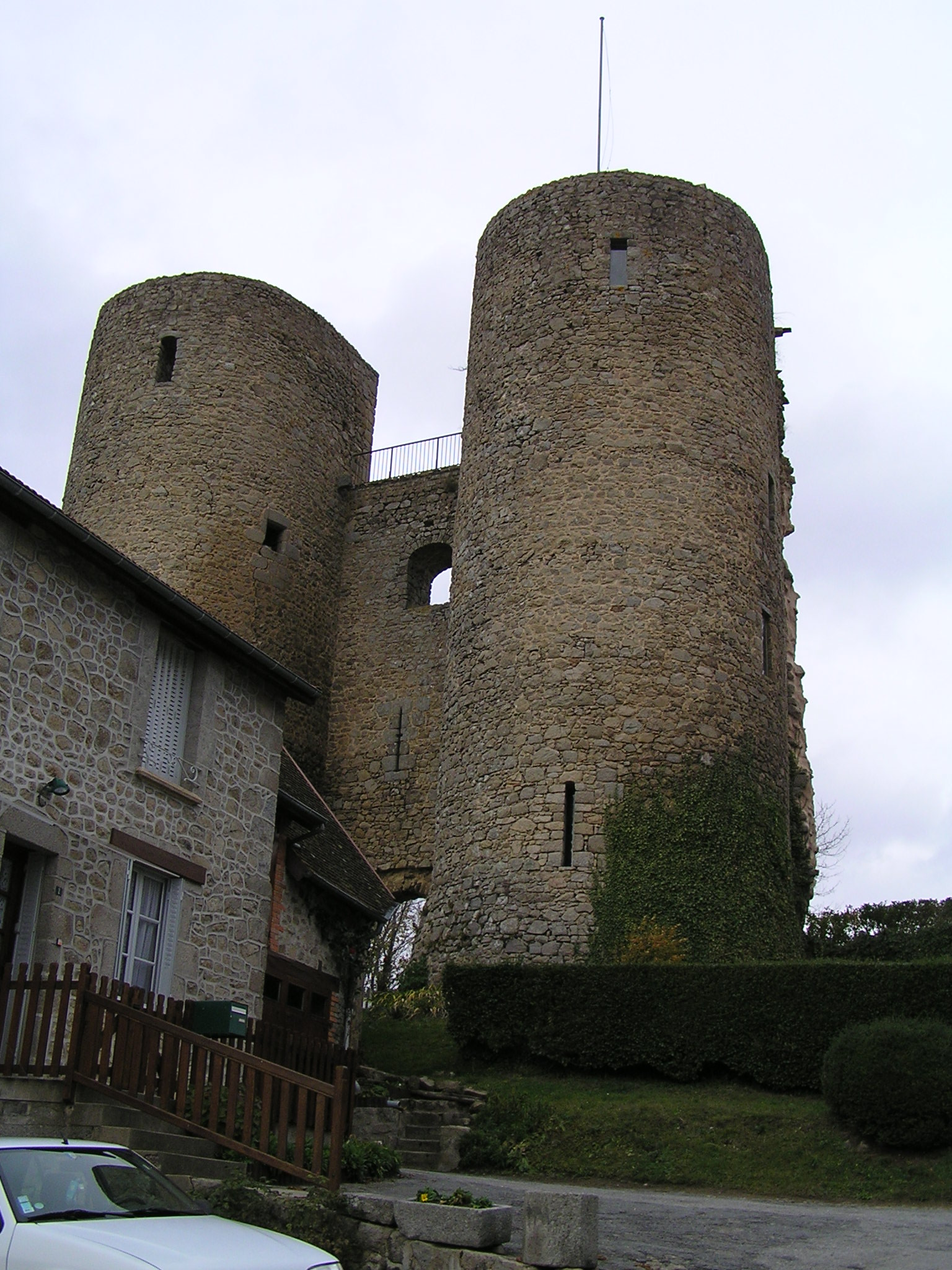
The castle

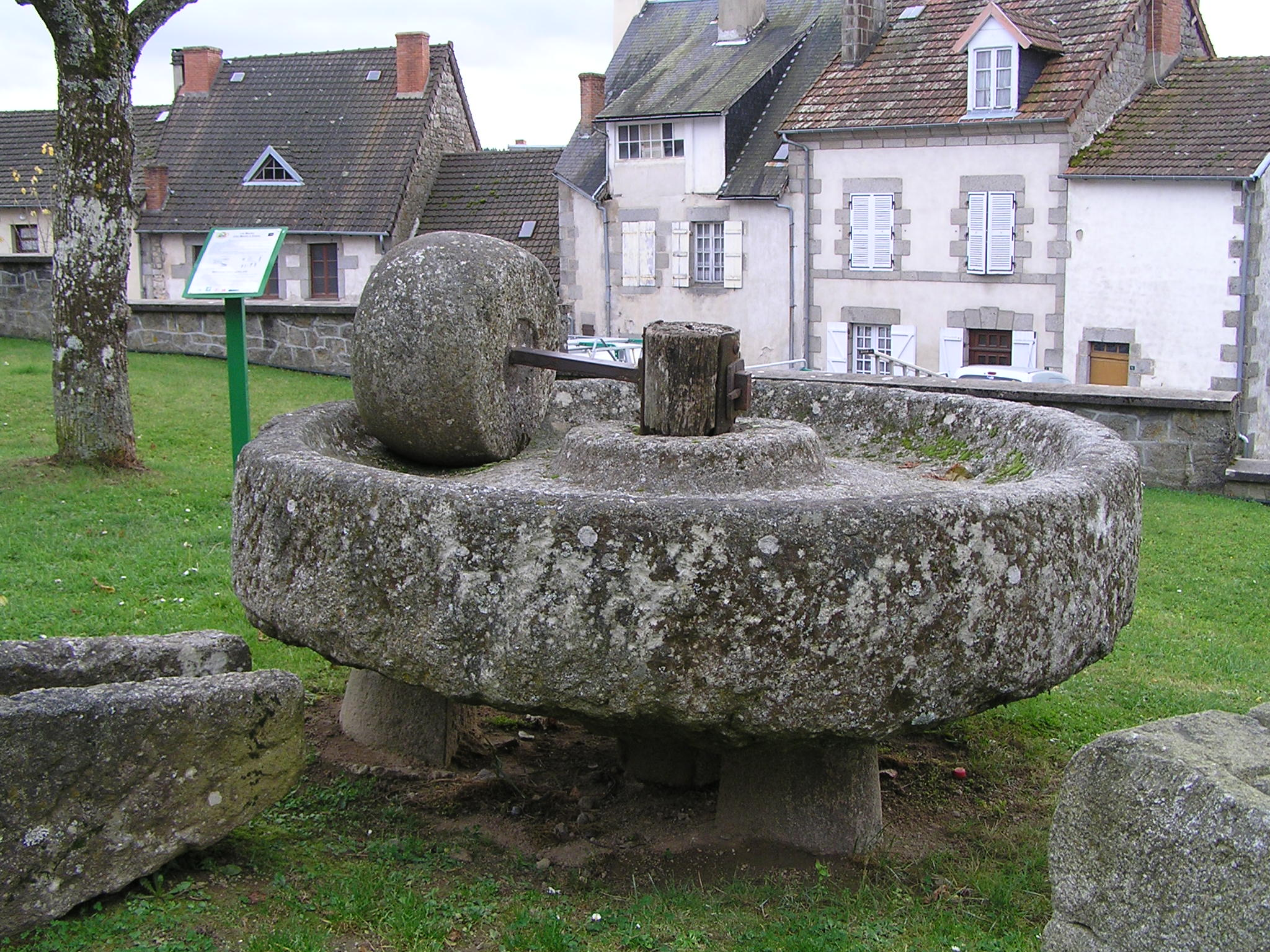
The oil-press

- The remaining towers of a twelfth-century castle.
- A thirteenth-century church of St. John at Montel-Guillaume.
- The nineteenth-century church of St. Eloi.
- The twelfth-century chapel of Notre-Dame.
- A dolmen in the forest.
- Several 16th- and 17th-century houses
- A racing car museum at Mas du Clos.
- A display of machines and tools once used in the fur factory.

== See also ==
- Communes of the Creuse department
