= Communauté de communes d'Évaux-les-Bains Chambon-sur-Voueize =

Coordinates: 46.1747°N 2.4864°E

Évaux-les-Bains Chambon-sur-Voueize
- Former communauté de communes
- Interactive map of Évaux-les-Bains Chambon-sur-Voueize
- Country: France
- Region: Nouvelle-Aquitaine
- Department: Creuse
- No. of communes: {{{nbcomm}}}
- Established: 2002
- Disbanded: 2017
- Population (1999): 5,720

The communauté de communes d’Évaux-les-Bains Chambon-sur-Voueize was located in the Creuse département of the Limousin region of central France. It was created in January 2002. It was merged into the new Communauté de communes Creuse Confluence in January 2017.

It comprised the following 13 communes:

- Auge
- Budelière
- Chambonchard
- Chambon-sur-Voueize
- Évaux-les-Bains
- Lépaud
- Lussat
- Nouhant
- Saint-Julien-la-Genête
- Saint-Priest
- Tardes
- Verneiges
- Viersat

== See also ==
- Communes of the Creuse department
