= Canton of Chambon-sur-Voueize =

Coordinates: 46°12′18″N 2°21′26″E

Chambon-sur-Voueize
- Former canton
- Interactive map of Chambon-sur-Voueize
- Country: France
- Region: Nouvelle-Aquitaine
- Department: Creuse
- No. of communes: {{{nbcomm}}}
- Disbanded: 2015
- Area: 257.55 km^{2} (99.44 sq mi)
- Population (2012): 3,888
  - Density: 15.10/km^{2} (39.10/sq mi)

The Canton of Chambon-sur-Voueize is a former canton situated in the Creuse département and in the Limousin region of central France. It was disbanded following the French canton reorganisation which came into effect in March 2015. It had 3,888 inhabitants (2012).

== Geography ==
A farming and woodland area, with the town of Chambon-sur-Voueize, in the arrondissement of Aubusson, at its centre. The altitude varies from 293m (Budelière) to 555m (Nouhant) with an average altitude of 409m.

The canton comprised 11 communes:

- Auge
- Budelière
- Chambon-sur-Voueize
- Lépaud
- Lussat
- Nouhant
- Saint-Julien-le-Châtel
- Saint-Loup
- Tardes
- Verneiges
- Viersat

== Population ==
Historical population Canton of Chambon-sur-Voueize
Year	1962	1968	1975	1982	1990	1999
Pop.	4,794	5,310	4,604	4,411	4,133	3,877
±%	—	+10.8%	−13.3%	−4.2%	−6.3%	−6.2%
From the year 1962 on: No double counting – residents of multiple communes (e.g. students and military personnel) are counted only once. Source: INSEE

== See also ==
- Arrondissements of the Creuse department
- Cantons of the Creuse department
- Communes of the Creuse department
