= Canton of Bellegarde-en-Marche =

Coordinates: 45°59′53″N 2°18′40″E

Bellegarde-en-Marche
- Former canton
- Interactive map of Bellegarde-en-Marche
- Country: France
- Region: Nouvelle-Aquitaine
- Department: Creuse
- No. of communes: {{{nbcomm}}}
- Disbanded: 2015
- Area: 173.01 km^{2} (66.80 sq mi)
- Population (2012): 2,599
  - Density: 15.02/km^{2} (38.91/sq mi)

The Canton of Bellegarde-en-Marche is a former canton situated in the Creuse département and in the Limousin region of central France. It was disbanded following the French canton reorganisation which came into effect in March 2015. It consisted of 9 communes, which joined the canton of Aubusson in 2015. It had 2,599 inhabitants (2012).

== Geography ==
A farming and woodland area, with the town of Bellegarde-en-Marche, in the arrondissement of Aubusson, at its centre. The altitude varies from 422m (Saint-Domet) to 727m (Mautes) with an average altitude of 576m.

The canton comprised 9 communes:

- Bellegarde-en-Marche
- Bosroger
- Champagnat
- La Chaussade
- Lupersat
- Mainsat
- Mautes
- Saint-Domet
- Saint-Silvain-Bellegarde

== Population ==
Historical population Canton of Bellegarde-en-Marche
| Year | 1962 | 1968 | 1975 | 1982 | 1990 | 1999 |
| Pop. | 3,274 | 3,640 | 3,164 | 3,032 | 2,876 | 2,676 |
| ±% | — | +11.2% | −13.1% | −4.2% | −5.1% | −7.0% |
From the year 1962 on: No double counting – residents of multiple communes (e.g. students and military personnel) are counted only once. Source: INSEE

== See also ==
- Arrondissements of the Creuse department
- Cantons of the Creuse department
- Communes of the Creuse department
