= Canton of Royère-de-Vassivière =

Coordinates: 45°53′01″N 1°49′46″E

Royère-de-Vassivière
- Former canton
- Interactive map of Royère-de-Vassivière
- Country: France
- Region: Nouvelle-Aquitaine
- Department: Creuse
- No. of communes: {{{nbcomm}}}
- Disbanded: 2015
- Area: 238.67 km^{2} (92.15 sq mi)
- Population (2012): 1,796
  - Density: 7.525/km^{2} (19.49/sq mi)

The Canton of Royère-de-Vassivière was a canton situated in the Creuse département and in the Limousin region of central France. It was disbanded following the French canton reorganisation which came into effect in March 2015. It had 1,796 inhabitants (2012).

== Geography ==
An area of farming, forestry and quarrying, with the town of Royère-de-Vassivière, in the arrondissement of Aubusson, at its centre. The altitude varies from 363m (Saint-Moreil) to 829m (Royère-de-Vassivière) with an average altitude of 619m.

The canton comprised 7 communes:

- Le Monteil-au-Vicomte
- Royère-de-Vassivière
- Saint-Junien-la-Bregère
- Saint-Martin-Château
- Saint-Moreil
- Saint-Pardoux-Morterolles
- Saint-Pierre-Bellevue

== Population ==
Historical population Canton of Royère-de-Vassivière
Year	1962	1968	1975	1982	1990	1999
Pop.	2,585	2,911	2,521	2,420	2,106	1,970
±%	—	+12.6%	−13.4%	−4.0%	−13.0%	−6.5%
From the year 1962 on: No double counting – residents of multiple communes (e.g. students and military personnel) are counted only once. Source: INSEE

== See also ==
- Arrondissements of the Creuse department
- Cantons of the Creuse department
- Communes of the Creuse department
