= Tardes (river) =

River in France

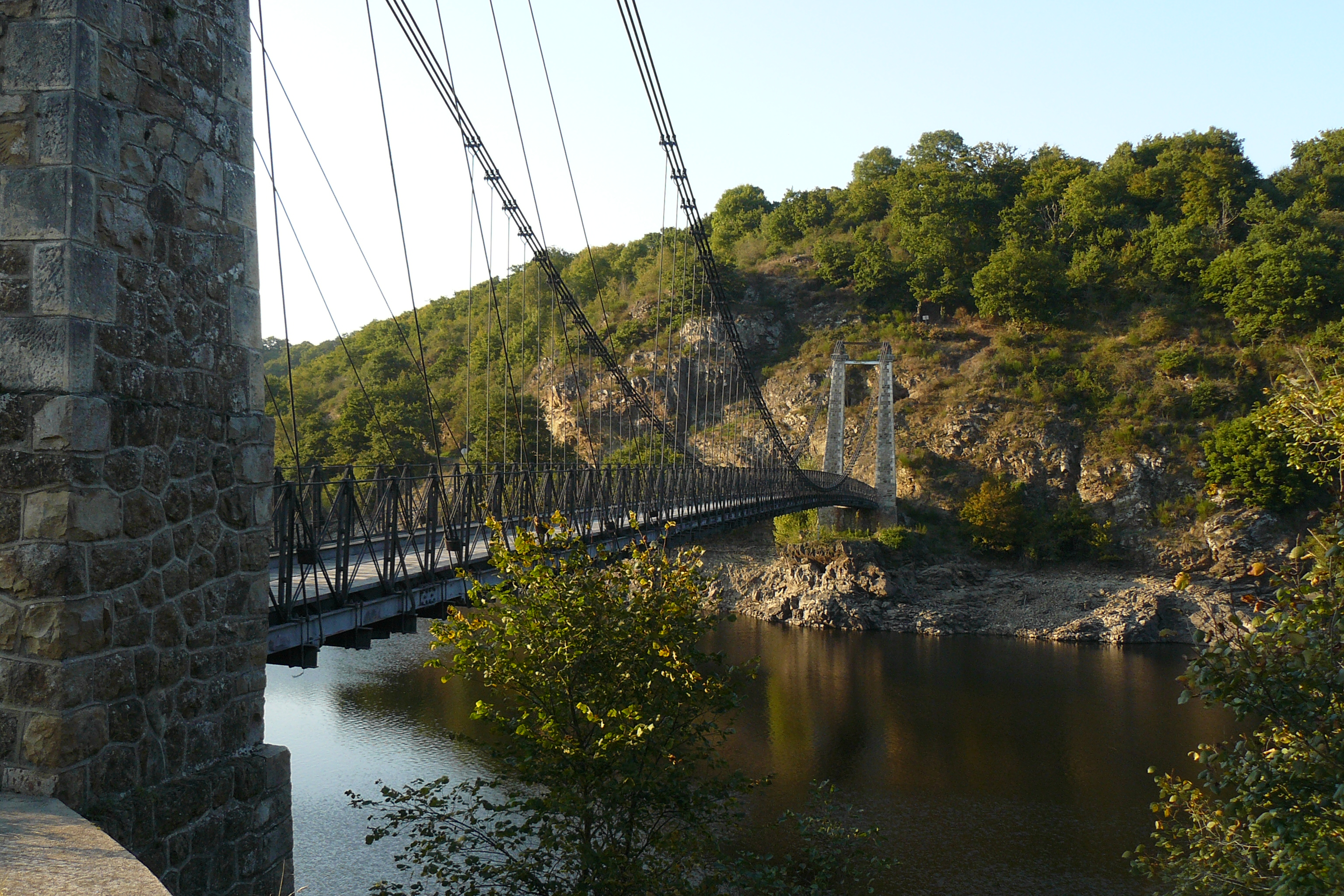
- The suspension bridge over the Tardes, between Budelière and Évaux-les-Bains

- Location within France Location within Nouvelle-Aquitaine

Location
- Country: France

Physical characteristics
- Source
  - location: Basville
  - coordinates: 45°52′39″N 02°25′06″E
  - elevation: 720 m (2,360 ft)
- Mouth
  - location: Cher
  - coordinates: 46°14′15″N 02°30′48″E
  - elevation: 290 m (950 ft)
- Length: 77.3 km (48.0 mi)
- Basin size: 972 km^{2} (375 sq mi)
- Discharge
  - average: 9.09 m^{3}/s (321 cu ft/s)

Basin features
- Progression: Cher→ Loire→ Atlantic Ocean

The Tardes (French pronunciation: [taʁd]; Occitan: Tard) is a 77.3-kilometre-long (48.0 mi) river in the Creuse département, central France. Its source is at Basville. It flows generally north. It is a left tributary of the Cher into which it flows between Évaux-les-Bains and Budelière.

Its main tributary is the Voueize.

== Communes along its course ==
This list is ordered from source to mouth: Basville, Saint-Oradoux-près-Crocq, Crocq, Saint-Pardoux-d'Arnet, La Villetelle, Saint-Avit-de-Tardes, Saint-Silvain-Bellegarde, Lupersat, Champagnat, Saint-Domet, La Serre-Bussière-Vieille, Peyrat-la-Nonière, Saint-Priest, Le Chauchet, Saint-Julien-le-Châtel, Tardes, Lussat, Chambon-sur-Voueize, Évaux-les-Bains, Budelière
