= Arfeuille-Châtain =

Commune in Nouvelle-Aquitaine, France

- Commune
- Location of Arfeuille-Châtain
- Location within France Location within Nouvelle-Aquitaine
- Coordinates: 46°03′58″N 2°26′15″E
- Country: France
- Region: Nouvelle-Aquitaine
- Department: Creuse
- Arrondissement: Aubusson
- Canton: Évaux-les-Bains
- Intercommunality: CC Marche et Combraille en Aquitaine

Government
  - Mayor (2020–2026): Béatrice Descloux
- Area^{1}: 20.5 km^{2} (7.9 sq mi)
- Elevation: 510 m (1,670 ft)
- Highest elevation: 690 m (2,260 ft)
- Lowest elevation: 493 m (1,617 ft)
- Population (2023): 193
  - Density: 9.41/km^{2} (24.4/sq mi)
- Time zone: UTC+01:00 (CET)
  - Summer (DST): UTC+02:00 (CEST)
- INSEE/Postal code: 23005 /23700
- ^{1} French Land Register data, which excludes lakes, ponds, glaciers > 1 km^{2} (0.386 sq mi or 247 acres) and river estuaries.

Arfeuille-Châtain (French pronunciation: [aʁfœj ʃatɛ̃]; Occitan: Arfuelha Chastenh) is a commune in the Creuse department in the Nouvelle-Aquitaine region in central France.

== Geography ==
An area of lakes, forestry and farming comprising several hamlets situated some 14 miles (23 km) northeast of Aubusson at the junction of the D4 and the D27 roads.

== Population ==
Historical population
Year	Pop.	±% p.a.
1968	319	—
1975	246	−3.64%
1982	190	−3.62%
1990	167	−1.60%
1999	168	+0.07%
2007	177	+0.65%
2012	193	+1.75%
2017	192	−0.10%
2023	193	+0.09%
Source: INSEE

== Sights ==
- The churches in the two main villages, both dating from the seventeenth century.

== See also ==
- Communes of the Creuse department
