= Fontanières =

Commune in Nouvelle-Aquitaine, France

- Commune
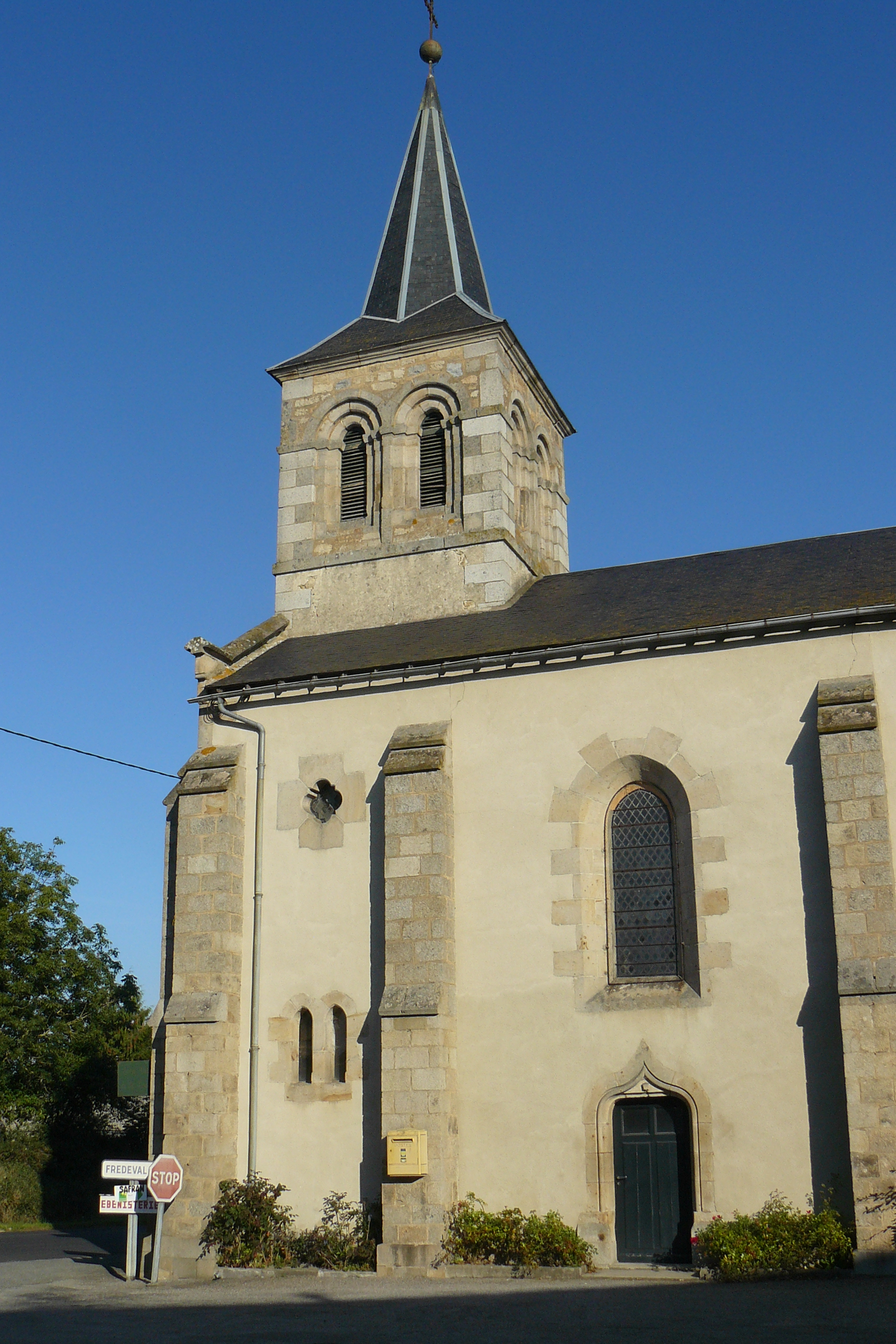
- The Church of Our Lady of the Road, in Fontanières

- Coat of arms
- Location of Fontanières
- Location within France Location within Nouvelle-Aquitaine
- Coordinates: 46°06′34″N 2°30′05″E
- Country: France
- Region: Nouvelle-Aquitaine
- Department: Creuse
- Arrondissement: Aubusson
- Canton: Évaux-les-Bains
- Intercommunality: CC Marche et Combraille en Aquitaine

Government
  - Mayor (2020–2026): Manuel Novais
- Area^{1}: 15.91 km^{2} (6.14 sq mi)
- Elevation: 548 m (1,798 ft)
- Highest elevation: 575 m (1,886 ft)
- Lowest elevation: 390 m (1,280 ft)
- Population (2023): 260
  - Density: 16/km^{2} (42/sq mi)
- Time zone: UTC+01:00 (CET)
  - Summer (DST): UTC+02:00 (CEST)
- INSEE/Postal code: 23083 /23110
- ^{1} French Land Register data, which excludes lakes, ponds, glaciers > 1 km^{2} (0.386 sq mi or 247 acres) and river estuaries.

Fontanières (French pronunciation: [fɔ̃tanjɛʁ]; Occitan: Fontanieras) is a commune in the Creuse department in the Nouvelle-Aquitaine region in central France.

== Geography ==
A farming village and a couple of hamlets situated some 19 miles (31 km) northeast of Aubusson, at the junction of the D24, D25 and the D996 roads. The commune has an eastern border with the department of Allier and is served by a TER railway.

== Population ==
Historical population
Year	Pop.	±% p.a.
1968	361	—
1975	336	−1.02%
1982	277	−2.72%
1990	279	+0.09%
1999	259	−0.82%
2007	257	−0.10%
2012	258	+0.08%
2017	249	−0.71%
2023	260	+0.72%
Source: INSEE

== Sights ==
- The nineteenth-century church of Notre-Dame.
- A château in ruins at Salvert.

== See also ==
- Communes of the Creuse department
