= Chambonchard =

Commune in Nouvelle-Aquitaine, France

- Commune
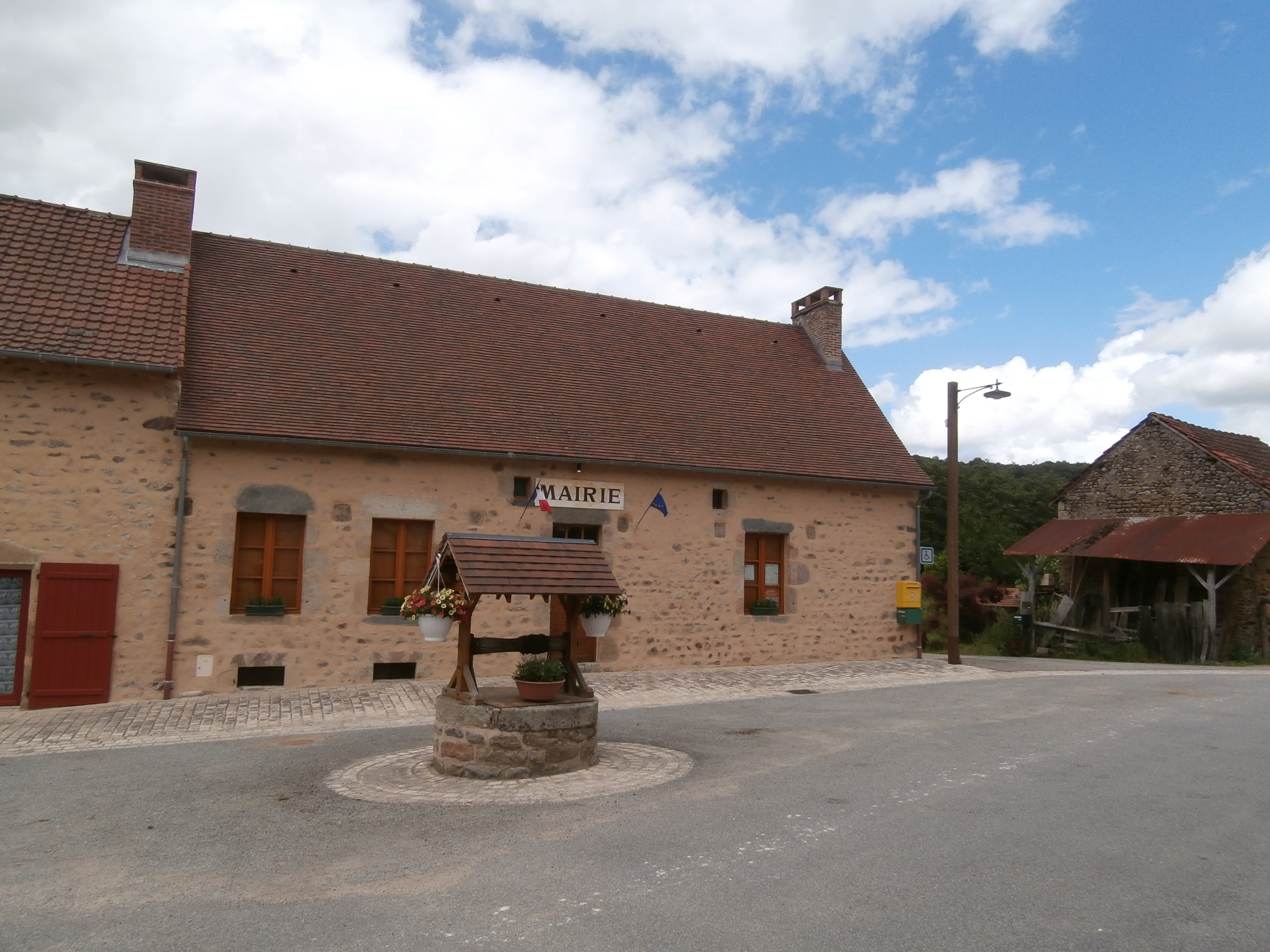
- The town hall in Chambonchard
- Location of Chambonchard
- Location within France Location within Nouvelle-Aquitaine
- Coordinates: 46°10′00″N 2°32′12″E
- Country: France
- Region: Nouvelle-Aquitaine
- Department: Creuse
- Arrondissement: Aubusson
- Canton: Évaux-les-Bains
- Intercommunality: CC Creuse Confluence

Government
  - Mayor (2020–2026): Bernard Tourand
- Area^{1}: 12.86 km^{2} (4.97 sq mi)
- Highest elevation: 518 m (1,699 ft)
- Lowest elevation: 310 m (1,020 ft)
- Population (2023): 83
  - Density: 6.5/km^{2} (17/sq mi)
- Time zone: UTC+01:00 (CET)
  - Summer (DST): UTC+02:00 (CEST)
- INSEE/Postal code: 23046 /23110
- ^{1} French Land Register data, which excludes lakes, ponds, glaciers > 1 km^{2} (0.386 sq mi or 247 acres) and river estuaries.

Chambonchard (French pronunciation: [ʃɑ̃bɔ̃ʃaʁ]) is a commune in the Creuse department in the Nouvelle-Aquitaine region in central France.

== Geography ==
An area of lakes, forestry and farming comprising a small village and several hamlets, situated by the banks of the river Cher, the border with the département of Allier, some 12 miles (19 km) south of Montluçon at the junction of the D20, D25 and the D915 roads.

== Population ==
Historical population
Year	Pop.	±% p.a.
1968	175	—
1975	155	−1.72%
1982	129	−2.59%
1990	116	−1.32%
1999	84	−3.52%
2007	81	−0.45%
2012	86	+1.21%
2017	82	−0.95%
2023	83	+0.20%
Source: INSEE

== Sights ==
- The church of St. Martin, dating from the twelfth century.
- The medieval castle of Ligondeix.

== See also ==
- Communes of the Creuse department
