= Sannat, Creuse =

Commune in Nouvelle-Aquitaine, France

Sannat
- Commune
- Location of Sannat
- Location within France Location within Nouvelle-Aquitaine
- Coordinates: 46°07′13″N 2°24′30″E
- Country: France
- Region: Nouvelle-Aquitaine
- Department: Creuse
- Arrondissement: Aubusson
- Canton: Évaux-les-Bains
- Intercommunality: CC Marche et Combraille en Aquitaine

Government
  - Mayor (2020–2026): David Grange
- Area^{1}: 34 km^{2} (13 sq mi)
- Elevation: 490 m (1,610 ft)
- Highest elevation: 584 m (1,916 ft)
- Lowest elevation: 356 m (1,168 ft)
- Population (2023): 349
  - Density: 10/km^{2} (27/sq mi)
- Time zone: UTC+01:00 (CET)
  - Summer (DST): UTC+02:00 (CEST)
- INSEE/Postal code: 23167 /23110
- ^{1} French Land Register data, which excludes lakes, ponds, glaciers > 1 km^{2} (0.386 sq mi or 247 acres) and river estuaries.

Sannat (French pronunciation: [sana]; Occitan: Sanac) is a commune in the Creuse department in the Nouvelle-Aquitaine region in central France.

== Geography ==
A farming and forestry area comprising the village and several hamlets situated by the banks of both the Chat-Cros and Méouze rivers, some 19 miles (31 km) northeast of Aubusson, near the junction of the D24 and the D19 roads.

== Population ==
Historical population
| Year | Pop. | ±% p.a. |
|---|---|---|
| 1968 | 627 | — |
| 1975 | 571 | −1.33% |
| 1982 | 481 | −2.42% |
| 1990 | 432 | −1.33% |
| 1999 | 370 | −1.71% |
| 2007 | 383 | +0.43% |
| 2012 | 396 | +0.67% |
| 2017 | 344 | −2.78% |
| 2023 | 349 | +0.24% |
Source: INSEE

== Sights ==
- The church, dating from the nineteenth century.
- Two châteaux, at La Ville-du-Bois and at Tirondeix.

== See also ==
- Communes of the Creuse department
