= Reterre =

Commune in Nouvelle-Aquitaine, France

- Commune
- Coat of arms
- Location of Reterre
- Location within France Location within Nouvelle-Aquitaine
- Coordinates: 46°06′14″N 2°28′28″E
- Country: France
- Region: Nouvelle-Aquitaine
- Department: Creuse
- Arrondissement: Aubusson
- Canton: Évaux-les-Bains
- Intercommunality: CC Marche et Combraille en Aquitaine

Government
  - Mayor (2020–2026): Bernadette Meanard
- Area^{1}: 17.54 km^{2} (6.77 sq mi)
- Elevation: 530 m (1,740 ft)
- Highest elevation: 617 m (2,024 ft)
- Lowest elevation: 450 m (1,480 ft)
- Population (2023): 258
  - Density: 14.7/km^{2} (38.1/sq mi)
- Time zone: UTC+01:00 (CET)
  - Summer (DST): UTC+02:00 (CEST)
- INSEE/Postal code: 23160 /23110
- ^{1} French Land Register data, which excludes lakes, ponds, glaciers > 1 km^{2} (0.386 sq mi or 247 acres) and river estuaries.

Reterre (French pronunciation: [ʁətɛʁ]; Occitan: Retèrra) is a commune in the Creuse department in the Nouvelle-Aquitaine region in central France.

== Geography ==
A farming area comprising the village and a few hamlets situated by the banks of the Chat-Cros river, some 18 miles (29 km) northeast of Aubusson, at the junction of the D24 and the D27 roads.

== Population ==
Historical population
Year	Pop.	±% p.a.
1968	476	—
1975	424	−1.64%
1982	380	−1.55%
1990	365	−0.50%
1999	319	−1.49%
2007	307	−0.48%
2012	298	−0.59%
2017	291	−0.47%
2023	258	−1.99%
Source: INSEE

== Sights ==
- The church, dating from the nineteenth century.
- The ruins of a twelfth-century church.
- The ruins of a feudal castle at Malleville.

== See also ==
- Communes of the Creuse department
