= Peyrat-la-Nonière =

Commune in Nouvelle-Aquitaine, France

- Commune
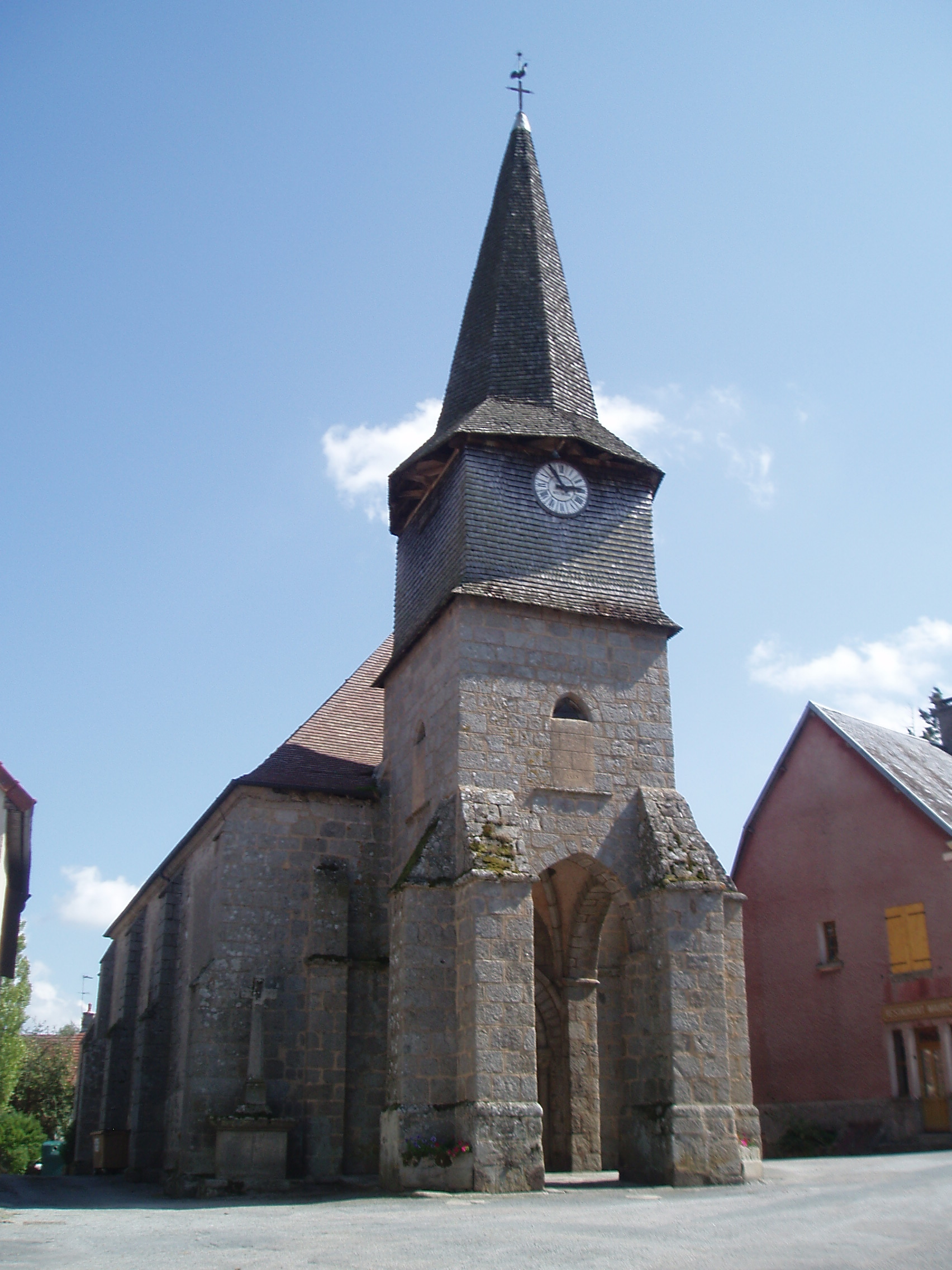
- The church of Peyrat

- Coat of arms
- Location of Peyrat-la-Nonière
- Location within France Location within Nouvelle-Aquitaine
- Coordinates: 46°05′18″N 2°15′26″E
- Country: France
- Region: Nouvelle-Aquitaine
- Department: Creuse
- Arrondissement: Aubusson
- Canton: Gouzon
- Intercommunality: CC Marche et Combraille en Aquitaine

Government
  - Mayor (2020–2026): Alain Luquet
- Area^{1}: 41.4 km^{2} (16.0 sq mi)
- Elevation: 450 m (1,480 ft)
- Highest elevation: 556 m (1,824 ft)
- Lowest elevation: 409 m (1,342 ft)
- Population (2023): 420
  - Density: 10/km^{2} (26/sq mi)
- Time zone: UTC+01:00 (CET)
  - Summer (DST): UTC+02:00 (CEST)
- INSEE/Postal code: 23151 /23130
- ^{1} French Land Register data, which excludes lakes, ponds, glaciers > 1 km^{2} (0.386 sq mi or 247 acres) and river estuaries.

Peyrat-la-Nonière (French pronunciation: [pɛʁa la nɔnjɛʁ]; Occitan: Peirat la Noniera) is a commune in the Creuse department in the Nouvelle-Aquitaine region in central France.

== Geography ==
An area of farming and forestry, lakes and streams comprising the village and several hamlets situated by the banks of the river Voueize, some 10 miles (16 km) north of Aubusson, at the junction of the D4, D54 and the D993 roads.

The river Tardes forms most of the commune's eastern border.

== Population ==
Historical population
Year	Pop.	±% p.a.
1968	786	—
1975	663	−2.40%
1982	609	−1.21%
1990	506	−2.29%
1999	499	−0.15%
2007	463	−0.93%
2012	460	−0.13%
2017	426	−1.52%
2023	420	−0.24%
Source: INSEE

== Sights ==
- The church, dating from the twelfth century.
- The remains of the abbey de Bonlieu.
- The castle of Chiroux.
- The two châteaux, du Mazeau and la Voreille.
- A sixteenth-century chapel.
- An ancient stone bridge over the river Tardes.

== See also ==
- Communes of the Creuse department
