= Arrondissement of Aubusson =

Coordinates: 45.95°N 2.17°E

Aubusson
- Arrondissement
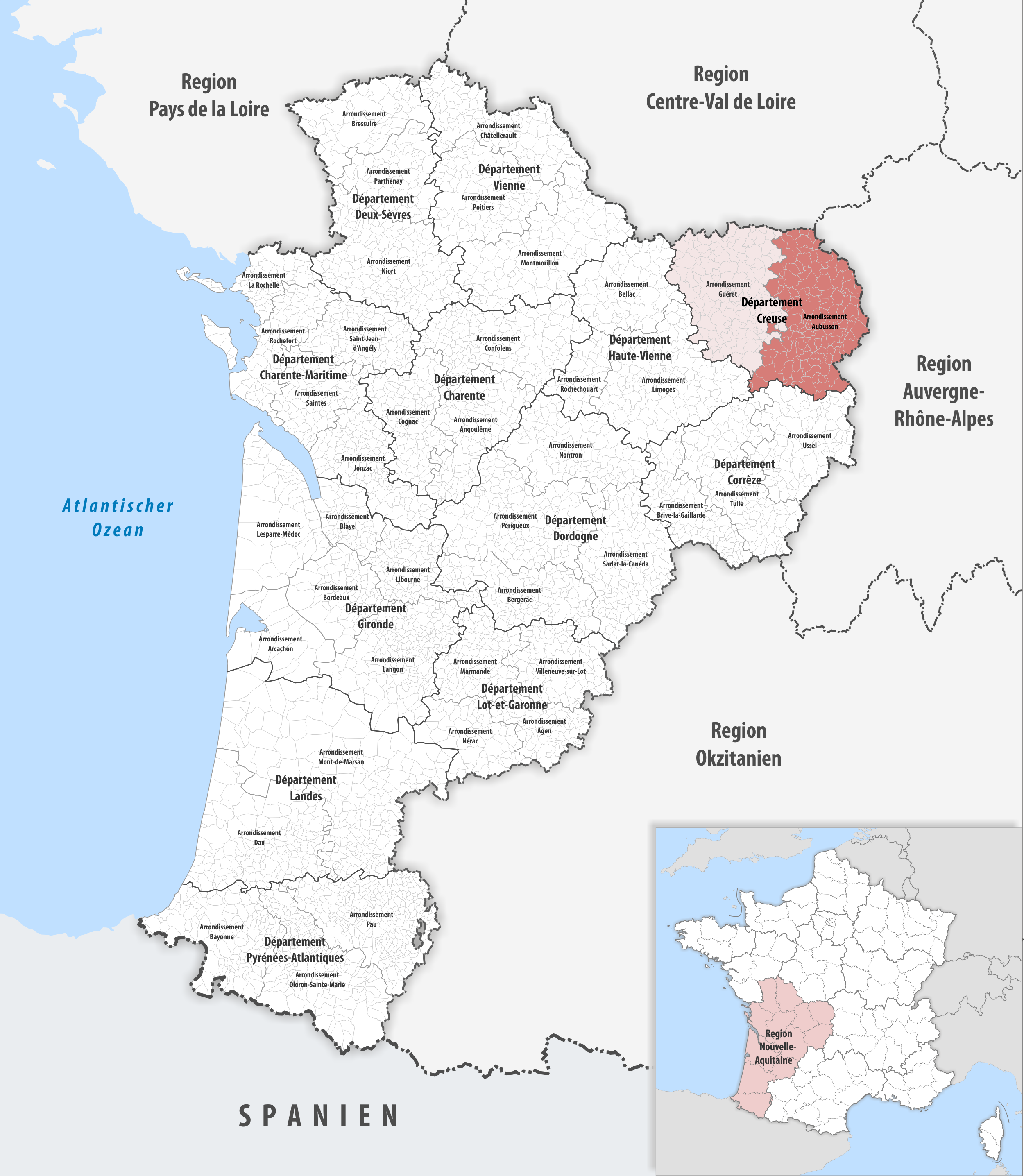
- Location within the region Nouvelle-Aquitaine
- Country: France
- Region: Nouvelle-Aquitaine
- Department: Creuse
- No. of communes: {{{nbcomm}}}
- Area: 2,828.7 km^{2} (1,092.2 sq mi)
- Population (2023): 42,909
  - Density: 15.169/km^{2} (39.288/sq mi)
- INSEE code: 231

The arrondissement of Aubusson is an arrondissement of France in the Creuse department in the Nouvelle-Aquitaine région. It has 128 communes. Its population is 43,116 (2021), and its area is 2,828.7 km^{2} (1,092.2 sq mi).

== Composition ==
The communes of the arrondissement of Aubusson, and their INSEE codes, are:

1. Alleyrat (23003)
2. Arfeuille-Châtain (23005)
3. Aubusson (23008)
4. Auge (23009)
5. Auzances (23013)
6. Basville (23017)
7. Beissat (23019)
8. Bellegarde-en-Marche (23020)
9. Bétête (23022)
10. Blessac (23024)
11. Bord-Saint-Georges (23026)
12. Bosroger (23028)
13. Boussac (23031)
14. Boussac-Bourg (23032)
15. Brousse (23034)
16. Budelière (23035)
17. Bussière-Nouvelle (23037)
18. Bussière-Saint-Georges (23038)
19. La Celle-sous-Gouzon (23040)
20. Chambonchard (23046)
21. Chambon-sur-Voueize (23045)
22. Champagnat (23048)
23. Chard (23053)
24. Charron (23054)
25. Châtelard (23055)
26. Le Chauchet (23058)
27. La Chaussade (23059)
28. Chénérailles (23061)
29. Clairavaux (23063)
30. Clugnat (23064)
31. Le Compas (23066)
32. La Courtine (23067)
33. Cressat (23068)
34. Crocq (23069)
35. Croze (23071)
36. Domeyrot (23072)
37. Dontreix (23073)
38. Évaux-les-Bains (23076)
39. Faux-la-Montagne (23077)
40. Felletin (23079)
41. Féniers (23080)
42. Flayat (23081)
43. Fontanières (23083)
44. Gentioux-Pigerolles (23090)
45. Gioux (23091)
46. Gouzon (23093)
47. Issoudun-Létrieix (23097)
48. Jarnages (23100)
49. Ladapeyre (23102)
50. Lavaufranche (23104)
51. Lavaveix-les-Mines (23105)
52. Lépaud (23106)
53. Leyrat (23108)
54. Lioux-les-Monges (23110)
55. Lupersat (23113)
56. Lussat (23114)
57. Magnat-l'Étrange (23115)
58. Mainsat (23116)
59. Malleret (23119)
60. Malleret-Boussac (23120)
61. Les Mars (23123)
62. Le Mas-d'Artige (23125)
63. Mautes (23127)
64. La Mazière-aux-Bons-Hommes (23129)
65. Mérinchal (23131)
66. Moutier-Rozeille (23140)
67. Néoux (23142)
68. La Nouaille (23144)
69. Nouhant (23145)
70. Nouzerines (23146)
71. Parsac (23149)
72. Peyrat-la-Nonière (23151)
73. Pierrefitte (23152)
74. Pionnat (23154)
75. Pontcharraud (23156)
76. Poussanges (23158)
77. Puy-Malsignat (23159)
78. Reterre (23160)
79. Rougnat (23164)
80. Saint-Agnant-près-Crocq (23178)
81. Saint-Alpinien (23179)
82. Saint-Amand (23180)
83. Saint-Avit-de-Tardes (23182)
84. Saint-Bard (23184)
85. Saint-Chabrais (23185)
86. Saint-Dizier-la-Tour (23187)
87. Saint-Domet (23190)
88. Sainte-Feyre-la-Montagne (23194)
89. Saint-Frion (23196)
90. Saint-Georges-Nigremont (23198)
91. Saint-Julien-la-Genête (23203)
92. Saint-Julien-le-Châtel (23204)
93. Saint-Loup (23209)
94. Saint-Maixant (23210)
95. Saint-Marc-à-Frongier (23211)
96. Saint-Marc-à-Loubaud (23212)
97. Saint-Marien (23213)
98. Saint-Martial-le-Vieux (23215)
99. Saint-Maurice-près-Crocq (23218)
100. Saint-Médard-la-Rochette (23220)
101. Saint-Merd-la-Breuille (23221)
102. Saint-Oradoux-de-Chirouze (23224)
103. Saint-Oradoux-près-Crocq (23225)
104. Saint-Pardoux-d'Arnet (23226)
105. Saint-Pardoux-le-Neuf (23228)
106. Saint-Pardoux-les-Cards (23229)
107. Saint-Pierre-le-Bost (23233)
108. Saint-Priest (23234)
109. Saint-Quentin-la-Chabanne (23238)
110. Saint-Silvain-Bas-le-Roc (23240)
111. Saint-Silvain-Bellegarde (23241)
112. Saint-Silvain-sous-Toulx (23243)
113. Saint-Sulpice-les-Champs (23246)
114. Saint-Yrieix-la-Montagne (23249)
115. Sannat (23167)
116. Sermur (23171)
117. La Serre-Bussière-Vieille (23172)
118. Soumans (23174)
119. Tardes (23251)
120. Toulx-Sainte-Croix (23254)
121. Trois-Fonds (23255)
122. Vallière (23257)
123. Verneiges (23259)
124. Viersat (23261)
125. Vigeville (23262)
126. La Villedieu (23264)
127. La Villeneuve (23265)
128. La Villetelle (23266)

== History ==
The arrondissement of Aubusson was created in 1800. At the March 2017 reorganisation of the arrondissements of Creuse, it gained 28 communes from the arrondissement of Guéret, and it lost 18 communes to the arrondissement of Guéret.

As a result of the reorganisation of the cantons of France which came into effect in 2015, the borders of the cantons are no longer related to the borders of the arrondissements. The cantons of the arrondissement of Aubusson were, as of January 2015:

1. Aubusson
2. Auzances
3. Bellegarde-en-Marche
4. Chambon-sur-Voueize
5. Chénérailles
6. La Courtine
7. Crocq
8. Évaux-les-Bains
9. Felletin
10. Gentioux-Pigerolles
11. Royère-de-Vassivière
12. Saint-Sulpice-les-Champs
