= Canton of Évaux-les-Bains =

Coordinates: 46°07′23″N 2°27′29″E

Évaux-les-Bains
- Canton
- Interactive map of Évaux-les-Bains
- Country: France
- Region: Nouvelle-Aquitaine
- Department: Creuse
- No. of communes: {{{nbcomm}}}
- Area: 404.04 km^{2} (156.00 sq mi)
- Population (2023): 5,992
  - Density: 14.83/km^{2} (38.41/sq mi)
- INSEE code: 23 08

The Canton of Évaux-les-Bains is a canton situated in Creuse, a département and in the Nouvelle-Aquitaine region of central France.

== Geography ==
A farming area, with the town of Évaux-les-Bains, in the arrondissement of Aubusson, at its centre. The altitude varies from 292m (Évaux-les-Bains) to 690m (Arfeuille-Châtain) with an average altitude of 488m.

== Composition ==
At the French canton reorganisation which came into effect in March 2015, the canton was expanded from 8 to 17 communes:

- Arfeuille-Châtain
- Auge
- Budelière
- Chambon-sur-Voueize
- Chambonchard
- Évaux-les-Bains
- Fontanières
- Lépaud
- Lussat
- Nouhant
- Reterre
- Saint-Julien-la-Genête
- Saint-Priest
- Sannat
- Tardes
- Verneiges
- Viersat

== Population ==
Historical population
Year	Pop.	±% p.a.
2013	6,545	—
2018	6,173	−1.16%
Source: INSEE

== See also ==
- Arrondissements of the Creuse department
- Cantons of the Creuse department
- Communes of the Creuse department
