= Pierrefitte, Creuse =

Commune in Nouvelle-Aquitaine, France

Pierrefitte
- Commune
- Coat of arms
- Location of Pierrefitte
- Location within France Location within Nouvelle-Aquitaine
- Coordinates: 46°08′49″N 2°14′01″E
- Country: France
- Region: Nouvelle-Aquitaine
- Department: Creuse
- Arrondissement: Aubusson
- Canton: Gouzon
- Intercommunality: CC Creuse Confluence

Government
  - Mayor (2020–2026): Marie-Hélène Chardin
- Area^{1}: 6.4 km^{2} (2.5 sq mi)
- Elevation: 410 m (1,350 ft)
- Highest elevation: 422 m (1,385 ft)
- Lowest elevation: 380 m (1,250 ft)
- Population (2023): 67
  - Density: 10/km^{2} (27/sq mi)
- Time zone: UTC+01:00 (CET)
  - Summer (DST): UTC+02:00 (CEST)
- INSEE/Postal code: 23152 /23130
- ^{1} French Land Register data, which excludes lakes, ponds, glaciers > 1 km^{2} (0.386 sq mi or 247 acres) and river estuaries.

Pierrefitte (French pronunciation: [pjɛʁfit]; Occitan: Peirafita) is a commune in the Creuse department in the Nouvelle-Aquitaine region in central France.

== Geography ==
A small farming area comprising the village and a couple of hamlets situated by the banks of the Voueize river, some 15 miles (24 km) east of Guéret, at the junction of the D65 and the D55.

== Population ==
Historical population
Year	Pop.	±% p.a.
1968	147	—
1975	119	−2.97%
1982	86	−4.53%
1990	85	−0.15%
1999	95	+1.24%
2007	81	−1.97%
2012	72	−2.33%
2017	70	−0.56%
2023	67	−0.73%
Source: INSEE

== Sights ==
- The church of St. Martin, dating from the twelfth century.

== See also ==
- Communes of the Creuse department
