= Basville =

Commune in Nouvelle-Aquitaine, France

- Commune
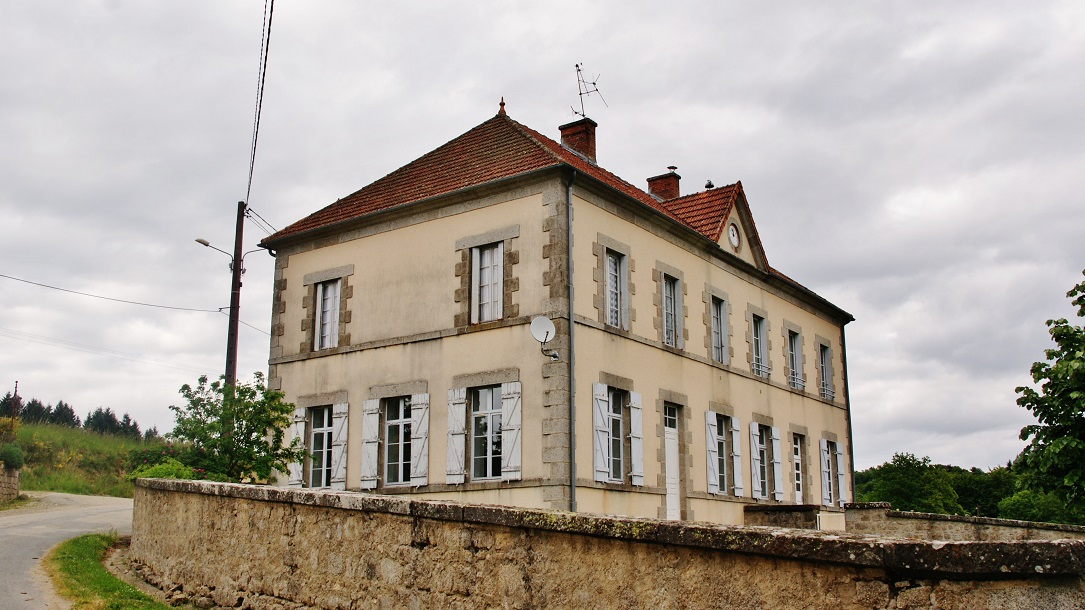
- Town hall
- Location of Basville
- Location within France Location within Nouvelle-Aquitaine
- Coordinates: 45°52′20″N 2°23′52″E
- Country: France
- Region: Nouvelle-Aquitaine
- Department: Creuse
- Arrondissement: Aubusson
- Canton: Auzances
- Intercommunality: CC Marche et Combraille en Aquitaine

Government
  - Mayor (2020–2026): Daniel Ferrier
- Area^{1}: 22.57 km^{2} (8.71 sq mi)
- Elevation: 692 m (2,270 ft)
- Highest elevation: 826 m (2,710 ft)
- Lowest elevation: 675 m (2,215 ft)
- Population (2023): 167
  - Density: 7.40/km^{2} (19.2/sq mi)
- Time zone: UTC+01:00 (CET)
  - Summer (DST): UTC+02:00 (CEST)
- INSEE/Postal code: 23017 /23260
- ^{1} French Land Register data, which excludes lakes, ponds, glaciers > 1 km^{2} (0.386 sq mi or 247 acres) and river estuaries.

Basville (French pronunciation: [bavil]; Occitan: Basvila) is a commune in the Creuse department in the Nouvelle-Aquitaine region in central France.

== Geography ==
An area of forestry, farming and lakes comprising the village and several hamlets situated at the border with the department of Allier, some 12 miles (19 km) southeast of Aubusson at the junction of the D10 and the D16 roads.

The small river Tardes rises in the commune, then flows west through the commune.

The Chavanon (locally called la Ramade) forms part of the commune's southern border.

== Population ==
Historical population
Year	Pop.	±% p.a.
1968	306	—
1975	300	−0.28%
1982	274	−1.29%
1990	224	−2.49%
1999	195	−1.53%
2007	180	−1.00%
2012	175	−0.56%
2017	159	−1.90%
2023	167	+0.82%
Source: INSEE

== Sights ==
- The church of Notre-Dame, dating from the twelfth century.
- Several old watermills.
- A dolmen at the Bois d'Urbe.
- A Roman pottery kiln at la Villatte.
- The Château du Layris.
- The thirteenth century church at Saint-Alvard.

== See also ==
- Communes of the Creuse department
