= La Villetelle =

Commune in Nouvelle-Aquitaine, France

- Commune
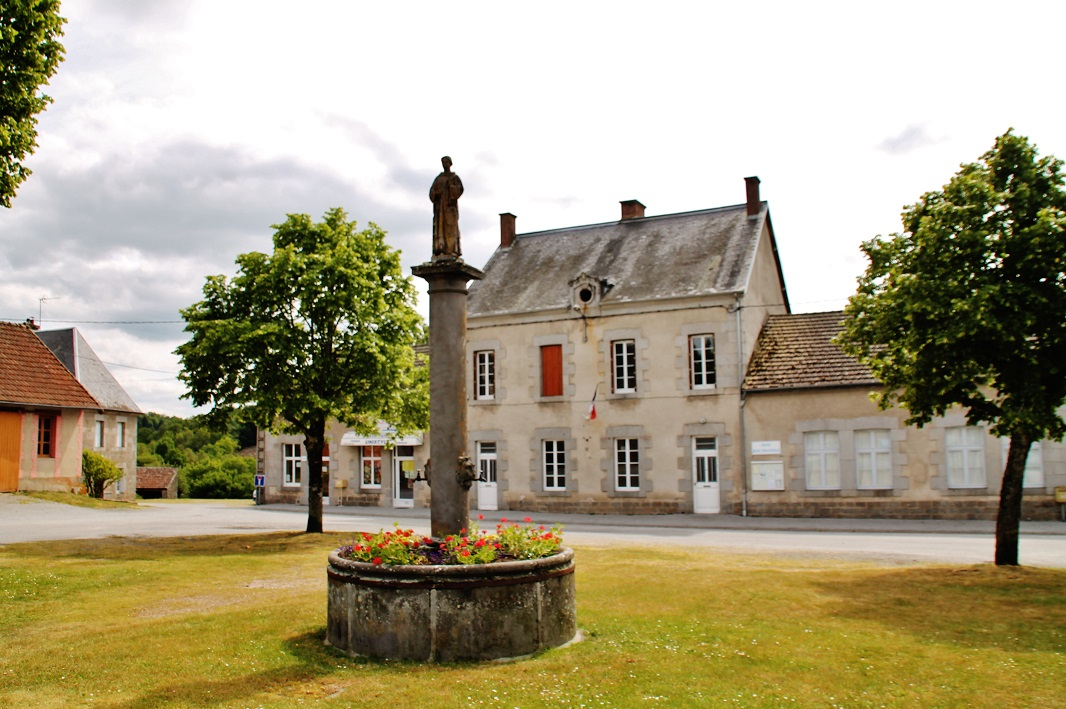
- Town hall
- Location of La Villetelle
- Location within France Location within Nouvelle-Aquitaine
- Coordinates: 45°55′11″N 2°20′30″E
- Country: France
- Region: Nouvelle-Aquitaine
- Department: Creuse
- Arrondissement: Aubusson
- Canton: Auzances
- Intercommunality: CC Creuse Grand Sud

Government
  - Mayor (2020–2026): Jacques Bœuf
- Area^{1}: 16.14 km^{2} (6.23 sq mi)
- Elevation: 650 m (2,130 ft)
- Highest elevation: 727 m (2,385 ft)
- Lowest elevation: 540 m (1,770 ft)
- Population (2023): 163
  - Density: 10.1/km^{2} (26.2/sq mi)
- Time zone: UTC+01:00 (CET)
  - Summer (DST): UTC+02:00 (CEST)
- INSEE/Postal code: 23266 /23260
- ^{1} French Land Register data, which excludes lakes, ponds, glaciers > 1 km^{2} (0.386 sq mi or 247 acres) and river estuaries.

La Villetelle (French pronunciation: [la viltɛl]; Occitan: La Vialatèla) is a commune in the Creuse department in the Nouvelle-Aquitaine region in central France.

== Geography ==
A small farming and forestry village situated some 10 miles (16 km) east of Aubusson, at the junction of the D25, D9 and the D941 road.

The river Tardes forms all of the commune's southwestern border.

== Population ==
Historical population
Year	Pop.	±% p.a.
1968	265	—
1975	224	−2.37%
1982	193	−2.11%
1990	188	−0.33%
1999	171	−1.05%
2007	164	−0.52%
2012	168	+0.48%
2017	169	+0.12%
2023	163	−0.60%
Source: INSEE

== Sights ==
- The nineteenth-century church of St.Laurent.
- A seventeenth-century coaching inn.
- The château de Lavaud-Provins.

== See also ==
- Communes of the Creuse department
