= Voueize =

River in central France

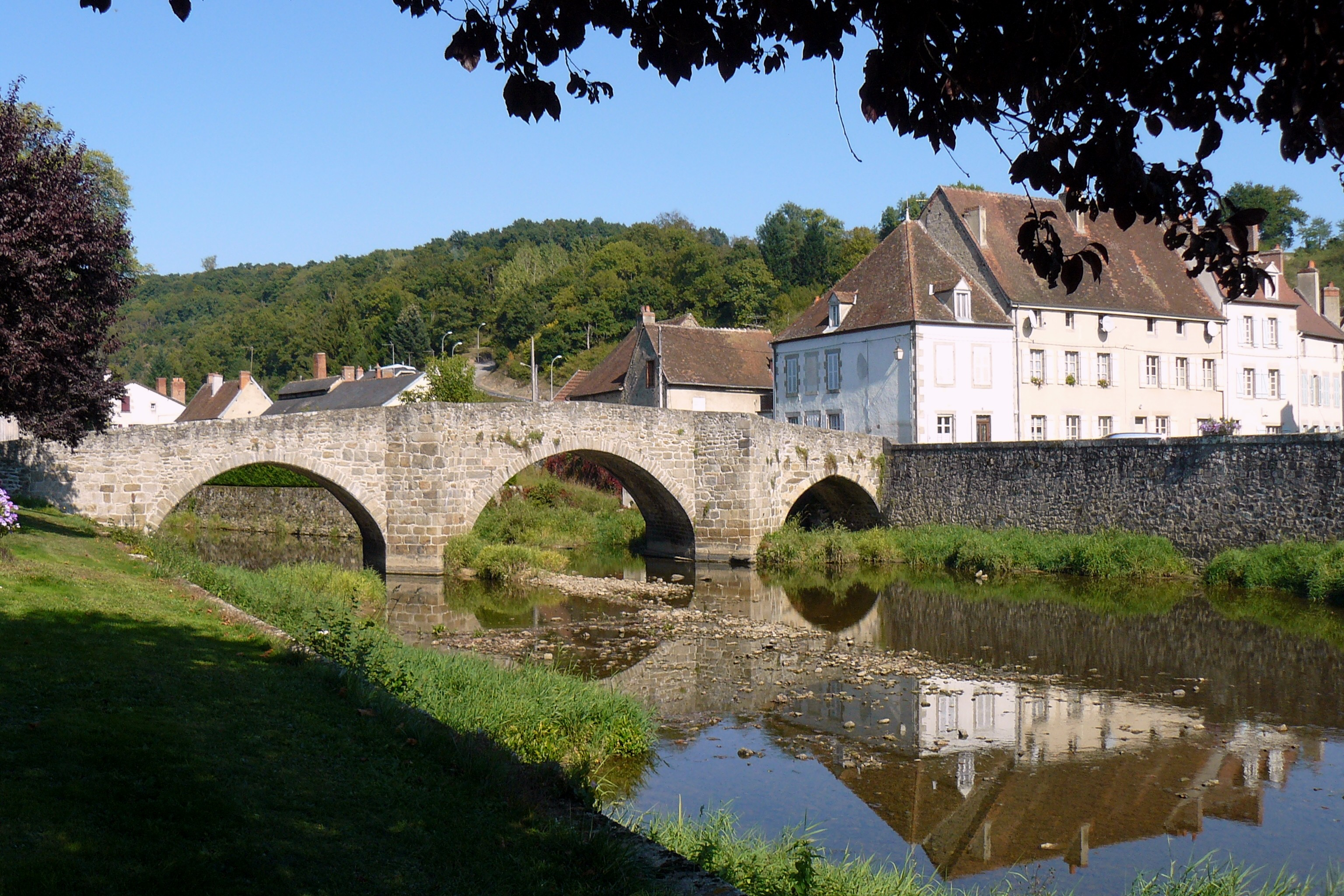
- The Voueize at Chambon-sur-Voueize

- Location within France Location within Nouvelle-Aquitaine

Location
- Country: France

Physical characteristics
- Source
  - location: La Chaussade
  - coordinates: 45°59′25″N 02°14′39″E
  - elevation: 590 m (1,940 ft)
- Mouth
  - location: Tardes
  - coordinates: 46°11′17″N 02°25′18″E
  - elevation: 330 m (1,080 ft)
- Length: 53.6 km (33.3 mi)
- Basin size: 435 km^{2} (168 sq mi)

Basin features
- Progression: Tardes→ Cher→ Loire→ Atlantic Ocean

The Voueize (French pronunciation: [vwɛz]; Occitan: Voeisa) is a 53.6-kilometre-long (33.3 mi) river in the Creuse département, central France. Its source is at La Chaussade. It flows generally northeast. It is a left tributary of the Tardes into which it flows at Chambon-sur-Voueize.

== Communes along its course ==
This list is ordered from source to mouth: La Chaussade, Bosroger, Champagnat, Puy-Malsignat, Peyrat-la-Nonière, Saint-Julien-le-Châtel, Saint-Loup, Pierrefitte, Gouzon, Bord-Saint-Georges, Lussat, Lépaud, Chambon-sur-Voueize
