= Budelière =

Commune in Nouvelle-Aquitaine, France

- Commune
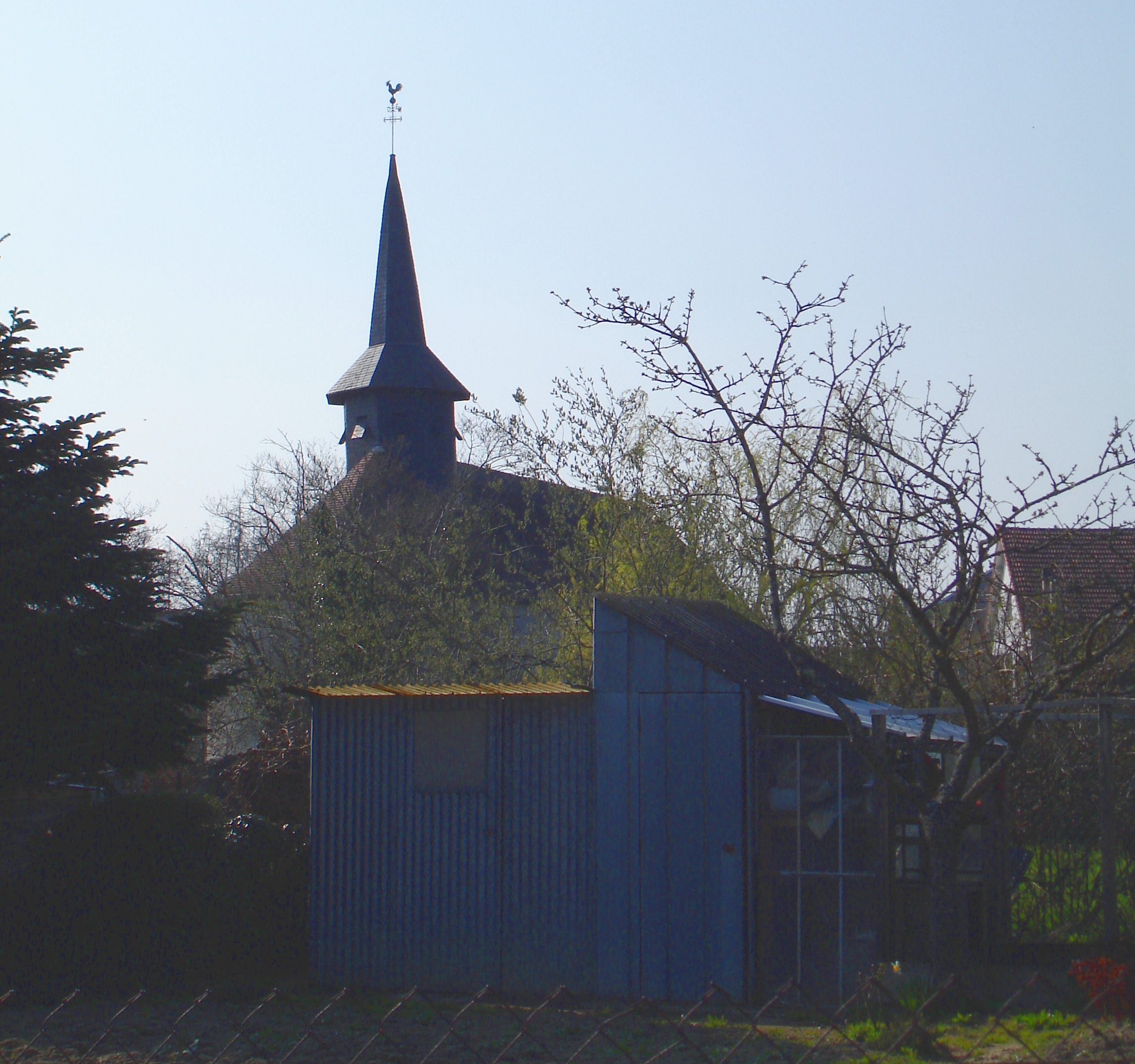
- The church in Budelière
- Location of Budelière
- Location within France Location within Nouvelle-Aquitaine
- Coordinates: 46°13′15″N 2°28′09″E
- Country: France
- Region: Nouvelle-Aquitaine
- Department: Creuse
- Arrondissement: Aubusson
- Canton: Évaux-les-Bains
- Intercommunality: CC Creuse Confluence

Government
  - Mayor (2020–2026): Lionel Couturier
- Area^{1}: 25.07 km^{2} (9.68 sq mi)
- Highest elevation: 449 m (1,473 ft)
- Lowest elevation: 293 m (961 ft)
- Population (2023): 718
  - Density: 28.6/km^{2} (74.2/sq mi)
- Time zone: UTC+01:00 (CET)
  - Summer (DST): UTC+02:00 (CEST)
- INSEE/Postal code: 23035 /23170
- ^{1} French Land Register data, which excludes lakes, ponds, glaciers > 1 km^{2} (0.386 sq mi or 247 acres) and river estuaries.

Budelière (French pronunciation: [byd(ə)ljɛʁ]; Auvergnat: Budeliere) is a commune in the Creuse department in the Nouvelle-Aquitaine region in central France.

== Geography ==
An area of lakes, forestry and farming comprising the village and several hamlets situated some 10 miles (16 km) southwest of Montluçon at the junction of the D993 and the D64 roads.
Between 1905 and 1955, the commune had a goldmine at Le Chatelet, which produced 11 tonnes of gold in those years.
The commune is served by a TER railway.

The river Tardes, classified Natura 2000, forms all of the commune's eastern border, then flows into the Cher, 4 km (2.5 mi) northwest of the village.

== Population ==
Historical population
Year	Pop.	±% p.a.
1968	689	—
1975	623	−1.43%
1982	715	+1.99%
1990	756	+0.70%
1999	755	−0.01%
2007	785	+0.49%
2012	773	−0.31%
2017	717	−1.49%
2023	718	+0.02%
Source: INSEE

== Sights ==
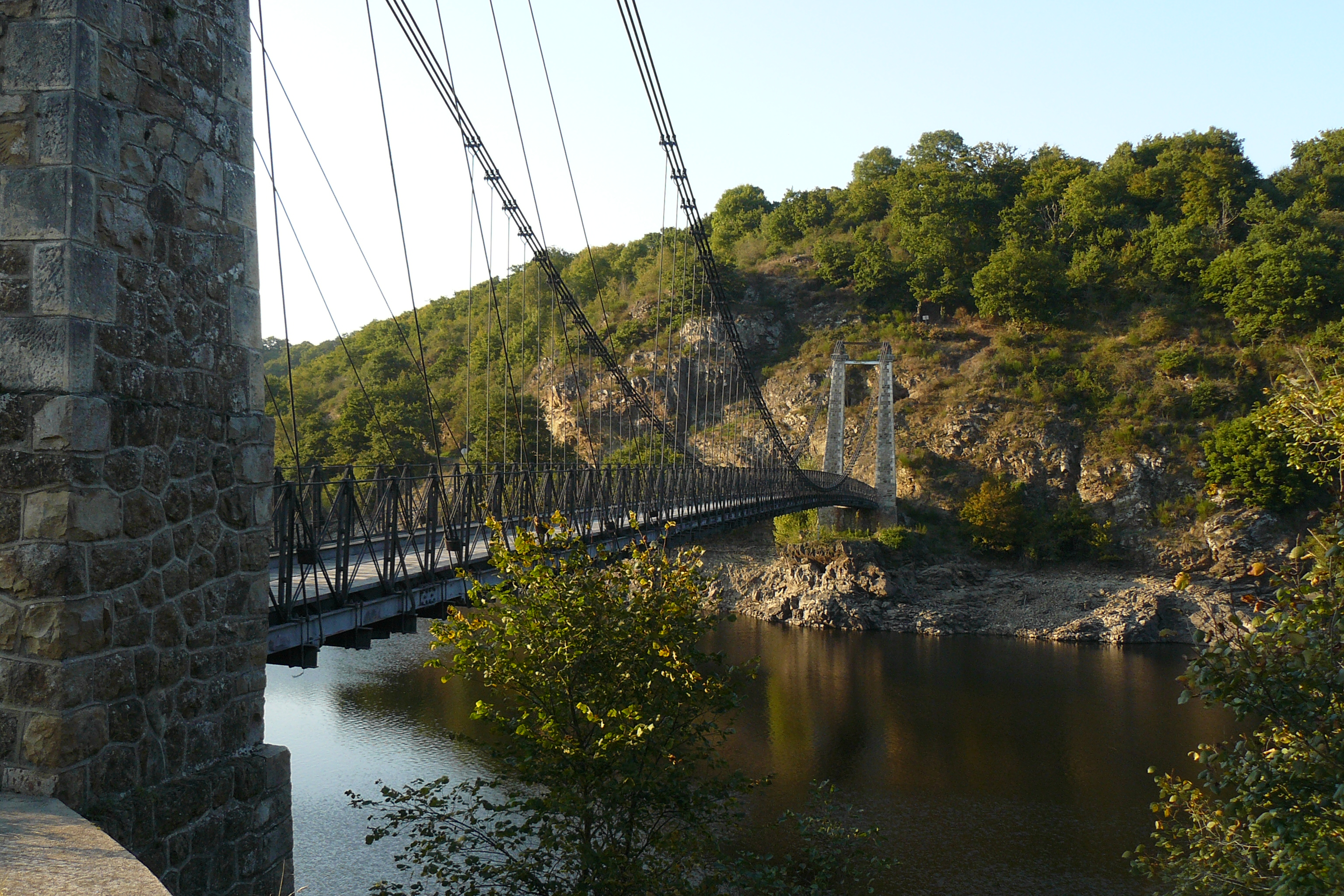
Suspension bridge over the Tardes, between Budelière and Évaux-les-Bains

- The church, dating from the nineteenth century.
- The church at St.Radegonde, dating from the twelfth century.
- The church of St.Martial at Le Châtelet, dating from the twelfth century.
- The château de la Villederie.
- The chapel of Saint-Marien.

== See also ==
- Communes of the Creuse department
