= La Chaussade =

Commune in Nouvelle-Aquitaine, France

- Commune
- Location of La Chaussade
- Location within France Location within Nouvelle-Aquitaine
- Coordinates: 45°59′23″N 2°14′08″E
- Country: France
- Region: Nouvelle-Aquitaine
- Department: Creuse
- Arrondissement: Aubusson
- Canton: Aubusson
- Intercommunality: CC Marche et Combraille en Aquitaine

Government
  - Mayor (2020–2026): Gina Virgoulay
- Area^{1}: 7.19 km^{2} (2.78 sq mi)
- Elevation: 610 m (2,000 ft)
- Highest elevation: 663 m (2,175 ft)
- Lowest elevation: 543 m (1,781 ft)
- Population (2023): 99
  - Density: 14/km^{2} (36/sq mi)
- Time zone: UTC+01:00 (CET)
  - Summer (DST): UTC+02:00 (CEST)
- INSEE/Postal code: 23059 /23200
- ^{1} French Land Register data, which excludes lakes, ponds, glaciers > 1 km^{2} (0.386 sq mi or 247 acres) and river estuaries.

La Chaussade (French pronunciation: [la ʃosad]; Occitan: La Chauçada) is a commune in the Creuse department in the Nouvelle-Aquitaine region in central France.

== Geography ==
A small village of forestry and farming situated just 3 miles (4.8 km) northeast of Aubusson, at the junction of the D40, D39 and the D993.

The Voueize has its source in the commune.

== Population ==
Historical population
Year	Pop.	±% p.a.
1968	123	—
1975	111	−1.46%
1982	108	−0.39%
1990	105	−0.35%
1999	104	−0.11%
2007	114	+1.15%
2012	117	+0.52%
2017	107	−1.77%
2023	99	−1.29%
Source: INSEE

== Sights ==
- The thirteenth century church.
- The three châteaux of Baboneix, Le Rechautier and l'Etang.
- A donjon at Chalard.

== See also ==
- Communes of the Creuse department
