= Saint-Priest, Creuse =

Commune in Nouvelle-Aquitaine, France

Saint-Priest
- Commune
- Location of Saint-Priest
- Location within France Location within Nouvelle-Aquitaine
- Coordinates: 46°05′20″N 2°20′39″E
- Country: France
- Region: Nouvelle-Aquitaine
- Department: Creuse
- Arrondissement: Aubusson
- Canton: Évaux-les-Bains
- Intercommunality: CC Marche et Combraille en Aquitaine

Government
  - Mayor (2020–2026): Jean-Claude Dubsay
- Area^{1}: 22.34 km^{2} (8.63 sq mi)
- Elevation: 450 m (1,480 ft)
- Highest elevation: 585 m (1,919 ft)
- Lowest elevation: 420 m (1,380 ft)
- Population (2023): 149
  - Density: 6.67/km^{2} (17.3/sq mi)
- Time zone: UTC+01:00 (CET)
  - Summer (DST): UTC+02:00 (CEST)
- INSEE/Postal code: 23234 /23110
- ^{1} French Land Register data, which excludes lakes, ponds, glaciers > 1 km^{2} (0.386 sq mi or 247 acres) and river estuaries.

Saint-Priest (French pronunciation: [sɛ̃ pʁi(jɛst)]; Occitan: Sent Priech) is a commune in the Creuse department in central France.

== Geography ==
The river Tardes forms most of the commune's western border.

== Population ==
Historical population
Year	Pop.	±% p.a.
1968	351	—
1975	311	−1.71%
1982	258	−2.63%
1990	230	−1.43%
1999	192	−1.99%
2007	175	−1.15%
2012	160	−1.78%
2017	165	+0.62%
2023	149	−1.69%
Source: INSEE

== See also ==
- Communes of the Creuse department
