= Royère-de-Vassivière =

Commune in Nouvelle-Aquitaine, France

- Commune
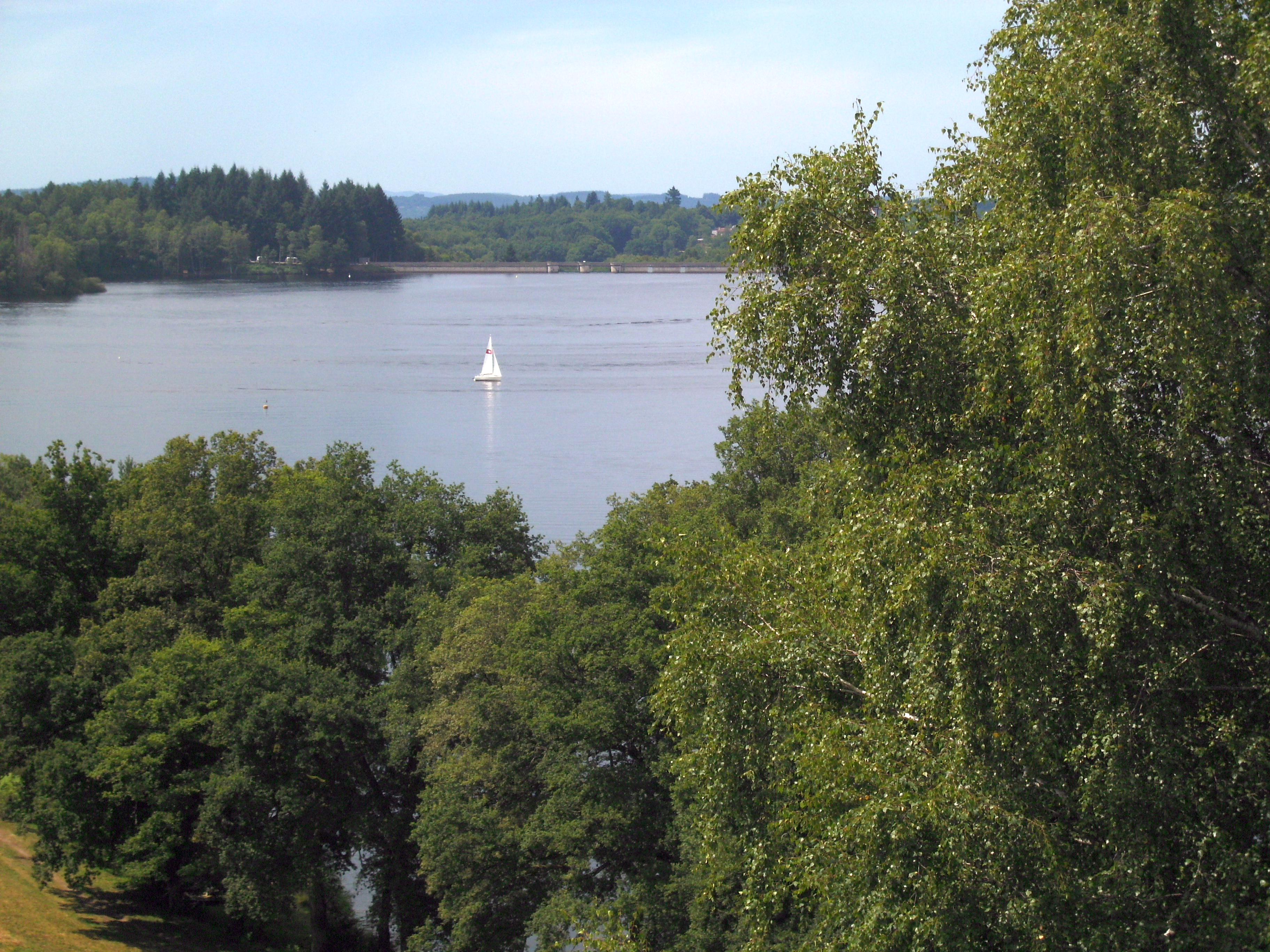
- Vassivière Lake

- Coat of arms
- Location of Royère-de-Vassivière
- Location within France Location within Nouvelle-Aquitaine
- Coordinates: 45°50′31″N 1°54′43″E
- Country: France
- Region: Nouvelle-Aquitaine
- Department: Creuse
- Arrondissement: Guéret
- Canton: Felletin
- Intercommunality: CC Creuse Sud Ouest

Government
  - Mayor (2020–2026): Raymond Rabeteau
- Area^{1}: 74.14 km^{2} (28.63 sq mi)
- Highest elevation: 829 m (2,720 ft)
- Lowest elevation: 540 m (1,770 ft)
- Population (2023): 565
  - Density: 7.62/km^{2} (19.7/sq mi)
- Time zone: UTC+01:00 (CET)
  - Summer (DST): UTC+02:00 (CEST)
- INSEE/Postal code: 23165 /23460
- ^{1} French Land Register data, which excludes lakes, ponds, glaciers > 1 km^{2} (0.386 sq mi or 247 acres) and river estuaries.

Royère-de-Vassivière (French pronunciation: [ʁwajɛʁ də vasivjɛʁ], literally Royère of Vassivière; Occitan: Roièra de Vacivièra) is a commune in the Creuse department in the Nouvelle-Aquitaine region in central France.

== Geography ==
A large area of forestry, farming and lakes comprising the village and several hamlets situated some 17 miles (27 km) south of Aubusson on the D3, D7, D8 and the D59 roads. The rivers Maulde and Thaurion rise within the borders of the commune. The commune lies within the regional park of the Millevaches, an area of the 1000 sources, not cows.

== Population ==
Historical population
Year	Pop.	±% p.a.
1968	771	—
1975	744	−0.51%
1982	782	+0.71%
1990	670	−1.91%
1999	636	−0.58%
2007	568	−1.40%
2012	628	+2.03%
2017	575	−1.75%
2023	565	−0.29%
Source: INSEE

== Sights ==
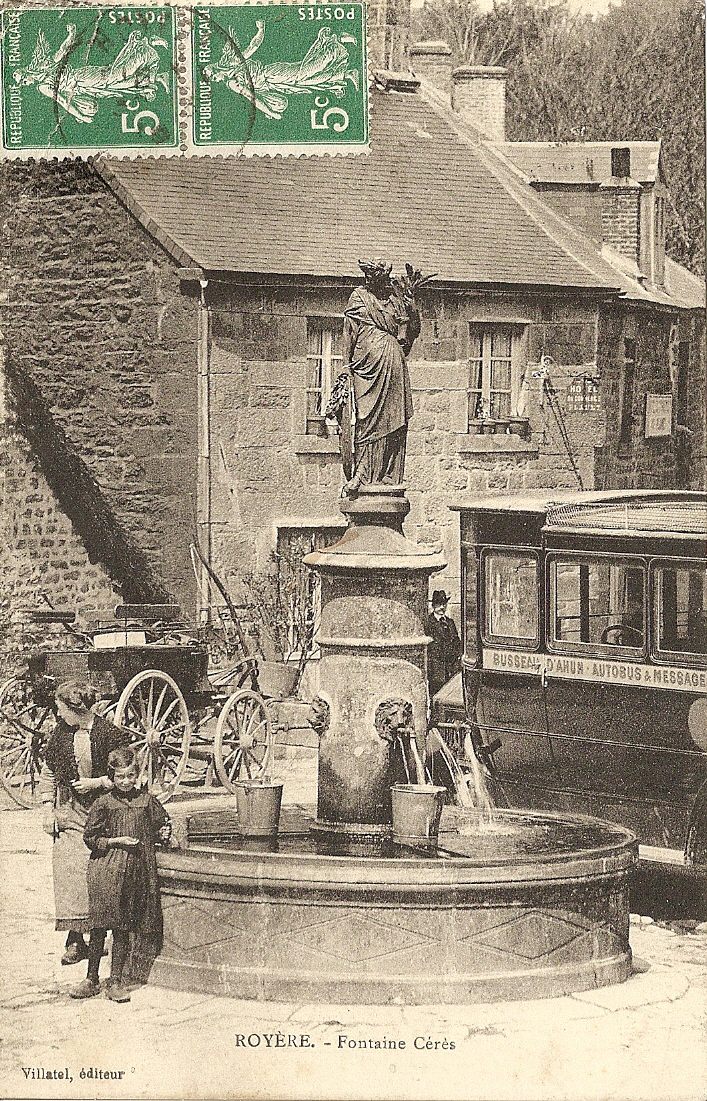
The Ceres fountain in 1919

- The church of St. Germain, dating from the thirteenth century.
- The Ceres fountain, opposite the church.
- The Lac de Vassiviere.
- The Lac de Lavaud-Gelade.
- The Modern Art Centre on the l'île de Vassivière.
- The Sculpture Park: 30 monumental sculptures by French and overseas artists.

== See also ==
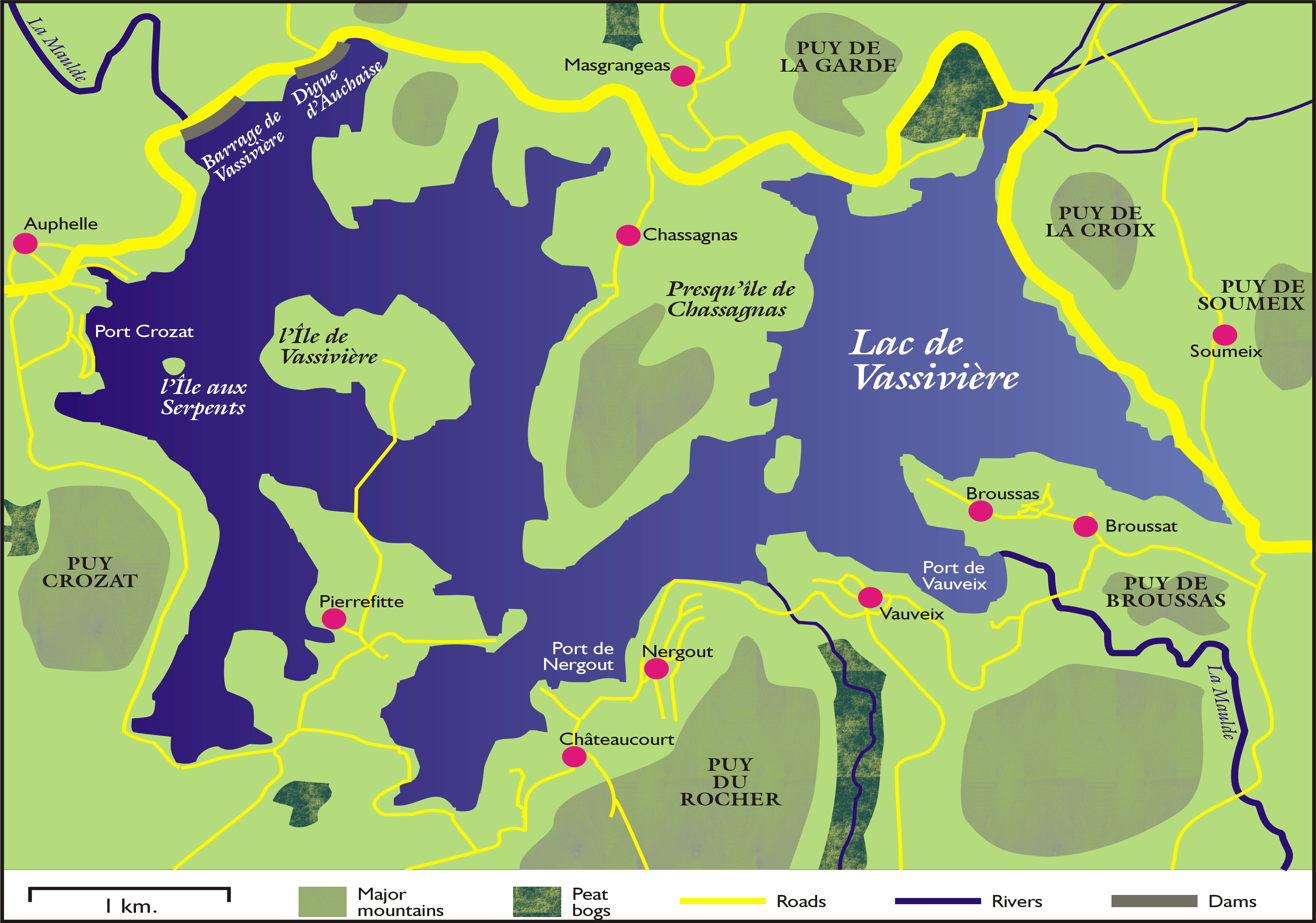
Location of the lake of Vassivere

- Communes of the Creuse department
