= Évaux-les-Bains =

Commune in Nouvelle-Aquitaine, France

- Commune
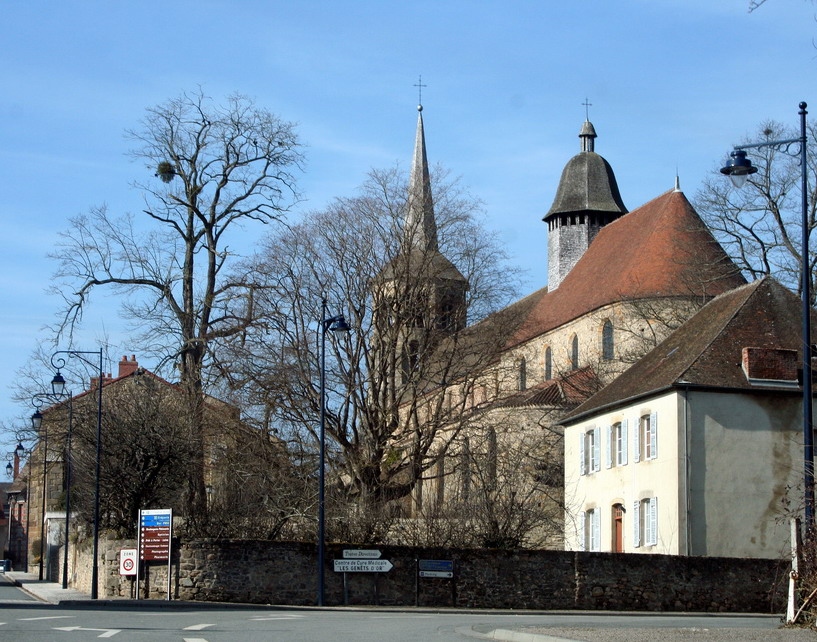
- The church of Évaux-les-Bains and the presbytery

- Coat of arms
- Location of Évaux-les-Bains
- Location within France Location within Nouvelle-Aquitaine
- Coordinates: 46°10′33″N 2°29′13″E
- Country: France
- Region: Nouvelle-Aquitaine
- Department: Creuse
- Arrondissement: Aubusson
- Canton: Évaux-les-Bains
- Intercommunality: CC Creuse Confluence

Government
  - Mayor (2020–2026): Bruno Papineau
- Area^{1}: 45.55 km^{2} (17.59 sq mi)
- Highest elevation: 560 m (1,840 ft)
- Lowest elevation: 292 m (958 ft)
- Population (2023): 1,277
  - Density: 28.04/km^{2} (72.61/sq mi)
- Time zone: UTC+01:00 (CET)
  - Summer (DST): UTC+02:00 (CEST)
- INSEE/Postal code: 23076 /23110
- ^{1} French Land Register data, which excludes lakes, ponds, glaciers > 1 km^{2} (0.386 sq mi or 247 acres) and river estuaries.

Évaux-les-Bains (French pronunciation: [evo le bɛ̃]; Occitan: Evahon) is a commune in the Creuse department in the Nouvelle-Aquitaine region in central France.

== History ==
A spa town founded by the Romans in the first century, who developed thermal baths and called the place “Ivaonum,” possibly after a deity, Ivaos. It became a place of pilgrimage after the sixth century, because of the tomb of the Christian hermit Marien.

A monastery was built here in the tenth century, but this was destroyed in the seventeenth century. It was the regional capital of the Combraille in the thirteenth century and was besieged during the Hundred Years War by the Routiers.

The Roman baths, abandoned since the fifth century, became popular again at the beginning of the 17th century and again in the nineteenth century. The town had a population of 2,698 by 1841.

== Geography ==
An area of lakes and streams, forestry, farming and associated light industry, consisting of a small town and several hamlets situated between the valleys of the rivers Cher and Tardes, some 14 miles (23 km) southwest of Montluçon, at the junction of the D19, D20, D996 and the D915 roads. The commune is on the border with the department of Allier and is served by a TER railway link to Montluçon.

The river Tardes flows into the Cher in the commune, 7.5 km (4.7 mi) north of the town.

== Population ==
Historical population
Year	Pop.	±% p.a.
1968	1,822	—
1975	1,727	−0.76%
1982	1,810	+0.67%
1990	1,716	−0.66%
1999	1,545	−1.16%
2007	1,546	+0.01%
2012	1,415	−1.76%
2017	1,390	−0.36%
2023	1,277	−1.40%
Source: INSEE

== Sights ==
- The church of St. Peter & Paul, dating from the eleventh century.
- The seventeenth century châteaux of Relibert and Monterolle.
- The church of Notre-Dame.
- Remains of an old convent.
- The chapel of Saint Marien.
- Vestiges of the town gates and walls.
- Châteaux de Relibert, Monterolle.
- Vestiges of the Roman baths.
- The Tardes viaduct, by Gustave Eiffel.
- The war memorial.
- The eleventh-century chapel of Saint Radegonde.
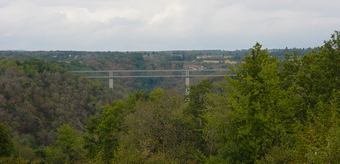
Viaduct over the Tardes

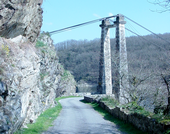
A suspension bridge

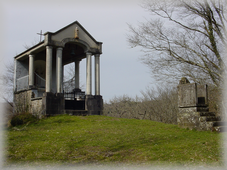
Saint Marien's hermitage

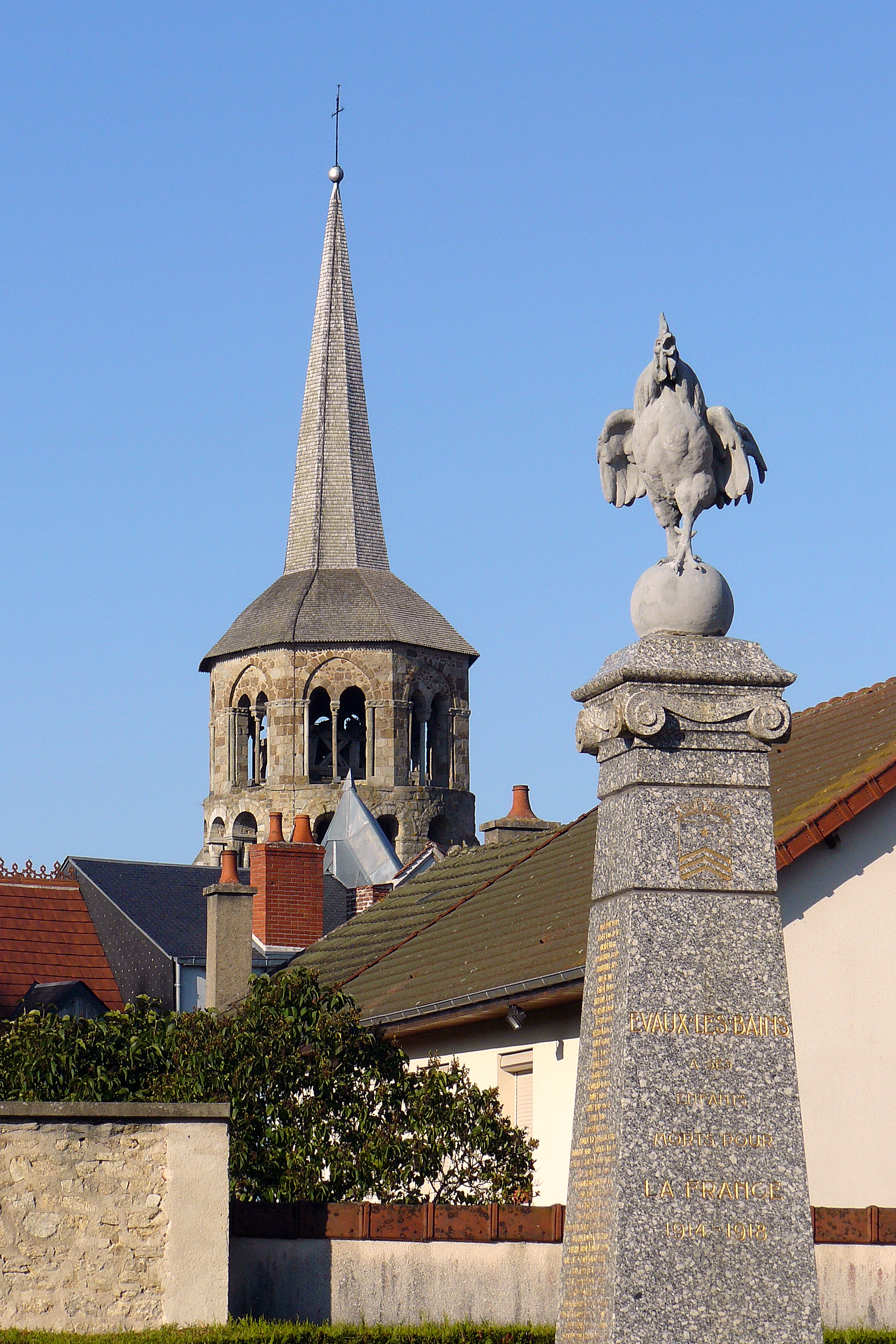
Church steeple

== See also ==
- Communes of the Creuse department
