= Champagnat, Creuse =

Commune in Nouvelle-Aquitaine, France

Champagnat
- Commune
- Location of Champagnat
- Location within France Location within Nouvelle-Aquitaine
- Coordinates: 46°01′10″N 2°17′03″E
- Country: France
- Region: Nouvelle-Aquitaine
- Department: Creuse
- Arrondissement: Aubusson
- Canton: Aubusson
- Intercommunality: CC Marche et Combraille en Aquitaine

Government
  - Mayor (2020–2026): Christian Échevarne
- Area^{1}: 28.82 km^{2} (11.13 sq mi)
- Elevation: 546 m (1,791 ft)
- Highest elevation: 663 m (2,175 ft)
- Lowest elevation: 436 m (1,430 ft)
- Population (2023): 461
  - Density: 16.0/km^{2} (41.4/sq mi)
- Time zone: UTC+01:00 (CET)
  - Summer (DST): UTC+02:00 (CEST)
- INSEE/Postal code: 23048 /23190
- ^{1} French Land Register data, which excludes lakes, ponds, glaciers > 1 km^{2} (0.386 sq mi or 247 acres) and river estuaries.

Champagnat (French pronunciation: [ʃɑ̃paɲa]; Occitan: Champanhac) is a commune in the Creuse department in the Nouvelle-Aquitaine region in central France.

== Geography ==
An area of lakes, forestry and farming comprising the village and several hamlets, situated some 6 miles (9.7 km) northeast of Aubusson at the junctions of the D40, D9, D19, D24 and the D993 roads.

The river Tardes flows northward through the eastern part of the commune.

The Voueize forms part of the commune's western border.

== Population ==
Historical population
Year	Pop.	±% p.a.
1968	604	—
1975	494	−2.83%
1982	482	−0.35%
1990	438	−1.19%
1999	423	−0.39%
2007	417	−0.18%
2012	449	+1.49%
2017	467	+0.79%
2023	461	−0.22%
Source: INSEE

== Sights ==
- A menhir.
- The church of St. Martial, dating from the thirteenth century.
- The medieval castle of Champagnat.
- The fourteenth-century castle de Peyrudette.
- The château de Fournoux.
- A fifteenth-century chapel at Peyrudette.

== Personalities ==
- François Denhaut (1877–1952), an early French aviator & engineer, was born here.

== See also ==
- Communes of the Creuse department
