= Saint-Loup, Creuse =

Commune in Nouvelle-Aquitaine, France

Saint-Loup
- Commune
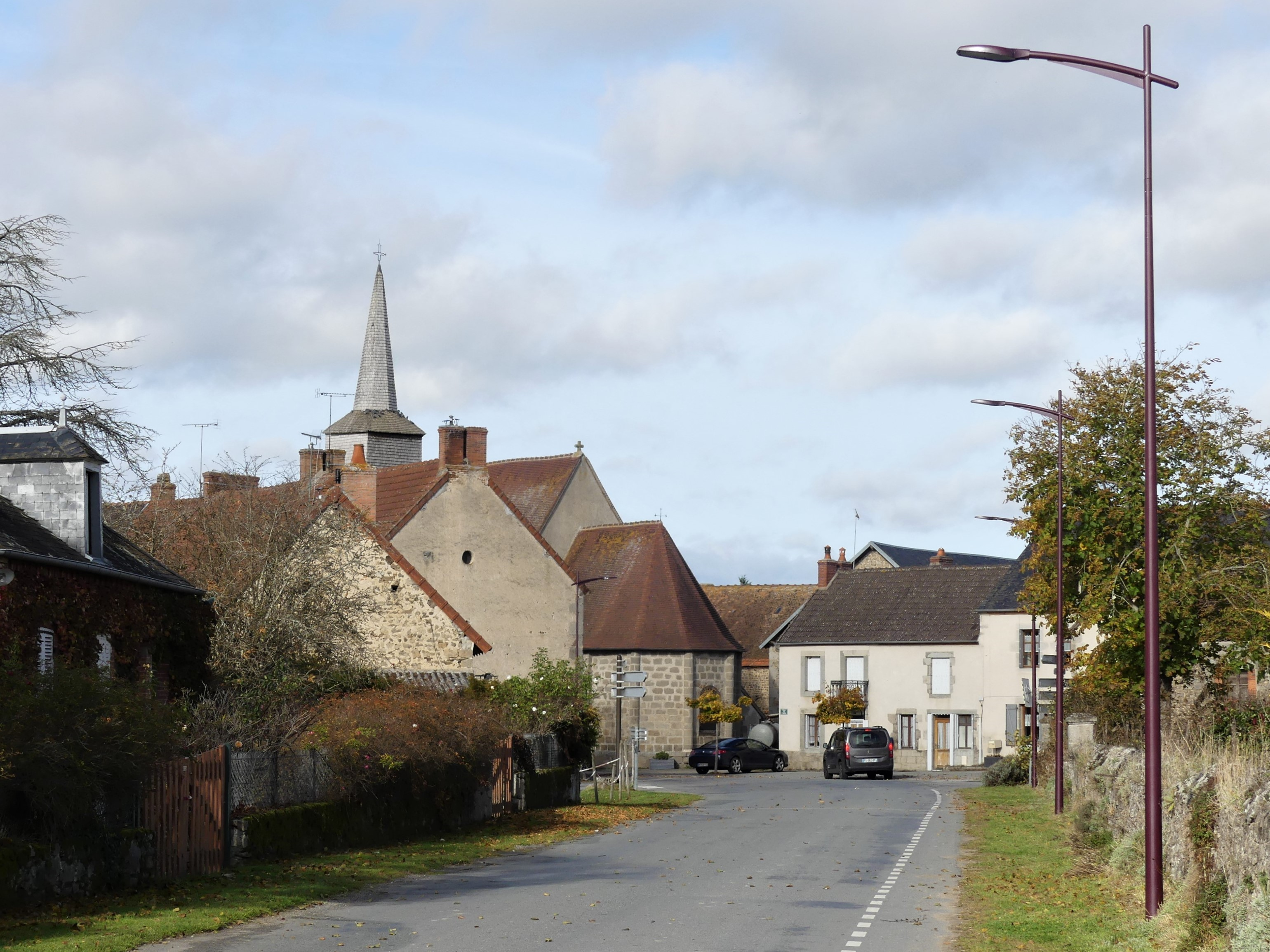
- The village of Saint-Loup, viewed from the southeast
- Location of Saint-Loup
- Location within France Location within Nouvelle-Aquitaine
- Coordinates: 46°08′15″N 2°16′16″E
- Country: France
- Region: Nouvelle-Aquitaine
- Department: Creuse
- Arrondissement: Aubusson
- Canton: Gouzon
- Intercommunality: CC Creuse Confluence

Government
  - Mayor (2020–2026): Anne Bridoux
- Area^{1}: 18.82 km^{2} (7.27 sq mi)
- Elevation: 430 m (1,410 ft)
- Highest elevation: 462 m (1,516 ft)
- Lowest elevation: 383 m (1,257 ft)
- Population (2023): 201
  - Density: 10.7/km^{2} (27.7/sq mi)
- Time zone: UTC+01:00 (CET)
  - Summer (DST): UTC+02:00 (CEST)
- INSEE/Postal code: 23209 /23130
- ^{1} French Land Register data, which excludes lakes, ponds, glaciers > 1 km^{2} (0.386 sq mi or 247 acres) and river estuaries.

Saint-Loup (French pronunciation: [sɛ̃ lu]; Occitan: Sent Lop) is a commune in the Creuse department in central France.

== Geography ==
The Voueize forms part of the commune's western border.

== Population ==
Historical population
Year	Pop.	±% p.a.
1968	310	—
1975	250	−3.03%
1982	234	−0.94%
1990	186	−2.83%
1999	175	−0.68%
2007	177	+0.14%
2012	179	+0.22%
2017	182	+0.33%
2023	201	+1.67%
Source: INSEE

== See also ==
- Communes of the Creuse department
