= Saint-Julien-la-Genête =

Commune in Nouvelle-Aquitaine, France

- Commune
- Location of Saint-Julien-la-Genête
- Location within France Location within Nouvelle-Aquitaine
- Coordinates: 46°09′11″N 2°28′28″E
- Country: France
- Region: Nouvelle-Aquitaine
- Department: Creuse
- Arrondissement: Aubusson
- Canton: Évaux-les-Bains
- Intercommunality: CC Creuse Confluence

Government
  - Mayor (2020–2026): Joël Rougeron
- Area^{1}: 11.91 km^{2} (4.60 sq mi)
- Elevation: 470 m (1,540 ft)
- Highest elevation: 522 m (1,713 ft)
- Lowest elevation: 415 m (1,362 ft)
- Population (2023): 215
  - Density: 18.1/km^{2} (46.8/sq mi)
- Time zone: UTC+01:00 (CET)
  - Summer (DST): UTC+02:00 (CEST)
- INSEE/Postal code: 23203 /23110
- ^{1} French Land Register data, which excludes lakes, ponds, glaciers > 1 km^{2} (0.386 sq mi or 247 acres) and river estuaries.

Saint-Julien-la-Genête (Auvergnat: Sent Julian la Genesta) is a commune in the Creuse department in central France.

== Population ==
Historical population
Year	Pop.	±% p.a.
1968	262	—
1975	216	−2.72%
1982	186	−2.11%
1990	211	+1.59%
1999	213	+0.10%
2007	237	+1.34%
2012	238	+0.08%
2017	223	−1.29%
2023	215	−0.61%
Source: INSEE

== See also ==
- Communes of the Creuse department
