= Saint-Julien-le-Châtel =

Commune in Nouvelle-Aquitaine, France

- Commune
- Coat of arms
- Location of Saint-Julien-le-Châtel
- Location within France Location within Nouvelle-Aquitaine
- Coordinates: 46°07′08″N 2°16′12″E
- Country: France
- Region: Nouvelle-Aquitaine
- Department: Creuse
- Arrondissement: Aubusson
- Canton: Gouzon
- Intercommunality: CC Creuse Confluence

Government
  - Mayor (2020–2026): Catherine Roby
- Area^{1}: 15.3 km^{2} (5.9 sq mi)
- Elevation: 420 m (1,380 ft)
- Highest elevation: 482 m (1,581 ft)
- Lowest elevation: 397 m (1,302 ft)
- Population (2023): 158
  - Density: 10.3/km^{2} (26.7/sq mi)
- Time zone: UTC+01:00 (CET)
  - Summer (DST): UTC+02:00 (CEST)
- INSEE/Postal code: 23204 /23130
- ^{1} French Land Register data, which excludes lakes, ponds, glaciers > 1 km^{2} (0.386 sq mi or 247 acres) and river estuaries.

Saint-Julien-le-Châtel (French pronunciation: [sɛ̃ ʒyljɛ̃ lə ʃatɛl]; Occitan: Sent Julian lo Chastel) is a commune in the Creuse department in central France.

== Geography ==
The river Tardes forms part of the commune's eastern border. The Voueize flows north through the western part of the commune.

== Population ==
Historical population
Year	Pop.	±% p.a.
1968	279	—
1975	246	−1.78%
1982	190	−3.62%
1990	174	−1.09%
1999	172	−0.13%
2007	168	−0.29%
2012	159	−1.10%
2017	143	−2.10%
2023	158	+1.68%
Source: INSEE

== See also ==
- Communes of the Creuse department
