= Bosroger =

Commune in Nouvelle-Aquitaine, France

- Commune
- Location of Bosroger
- Location within France Location within Nouvelle-Aquitaine
- Coordinates: 45°59′42″N 2°15′03″E
- Country: France
- Region: Nouvelle-Aquitaine
- Department: Creuse
- Arrondissement: Aubusson
- Canton: Aubusson
- Intercommunality: CC Marche et Combraille en Aquitaine

Government
  - Mayor (2020–2026): Jean-Paul Joulot
- Area^{1}: 7.56 km^{2} (2.92 sq mi)
- Elevation: 625 m (2,051 ft)
- Highest elevation: 663 m (2,175 ft)
- Lowest elevation: 515 m (1,690 ft)
- Population (2023): 118
  - Density: 15.6/km^{2} (40.4/sq mi)
- Time zone: UTC+01:00 (CET)
  - Summer (DST): UTC+02:00 (CEST)
- INSEE/Postal code: 23028 /23200
- ^{1} French Land Register data, which excludes lakes, ponds, glaciers > 1 km^{2} (0.386 sq mi or 247 acres) and river estuaries.

Bosroger (French pronunciation: [boʁɔʒe]; Occitan: Bòsc Rogier) is a commune in the Creuse department in the Nouvelle-Aquitaine region in central France.

== Geography ==
An area of lakes, forestry and farming comprising a small village and one hamlet situated just 5 miles (8.0 km) northeast of Aubusson, at the junction of the D39, D40 and the D993 roads.

The Voueize flows northward through the western part of the commune.

== Population ==
Historical population
Year	Pop.	±% p.a.
1968	114	—
1975	101	−1.71%
1982	98	−0.43%
1990	80	−2.50%
1999	76	−0.57%
2007	96	+2.96%
2012	119	+4.39%
2017	110	−1.56%
2023	118	+1.18%
Source: INSEE

== Sights ==
- The church, dating from the thirteenth century.
- The chapel at Léon-le-Franc, dating from the fifteenth century.

== See also ==
- Communes of the Creuse department
