= Saint-Silvain-Bellegarde =

Commune in Nouvelle-Aquitaine, France

- Commune
- Location of Saint-Silvain-Bellegarde
- Location within France Location within Nouvelle-Aquitaine
- Coordinates: 45°58′24″N 2°18′14″E
- Country: France
- Region: Nouvelle-Aquitaine
- Department: Creuse
- Arrondissement: Aubusson
- Canton: Aubusson
- Intercommunality: CC Marche et Combraille en Aquitaine

Government
  - Mayor (2020–2026): Alain Bujadoux
- Area^{1}: 20.85 km^{2} (8.05 sq mi)
- Elevation: 550 m (1,800 ft)
- Highest elevation: 648 m (2,126 ft)
- Lowest elevation: 475 m (1,558 ft)
- Population (2023): 189
  - Density: 9.06/km^{2} (23.5/sq mi)
- Time zone: UTC+01:00 (CET)
  - Summer (DST): UTC+02:00 (CEST)
- INSEE/Postal code: 23241 /23190
- ^{1} French Land Register data, which excludes lakes, ponds, glaciers > 1 km^{2} (0.386 sq mi or 247 acres) and river estuaries.

Saint-Silvain-Bellegarde (French pronunciation: [sɛ̃ silvɛ̃ bɛlɡaʁd]; Occitan: Sent Sauve de Bèlagarda) is a commune in the Creuse department in central France.

== Geography ==
The river Tardes flows northeast through the commune.

== Population ==
Historical population
Year	Pop.	±% p.a.
1968	374	—
1975	307	−2.78%
1982	248	−3.00%
1990	238	−0.51%
1999	216	−1.07%
2007	220	+0.23%
2012	195	−2.38%
2017	211	+1.59%
2023	189	−1.82%
Source: INSEE

== See also ==
- Communes of the Creuse department
