= Lupersat =

Commune in Nouvelle-Aquitaine, France

- Commune
- Location of Lupersat
- Location within France Location within Nouvelle-Aquitaine
- Coordinates: 45°59′10″N 2°21′24″E
- Country: France
- Region: Nouvelle-Aquitaine
- Department: Creuse
- Arrondissement: Aubusson
- Canton: Aubusson
- Intercommunality: CC Marche et Combraille en Aquitaine

Government
  - Mayor (2020–2026): Jean-Michel Soulebot
- Area^{1}: 32.64 km^{2} (12.60 sq mi)
- Elevation: 580 m (1,900 ft)
- Highest elevation: 706 m (2,316 ft)
- Lowest elevation: 461 m (1,512 ft)
- Population (2023): 288
  - Density: 8.82/km^{2} (22.9/sq mi)
- Time zone: UTC+01:00 (CET)
  - Summer (DST): UTC+02:00 (CEST)
- INSEE/Postal code: 23113 /23190
- ^{1} French Land Register data, which excludes lakes, ponds, glaciers > 1 km^{2} (0.386 sq mi or 247 acres) and river estuaries.

Lupersat (French pronunciation: [lypɛʁsa]; Occitan: Luperçac) is a commune in the Creuse department in the Nouvelle-Aquitaine region in central France.

== Geography ==
A large area of farming, lakes and forestry comprising a small village and several hamlets situated in the Tardes river valley, some 10 miles (16 km) northeast of Aubusson, at the junction of the D38 and the D988 roads.

== Population ==
Historical population
Year	Pop.	±% p.a.
1968	505	—
1975	413	−2.83%
1982	401	−0.42%
1990	375	−0.83%
1999	354	−0.64%
2007	331	−0.84%
2012	330	−0.06%
2017	302	−1.76%
2023	288	−0.79%
Source: INSEE

== Sights ==
- The church, dating from the twelfth century.
- A sixteenth-century presbytery.
- A fourteenth-century house at La Chezotte.
- The remains of a fifteenth-century château at Lavaux-Graton.
- A chapel with a tower, at Monteil-Sugnet

== See also ==
- Communes of the Creuse department
