= Lussat, Creuse =

Commune in Nouvelle-Aquitaine, France

Lussat
- Commune
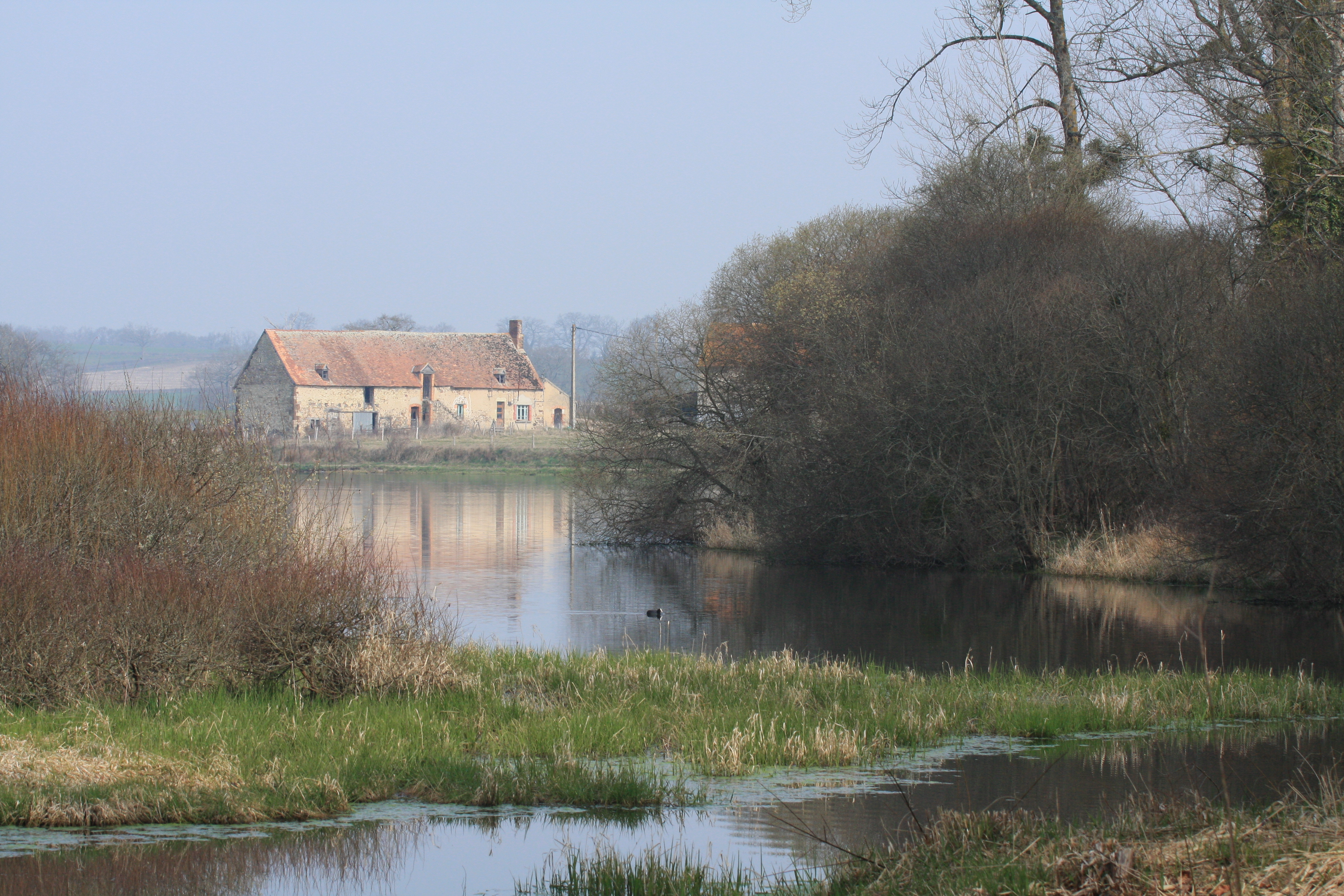
- Nature reserve pond of Landes

- Coat of arms
- Location of Lussat
- Location within France Location within Nouvelle-Aquitaine
- Coordinates: 46°11′01″N 2°20′33″E
- Country: France
- Region: Nouvelle-Aquitaine
- Department: Creuse
- Arrondissement: Aubusson
- Canton: Évaux-les-Bains
- Intercommunality: CC Creuse Confluence

Government
  - Mayor (2020–2026): Daniel Malleret
- Area^{1}: 46.86 km^{2} (18.09 sq mi)
- Elevation: 443 m (1,453 ft)
- Highest elevation: 453 m (1,486 ft)
- Lowest elevation: 351 m (1,152 ft)
- Population (2023): 416
  - Density: 8.88/km^{2} (23.0/sq mi)
- Time zone: UTC+01:00 (CET)
  - Summer (DST): UTC+02:00 (CEST)
- INSEE/Postal code: 23114 /23170
- ^{1} French Land Register data, which excludes lakes, ponds, glaciers > 1 km^{2} (0.386 sq mi or 247 acres) and river estuaries.

Lussat (French pronunciation: [lysa]; Occitan: Luçac) is a commune in the Creuse department in the Nouvelle-Aquitaine region in central France.

== Geography ==
A large area of farming, lakes and streams, comprising the village and several hamlets situated some 20 miles (32 km) northeast of Aubusson, at the junction of the D55 and the D915 roads and also on the D993.

The river Voueize, a tributary of the Tardes, flows eastward through the northern part of the commune. The Tardes forms most of the commune's eastern border.

== Population ==
Historical population
Year	Pop.	±% p.a.
1968	631	—
1975	525	−2.59%
1982	520	−0.14%
1990	486	−0.84%
1999	428	−1.40%
2007	446	+0.52%
2012	454	+0.36%
2017	426	−1.27%
2023	416	−0.40%
Source: INSEE

== Sights ==
- The church, dating from the nineteenth century.
- The remains of a feudal castle, now a house.
- The Landes lake nature reserve.

== See also ==
- Communes of the Creuse department
