= Lépaud =

Commune in Nouvelle-Aquitaine, France

- Commune
- Location of Lépaud
- Location within France Location within Nouvelle-Aquitaine
- Coordinates: 46°14′24″N 2°23′17″E
- Country: France
- Region: Nouvelle-Aquitaine
- Department: Creuse
- Arrondissement: Aubusson
- Canton: Évaux-les-Bains
- Intercommunality: CC Creuse Confluence

Government
  - Mayor (2020–2026): Pierre Morlon
- Area^{1}: 24.12 km^{2} (9.31 sq mi)
- Highest elevation: 457 m (1,499 ft)
- Lowest elevation: 350 m (1,150 ft)
- Population (2023): 359
  - Density: 14.9/km^{2} (38.5/sq mi)
- Time zone: UTC+01:00 (CET)
  - Summer (DST): UTC+02:00 (CEST)
- INSEE/Postal code: 23106 /23170
- ^{1} French Land Register data, which excludes lakes, ponds, glaciers > 1 km^{2} (0.386 sq mi or 247 acres) and river estuaries.

Lépaud (French pronunciation: [lepo]; Occitan: L'Espaud) is a commune in the Creuse department in the Nouvelle-Aquitaine region in central France.

== Geography ==
An area of farming, lakes and streams, comprising the village and several hamlets situated in the Voueize river valley, some 21 miles (34 km) northeast of Aubusson, at the junction of the D14 and the D917 roads. The Montluçon - Guéret Airport is entirely within the commune's borders.

== Population ==
Historical population
Year	Pop.	±% p.a.
1968	459	—
1975	427	−1.03%
1982	368	−2.10%
1990	344	−0.84%
1999	342	−0.06%
2007	364	+0.78%
2012	385	+1.13%
2017	363	−1.17%
2023	359	−0.18%
Source: INSEE

== Sights ==
- The church, dating from the thirteenth century.
- The remains of a fifteenth-century castle.

== See also ==
- Communes of the Creuse department
