= Auge, Creuse =

Commune in Nouvelle-Aquitaine, France

Auge
- Commune
- Location of Auge
- Location within France Location within Nouvelle-Aquitaine
- Coordinates: 46°14′34″N 2°19′28″E
- Country: France
- Region: Nouvelle-Aquitaine
- Department: Creuse
- Arrondissement: Aubusson
- Canton: Évaux-les-Bains
- Intercommunality: CC Creuse Confluence

Government
  - Mayor (2020–2026): Patrick Maume
- Area^{1}: 9.97 km^{2} (3.85 sq mi)
- Highest elevation: 453 m (1,486 ft)
- Lowest elevation: 372 m (1,220 ft)
- Population (2023): 92
  - Density: 9.2/km^{2} (24/sq mi)
- Time zone: UTC+01:00 (CET)
  - Summer (DST): UTC+02:00 (CEST)
- INSEE/Postal code: 23009 /23170
- ^{1} French Land Register data, which excludes lakes, ponds, glaciers > 1 km^{2} (0.386 sq mi or 247 acres) and river estuaries.

Auge (French pronunciation: [oʒ]; Occitan: Auja) is a commune in the Creuse department in the Nouvelle-Aquitaine region in central France.

== Geography ==
A small farming area comprising the village and a couple of hamlets situated by the banks of the small river Verneigette, some 17 miles (27 km) northeast of Aubusson near the junction of the D14 and the N145 roads.

== Population ==
Historical population
Year	Pop.	±% p.a.
1968	205	—
1975	149	−4.46%
1982	131	−1.82%
1990	124	−0.68%
1999	109	−1.42%
2007	107	−0.23%
2012	104	−0.57%
2017	98	−1.18%
2023	92	−1.05%
Source: INSEE

== Sights ==
- The church, dating from the twelfth century.

== See also ==
- Communes of the Creuse department
