= Chambon-sur-Voueize =

Commune in Nouvelle-Aquitaine, France

- Commune
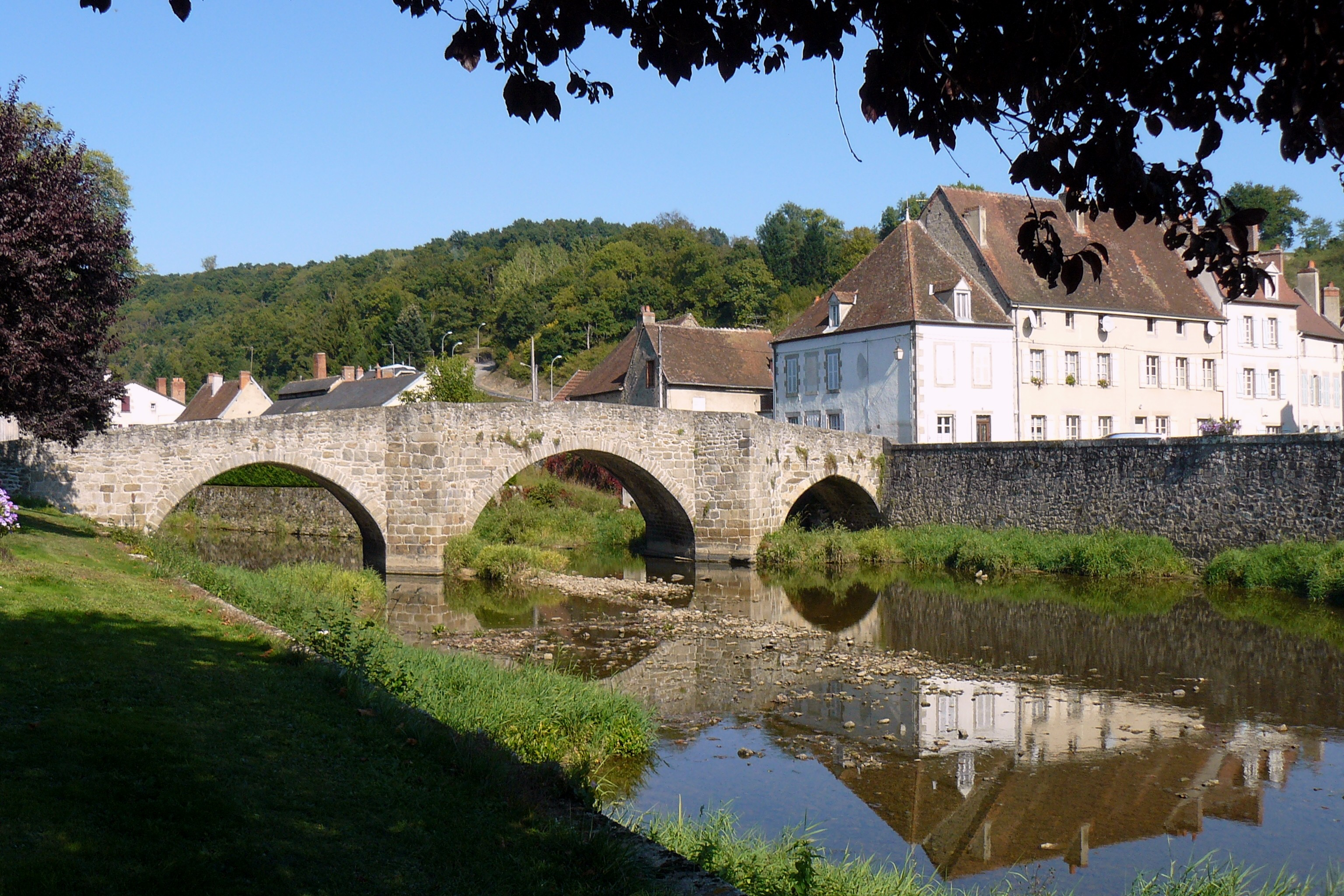
- The Romanesque bridge in Chambon-sur-Voueize

- Coat of arms
- Location of Chambon-sur-Voueize
- Location within France Location within Nouvelle-Aquitaine
- Coordinates: 46°11′24″N 2°25′33″E
- Country: France
- Region: Nouvelle-Aquitaine
- Department: Creuse
- Arrondissement: Aubusson
- Canton: Évaux-les-Bains
- Intercommunality: CC Creuse Confluence

Government
  - Mayor (2020–2026): Cécile Creuzon
- Area^{1}: 33.58 km^{2} (12.97 sq mi)
- Highest elevation: 510 m (1,670 ft)
- Lowest elevation: 320 m (1,050 ft)
- Population (2023): 794
  - Density: 23.6/km^{2} (61.2/sq mi)
- Time zone: UTC+01:00 (CET)
  - Summer (DST): UTC+02:00 (CEST)
- INSEE/Postal code: 23045 /23170
- ^{1} French Land Register data, which excludes lakes, ponds, glaciers > 1 km^{2} (0.386 sq mi or 247 acres) and river estuaries.

Chambon-sur-Voueize (French pronunciation: [ʃɑ̃bɔ̃ syʁ vwɛz], literally Chambon on Voueize; Occitan: Chambon sus Voeisa) is a commune in the Creuse department in the Nouvelle-Aquitaine region in central France. Today, Chambon-sur-Voueize is recognized as one of the Les Plus Beaux Villages de France.

== Geography ==
An area of lakes, forestry and farming comprising a small town and several hamlets, situated at the confluence of the rivers Voueize and Tardes, some 10 miles (16 km) southwest of Montluçon near the junction of the D915, D917 and the D993 roads.

== Population ==
The town had 2,125 inhabitants in 1841.

Historical population
Year	Pop.	±% p.a.
1968	1,367	—
1975	1,206	−1.77%
1982	1,288	+0.94%
1990	1,105	−1.90%
1999	1,012	−0.97%
2007	1,014	+0.02%
2012	962	−1.05%
2017	892	−1.50%
2023	794	−1.92%
Source: INSEE

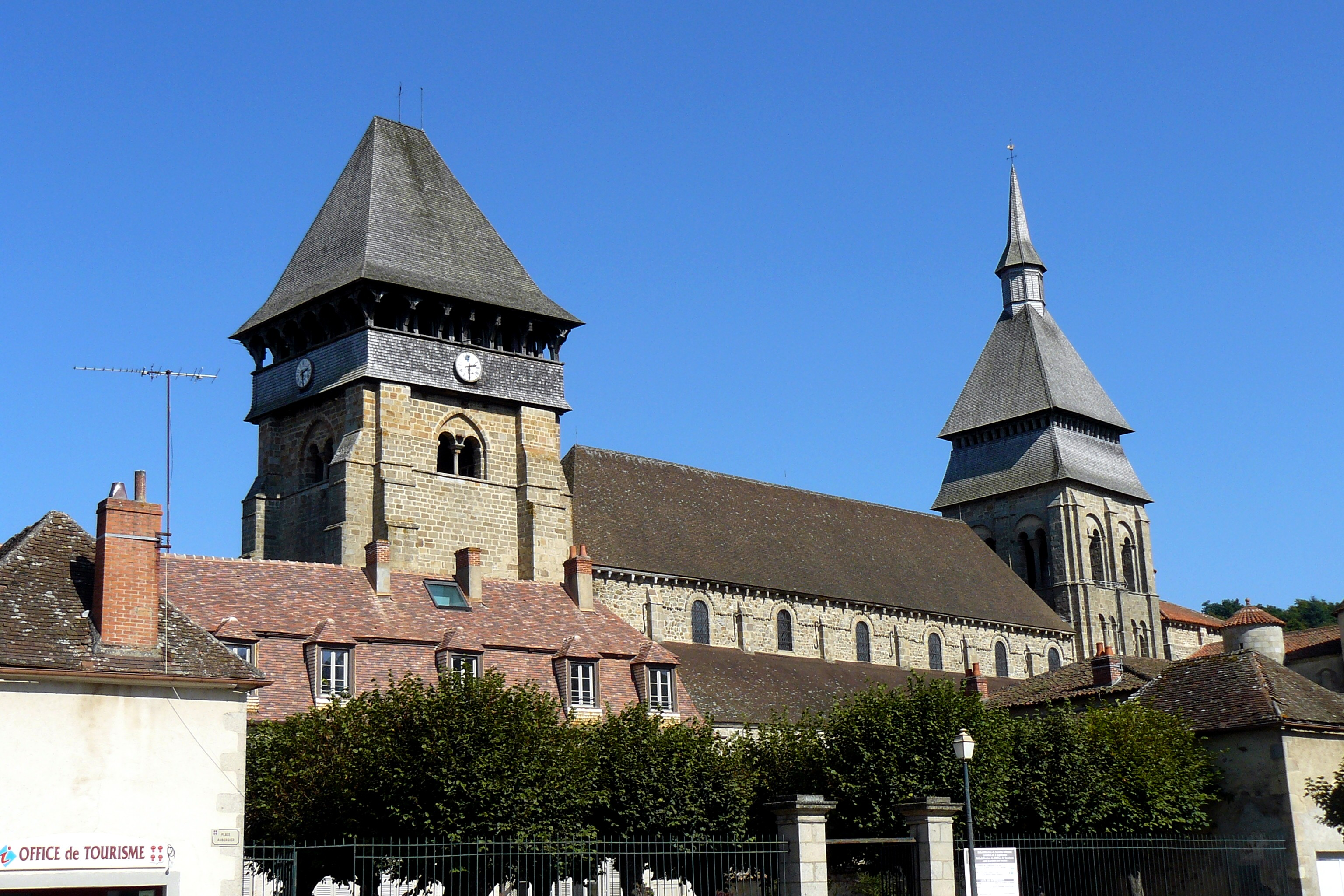
The church of Sainte-Valérie

== Sights ==
- The abbey church of St. Valerie, dating from the eleventh century.
- The château de Marsat.
- The ruined castle at Barbe-Bleu.
- A medieval bridge over the Voueize.

== See also ==
- Communes of the Creuse department
