= Verneiges =

Commune in Nouvelle-Aquitaine, France

- Commune
- Coat of arms
- Location of Verneiges
- Location within France Location within Nouvelle-Aquitaine
- Coordinates: 46°16′09″N 2°20′19″E
- Country: France
- Region: Nouvelle-Aquitaine
- Department: Creuse
- Arrondissement: Aubusson
- Canton: Évaux-les-Bains
- Intercommunality: CC Creuse Confluence

Government
  - Mayor (2020–2026): Mathieu Zanetta
- Area^{1}: 7.59 km^{2} (2.93 sq mi)
- Elevation: 185 m (607 ft)
- Highest elevation: 453 m (1,486 ft)
- Lowest elevation: 397 m (1,302 ft)
- Population (2023): 119
  - Density: 15.7/km^{2} (40.6/sq mi)
- Time zone: UTC+01:00 (CET)
  - Summer (DST): UTC+02:00 (CEST)
- INSEE/Postal code: 23259 /23170
- ^{1} French Land Register data, which excludes lakes, ponds, glaciers > 1 km^{2} (0.386 sq mi or 247 acres) and river estuaries.

Verneiges (French pronunciation: [vɛʁnɛʒ]; Occitan: Vernejes) is a commune in the Creuse department in the Nouvelle-Aquitaine region in central France.

== Geography ==
A farming area comprising a very small village and a couple of hamlets situated by the banks of the river Verneigette, some 19 miles (31 km) southwest of Montluçon, at the junction of the D66 and the D917 roads and on the N145 road.

== Population ==
Historical population
Year	Pop.	±% p.a.
1968	143	—
1975	120	−2.47%
1982	95	−3.28%
1990	71	−3.57%
1999	86	+2.15%
2007	93	+0.98%
2012	106	+2.65%
2017	114	+1.47%
2023	119	+0.72%
Source: INSEE

== See also ==
- Communes of the Creuse department
