= Nouhant =

Commune in Nouvelle-Aquitaine, France

- Commune
- Coat of arms
- Location of Nouhant
- Location within France Location within Nouvelle-Aquitaine
- Coordinates: 46°17′06″N 2°23′29″E
- Country: France
- Region: Nouvelle-Aquitaine
- Department: Creuse
- Arrondissement: Aubusson
- Canton: Évaux-les-Bains
- Intercommunality: CC Creuse Confluence

Government
  - Mayor (2020–2026): Nicolas Simonnet
- Area^{1}: 25.75 km^{2} (9.94 sq mi)
- Elevation: 410 m (1,350 ft)
- Highest elevation: 555 m (1,821 ft)
- Lowest elevation: 417 m (1,368 ft)
- Population (2023): 313
  - Density: 12.2/km^{2} (31.5/sq mi)
- Time zone: UTC+01:00 (CET)
  - Summer (DST): UTC+02:00 (CEST)
- INSEE/Postal code: 23145 /23170
- ^{1} French Land Register data, which excludes lakes, ponds, glaciers > 1 km^{2} (0.386 sq mi or 247 acres) and river estuaries.

Nouhant (French pronunciation: [nu.ɑ̃]; Occitan: Noent) is a commune in the Creuse department in the Nouvelle-Aquitaine region in central France.

== Geography ==
A area of farming, lakes and streams comprising the village and several hamlets situated by the banks of the small river Verneigette, some 12 miles (19 km) southwest of Montluçon, at the junction of the D64, D66 and the N145 roads. The commune borders the department of Allier to the east.

== Population ==
Historical population
Year	Pop.	±% p.a.
1968	508	—
1975	446	−1.84%
1982	378	−2.34%
1990	355	−0.78%
1999	323	−1.04%
2007	312	−0.43%
2012	315	+0.19%
2017	283	−2.12%
2023	313	+1.69%
Source: INSEE

== Sights ==
- The church, dating from the twelfth century.
- The remains of a fifteenth-century fortified house at Fressinaud.
- The Château du Clos.
- A fifteenth-century stone cross.

== See also ==
- Communes of the Creuse department
