= Viersat =

Commune in Nouvelle-Aquitaine, France

Versat
- Commune
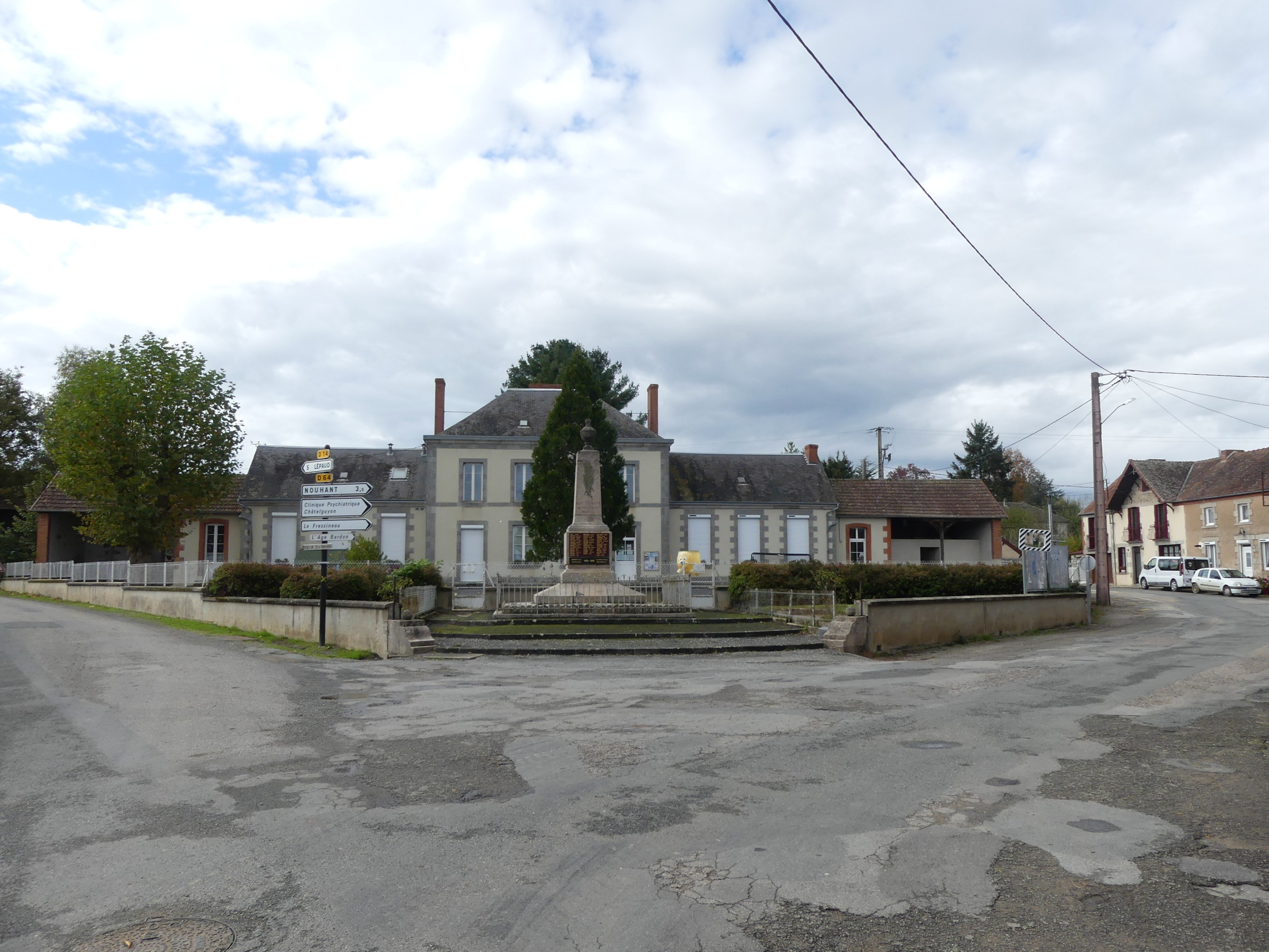
- Viersat Town hall

- Coat of arms
- Location of Versat
- Location within France Location within Nouvelle-Aquitaine
- Coordinates: 46°16′17″N 2°25′55″E
- Country: France
- Region: Nouvelle-Aquitaine
- Department: Creuse
- Arrondissement: Aubusson
- Canton: Évaux-les-Bains
- Intercommunality: CC Creuse Confluence

Government
  - Mayor (2020–2026): Nadine Glomeaud
- Area^{1}: 29.09 km^{2} (11.23 sq mi)
- Highest elevation: 494 m (1,621 ft)
- Lowest elevation: 369 m (1,211 ft)
- Population (2023): 278
  - Density: 9.56/km^{2} (24.8/sq mi)
- Time zone: UTC+01:00 (CET)
  - Summer (DST): UTC+02:00 (CEST)
- INSEE/Postal code: 23261 /23170
- ^{1} French Land Register data, which excludes lakes, ponds, glaciers > 1 km^{2} (0.386 sq mi or 247 acres) and river estuaries.

Versat (French pronunciation: [vjɛʁsa]; Occitan: Viersac) is a commune in the Creuse department in the Nouvelle-Aquitaine region in central France.

== Geography ==
A farming area comprising a village and several hamlets situated some 18 miles (29 km) southwest of Montluçon, at the junction of the D14, D41 and the D64 roads.

== Population ==
Historical population
Year	Pop.	±% p.a.
1968	464	—
1975	396	−2.24%
1982	343	−2.03%
1990	378	+1.22%
1999	348	−0.91%
2007	347	−0.04%
2012	303	−2.68%
2017	303	+0.00%
2023	278	−1.42%
Source: INSEE

== Sights ==
- The church, dating from the twelfth century.
- The seventeenth-century château de Chatelguyon.

== See also ==
- Communes of the Creuse department
