= Cantons of the Creuse department =

The following is a list of the 15 cantons of the Creuse department, in France, following the French canton reorganisation which came into effect in March 2015:

- Ahun
- Aubusson
- Auzances
- Bonnat
- Bourganeuf
- Boussac
- Dun-le-Palestel
- Évaux-les-Bains
- Felletin
- Gouzon
- Le Grand-Bourg
- Guéret-1
- Guéret-2
- Saint-Vaury
- La Souterraine
