= Cher (river) =

River in France

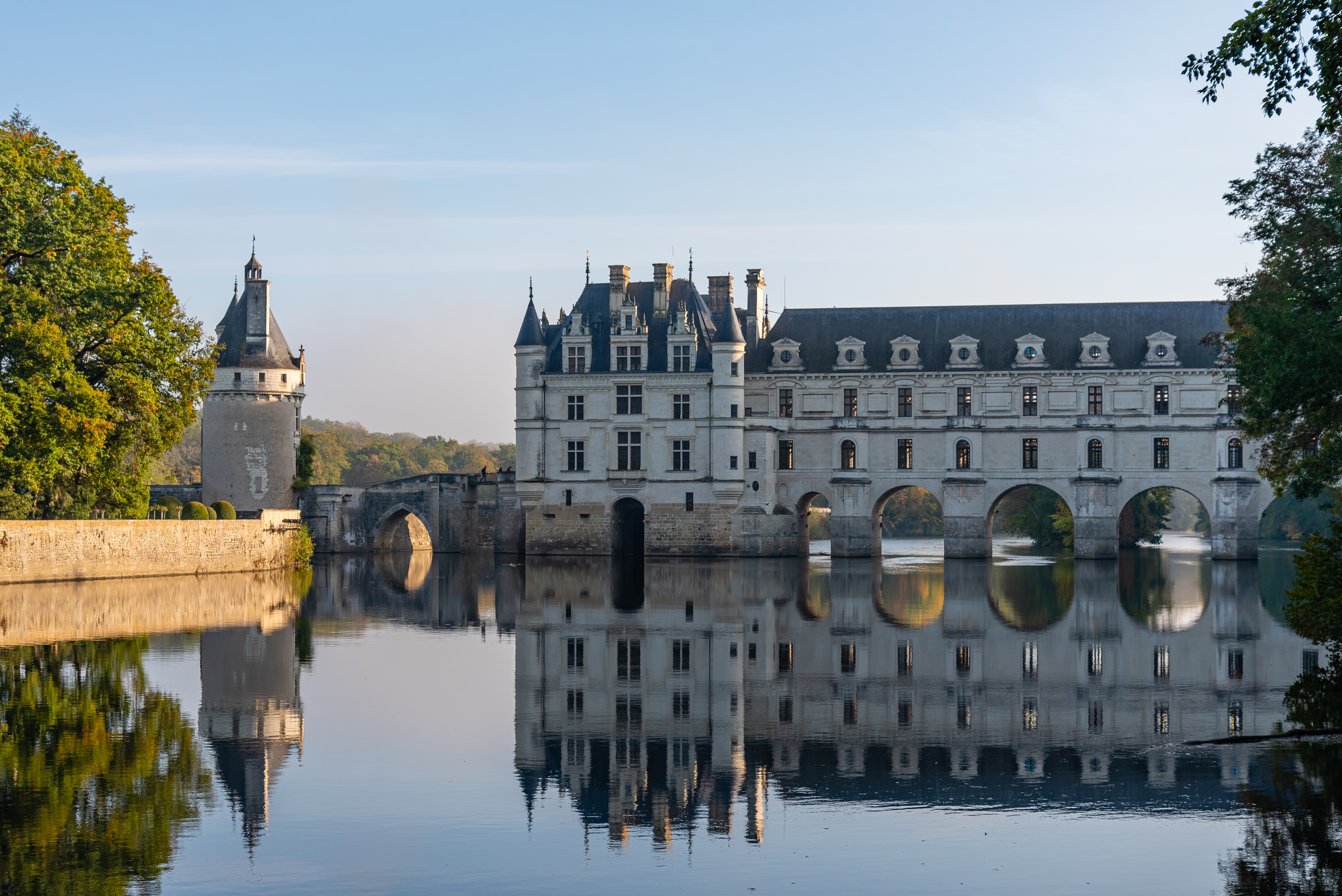
- The Château de Chenonceau on the Cher

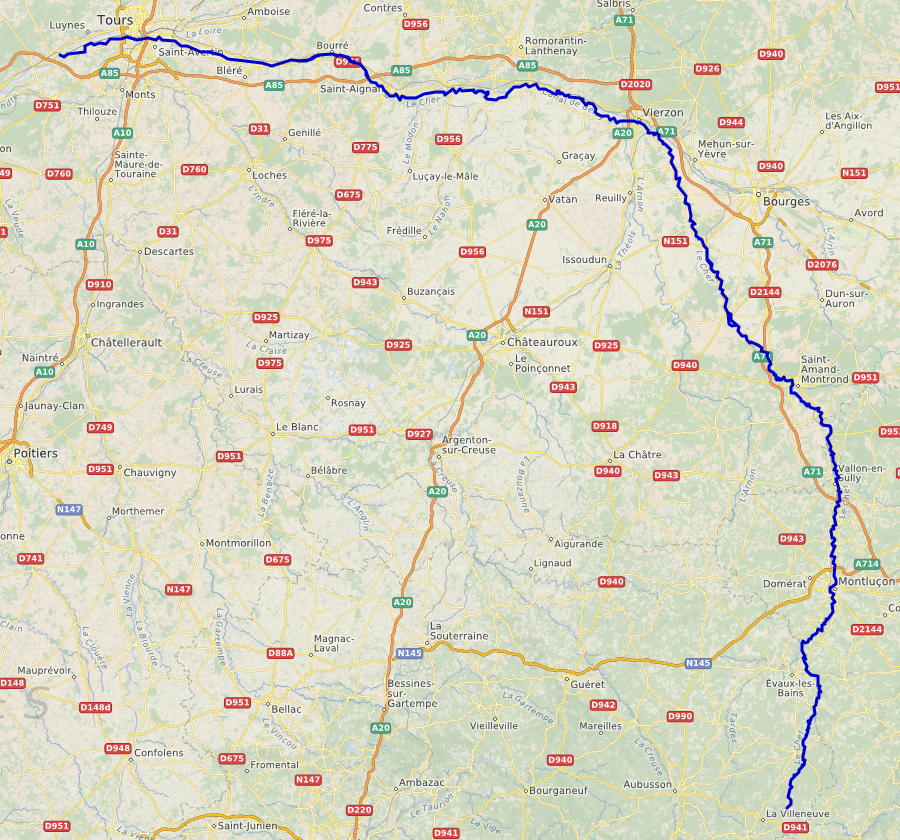
- Native name: Char (Occitan)

Location
- Country: France

Physical characteristics
- Source
  - location: Massif Central
  - elevation: 762 m (2,500 ft)
- Mouth
  - location: Loire
  - coordinates: 47°20′33″N 0°28′49″E
- Length: 365.1 km (226.9 mi)
- Basin size: 13,718 km^{2} (5,297 mi^{2})
- Discharge
  - average: 104 m^{3}/s (3,700 cu ft/s)

Basin features
- Progression: Loire→ Atlantic Ocean

The Cher (/ʃɛər/ SHAIR, French: [ʃɛʁ]; Occitan: Char) is a river in central France, a left tributary of the Loire, with a length of 365.1 km (226.9 mi), and a basin area of 13,718 km^{2} (5,297 sq mi). The source is in the Creuse department, north-east of Crocq. It joins the river Loire at Villandry, west of Tours.

The river suffered a devastating flood in 1940, which damaged the Château de Chenonceau, which spans the river, and other structures along the banks. It owes its name to the pre-Indo-European root kʰar 'stone'.

== Departments and towns ==
The Cher flows through the following departments, and along the following towns:

- Creuse
- Allier: Montluçon
- Cher: Saint-Amand-Montrond, Vierzon
- Loir-et-Cher
- Indre-et-Loire: Tours

== Tributaries ==
The main tributaries of the Cher are, from spring to mouth (L: left / R: right):

- (L) Tardes
  - (L) Voueize
- (R) Amaron or Lamaron at Montluçon
- (R) Aumance at Meaulne
- (R) Yèvre at Vierzon
  - (L) Auron
  - (R) Colin
- (L) Arnon at Vierzon
  - (L) Théols
- (R) Sauldre at Selles-sur-Cher
- (L) Fouzon above Saint-Aignan

== Navigation ==
The Cher was part of a network of waterways that linked the city of Tours to Nevers, where connections to other regions of France existed. As of 2018, only the 54 kilometres (34 mi) section between Larçay (southeast of Tours) and Noyers-sur-Cher is navigable for small boats (maximum draft 80 cm). It has 14 locks. At Noyers-sur-Cher, it is connected with the Canal de Berry, of which only the westernmost 15 kilometres (9.3 mi) section until Selles-sur-Cher is navigable.
