= Tardes =

Commune in Nouvelle-Aquitaine, France

- Commune
- Location of Tardes
- Location within France Location within Nouvelle-Aquitaine
- Coordinates: 46°08′26″N 2°20′45″E
- Country: France
- Region: Nouvelle-Aquitaine
- Department: Creuse
- Arrondissement: Aubusson
- Canton: Évaux-les-Bains
- Intercommunality: CC Creuse Confluence

Government
  - Mayor (2020–2026): Régis Derboule
- Area^{1}: 21.4 km^{2} (8.3 sq mi)
- Elevation: 400 m (1,300 ft)
- Highest elevation: 514 m (1,686 ft)
- Lowest elevation: 358 m (1,175 ft)
- Population (2023): 119
  - Density: 5.56/km^{2} (14.4/sq mi)
- Time zone: UTC+01:00 (CET)
  - Summer (DST): UTC+02:00 (CEST)
- INSEE/Postal code: 23251 /23170
- ^{1} French Land Register data, which excludes lakes, ponds, glaciers > 1 km^{2} (0.386 sq mi or 247 acres) and river estuaries.

Tardes (French pronunciation: [taʁd]; Occitan: Tardas) is a commune in the Creuse department in the Nouvelle-Aquitaine region in central France.

== Geography ==
A farming area comprising several small villages and hamlets situated by the banks of the river Tardes, some 16 miles (26 km) north of Aubusson, between the D993 and the D41.

== Population ==
Historical population
Year	Pop.	±% p.a.
1968	255	—
1975	216	−2.34%
1982	149	−5.17%
1990	154	+0.41%
1999	127	−2.12%
2007	139	+1.13%
2012	148	+1.26%
2017	138	−1.39%
2023	119	−2.44%
Source: INSEE

== Sights ==
- The church, dating from the nineteenth century.
- The church at Mazeirat, dating from the twelfth century.
- The eighteenth-century château de Montflour.

== See also ==
- Communes of the Creuse department
