= Communauté de communes du Pays de Boussac =

Coordinates: 46.3499°N 2.2206°E

Pays de Boussac
- Former communauté de communes
- Interactive map of Pays de Boussac
- Country: France
- Region: Nouvelle-Aquitaine
- Department: Creuse
- No. of communes: {{{nbcomm}}}
- Established: 1993
- Disbanded: 2017
- Population (1999): 5,684

The communauté de communes du Pays de Boussac was created on December 28, 1992, and is located in the Creuse département of the Limousin region of central France. It was created in January 1993. It was merged into the new Communauté de communes Creuse Confluence in January 2017.

It comprised the following 13 communes:

- Bord-Saint-Georges
- Boussac
- Boussac-Bourg
- Bussière-Saint-Georges
- Lavaufranche
- Leyrat
- Malleret-Boussac
- Nouzerines
- Saint-Marien
- Saint-Pierre-le-Bost
- Saint-Silvain-Bas-le-Roc
- Soumans
- Toulx-Sainte-Croix

== See also ==
- Communes of the Creuse department
