= Communauté de communes du Carrefour des Quatre Provinces =

Coordinates: 46.1947°N 2.2388°E

Carrefour des Quatre Provinces
- Former communauté de communes
- Interactive map of Carrefour des Quatre Provinces
- Country: France
- Region: Nouvelle-Aquitaine
- Department: Creuse
- No. of communes: {{{nbcomm}}}
- Established: 1999
- Disbanded: 2017
- Area: 334 km^{2} (129 sq mi)
- Population (2013): 5,873
  - Density: 17.6/km^{2} (45.5/sq mi)

The communauté de communes du Carrefour des Quatre Provinces was located in the Creuse département of the Nouvelle-Aquitaine region of central France. It was created in January 1999. It was merged into the new Communauté de communes Creuse Confluence in January 2017.

It comprised the following 15 communes:

- Blaudeix
- Cressat
- La Celle-sous-Gouzon
- Domeyrot
- Gouzon
- Jarnages
- Ladapeyre
- Parsac-Rimondeix
- Pierrefitte
- Pionnat
- Saint-Julien-le-Châtel
- Saint-Loup
- Saint-Silvain-sous-Toulx
- Trois-Fonds
- Vigeville
