= Canton of Jarnages =

Coordinates: 46°13′00″N 2°10′01″E

Jarnages
- Former canton
- Interactive map of Jarnages
- Country: France
- Region: Nouvelle-Aquitaine
- Department: Creuse
- No. of communes: {{{nbcomm}}}
- Disbanded: 2015
- Area: 182.28 km^{2} (70.38 sq mi)
- Population (2012): 3,540
  - Density: 19.4/km^{2} (50.3/sq mi)

The Canton of Jarnages is a former canton situated in the Creuse département and in the Limousin region of central France. It was disbanded following the French canton reorganisation which came into effect in March 2015. It consisted of 10 communes, which joined the new canton of Gouzon in 2015. It had 3,540 inhabitants (2012).

== Geography ==
An area of valleys and plateaux, consisting of woodland and farmland, with the town of Jarnages, in the arrondissement of Guéret, at its centre. The altitude varies from 333m (Domeyrot) to 625m (Saint-Silvain-sous-Toulx) with an average altitude of 427m.

The canton comprised 10 communes:

- Blaudeix
- La Celle-sous-Gouzon
- Domeyrot
- Gouzon
- Jarnages
- Parsac
- Pierrefitte
- Rimondeix
- Saint-Silvain-sous-Toulx
- Trois-Fonds

== Population ==
Canton Population Chart
1962	1968	1975	1982	1990	1999
4163	4459	3946	3656	3377	3257
Census count starting from 1962 : Population without double counting

== See also ==
- Arrondissements of the Creuse department
- Cantons of the Creuse department
- Communes of the Creuse department
