= Silvanus of Ahun =

Saint Silvanus of Ahun

Martyr
- Died: 407 AD; Ahun, France
- Venerated in: Roman Catholic Church
- Major shrine: Saint-Silvain d'Ahun
- Feast: 16 October
- Attributes: dressed in a dalmatic, bearing a book and a palm.
- Patronage: Ahun; Château-Chervix

Silvanus (or Sylvanus; French: Silvain, Sauvan, Salvan, Souvain) of Ahun is venerated as a martyr and saint.

According to the tradition, Silvanus was a deacon who was killed by Vandals at the battle of Agedunum or Acitodunum (Ahun) on 16 October 407.

== Veneration ==
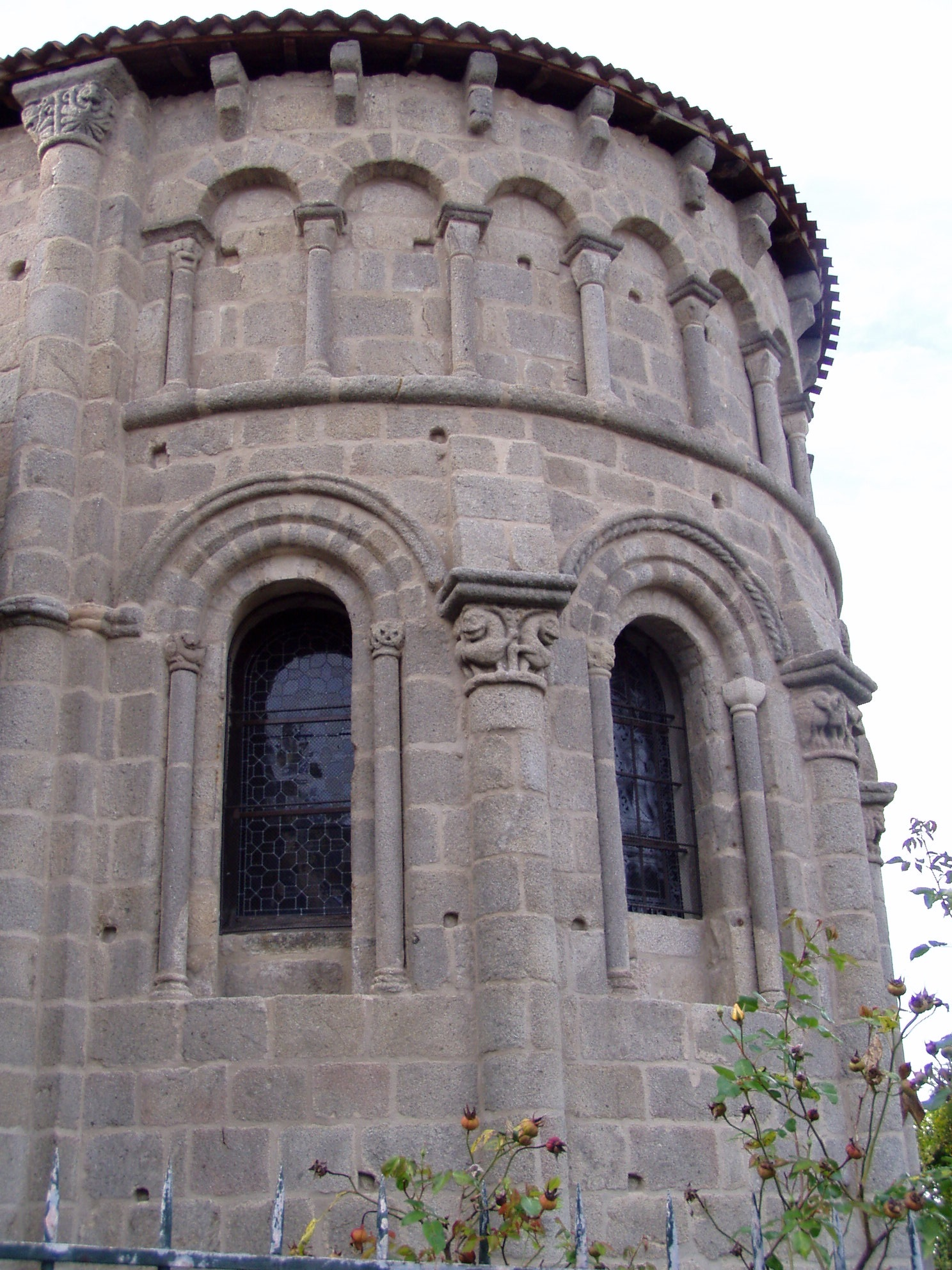
Chevet de Saint-Silvain d’Ahun.

The antiquity of his cult is based on the fact that there was an ancient tomb said to carry his relics; the tomb rests in the crypt of the 12th-century church of Saint-Silvain d’Ahun. In a wood panel dating from 1639, he is depicted dressed in a dalmatic, bearing a book and a palm.

The following places carry Silvanus' name :

- Saint-Silvain-Bas-le-Roc
- Saint-Silvain-Bellegarde
- Saint-Silvain-Montaigut
- Saint-Silvain-sous-Toulx
