= Boussac =

Boussac may refer to:

== Places in France ==
- Boussac, Aveyron, in the Aveyron department
- Boussac, Creuse, in the Creuse department
  - Château de Boussac, Creuse
- Boussac, Lot, in the Lot department
- La Boussac, in the Ille-et-Vilaine department
- Boussac-Bourg, in the Creuse department

== People ==
- Marcel Boussac (1889-1980), French entrepreneur
