= Canton of Boussac =

Coordinates: 46°20′55″N 2°13′37″E

Boussac
- Canton
- Interactive map of Boussac
- Country: France
- Region: Nouvelle-Aquitaine
- Department: Creuse
- No. of communes: {{{nbcomm}}}
- Area: 384.12 km^{2} (148.31 sq mi)
- Population (2023): 6,221
  - Density: 16.20/km^{2} (41.95/sq mi)
- INSEE code: 23 06

The Canton of Boussac is a canton situated in the Creuse département and in the Nouvelle-Aquitaine region of central France.

== Geography ==
An area of farming and forestry in the arrondissement of Guéret, centred on the town of Boussac. The altitude varies from 298m (Malleret-Boussac) to 656m (Toulx-Sainte-Croix) with an average altitude of 458m.

== Population ==
Historical population
Year	Pop.	±% p.a.
2013	6,519	—
2018	6,209	−0.97%
Source: INSEE

== Composition ==
At the French canton reorganisation which came into effect in March 2015, the canton was expanded from 13 to 17 communes:

- Bétête
- Bord-Saint-Georges
- Boussac
- Boussac-Bourg
- Bussière-Saint-Georges
- Clugnat
- Jalesches
- Lavaufranche
- Leyrat
- Malleret-Boussac
- Nouzerines
- Saint-Marien
- Saint-Pierre-le-Bost
- Saint-Silvain-Bas-le-Roc
- Soumans
- Toulx-Sainte-Croix
- Tercillat

== See also ==
- Arrondissements of the Creuse department
- Cantons of the Creuse department
- Communes of the Creuse department
