= Bétête =

Commune in Nouvelle-Aquitaine, France

- Commune
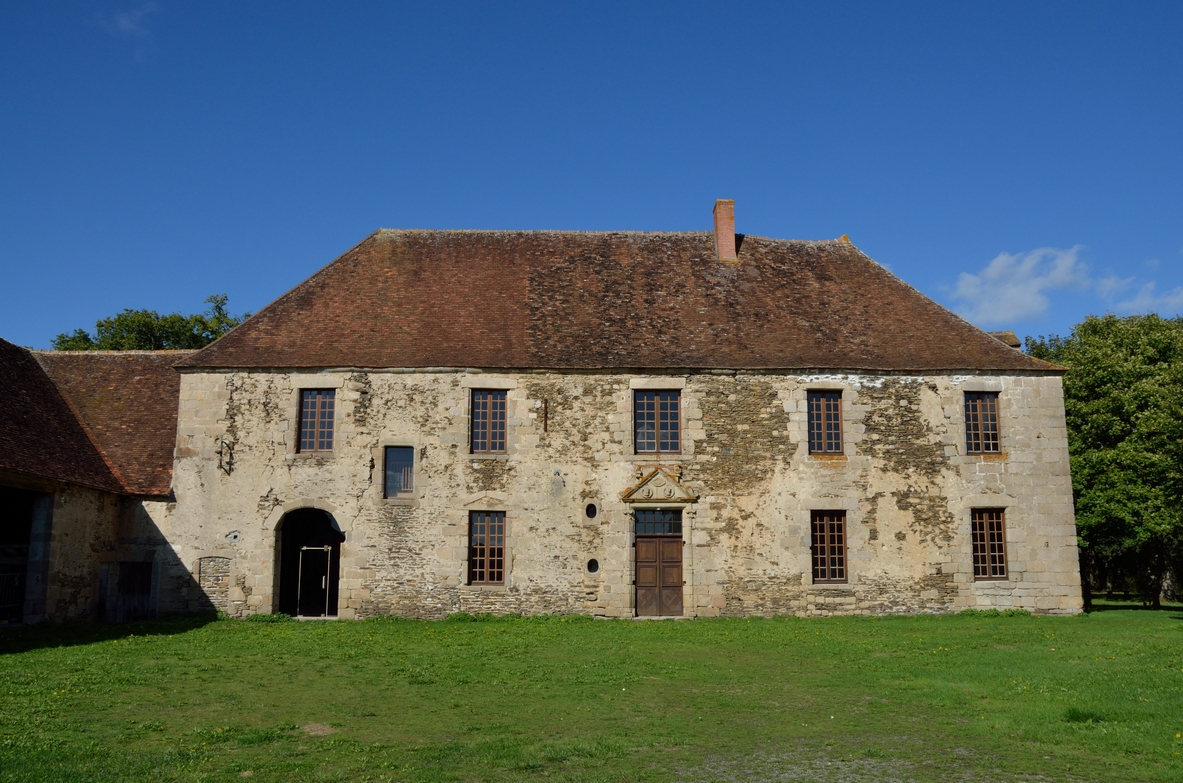
- Abbey of Prébenoît
- Location of Bétête
- Location within France Location within Nouvelle-Aquitaine
- Coordinates: 46°21′37″N 2°04′42″E
- Country: France
- Region: Nouvelle-Aquitaine
- Department: Creuse
- Arrondissement: Aubusson
- Canton: Boussac
- Intercommunality: CC Creuse Confluence

Government
  - Mayor (2020–2026): Martial Delcuze
- Area^{1}: 28.24 km^{2} (10.90 sq mi)
- Elevation: 380 m (1,250 ft)
- Highest elevation: 430 m (1,410 ft)
- Lowest elevation: 272 m (892 ft)
- Population (2023): 389
  - Density: 13.8/km^{2} (35.7/sq mi)
- Time zone: UTC+01:00 (CET)
  - Summer (DST): UTC+02:00 (CEST)
- INSEE/Postal code: 23022 /23270
- ^{1} French Land Register data, which excludes lakes, ponds, glaciers > 1 km^{2} (0.386 sq mi or 247 acres) and river estuaries.

Bétête (French pronunciation: [betɛt]; Occitan: Beteste) is a commune in the Creuse department in the Nouvelle-Aquitaine region in central France.

== Geography ==
A farming area comprising the village and several hamlets situated some 15 miles (24 km) northeast of Guéret, at the junction of the D15, D83 and the D88. The Petite Creuse river forms most of the southern and western border of the commune.

== Population ==
Historical population
Year	Pop.	±% p.a.
1968	668	—
1975	651	−0.37%
1982	638	−0.29%
1990	525	−2.41%
1999	427	−2.27%
2007	366	−1.91%
2012	337	−1.64%
2017	365	+1.61%
2023	389	+1.07%
Source: INSEE

== Sights ==
- The church, dating from the twelfth century.
- The ruins of the medieval castle of Bétête.
- Two châteaux, of le Moisse and of Ecosse, both dating from the seventeenth century.
- The twelfth century abbey of Prébenoît, undergoing restoration.

== See also ==
- Communes of the Creuse department
