= Clugnat =

Commune in Nouvelle-Aquitaine, France

- Commune
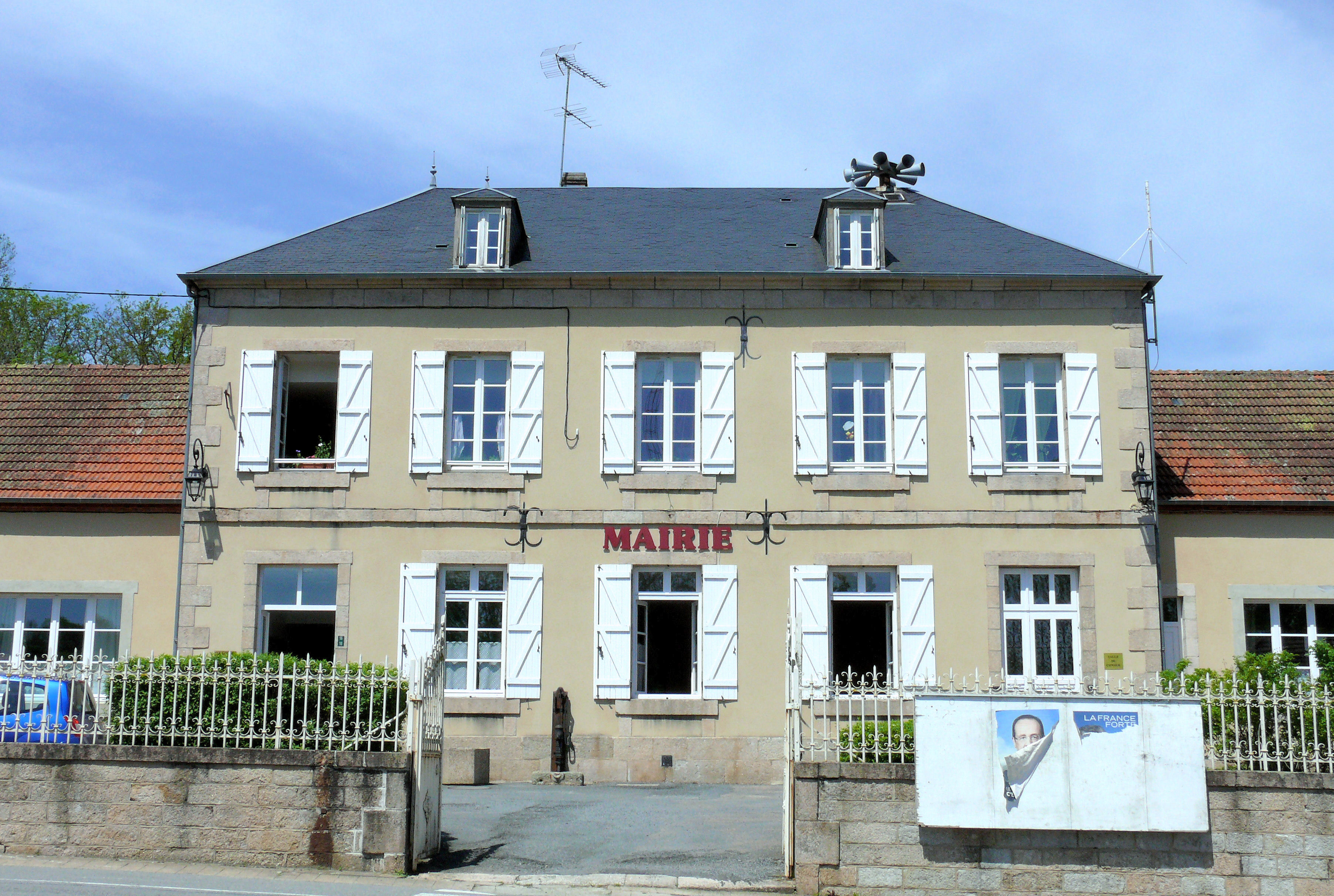
- The town hall in Clugnat

- Coat of arms
- Location of Clugnat
- Location within France Location within Nouvelle-Aquitaine
- Coordinates: 46°18′33″N 2°07′09″E
- Country: France
- Region: Nouvelle-Aquitaine
- Department: Creuse
- Arrondissement: Aubusson
- Canton: Boussac
- Intercommunality: CC Creuse Confluence

Government
  - Mayor (2020–2026): Yves Thomazon
- Area^{1}: 42.42 km^{2} (16.38 sq mi)
- Elevation: 330 m (1,080 ft)
- Highest elevation: 537 m (1,762 ft)
- Lowest elevation: 287 m (942 ft)
- Population (2023): 652
  - Density: 15.4/km^{2} (39.8/sq mi)
- Time zone: UTC+01:00 (CET)
  - Summer (DST): UTC+02:00 (CEST)
- INSEE/Postal code: 23064 /23270
- ^{1} French Land Register data, which excludes lakes, ponds, glaciers > 1 km^{2} (0.386 sq mi or 247 acres) and river estuaries.

Clugnat (French pronunciation: [klyɲa]; Occitan: Clunhac) is a commune in the Creuse department in the Nouvelle-Aquitaine region in central France.

== Geography ==
An area of forestry and farming comprising the village and several hamlets, situated in the valleys of the Petite Creuse and the Verraux rivers, some 15 miles (24 km) northeast of Guéret at the junction of the D14, D11 and the D68 roads.

== Population ==
Historical population
Year	Pop.	±% p.a.
1968	916	—
1975	836	−1.30%
1982	809	−0.47%
1990	752	−0.91%
1999	687	−1.00%
2007	674	−0.24%
2012	710	+1.05%
2017	645	−1.90%
2023	652	+0.18%
Source: INSEE

== Sights ==
- The church of St. Martial, dating from the twelfth century.
- The modern chapel of St. John.
- The remains of the château de Bâtisse.
- An unusual war memorial.

== See also ==
- Communes of the Creuse department
