= Ahun =

Commune in Nouvelle-Aquitaine, France

- Commune
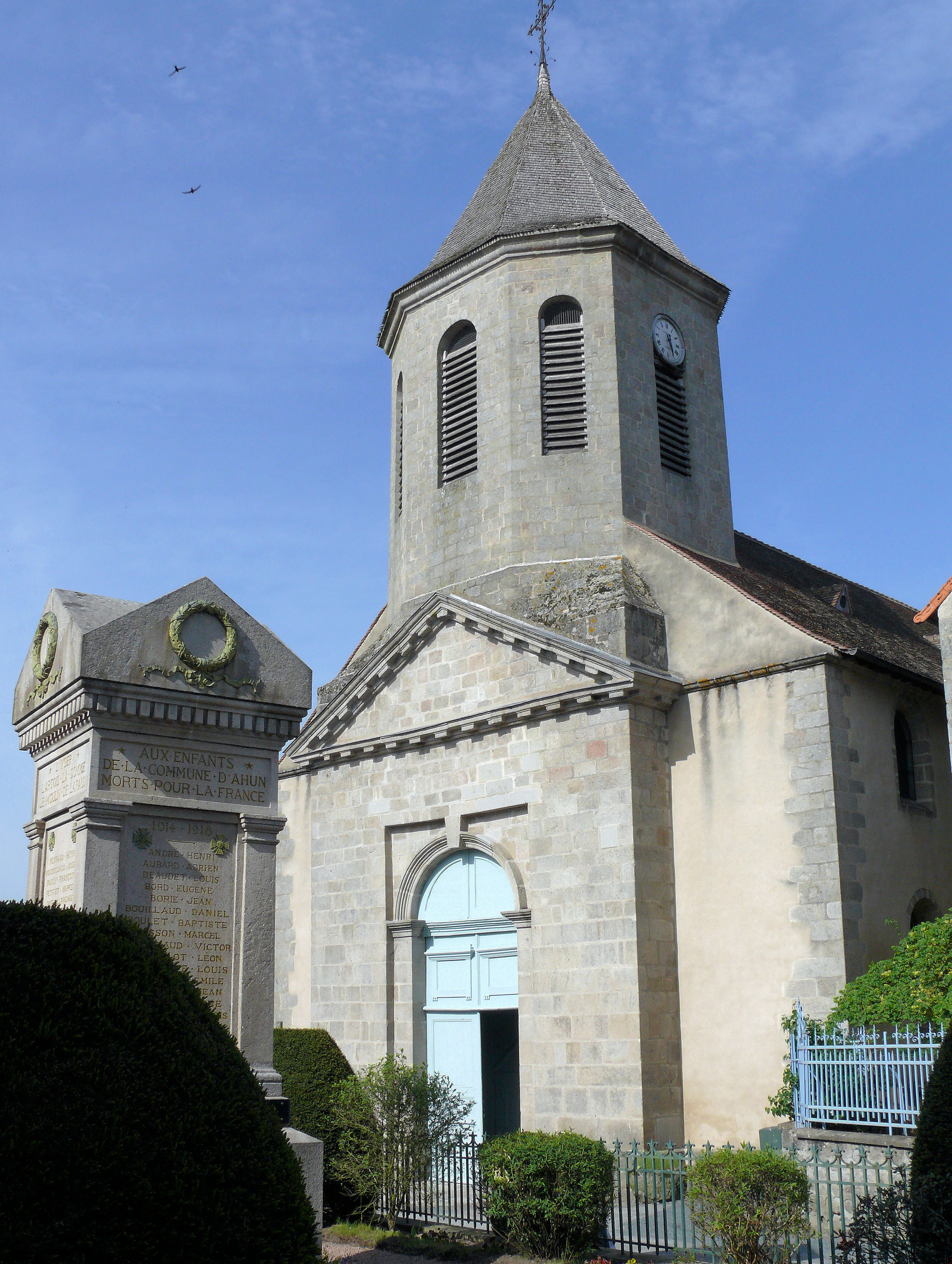
- The war memorial and the church of Saint-Sylvain, in Ahun

- Coat of arms
- Location of Ahun
- Location within France Location within Nouvelle-Aquitaine
- Coordinates: 46°05′14″N 2°02′45″E
- Country: France
- Region: Nouvelle-Aquitaine
- Department: Creuse
- Arrondissement: Guéret
- Canton: Ahun
- Intercommunality: Creuse Sud Ouest

Government
  - Mayor (2020–2026): Thierry Cotiche
- Area^{1}: 33.74 km^{2} (13.03 sq mi)
- Elevation: 449 m (1,473 ft)
- Highest elevation: 564 m (1,850 ft)
- Lowest elevation: 331 m (1,086 ft)
- Population (2023): 1,394
  - Density: 41.32/km^{2} (107.0/sq mi)
- Time zone: UTC+01:00 (CET)
  - Summer (DST): UTC+02:00 (CEST)
- INSEE/Postal code: 23001 /23150
- ^{1} French Land Register data, which excludes lakes, ponds, glaciers > 1 km^{2} (0.386 sq mi or 247 acres) and river estuaries.

Ahun (French pronunciation: [a.œ̃]; Occitan: Aiun) is a commune in the Creuse department in the Nouvelle-Aquitaine region in central France.

== Geography ==
A farming area comprising the village and several hamlets situated in the valley of the Creuse, some 15 km (9.3 mi) southeast of Guéret, at the junction of the D942, D13 and the D18. It was the Roman site of Acitodunum, an important town on the route between Limoges and Clermont-Ferrand.

== Population ==
Historical population
| Year | Pop. | ±% p.a. |
|---|---|---|
| 1968 | 1,623 | — |
| 1975 | 1,605 | −0.16% |
| 1982 | 1,529 | −0.69% |
| 1990 | 1,481 | −0.40% |
| 1999 | 1,501 | +0.15% |
| 2007 | 1,557 | +0.46% |
| 2012 | 1,528 | −0.38% |
| 2017 | 1,432 | −1.29% |
| 2023 | 1,394 | −0.45% |
Source: INSEE

== Sights ==
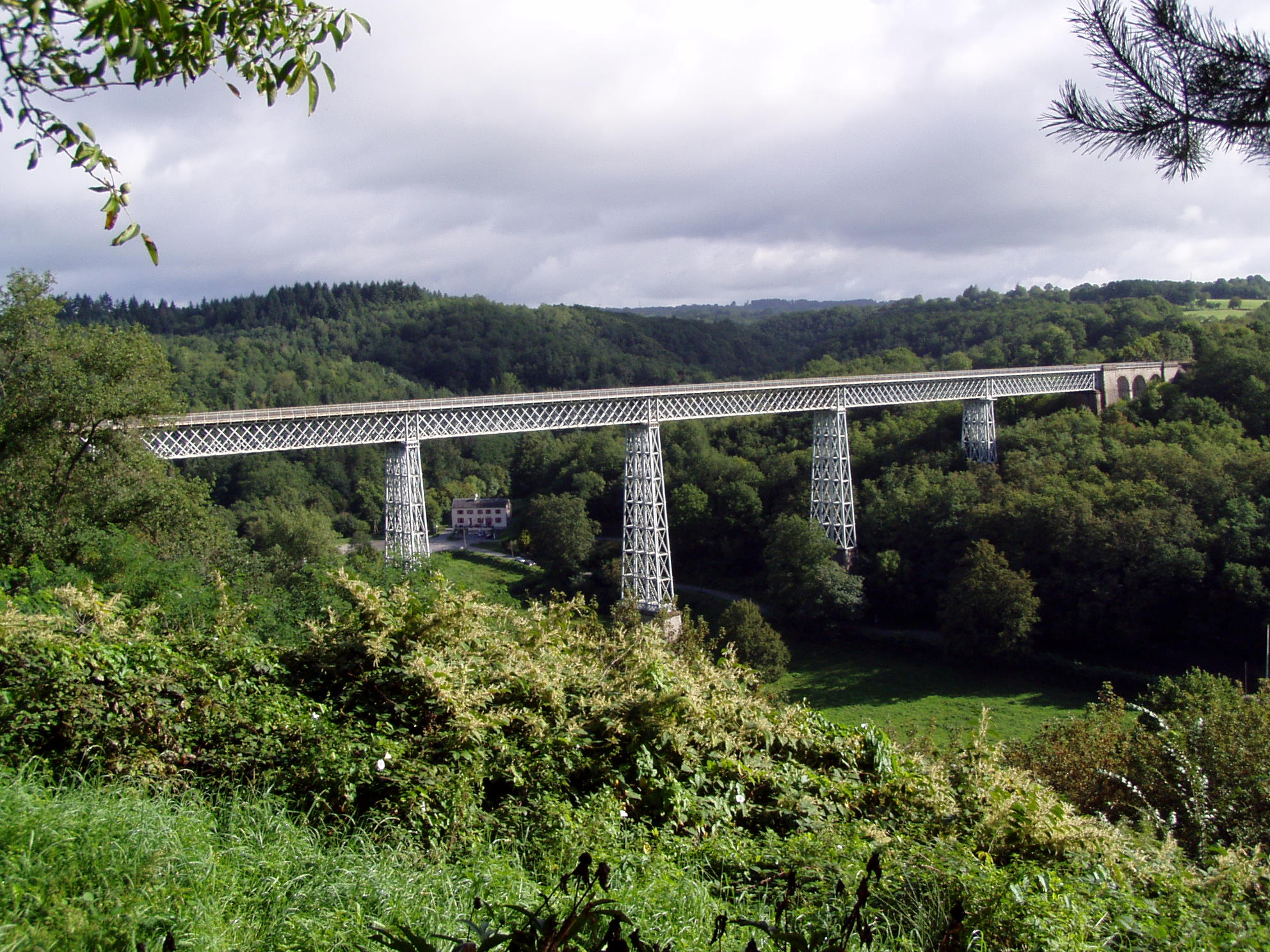
The railway viaduct at Busseau

- The viaduct carrying the railway 57m over the river, built by Lloyds and Nordling in 1864.
- The church of St.Sylvain, dating from the twelfth century.
- Three fifteenth century chateaux.

== Personalities ==
- Saint Silvanus of Ahun (Silvain), martyred and buried in the village.
- Jean Auclair, politician.

== See also ==
- Communes of the Creuse department
