= Communauté de communes Creuse Confluence =

Federation of municipalities in France

Creuse Confluence
- Communauté de communes
- Interactive map of Creuse Confluence
- Coordinates: 46°22′N 02°14′E
- Country: France
- Region: Nouvelle-Aquitaine
- Department: Creuse
- No. of communes: {{{nbcomm}}}
- Established: 2017
- Area: 985.3 km^{2} (380.4 sq mi)
- Population (2018): 16,589
  - Density: 16.84/km^{2} (43.61/sq mi)

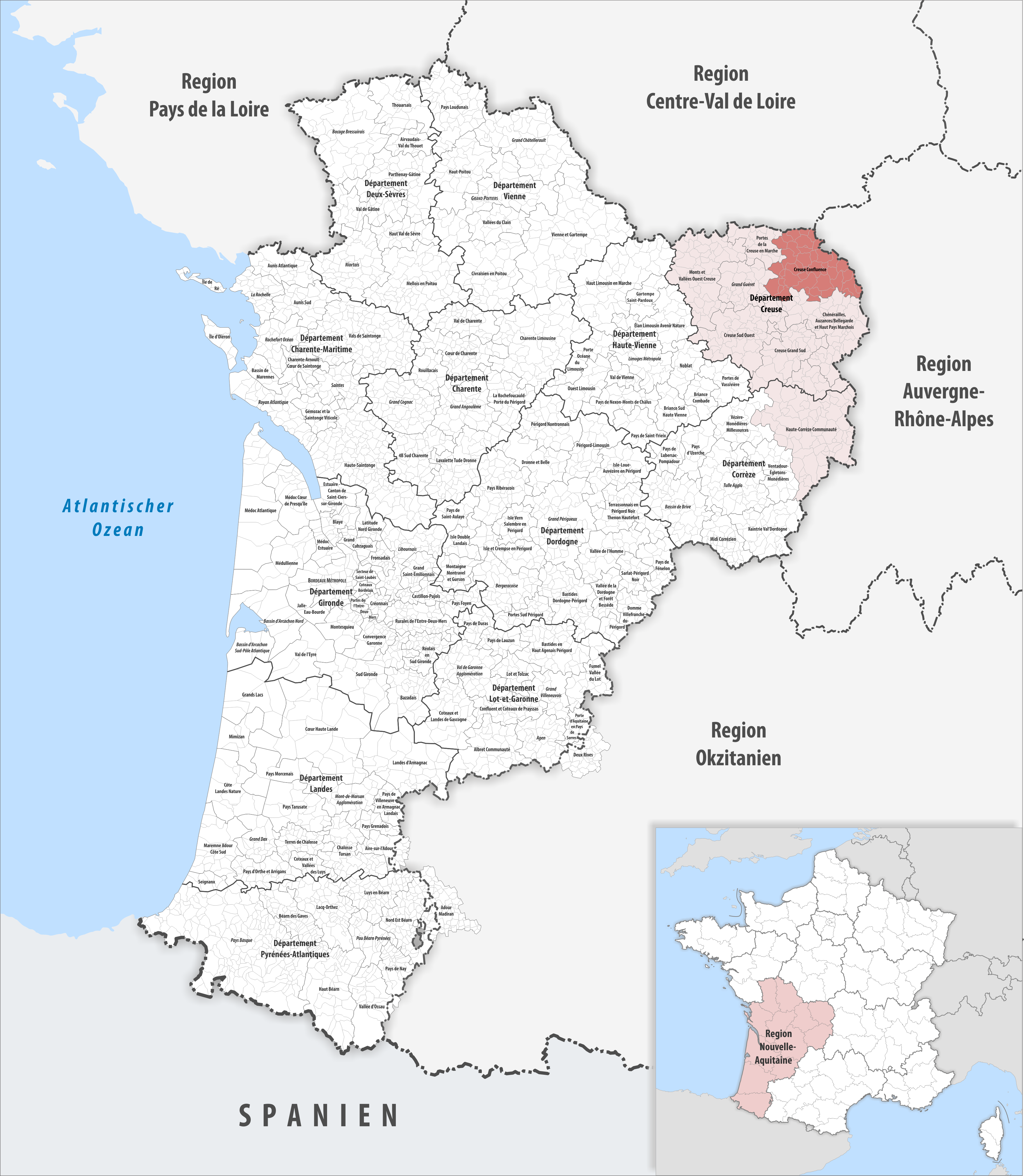

The Communauté de communes Creuse Confluence is a communauté de communes, an intercommunal structure, in the Creuse department, in the Nouvelle-Aquitaine region, central France. It was created in January 2017 by the merger of the former communautés de communes Pays de Boussac, Carrefour des Quatre Provinces and Évaux-les-Bains Chambon-sur-Voueize. Its area is 985.3 km^{2}, and its population was 16,589 in 2018. Its seat is in Boussac-Bourg.

== Communes ==
The communauté de communes consists of the following 41 communes:

1. Auge
2. Bétête
3. Bord-Saint-Georges
4. Boussac
5. Boussac-Bourg
6. Budelière
7. Bussière-Saint-Georges
8. La Celle-sous-Gouzon
9. Chambonchard
10. Chambon-sur-Voueize
11. Clugnat
12. Cressat
13. Domeyrot
14. Évaux-les-Bains
15. Gouzon
16. Jarnages
17. Ladapeyre
18. Lavaufranche
19. Lépaud
20. Leyrat
21. Lussat
22. Malleret-Boussac
23. Nouhant
24. Nouzerines
25. Parsac
26. Pierrefitte
27. Pionnat
28. Saint-Julien-la-Genête
29. Saint-Julien-le-Châtel
30. Saint-Loup
31. Saint-Marien
32. Saint-Pierre-le-Bost
33. Saint-Silvain-Bas-le-Roc
34. Saint-Silvain-sous-Toulx
35. Soumans
36. Tardes
37. Toulx-Sainte-Croix
38. Trois-Fonds
39. Verneiges
40. Viersat
41. Vigeville
