= Canton of Gouzon =

Coordinates: 46.19°N 2.24°E

The canton of Gouzon is an administrative division of the Creuse department, in central France. It was created at the French canton reorganisation which came into effect in March 2015. Its seat is in Gouzon.

It consists of the following communes:

1. La Celle-sous-Gouzon
2. Le Chauchet
3. Chénérailles
4. Cressat
5. Domeyrot
6. Gouzon
7. Issoudun-Létrieix
8. Jarnages
9. Ladapeyre
10. Lavaveix-les-Mines
11. Parsac
12. Peyrat-la-Nonière
13. Pierrefitte
14. Pionnat
15. Puy-Malsignat
16. Saint-Chabrais
17. Saint-Dizier-la-Tour
18. Saint-Julien-le-Châtel
19. Saint-Loup
20. Saint-Médard-la-Rochette
21. Saint-Pardoux-les-Cards
22. Saint-Silvain-sous-Toulx
23. Trois-Fonds
24. Vigeville
