= Petite Creuse =

River in France

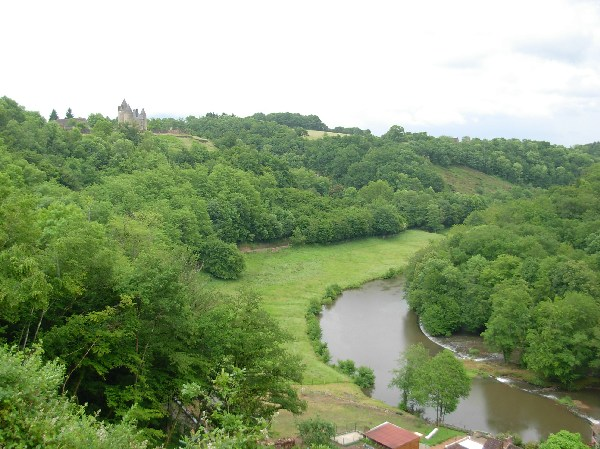

- Location within France Location within Nouvelle-Aquitaine

Location
- Country: France

Physical characteristics
- Source
  - location: In Treignat
  - coordinates: 46°19′41″N 02°21′28″E
  - elevation: 490 m (1,610 ft)
- Mouth
  - location: Creuse
  - coordinates: 46°23′14″N 01°40′17″E
  - elevation: 202 m (663 ft)
- Length: 95.2 km (59.2 mi)
- Basin size: 850 km^{2} (330 sq mi)
- Discharge
  - average: 8.75 m^{3}/s (309 cu ft/s)

Basin features
- Progression: Creuse→ Vienne→ Loire→ Atlantic Ocean

The Petite Creuse (French pronunciation: [pətit kʁøz], Little Creuse) is a 95.2 km (59.2 mi) long river in Allier and Creuse departments, in central France. Its source is at Treignat, 2.5 km (1.6 mi) southeast of the village. It is a left tributary of the Creuse into which it flows at Fresselines. The river is dammed at several locations creating valley lakes that are extensively used for recreation, such as fishing, boating and swimming. The dams are used to generate electricity and to supply water treatment plants providing drinking water to local communities.

== Departments and communes along its course ==
This list ist ordered from source to mouth:

- Allier: Treignat
- Creuse: Soumans, Lavaufranche, Leyrat, Saint-Silvain-Bas-le-Roc, Boussac-Bourg, Boussac, Malleret-Boussac, Clugnat, Bétête, Saint-Dizier-les-Domaines, Genouillac, Moutier-Malcard, Bonnat, Malval, Linard, Chéniers, Lourdoueix-Saint-Pierre, Chambon-Sainte-Croix, Nouzerolles, Fresselines
