= Vigeville =

Commune in Nouvelle-Aquitaine, France

- Commune
- Location of Vigeville
- Location within France Location within Nouvelle-Aquitaine
- Coordinates: 46°09′41″N 2°04′32″E
- Country: France
- Region: Nouvelle-Aquitaine
- Department: Creuse
- Arrondissement: Aubusson
- Canton: Gouzon
- Intercommunality: CC Creuse Confluence

Government
  - Mayor (2020–2026): Laëtitia Massicard
- Area^{1}: 7.27 km^{2} (2.81 sq mi)
- Elevation: 527 m (1,729 ft)
- Highest elevation: 541 m (1,775 ft)
- Lowest elevation: 419 m (1,375 ft)
- Population (2023): 164
  - Density: 22.6/km^{2} (58.4/sq mi)
- Time zone: UTC+01:00 (CET)
  - Summer (DST): UTC+02:00 (CEST)
- INSEE/Postal code: 23262 /23140
- ^{1} French Land Register data, which excludes lakes, ponds, glaciers > 1 km^{2} (0.386 sq mi or 247 acres) and river estuaries.

Vigeville (French pronunciation: [viʒvil]; Occitan: Vijavila) is a commune in the Creuse department in the Nouvelle-Aquitaine region in central France.

== Geography ==
An area of lakes, forestry and farming comprising the village and several hamlets situated some 8 miles (13 km) east of Guéret at the junction of the D4, D13 and the D990 roads.

== Population ==
Historical population
Year	Pop.	±% p.a.
1968	139	—
1975	133	−0.63%
1982	139	+0.63%
1990	145	+0.53%
1999	136	−0.71%
2007	140	+0.36%
2012	169	+3.84%
2017	164	−0.60%
2023	164	+0.00%
Source: INSEE

== Sights ==
The church, dating from the fifteenth century.

Church "without a steeple" boasts an altarpiece and two wooden polychrome statues of the seventeenth century. Walking along the cemetery you can see over the wall a replica of the Eiffel Tower Granite. Presence of a lodging of stage and a cottage in France for all information contact the Town Hall. In the village the hills of the presence of a Tilleu Suly.

== See also ==
- Communes of the Creuse department
