= Pionnat =

Commune in Nouvelle-Aquitaine, France

- Commune
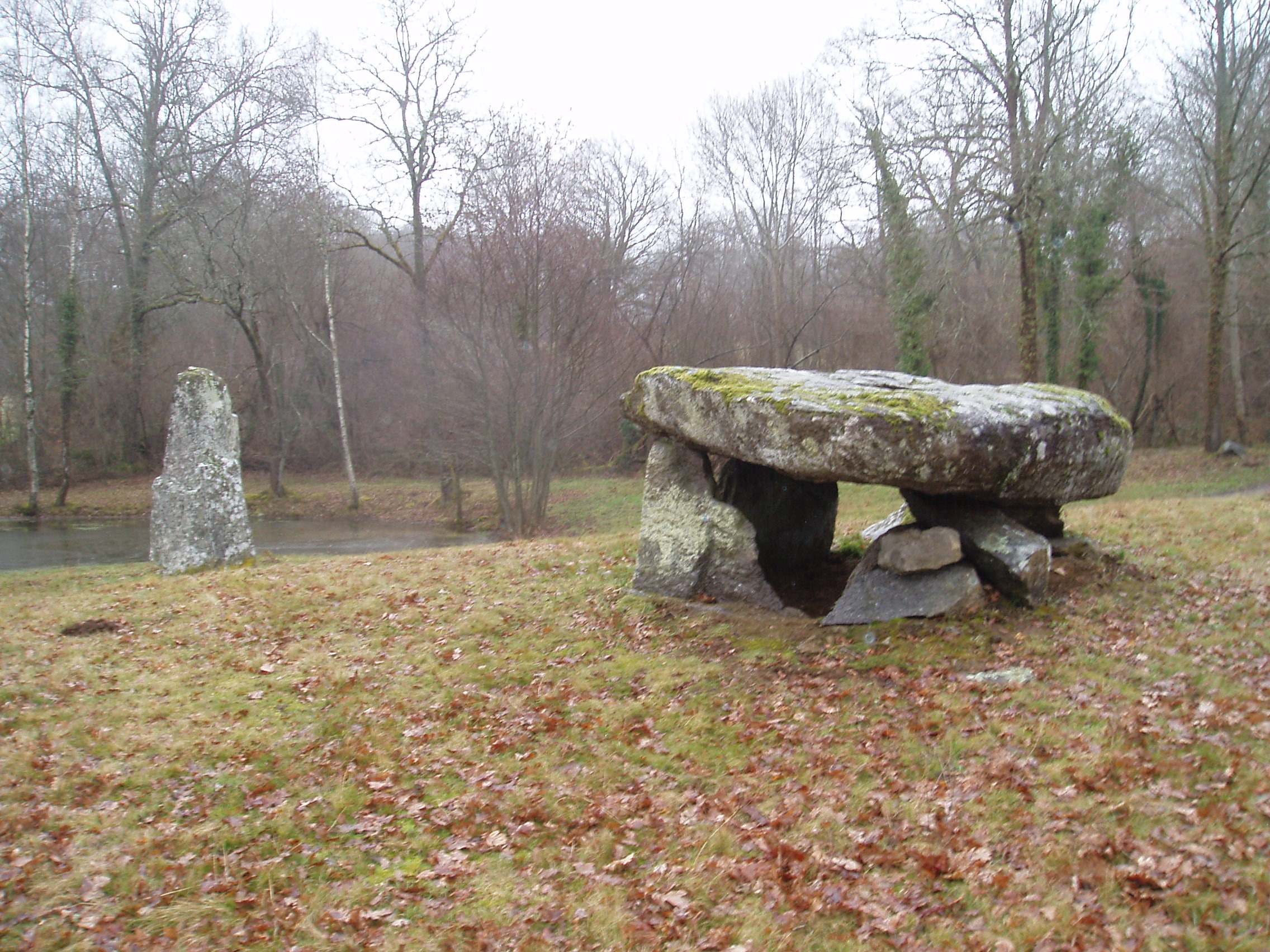
- The megaliths of Ménardeix

- Coat of arms
- Location of Pionnat
- Location within France Location within Nouvelle-Aquitaine
- Coordinates: 46°10′19″N 2°01′34″E
- Country: France
- Region: Nouvelle-Aquitaine
- Department: Creuse
- Arrondissement: Aubusson
- Canton: Gouzon
- Intercommunality: CC Creuse Confluence

Government
  - Mayor (2020–2026): Laurent Piolé
- Area^{1}: 41.77 km^{2} (16.13 sq mi)
- Elevation: 520 m (1,710 ft)
- Highest elevation: 573 m (1,880 ft)
- Lowest elevation: 320 m (1,050 ft)
- Population (2023): 721
  - Density: 17.3/km^{2} (44.7/sq mi)
- Time zone: UTC+01:00 (CET)
  - Summer (DST): UTC+02:00 (CEST)
- INSEE/Postal code: 23154 /23140
- ^{1} French Land Register data, which excludes lakes, ponds, glaciers > 1 km^{2} (0.386 sq mi or 247 acres) and river estuaries.

Pionnat (French pronunciation: [pjɔna]; Occitan: Piònac) is a commune in the Creuse department in the Nouvelle-Aquitaine region in central France.

== Geography ==
A farming area comprising the village and several hamlets situated by the banks of the Creuse, some 8 miles (13 km) east of Guéret, at the junction of the D4, D65 and the D16.

== History ==
During the French Revolution of 1848, some of the villagers were killed in an attempt to seek the release of their friends who were imprisoned for tax evasion.

== Population ==
Historical population
| Year | Pop. | ±% p.a. |
|---|---|---|
| 1968 | 847 | — |
| 1975 | 741 | −1.89% |
| 1982 | 726 | −0.29% |
| 1990 | 682 | −0.78% |
| 1999 | 744 | +0.97% |
| 2007 | 754 | +0.17% |
| 2012 | 754 | +0.00% |
| 2017 | 758 | +0.11% |
| 2023 | 721 | −0.83% |
Source: INSEE

== Sights ==
- The church of St. Martin, dating from the thirteenth century.
- Dolmen and menhir at the hamlet of Ménardeix.
- Two châteaux, at Ternes and at Bosgenêt.
- The viaduct over the Creuse.
- The ancient abbey des Terne.

== See also ==
- Communes of the Creuse department
