= La Celle-sous-Gouzon =

Commune in Nouvelle-Aquitaine, France

- Commune
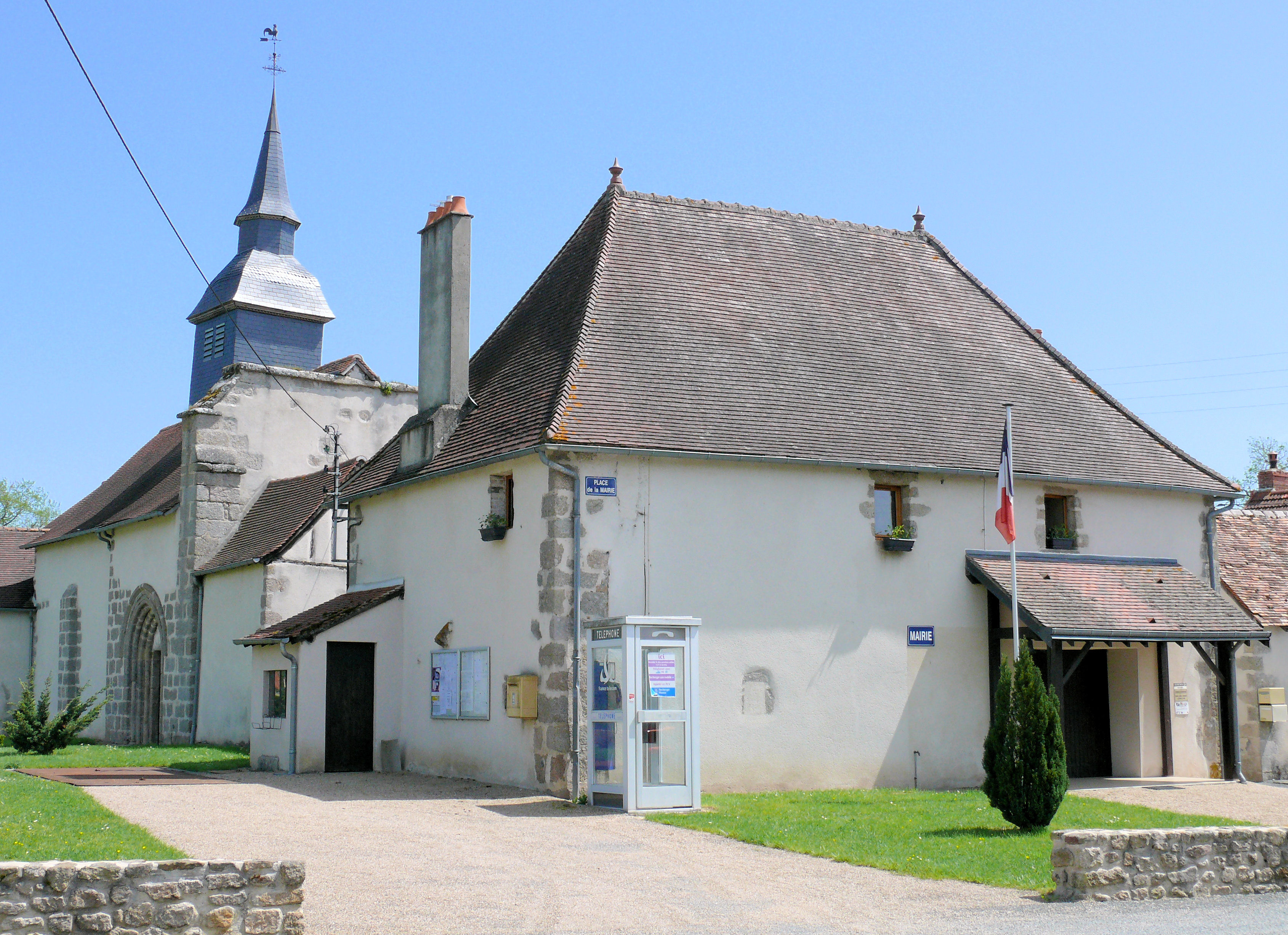
- The town hall and the priory in La Celle-sous-Gouzon
- Location of La Celle-sous-Gouzon
- Location within France Location within Nouvelle-Aquitaine
- Coordinates: 46°12′56″N 2°12′39″E
- Country: France
- Region: Nouvelle-Aquitaine
- Department: Creuse
- Arrondissement: Aubusson
- Canton: Gouzon
- Intercommunality: CC Creuse Confluence

Government
  - Mayor (2020–2026): Michaël Jouanneton
- Area^{1}: 14.07 km^{2} (5.43 sq mi)
- Elevation: 430 m (1,410 ft)
- Highest elevation: 438 m (1,437 ft)
- Lowest elevation: 375 m (1,230 ft)
- Population (2023): 162
  - Density: 11.5/km^{2} (29.8/sq mi)
- Time zone: UTC+01:00 (CET)
  - Summer (DST): UTC+02:00 (CEST)
- INSEE/Postal code: 23040 /23230
- ^{1} French Land Register data, which excludes lakes, ponds, glaciers > 1 km^{2} (0.386 sq mi or 247 acres) and river estuaries.

La Celle-sous-Gouzon (French pronunciation: [la sɛl su ɡuzɔ̃], literally La Celle under Gouzon; Occitan: La Cela de Gosom) is a commune in the Creuse department in the Nouvelle-Aquitaine region in central France.

== Geography ==
A farming area comprising the village and a few small hamlets situated some 16 miles (26 km) east of Guéret on the D40 road.

== Population ==
Historical population
| Year | Pop. | ±% p.a. |
|---|---|---|
| 1968 | 232 | — |
| 1975 | 226 | −0.37% |
| 1982 | 203 | −1.52% |
| 1990 | 162 | −2.78% |
| 1999 | 138 | −1.77% |
| 2007 | 141 | +0.27% |
| 2012 | 134 | −1.01% |
| 2017 | 151 | +2.42% |
| 2023 | 162 | +1.18% |
Source: INSEE

== Sights ==
- The church of St. Pierre and St. Paul, dating from the fifteenth century.

== See also ==
- Communes of the Creuse department
