= Ladapeyre =

Commune in Nouvelle-Aquitaine, France

- Commune
- Location of Ladapeyre
- Location within France Location within Nouvelle-Aquitaine
- Coordinates: 46°14′57″N 2°02′57″E
- Country: France
- Region: Nouvelle-Aquitaine
- Department: Creuse
- Arrondissement: Aubusson
- Canton: Gouzon
- Intercommunality: CC Creuse Confluence

Government
  - Mayor (2020–2026): Dominique Bunlon
- Area^{1}: 30.63 km^{2} (11.83 sq mi)
- Elevation: 425 m (1,394 ft)
- Highest elevation: 528 m (1,732 ft)
- Lowest elevation: 352 m (1,155 ft)
- Population (2023): 360
  - Density: 12/km^{2} (30/sq mi)
- Time zone: UTC+01:00 (CET)
  - Summer (DST): UTC+02:00 (CEST)
- INSEE/Postal code: 23102 /23270
- ^{1} French Land Register data, which excludes lakes, ponds, glaciers > 1 km^{2} (0.386 sq mi or 247 acres) and river estuaries.

Ladapeyre (French pronunciation: [ladapɛʁ]; Occitan: Ladapeira) is a commune in the Creuse department in the Nouvelle-Aquitaine region in central France.

== Geography ==
An area of farming and forestry comprising the village and a few small hamlets situated some 20 miles (32 km) west of Guéret, at the junction of the D11, D990 and the D9 roads.

== Population ==
Historical population
Year	Pop.	±% p.a.
1968	495	—
1975	391	−3.31%
1982	380	−0.41%
1990	336	−1.53%
1999	329	−0.23%
2007	350	+0.78%
2012	360	+0.57%
2017	346	−0.79%
2023	360	+0.66%
Source: INSEE

== Sights ==
- The church, dating from the thirteenth century.
- The fifteenth-century castle de la Dauge.
- The three manorhouses of Le Coudard, La Chassagne and La Côte.
- A large lake, the Etang de Fragne.
- A sixteenth-century stone cross.
- An eighteenth-century public washhouse.

== See also ==
- Communes of the Creuse department
