= Bussière-Saint-Georges =

Commune in Nouvelle-Aquitaine, France

- Commune
- Location of Bussière-Saint-Georges
- Location within France Location within Nouvelle-Aquitaine
- Coordinates: 46°24′03″N 2°08′41″E
- Country: France
- Region: Nouvelle-Aquitaine
- Department: Creuse
- Arrondissement: Aubusson
- Canton: Boussac
- Intercommunality: CC Creuse Confluence

Government
  - Mayor (2020–2026): Gérard Thomazon
- Area^{1}: 22.45 km^{2} (8.67 sq mi)
- Elevation: 461 m (1,512 ft)
- Highest elevation: 498 m (1,634 ft)
- Lowest elevation: 358 m (1,175 ft)
- Population (2023): 262
  - Density: 11.7/km^{2} (30.2/sq mi)
- Time zone: UTC+01:00 (CET)
  - Summer (DST): UTC+02:00 (CEST)
- INSEE/Postal code: 23038 /23600
- ^{1} French Land Register data, which excludes lakes, ponds, glaciers > 1 km^{2} (0.386 sq mi or 247 acres) and river estuaries.

Bussière-Saint-Georges (French pronunciation: [bysjɛʁ sɛ̃ ʒɔʁʒ]; Occitan: Bussiera Sent Jòrge) is a commune in the Creuse department in the Nouvelle-Aquitaine region in central France.

== Geography ==
An area of farming, streams and lakes, comprising the village and several hamlets situated some 22 miles (35 km) northeast of Guéret, at the junction of the D2, D77 and the D98 roads. The commune borders the département of Indre.

== Population ==
Historical population
Year	Pop.	±% p.a.
1968	422	—
1975	355	−2.44%
1982	256	−4.56%
1990	239	−0.86%
1999	184	−2.86%
2007	211	+1.73%
2012	244	+2.95%
2017	256	+0.96%
2023	262	+0.39%
Source: INSEE

== Sights ==
- The church of St. Georges, dating from the twelfth century.

== See also ==
- Communes of the Creuse department
