= Saint-Marien =

Commune in Nouvelle-Aquitaine, France

- Commune
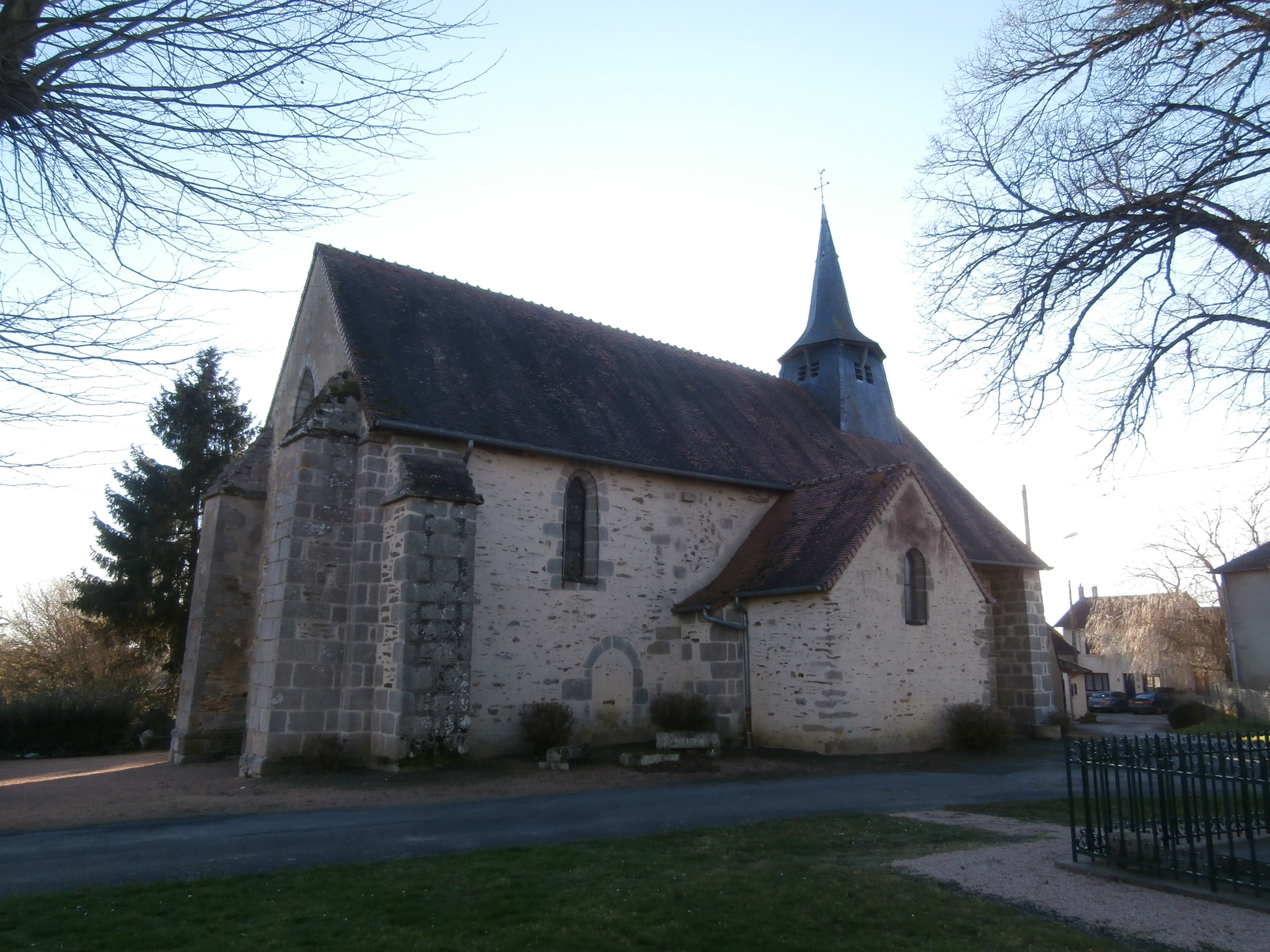
- The church in Saint-Marien
- Location of Saint-Marien
- Location within France Location within Nouvelle-Aquitaine
- Coordinates: 46°25′16″N 2°13′33″E
- Country: France
- Region: Nouvelle-Aquitaine
- Department: Creuse
- Arrondissement: Aubusson
- Canton: Boussac
- Intercommunality: CC Creuse Confluence

Government
  - Mayor (2020–2026): Thierry Briault
- Area^{1}: 12.78 km^{2} (4.93 sq mi)
- Elevation: 464 m (1,522 ft)
- Highest elevation: 502 m (1,647 ft)
- Lowest elevation: 412 m (1,352 ft)
- Population (2023): 196
  - Density: 15.3/km^{2} (39.7/sq mi)
- Time zone: UTC+01:00 (CET)
  - Summer (DST): UTC+02:00 (CEST)
- INSEE/Postal code: 23213 /23600
- ^{1} French Land Register data, which excludes lakes, ponds, glaciers > 1 km^{2} (0.386 sq mi or 247 acres) and river estuaries.

Saint-Marien (French pronunciation: [sɛ̃ maʁjɛ̃]; Occitan: Sent Marien) is a commune in the Creuse department in central France.

== Population ==
Historical population
Year	Pop.	±% p.a.
1968	354	—
1975	304	−2.15%
1982	262	−2.10%
1990	232	−1.51%
1999	186	−2.43%
2007	174	−0.83%
2012	192	+1.99%
2017	185	−0.74%
2023	196	+0.97%
Source: INSEE

== See also ==
- Communes of the Creuse department
