= Saint-Pierre-le-Bost =

Commune in Nouvelle-Aquitaine, France

- Commune
- Location of Saint-Pierre-le-Bost
- Location within France Location within Nouvelle-Aquitaine
- Coordinates: 46°24′05″N 2°15′40″E
- Country: France
- Region: Nouvelle-Aquitaine
- Department: Creuse
- Arrondissement: Aubusson
- Canton: Boussac
- Intercommunality: CC Creuse Confluence

Government
  - Mayor (2020–2026): Coralie Buchet
- Area^{1}: 17.24 km^{2} (6.66 sq mi)
- Elevation: 492 m (1,614 ft)
- Highest elevation: 501 m (1,644 ft)
- Lowest elevation: 400 m (1,300 ft)
- Population (2023): 119
  - Density: 6.90/km^{2} (17.9/sq mi)
- Time zone: UTC+01:00 (CET)
  - Summer (DST): UTC+02:00 (CEST)
- INSEE/Postal code: 23233 /23600
- ^{1} French Land Register data, which excludes lakes, ponds, glaciers > 1 km^{2} (0.386 sq mi or 247 acres) and river estuaries.

Saint-Pierre-le-Bost (Auvergnat: Sent Peir dau Bòsc) is a commune in the Creuse department in central France.

== Population ==
Historical population
| Year | Pop. | ±% p.a. |
|---|---|---|
| 1968 | 301 | — |
| 1975 | 221 | −4.32% |
| 1982 | 183 | −2.66% |
| 1990 | 165 | −1.29% |
| 1999 | 156 | −0.62% |
| 2007 | 153 | −0.24% |
| 2012 | 142 | −1.48% |
| 2017 | 129 | −1.90% |
| 2023 | 119 | −1.34% |
Source: INSEE

== See also ==
- Communes of the Creuse department
