= Malleret-Boussac =

Commune in Nouvelle-Aquitaine, France

- Commune
- Location of Malleret-Boussac
- Location within France Location within Nouvelle-Aquitaine
- Coordinates: 46°20′37″N 2°08′38″E
- Country: France
- Region: Nouvelle-Aquitaine
- Department: Creuse
- Arrondissement: Aubusson
- Canton: Boussac
- Intercommunality: CC Creuse Confluence

Government
  - Mayor (2020–2026): Wladimir Lasareff
- Area^{1}: 25.43 km^{2} (9.82 sq mi)
- Elevation: 300 m (980 ft)
- Highest elevation: 443 m (1,453 ft)
- Lowest elevation: 298 m (978 ft)
- Population (2023): 175
  - Density: 6.88/km^{2} (17.8/sq mi)
- Time zone: UTC+01:00 (CET)
  - Summer (DST): UTC+02:00 (CEST)
- INSEE/Postal code: 23120 /23600
- ^{1} French Land Register data, which excludes lakes, ponds, glaciers > 1 km^{2} (0.386 sq mi or 247 acres) and river estuaries.

Malleret-Boussac (French pronunciation: [malʁɛ busak]; Occitan: Malerèt de Boçac) is a commune in the Creuse department in the Nouvelle-Aquitaine region in central France.

== Geography ==
A farming area comprising the village and some small hamlets, situated in the valley of the Petite Creuse river, some 14 miles (23 km) northeast of Guéret at the junction of the D15, D11 and the D77 roads.

== Population ==
Historical population
Year	Pop.	±% p.a.
1968	447	—
1975	350	−3.43%
1982	294	−2.46%
1990	268	−1.15%
1999	229	−1.73%
2007	230	+0.05%
2012	243	+1.11%
2017	193	−4.50%
2023	175	−1.62%
Source: INSEE

== Sights ==
- The church of St. Martin, dating from the twelfth century.
- The Château de Beaufort.
- A Romanesque chapel at Champeix.

== See also ==
- Communes of the Creuse department
