= Bord-Saint-Georges =

Commune in Nouvelle-Aquitaine, France

- Commune
- Coat of arms
- Location of Bord-Saint-Georges
- Location within France Location within Nouvelle-Aquitaine
- Coordinates: 46°15′40″N 2°17′59″E
- Country: France
- Region: Nouvelle-Aquitaine
- Department: Creuse
- Arrondissement: Aubusson
- Canton: Boussac
- Intercommunality: CC Creuse Confluence

Government
  - Mayor (2020–2026): Jean-Baptiste Alanore
- Area^{1}: 32.5 km^{2} (12.5 sq mi)
- Elevation: 538 m (1,765 ft)
- Highest elevation: 475 m (1,558 ft)
- Lowest elevation: 364 m (1,194 ft)
- Population (2023): 368
  - Density: 11.3/km^{2} (29.3/sq mi)
- Time zone: UTC+01:00 (CET)
  - Summer (DST): UTC+02:00 (CEST)
- INSEE/Postal code: 23026 /23230
- ^{1} French Land Register data, which excludes lakes, ponds, glaciers > 1 km^{2} (0.386 sq mi or 247 acres) and river estuaries.

Bord-Saint-Georges (French pronunciation: [bɔʁ sɛ̃ ʒɔʁʒ]; Occitan: Bòrn Sent Jòrge) is a commune in the Creuse department in the Nouvelle-Aquitaine region in central France.

== Geography ==
An area of forestry, farming and lakes comprising the village and several hamlets situated some 20 miles (32 km) northeast of Guéret, at the junction of the D7, D14 and the D55 roads.

The Voueize forms part of the commune's southern border.

== Population ==
Historical population
Year	Pop.	±% p.a.
1968	568	—
1975	528	−1.04%
1982	435	−2.73%
1990	343	−2.93%
1999	336	−0.23%
2007	360	+0.87%
2012	361	+0.06%
2017	353	−0.45%
2023	368	+0.70%
Source: INSEE

== Sights ==
- The church of St. Georges, dating from the fifteenth century.
- A war memorial.

== See also ==
- Communes of the Creuse department
