= Soumans =

Commune in Nouvelle-Aquitaine, France

- Commune
- Coat of arms
- Location of Soumans
- Location within France Location within Nouvelle-Aquitaine
- Coordinates: 46°18′07″N 2°18′27″E
- Country: France
- Region: Nouvelle-Aquitaine
- Department: Creuse
- Arrondissement: Aubusson
- Canton: Boussac
- Intercommunality: CC Creuse Confluence

Government
  - Mayor (2020–2026): Jean-Claude Parniere
- Area^{1}: 36.68 km^{2} (14.16 sq mi)
- Elevation: 420 m (1,380 ft)
- Highest elevation: 497 m (1,631 ft)
- Lowest elevation: 375 m (1,230 ft)
- Population (2023): 611
  - Density: 16.7/km^{2} (43.1/sq mi)
- Time zone: UTC+01:00 (CET)
  - Summer (DST): UTC+02:00 (CEST)
- INSEE/Postal code: 23174 /23600
- ^{1} French Land Register data, which excludes lakes, ponds, glaciers > 1 km^{2} (0.386 sq mi or 247 acres) and river estuaries.

Soumans is a commune in the Creuse department in the Nouvelle-Aquitaine region in central France.

== Geography ==
An area of lakes, quarries and farming, comprising the village and several hamlets situated in the valley of the Petite Creuse river some 20 miles (32 km) northeast of Guéret, at the junction of the D917, D7 and the D64a roads. The commune shares a border with the Allier département.

== Population ==
Historical population
Year	Pop.	±% p.a.
1968	869	—
1975	739	−2.29%
1982	612	−2.66%
1990	540	−1.55%
1999	544	+0.08%
2007	576	+0.72%
2012	607	+1.05%
2017	601	−0.20%
2023	611	+0.28%
Source: INSEE

== Sights ==
- The church, dating from the twelfth century.
- The Château de Bellefaye.
- The thirteenth-century church at Bellefaye.

== See also ==
- Communes of the Creuse department
