= Lavaufranche =

Commune in Nouvelle-Aquitaine, France

- Commune
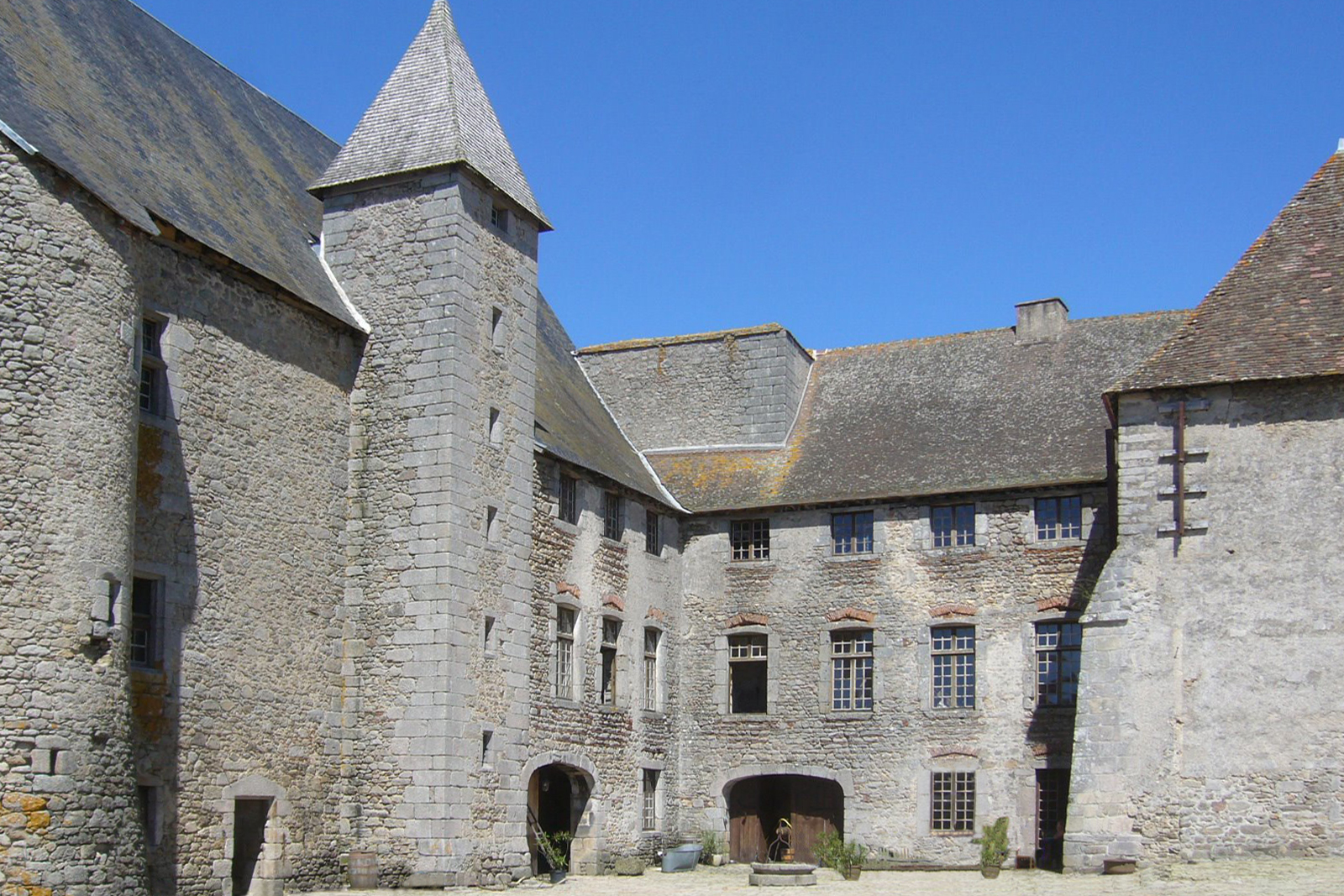
- Commanderie of the Knights of St. John
- Location of Lavaufranche
- Location within France Location within Nouvelle-Aquitaine
- Coordinates: 46°19′17″N 2°16′20″E
- Country: France
- Region: Nouvelle-Aquitaine
- Department: Creuse
- Arrondissement: Aubusson
- Canton: Boussac
- Intercommunality: CC Creuse Confluence

Government
  - Mayor (2020–2026): Patrice Orsal
- Area^{1}: 16.34 km^{2} (6.31 sq mi)
- Elevation: 416 m (1,365 ft)
- Highest elevation: 485 m (1,591 ft)
- Lowest elevation: 375 m (1,230 ft)
- Population (2023): 232
  - Density: 14.2/km^{2} (36.8/sq mi)
- Time zone: UTC+01:00 (CET)
  - Summer (DST): UTC+02:00 (CEST)
- INSEE/Postal code: 23104 /23600
- ^{1} French Land Register data, which excludes lakes, ponds, glaciers > 1 km^{2} (0.386 sq mi or 247 acres) and river estuaries.

Lavaufranche (French pronunciation: [lavofʁɑ̃ʃ]; Occitan: La Vau Francha) is a commune in the Creuse department in the Nouvelle-Aquitaine region in central France.

== Geography ==
A farming area comprising the village and a few small hamlets situated some 20 miles (32 km) northeast of Guéret at the junction of the D7, D917 and the D67 roads. The Petite Creuse river flows through the commune, which is also served by a TER railway.

== Population ==
Historical population
Year	Pop.	±% p.a.
1968	445	—
1975	367	−2.72%
1982	304	−2.65%
1990	231	−3.37%
1999	246	+0.70%
2007	240	−0.31%
2012	248	+0.66%
2017	245	−0.24%
2023	232	−0.90%
Source: INSEE

== Sights ==
- The commanderie of the Knights of Saint John, dating from the twelfth century.
- The twelfth-century chapel.

== See also ==
- Communes of the Creuse department
