= Nouzerines =

Commune in Nouvelle-Aquitaine, France

- Commune
- Coat of arms
- Location of Nouzerines
- Location within France Location within Nouvelle-Aquitaine
- Coordinates: 46°23′21″N 2°06′33″E
- Country: France
- Region: Nouvelle-Aquitaine
- Department: Creuse
- Arrondissement: Aubusson
- Canton: Boussac
- Intercommunality: CC Creuse Confluence

Government
  - Mayor (2020–2026): Valerie Roget
- Area^{1}: 19.09 km^{2} (7.37 sq mi)
- Elevation: 412 m (1,352 ft)
- Highest elevation: 447 m (1,467 ft)
- Lowest elevation: 345 m (1,132 ft)
- Population (2023): 237
  - Density: 12.4/km^{2} (32.2/sq mi)
- Time zone: UTC+01:00 (CET)
  - Summer (DST): UTC+02:00 (CEST)
- INSEE/Postal code: 23146 /23600
- ^{1} French Land Register data, which excludes lakes, ponds, glaciers > 1 km^{2} (0.386 sq mi or 247 acres) and river estuaries.

Nouzerines is a commune in the Creuse department in the Nouvelle-Aquitaine region in central France.

== Geography ==
A farming area comprising the village and a couple of hamlets situated some 18 miles (29 km) northeast of Guéret at the junction of the D2, D68, D83, and the D97 road.

== Population ==
Historical population
| Year | Pop. | ±% p.a. |
|---|---|---|
| 1968 | 529 | — |
| 1975 | 437 | −2.69% |
| 1982 | 340 | −3.52% |
| 1990 | 277 | −2.53% |
| 1999 | 261 | −0.66% |
| 2007 | 252 | −0.44% |
| 2012 | 247 | −0.40% |
| 2017 | 248 | +0.08% |
| 2023 | 237 | −0.75% |
Source: INSEE

== Sights ==
- The eleventh-century church of St.Clair.
- A restored washhouse.
- The Lac de Cluzeau.

== Notable residents ==
- Chris Richardson, Musician
- Jean-Luc Mauger, Peintre

== See also ==
- Communes of the Creuse department
