= Leyrat =

Commune in Nouvelle-Aquitaine, France

- Commune
- Location of Leyrat
- Location within France Location within Nouvelle-Aquitaine
- Coordinates: 46°21′46″N 2°17′36″E
- Country: France
- Region: Nouvelle-Aquitaine
- Department: Creuse
- Arrondissement: Aubusson
- Canton: Boussac
- Intercommunality: CC Creuse Confluence

Government
  - Mayor (2020–2026): Jacques Bonnaud
- Area^{1}: 18.32 km^{2} (7.07 sq mi)
- Elevation: 425 m (1,394 ft)
- Highest elevation: 456 m (1,496 ft)
- Lowest elevation: 372 m (1,220 ft)
- Population (2023): 143
  - Density: 7.81/km^{2} (20.2/sq mi)
- Time zone: UTC+01:00 (CET)
  - Summer (DST): UTC+02:00 (CEST)
- INSEE/Postal code: 23108 /23600
- ^{1} French Land Register data, which excludes lakes, ponds, glaciers > 1 km^{2} (0.386 sq mi or 247 acres) and river estuaries.

Leyrat (French pronunciation: [lɛʁa]; Occitan: Lairac) is a commune in the Creuse department in the Nouvelle-Aquitaine region in central France.

== Geography ==
A farming area comprising the village and a few small hamlets situated some 20 miles (32 km) northeast of Guéret at the junction of the D7, D67 and the D916 roads. The Petite Creuse river flows through the middle of the commune's territory.

== Population ==
Historical population
Year	Pop.	±% p.a.
1968	304	—
1975	243	−3.15%
1982	215	−1.73%
1990	193	−1.34%
1999	175	−1.08%
2007	159	−1.19%
2012	156	−0.38%
2017	146	−1.32%
2023	143	−0.35%
Source: INSEE

== Sights ==
- The church of St. Désiré, dating from the twelfth century.
- The ruins of the chateau of Motte-au-Groing.

== See also ==
- Communes of the Creuse department
