= Domeyrot =

Commune in Nouvelle-Aquitaine, France

- Commune
- Location of Domeyrot
- Location within France Location within Nouvelle-Aquitaine
- Coordinates: 46°15′03″N 2°09′24″E
- Country: France
- Region: Nouvelle-Aquitaine
- Department: Creuse
- Arrondissement: Aubusson
- Canton: Gouzon
- Intercommunality: CC Creuse Confluence

Government
  - Mayor (2020–2026): Daniel Beuze
- Area^{1}: 24.59 km^{2} (9.49 sq mi)
- Elevation: 487 m (1,598 ft)
- Highest elevation: 520 m (1,710 ft)
- Lowest elevation: 333 m (1,093 ft)
- Population (2023): 229
  - Density: 9.31/km^{2} (24.1/sq mi)
- Time zone: UTC+01:00 (CET)
  - Summer (DST): UTC+02:00 (CEST)
- INSEE/Postal code: 23072 /23140
- ^{1} French Land Register data, which excludes lakes, ponds, glaciers > 1 km^{2} (0.386 sq mi or 247 acres) and river estuaries.

Domeyrot (French pronunciation: [dɔmeʁo]; Occitan: Domeiròt) is a commune in the Creuse department in the Nouvelle-Aquitaine region in central France.

== Geography ==
A farming area comprising the village and several hamlets, situated some 12 miles (19 km) northeast of Guéret at the junction of the D40, D13 and the D66 roads. The small river Verraux, a tributary of the Petite Creuse, forms the commune's southern and western boundaries.

== Population ==
Historical population
Year	Pop.	±% p.a.
1968	455	—
1975	365	−3.10%
1982	292	−3.14%
1990	246	−2.12%
1999	215	−1.49%
2007	222	+0.40%
2012	223	+0.09%
2017	225	+0.18%
2023	229	+0.29%
Source: INSEE

== Sights ==
- The church, dating from the seventeenth century.
- The Château de Beaupêche.
- Vestiges of the donjon of a fortified manorhouse at the hamlet of Servières.

== See also ==
- Communes of the Creuse department
