= Saint-Silvain-Bas-le-Roc =

Commune in Nouvelle-Aquitaine, France

- Commune
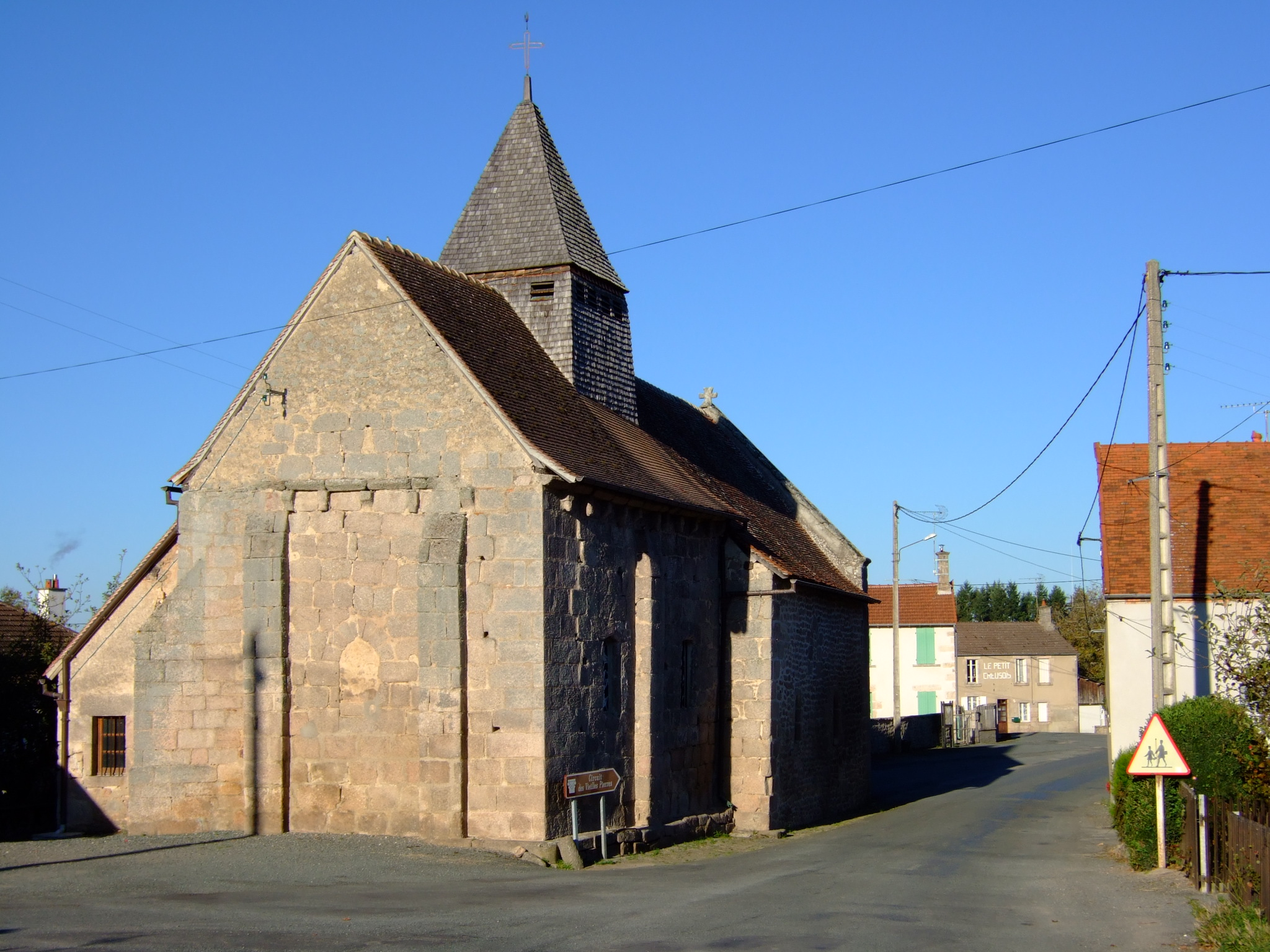
- The church in Saint-Silvain-Bas-le-Roc
- Location of Saint-Silvain-Bas-le-Roc
- Location within France Location within Nouvelle-Aquitaine
- Coordinates: 46°19′55″N 2°13′42″E
- Country: France
- Region: Nouvelle-Aquitaine
- Department: Creuse
- Arrondissement: Aubusson
- Canton: Boussac
- Intercommunality: CC Creuse Confluence

Government
  - Mayor (2020–2026): Patrick Franchaisse'
- Area^{1}: 15.32 km^{2} (5.92 sq mi)
- Elevation: 386 m (1,266 ft)
- Highest elevation: 534 m (1,752 ft)
- Lowest elevation: 310 m (1,020 ft)
- Population (2023): 410
  - Density: 27/km^{2} (69/sq mi)
- Time zone: UTC+01:00 (CET)
  - Summer (DST): UTC+02:00 (CEST)
- INSEE/Postal code: 23240 /23600
- ^{1} French Land Register data, which excludes lakes, ponds, glaciers > 1 km^{2} (0.386 sq mi or 247 acres) and river estuaries.

Saint-Silvain-Bas-le-Roc (French pronunciation: [sɛ̃ silvɛ̃ ba lə ʁɔk]; Auvergnat: Sent Silvan Baish lo Ròc) is a commune in the Creuse department in central France.

== Geography ==
The river Petite Creuse forms all of the commune's northern border.

== Population ==
Historical population
Year	Pop.	±% p.a.
1968	517	—
1975	532	+0.41%
1982	558	+0.68%
1990	527	−0.71%
1999	504	−0.49%
2007	483	−0.53%
2012	500	+0.69%
2017	400	−4.36%
2023	410	+0.41%
Source: INSEE

== See also ==
- Communes of the Creuse department
