= Boussac, Creuse =

Commune in Nouvelle-Aquitaine, France

Boussac
- Commune
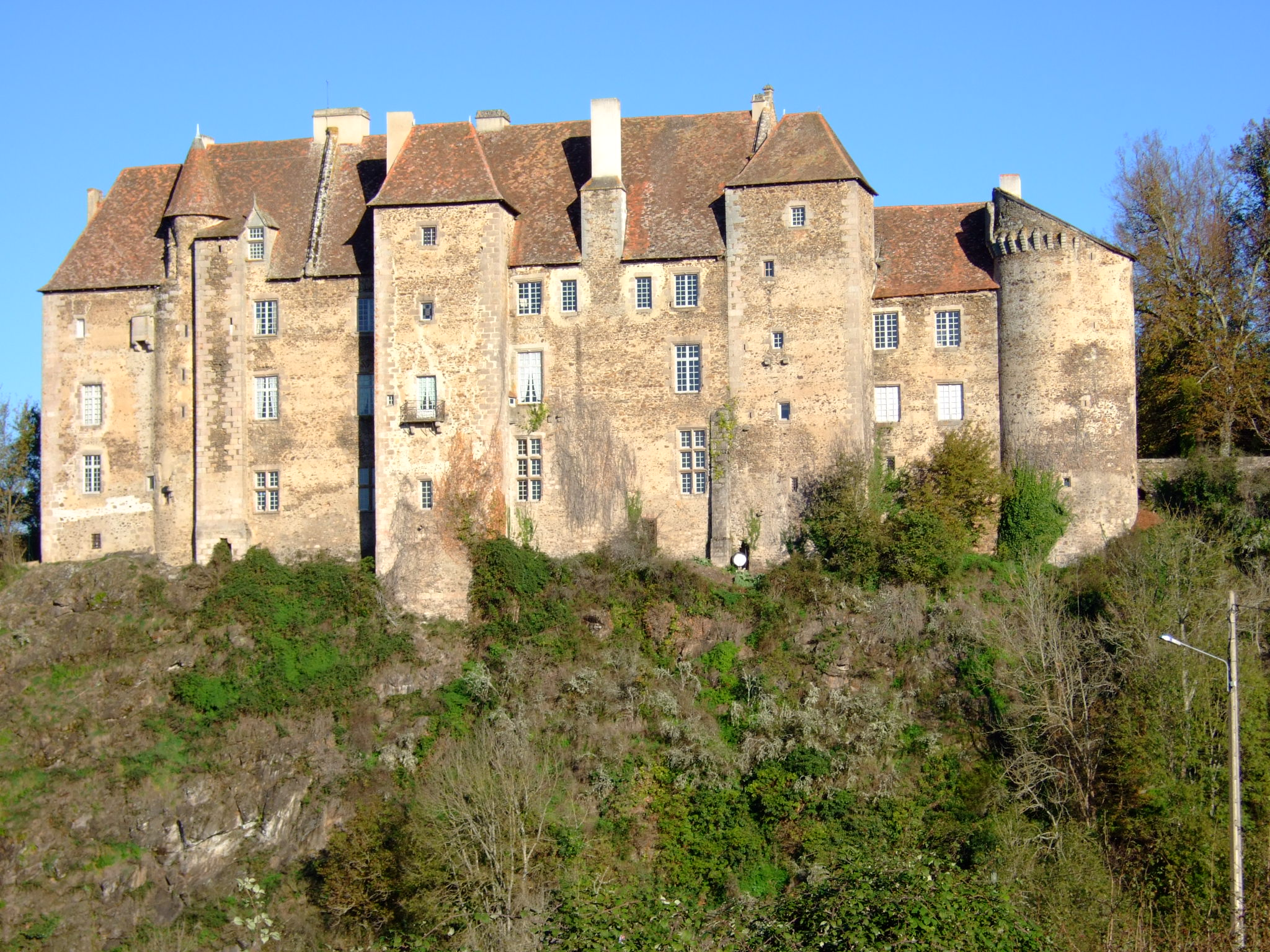
- Chateau

- Coat of arms
- Location of Boussac
- Location within France Location within Nouvelle-Aquitaine
- Coordinates: 46°20′59″N 2°12′56″E
- Country: France
- Region: Nouvelle-Aquitaine
- Department: Creuse
- Arrondissement: Aubusson
- Canton: Boussac
- Intercommunality: CC Creuse Confluence

Government
  - Mayor (2020–2026): Franck Foulon
- Area^{1}: 1.48 km^{2} (0.57 sq mi)
- Elevation: 384 m (1,260 ft)
- Highest elevation: 395 m (1,296 ft)
- Lowest elevation: 335 m (1,099 ft)
- Population (2023): 1,236
  - Density: 835/km^{2} (2,160/sq mi)
- Time zone: UTC+01:00 (CET)
  - Summer (DST): UTC+02:00 (CEST)
- INSEE/Postal code: 23031 /23600
- ^{1} French Land Register data, which excludes lakes, ponds, glaciers > 1 km^{2} (0.386 sq mi or 247 acres) and river estuaries.

Boussac (French pronunciation: [busak]; Occitan: Boçac) is a commune in the Creuse department in the Nouvelle-Aquitaine region in central France. The famous Lady and the Unicorn Tapestries (c. 1500) were discovered in 1841 in Boussac castle. In 1844 the novelist George Sand saw them and brought public attention to the tapestries in her works at the time (most notably in her novel Jeanne), in which she correctly dated them to the end of the fifteenth century, using the ladies' costumes for reference. In 1863 they were bought by the Musée de Cluny in Paris where they are still on display.

== Geography ==
A small light industrial town situated by the banks of the Petite Creuse river, some 25 miles (40 km) northeast of Guéret, at the junction of the D11 and the D997 roads.

== Population ==
Historical population
Year	Pop.	±% p.a.
1968	1,557	—
1975	1,933	+3.14%
1982	1,852	−0.61%
1990	1,652	−1.42%
1999	1,602	−0.34%
2007	1,412	−1.57%
2012	1,300	−1.64%
2017	1,257	−0.67%
2023	1,236	−0.28%
Source: INSEE

== Personalities ==
- Jean de Brosse, Marshal of France, lived and died here
- Pierre Leroux (1797–1871), philosopher, friend of George Sand was mayor here in 1848
- George Sand (1804–1878), set her romance Jeanne here in 1836

== Sights ==
- The church of St. Anne, dating from the fifteenth century
- The twelfth-century castle
- The remains of the old town ramparts
- Several ancient houses and the river bridge, all from the fifteenth century

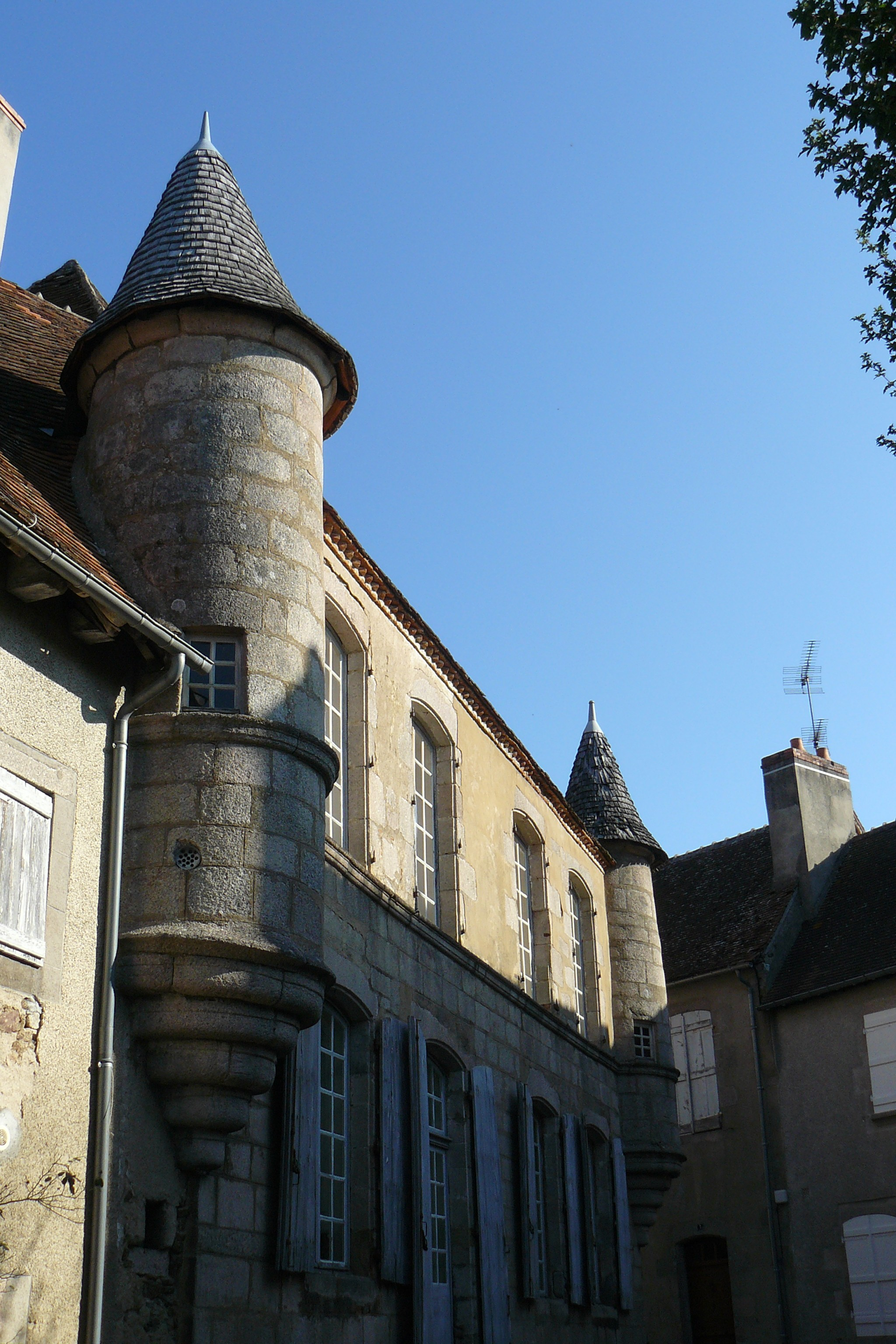
Turreted house

== See also ==
- Communes of the Creuse department
