= Boussac-Bourg =

Commune in Nouvelle-Aquitaine, France

- Commune
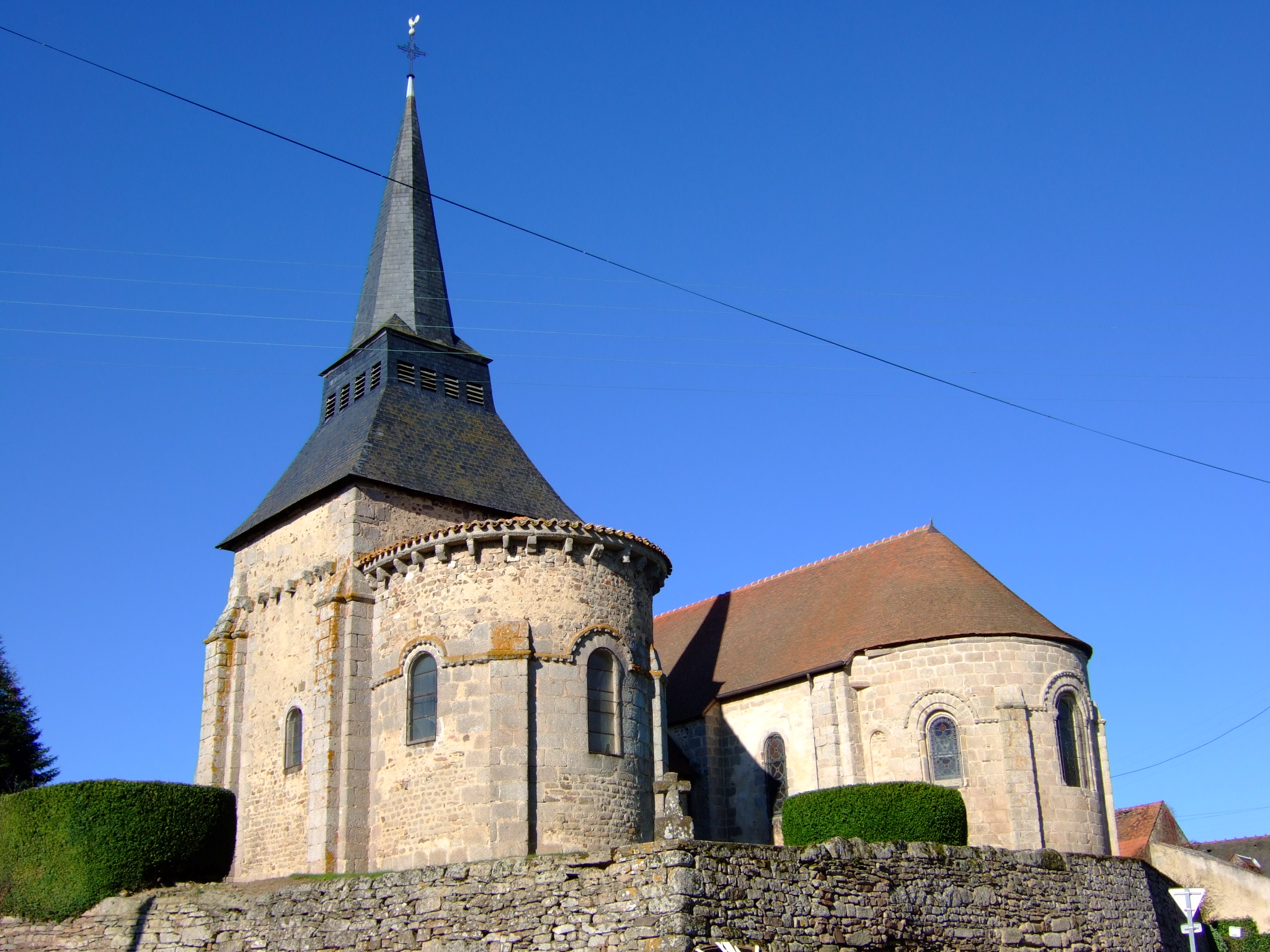
- The church in Boussac-Bourg
- Location of Boussac-Bourg
- Location within France Location within Nouvelle-Aquitaine
- Coordinates: 46°21′43″N 2°14′07″E
- Country: France
- Region: Nouvelle-Aquitaine
- Department: Creuse
- Arrondissement: Aubusson
- Canton: Boussac
- Intercommunality: CC Creuse Confluence

Government
  - Mayor (2020–2026): Hervé Grimaud
- Area^{1}: 38.69 km^{2} (14.94 sq mi)
- Elevation: 425 m (1,394 ft)
- Highest elevation: 499 m (1,637 ft)
- Lowest elevation: 310 m (1,020 ft)
- Population (2023): 686
  - Density: 17.7/km^{2} (45.9/sq mi)
- Time zone: UTC+01:00 (CET)
  - Summer (DST): UTC+02:00 (CEST)
- INSEE/Postal code: 23032 /23600
- ^{1} French Land Register data, which excludes lakes, ponds, glaciers > 1 km^{2} (0.386 sq mi or 247 acres) and river estuaries.

Boussac-Bourg (French pronunciation: [busak buʁ]; Occitan: Boçac Borg) is a commune in the Creuse department in the Nouvelle-Aquitaine region in central France.

== Geography ==
A farming area comprising the village and several hamlets situated in the valley of the small river Béroux, some 23 miles (37 km) northwest of Guéret, at the junction of the D916 and the D997. The Petite Creuse river forms much of the southern border of the commune.

== Population ==
Historical population
| Year | Pop. | ±% p.a. |
|---|---|---|
| 1968 | 887 | — |
| 1975 | 882 | −0.08% |
| 1982 | 892 | +0.16% |
| 1990 | 899 | +0.10% |
| 1999 | 788 | −1.45% |
| 2007 | 789 | +0.02% |
| 2012 | 772 | −0.43% |
| 2017 | 717 | −1.47% |
| 2023 | 686 | −0.73% |
Source: INSEE

== Sights ==
- The two churches, built alongside each other: Notre-Dame and St. Martin, both dating from the eleventh century.
- A rural museum, housed in an old factory.

== See also ==
- Communes of the Creuse department
