= Toulx-Sainte-Croix =

Commune in Nouvelle-Aquitaine, France

- Commune
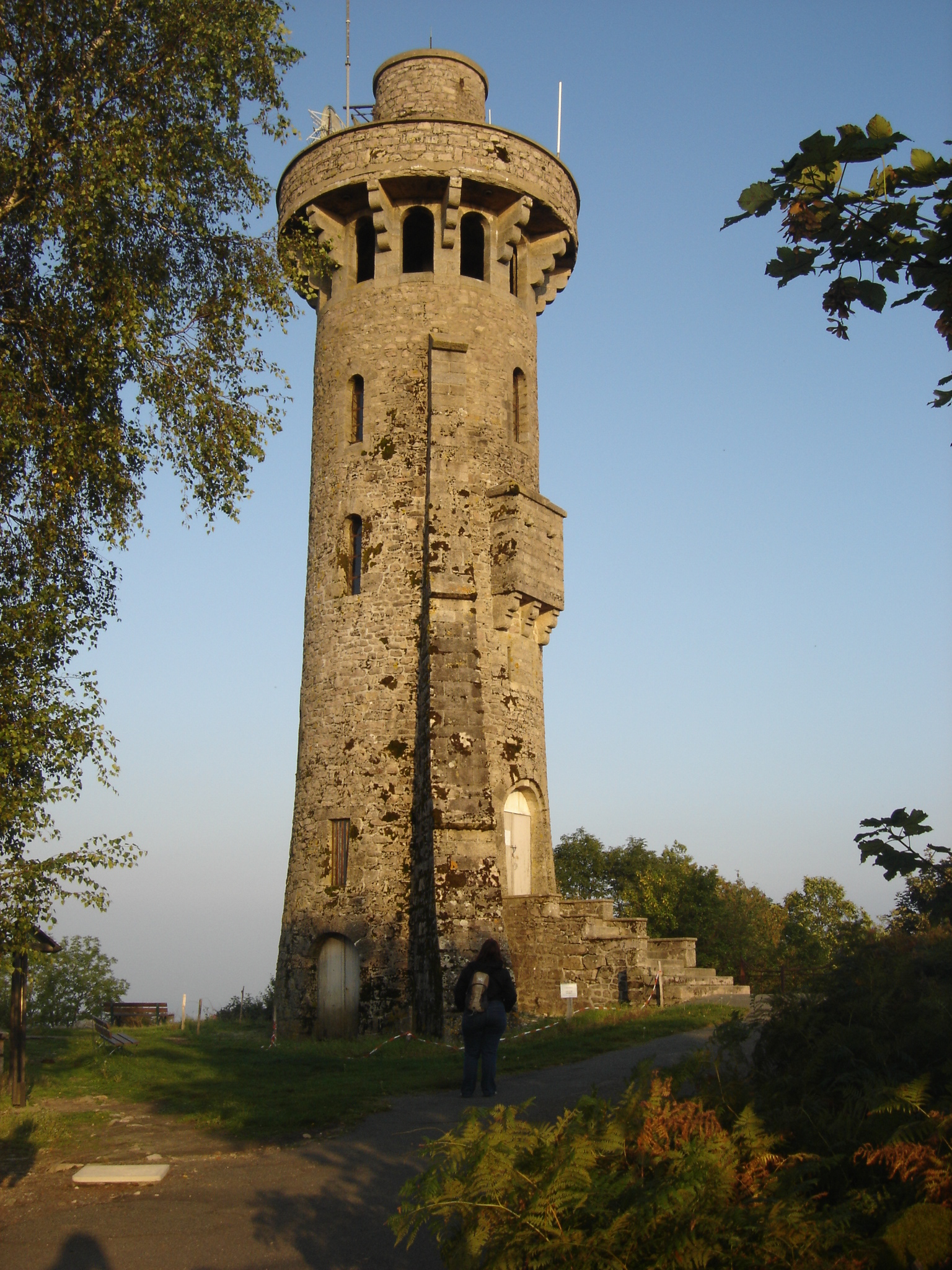
- Observation tower
- Location of Toulx-Sainte-Croix
- Location within France Location within Nouvelle-Aquitaine
- Coordinates: 46°17′08″N 2°12′52″E
- Country: France
- Region: Nouvelle-Aquitaine
- Department: Creuse
- Arrondissement: Aubusson
- Canton: Boussac
- Intercommunality: CC Creuse Confluence

Government
  - Mayor (2020–2026): Christian Julliard
- Area^{1}: 35.05 km^{2} (13.53 sq mi)
- Elevation: 655 m (2,149 ft)
- Highest elevation: 656 m (2,152 ft)
- Lowest elevation: 375 m (1,230 ft)
- Population (2023): 252
  - Density: 7.19/km^{2} (18.6/sq mi)
- Time zone: UTC+01:00 (CET)
  - Summer (DST): UTC+02:00 (CEST)
- INSEE/Postal code: 23254 /23600
- ^{1} French Land Register data, which excludes lakes, ponds, glaciers > 1 km^{2} (0.386 sq mi or 247 acres) and river estuaries.

Toulx-Sainte-Croix (French pronunciation: [tul sɛ̃t kʁwa]; Occitan: Tol Senta Crotz) is a commune in the Creuse department in the Nouvelle-Aquitaine region in central France.

== Geography ==
An area of forestry and farming, comprising the village and several hamlets situated some 16 miles (26 km) northeast of Guéret, at the junction of the D67 and the D14 roads.

== Population ==
Historical population
Year	Pop.	±% p.a.
1968	570	—
1975	507	−1.66%
1982	435	−2.16%
1990	361	−2.30%
1999	304	−1.89%
2007	301	−0.12%
2012	288	−0.88%
2017	263	−1.80%
2023	252	−0.71%
Source: INSEE

== Sights ==
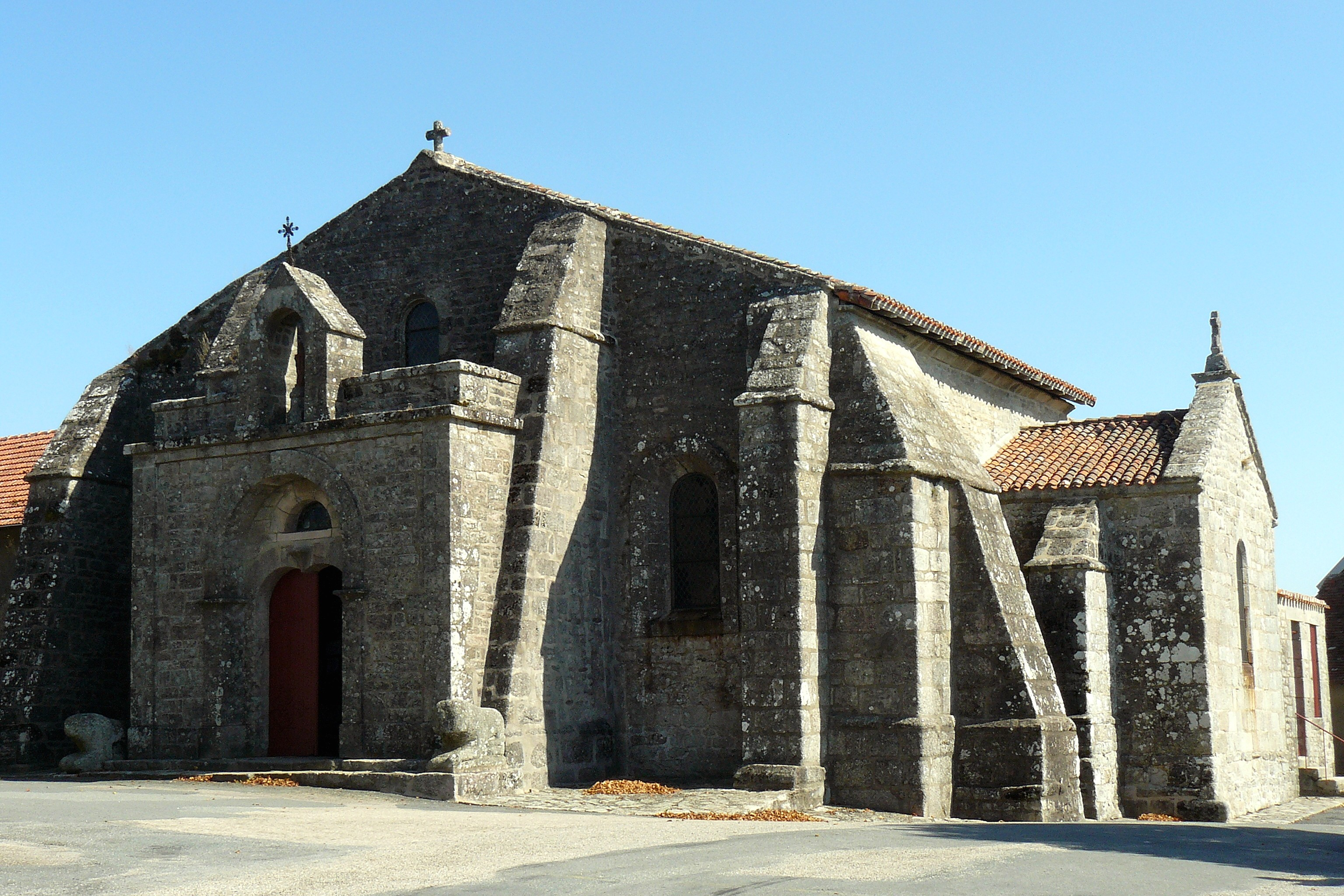
The Romanesque church

- Several Roman remains.
- The church and its separate bell tower, dating from the eleventh century.
- The ancient stone cross on the square.
- Megaliths known as "Les Pierres Jaumâtres".
- A fifteenth-century château at the hamlet of Maisons.
- A fortified manorhouse at Chanon.
- The observation tower constructed in 1932 by Abbé Aguillaume.

== See also ==
- Communes of the Creuse department
