= Trois-Fonds =

Commune in Nouvelle-Aquitaine, France

- Commune
- Coat of arms
- Location of Trois-Fonds
- Location within France Location within Nouvelle-Aquitaine
- Coordinates: 46°15′05″N 2°13′44″E
- Country: France
- Region: Nouvelle-Aquitaine
- Department: Creuse
- Arrondissement: Aubusson
- Canton: Gouzon
- Intercommunality: CC Creuse Confluence

Government
  - Mayor (2020–2026): Madeleine Dumond
- Area^{1}: 9.53 km^{2} (3.68 sq mi)
- Elevation: 470 m (1,540 ft)
- Highest elevation: 482 m (1,581 ft)
- Lowest elevation: 385 m (1,263 ft)
- Population (2023): 141
  - Density: 14.8/km^{2} (38.3/sq mi)
- Time zone: UTC+01:00 (CET)
  - Summer (DST): UTC+02:00 (CEST)
- INSEE/Postal code: 23255 /23230
- ^{1} French Land Register data, which excludes lakes, ponds, glaciers > 1 km^{2} (0.386 sq mi or 247 acres) and river estuaries.

Trois-Fonds (French: [tʁwɑ fɔ̃]; Occitan: Tres Fonts) is a commune in the Creuse department in the Nouvelle-Aquitaine region in central France.

== Geography ==
A small forestry and farming village together with several hamlets, situated some 13 miles (21 km) east of Guéret on the D997 road, north of its junction with the N145.

== Population ==
Historical population
Year	Pop.	±% p.a.
1968	185	—
1975	161	−1.97%
1982	125	−3.55%
1990	85	−4.71%
1999	95	+1.24%
2007	113	+2.19%
2012	119	+1.04%
2017	121	+0.33%
2023	141	+2.58%
Source: INSEE

== Sights ==
- The church, dating from the nineteenth century.

== See also ==
- Communes of the Creuse department
