= Jarnages =

Commune in Nouvelle-Aquitaine, France

- Commune
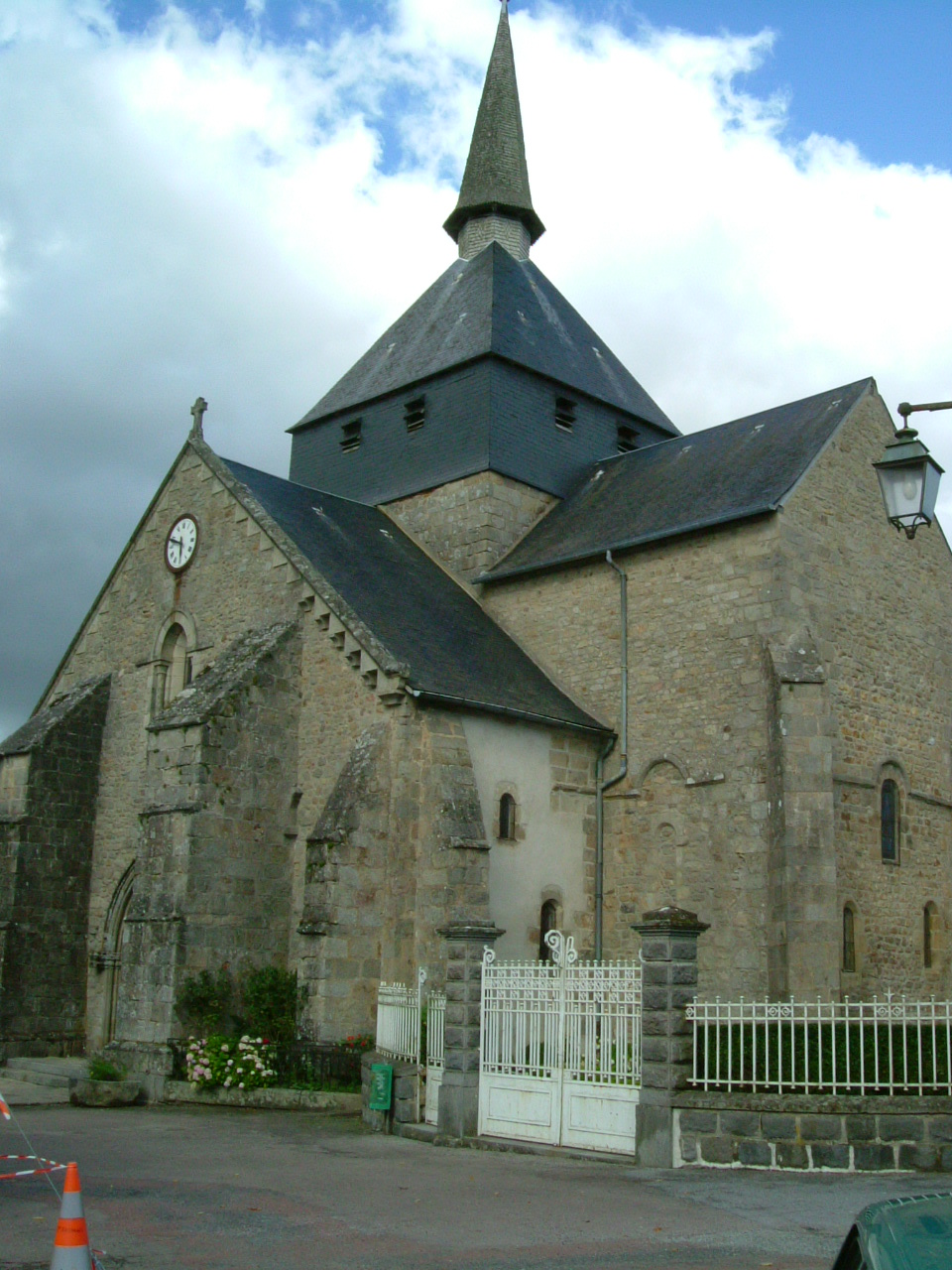
- The church in Jarnages

- Coat of arms
- Location of Jarnages
- Location within France Location within Nouvelle-Aquitaine
- Coordinates: 46°10′56″N 2°05′08″E
- Country: France
- Region: Nouvelle-Aquitaine
- Department: Creuse
- Arrondissement: Aubusson
- Canton: Gouzon
- Intercommunality: CC Creuse Confluence

Government
  - Mayor (2020–2026): Vincent Turpinat
- Area^{1}: 9.17 km^{2} (3.54 sq mi)
- Elevation: 460 m (1,510 ft)
- Highest elevation: 545 m (1,788 ft)
- Lowest elevation: 412 m (1,352 ft)
- Population (2023): 498
  - Density: 54.3/km^{2} (141/sq mi)
- Time zone: UTC+01:00 (CET)
  - Summer (DST): UTC+02:00 (CEST)
- INSEE/Postal code: 23100 /23140
- ^{1} French Land Register data, which excludes lakes, ponds, glaciers > 1 km^{2} (0.386 sq mi or 247 acres) and river estuaries.

Jarnages (French pronunciation: [ʒaʁnaʒ]; Occitan: Jarnajas) is a commune in the Creuse department in the Nouvelle-Aquitaine region in France.

== Geography ==
A farming village situated some 10 miles (16 km) east of Guéret, at the junction of the D65, D13 and the D990. The N145 road forms the northern border of the commune.

== History ==
The origins of Jarnages go back a long way. During the Gallo-Roman period it was known as Agarrusacum. In the Middle Ages, its royal châtelain was Bertrand d'Armagnac, Count de la Marche, who had it fortified in 1434. In the 16th century, Jarnages had a certain importance as a Protestant stronghold, but the Governor of the Marane retook it in 1691.

== Population ==
Historical population
Year	Pop.	±% p.a.
1968	512	—
1975	473	−1.13%
1982	470	−0.09%
1990	449	−0.57%
1999	408	−1.06%
2007	506	+2.73%
2012	501	−0.20%
2017	452	−2.04%
2023	498	+1.63%
Source: INSEE

== Sights ==
- The church of St. Pierre, dating from the twelfth century.

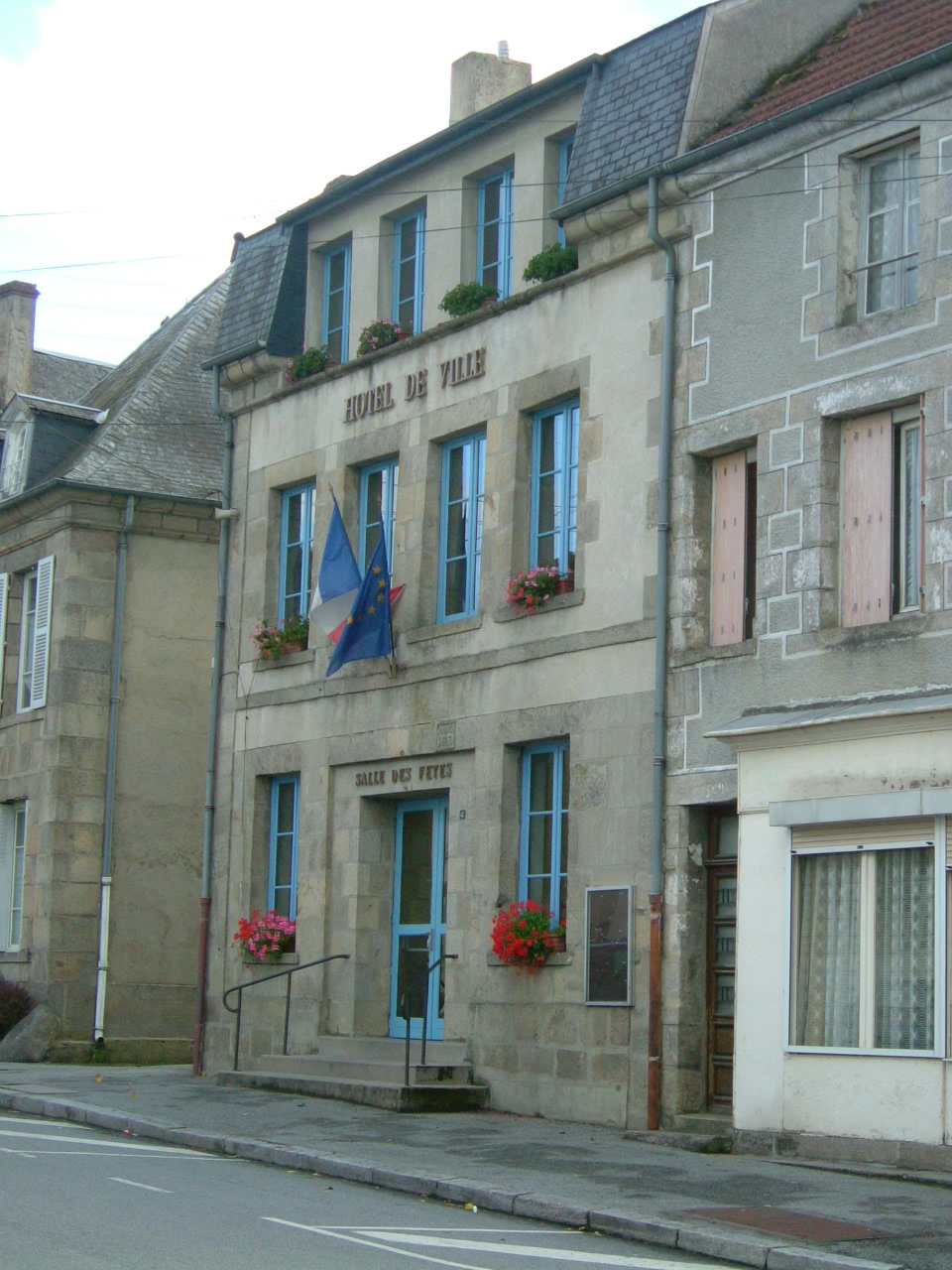
Town hall

== See also ==
- Communes of the Creuse department
