= Communes of the Creuse department =

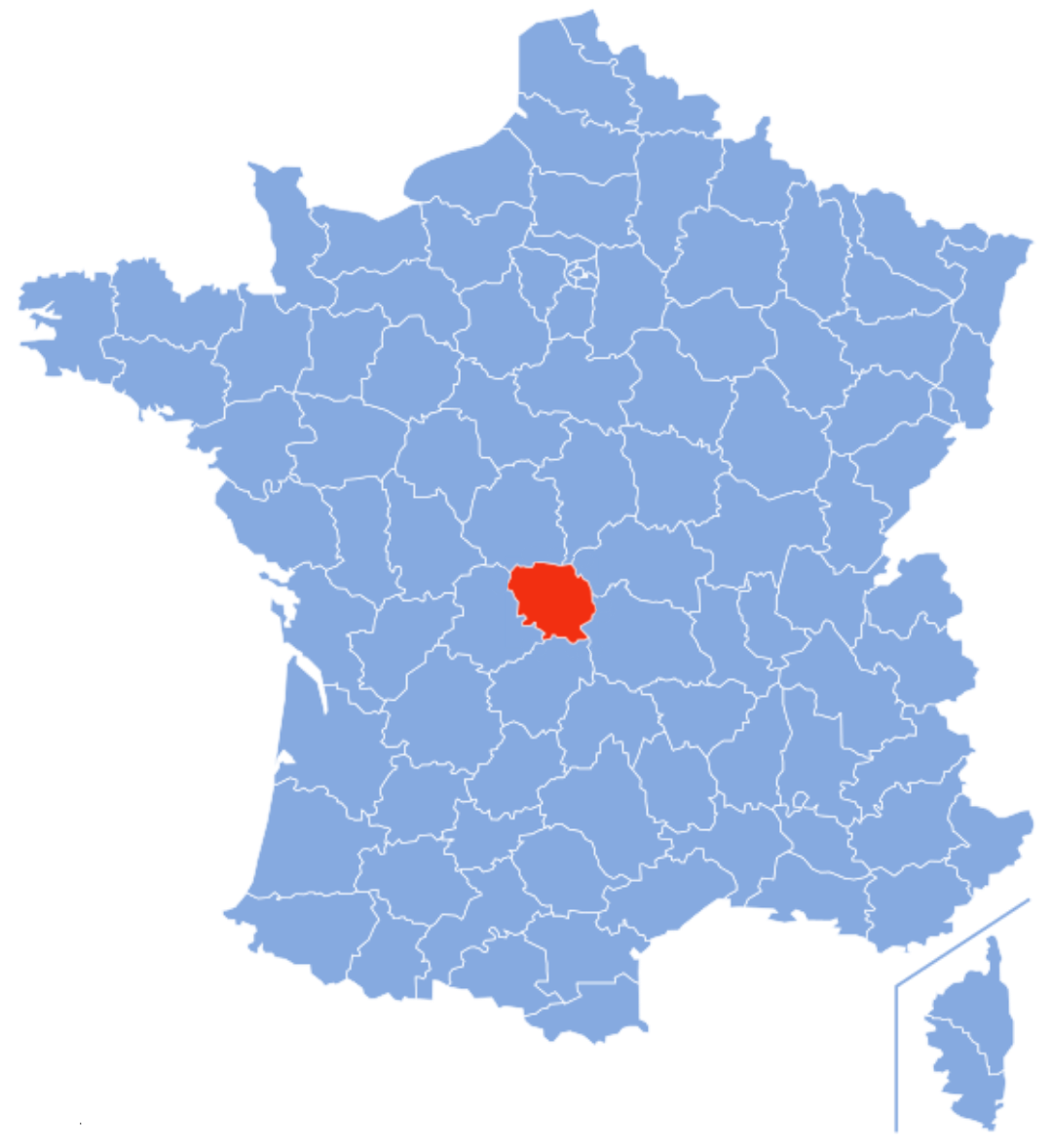

The following is a list of the 255 communes of the Creuse department of France.

The communes cooperate in the following intercommunalities (as of 2025):

- Communauté d'agglomération du Grand Guéret
- Communauté de communes de Bénévent-Grand-Bourg
- Communauté de communes Creuse Confluence
- Communauté de communes Creuse Grand Sud
- Communauté de communes Creuse Sud Ouest
- Haute-Corrèze Communauté (partly)
- Communauté de communes Marche et Combraille en Aquitaine
- Communauté de communes du Pays Dunois
- Communauté de communes du Pays Sostranien
- Communauté de communes Portes de la Creuse en Marche

INSEE	Postal	Commune
23001	23150	Ahun
23002	23380	Ajain
23003	23200	Alleyrat
23004	23000	Anzême
23005	23700	Arfeuille-Châtain
23006	23210	Arrènes
23007	23480	Ars
23008	23200	Aubusson
23009	23170	Auge
23010	23210	Augères
23011	23210	Aulon
23012	23400	Auriat
23013	23700	Auzances
23014	23210	Azat-Châtenet
23015	23160	Azerables
23016	23120	Banize
23017	23260	Basville
23018	23160	Bazelat
23019	23260	Beissat
23020	23190	Bellegarde-en-Marche
23021	23210	Bénévent-l'Abbaye
23022	23270	Bétête
23024	23200	Blessac
23025	23220	Bonnat
23026	23230	Bord-Saint-Georges
23027	23400	Bosmoreau-les-Mines
23028	23200	Bosroger
23030	23400	Bourganeuf
23029	23220	Le Bourg-d'Hem
23031	23600	Boussac
23032	23600	Boussac-Bourg
23033	23000	La Brionne
23034	23700	Brousse
23035	23170	Budelière
23036	23320	Bussière-Dunoise
23037	23700	Bussière-Nouvelle
23038	23600	Bussière-Saint-Georges
23039	23800	La Celle-Dunoise
23040	23230	La Celle-sous-Gouzon
23041	23350	La Cellette
23042	23210	Ceyroux
23043	23480	Chamberaud
23046	23110	Chambonchard
23044	23220	Chambon-Sainte-Croix
23045	23170	Chambon-sur-Voueize
23047	23240	Chamborand
23048	23190	Champagnat
23049	23220	Champsanglard
23050	23160	La Chapelle-Baloue
23051	23250	La Chapelle-Saint-Martial
23052	23000	La Chapelle-Taillefert
23053	23700	Chard
23054	23700	Charron
23055	23700	Châtelard
23056	23430	Châtelus-le-Marcheix
23057	23270	Châtelus-Malvaleix
23058	23130	Le Chauchet
23059	23200	La Chaussade
23060	23250	Chavanat
23061	23130	Chénérailles
23062	23220	Chéniers
23063	23500	Clairavaux
23064	23270	Clugnat
23065	23800	Colondannes
23066	23700	Le Compas
23067	23100	La Courtine
23068	23140	Cressat
23069	23260	Crocq
23070	23160	Crozant
23071	23500	Croze
23072	23140	Domeyrot
23073	23700	Dontreix
23074	23480	Le Donzeil
23075	23800	Dun-le-Palestel
23076	23110	Évaux-les-Bains
23077	23340	Faux-la-Montagne
23078	23400	Faux-Mazuras
23079	23500	Felletin
23080	23100	Féniers
23081	23260	Flayat
23082	23320	Fleurat
23083	23110	Fontanières
23084	23360	La Forêt-du-Temple
23086	23480	Fransèches
23087	23450	Fresselines
23192	23290	Fursac
23088	23320	Gartempe
23089	23350	Genouillac
23090	23340	Gentioux-Pigerolles
23091	23500	Gioux
23092	23380	Glénic
23093	23230	Gouzon
23095	23240	Le Grand-Bourg
23096	23000	Guéret
23097	23130	Issoudun-Létrieix
23098	23270	Jalesches
23099	23250	Janaillat
23100	23140	Jarnages
23101	23220	Jouillat
23102	23270	Ladapeyre
23103	23800	Lafat
23104	23600	Lavaufranche
23105	23150	Lavaveix-les-Mines
23106	23170	Lépaud
23107	23150	Lépinas
23108	23600	Leyrat
23109	23220	Linard-Malval
23110	23700	Lioux-les-Monges
23111	23240	Lizières
23112	23360	Lourdoueix-Saint-Pierre
23113	23190	Lupersat
23114	23170	Lussat
23115	23260	Magnat-l'Étrange
23116	23700	Mainsat
23117	23800	Maison-Feyne
23118	23150	Maisonnisses
23119	23260	Malleret
23120	23600	Malleret-Boussac
23122	23400	Mansat-la-Courrière
23123	23700	Les Mars
23124	23210	Marsac
23125	23100	Le Mas-d'Artige
23127	23190	Mautes
23128	23150	Mazeirat
23129	23260	La Mazière-aux-Bons-Hommes
23130	23360	Méasnes
23131	23420	Mérinchal
23132	23320	Montaigut-le-Blanc

INSEE	Postal	Commune
23133	23400	Montboucher
23134	23460	Le Monteil-au-Vicomte
23136	23220	Mortroux
23137	23210	Mourioux-Vieilleville
23138	23150	Moutier-d'Ahun
23139	23220	Moutier-Malcard
23140	23200	Moutier-Rozeille
23141	23800	Naillat
23142	23200	Néoux
23143	23300	Noth
23144	23500	La Nouaille
23145	23170	Nouhant
23146	23600	Nouzerines
23147	23360	Nouzerolles
23148	23350	Nouziers
23149	23140	Parsac
23150	23000	Peyrabout
23151	23130	Peyrat-la-Nonière
23152	23130	Pierrefitte
23154	23140	Pionnat
23155	23250	Pontarion
23156	23260	Pontcharraud
23157	23250	La Pouge
23158	23500	Poussanges
23159	23130	Puy-Malsignat
23160	23110	Reterre
23162	23270	Roches
23164	23700	Rougnat
23165	23460	Royère-de-Vassivière
23166	23800	Sagnat
23177	23300	Saint-Agnant-de-Versillat
23178	23260	Saint-Agnant-près-Crocq
23179	23200	Saint-Alpinien
23180	23200	Saint-Amand
23181	23400	Saint-Amand-Jartoudeix
23182	23200	Saint-Avit-de-Tardes
23183	23480	Saint-Avit-le-Pauvre
23184	23260	Saint-Bard
23185	23130	Saint-Chabrais
23186	23000	Saint-Christophe
23187	23130	Saint-Dizier-la-Tour
23188	23270	Saint-Dizier-les-Domaines
23189	23400	Saint-Dizier-Masbaraud
23190	23190	Saint-Domet
23193	23000	Sainte-Feyre
23194	23500	Sainte-Feyre-la-Montagne
23191	23000	Saint-Éloi
23195	23000	Saint-Fiel
23196	23500	Saint-Frion
23197	23250	Saint-Georges-la-Pouge
23198	23500	Saint-Georges-Nigremont
23199	23160	Saint-Germain-Beaupré
23200	23430	Saint-Goussaud
23201	23150	Saint-Hilaire-la-Plaine
23202	23250	Saint-Hilaire-le-Château
23203	23110	Saint-Julien-la-Genête
23204	23130	Saint-Julien-le-Châtel
23205	23400	Saint-Junien-la-Bregère
23206	23000	Saint-Laurent
23207	23300	Saint-Léger-Bridereix
23208	23000	Saint-Léger-le-Guérétois
23209	23130	Saint-Loup
23210	23200	Saint-Maixant
23211	23200	Saint-Marc-à-Frongier
23212	23460	Saint-Marc-à-Loubaud
23213	23600	Saint-Marien
23214	23150	Saint-Martial-le-Mont
23215	23100	Saint-Martial-le-Vieux
23216	23460	Saint-Martin-Château
23217	23430	Saint-Martin-Sainte-Catherine
23219	23300	Saint-Maurice-la-Souterraine
23218	23260	Saint-Maurice-près-Crocq
23220	23200	Saint-Médard-la-Rochette
23221	23100	Saint-Merd-la-Breuille
23222	23480	Saint-Michel-de-Veisse
23223	23400	Saint-Moreil
23224	23100	Saint-Oradoux-de-Chirouze
23225	23260	Saint-Oradoux-près-Crocq
23226	23260	Saint-Pardoux-d'Arnet
23228	23200	Saint-Pardoux-le-Neuf
23229	23150	Saint-Pardoux-les-Cards
23227	23400	Saint-Pardoux-Morterolles
23232	23460	Saint-Pierre-Bellevue
23230	23430	Saint-Pierre-Chérignat
23233	23600	Saint-Pierre-le-Bost
23234	23110	Saint-Priest
23235	23300	Saint-Priest-la-Feuille
23236	23240	Saint-Priest-la-Plaine
23237	23400	Saint-Priest-Palus
23238	23500	Saint-Quentin-la-Chabanne
23239	23160	Saint-Sébastien
23240	23600	Saint-Silvain-Bas-le-Roc
23241	23190	Saint-Silvain-Bellegarde
23242	23320	Saint-Silvain-Montaigut
23243	23140	Saint-Silvain-sous-Toulx
23244	23800	Saint-Sulpice-le-Dunois
23245	23000	Saint-Sulpice-le-Guérétois
23246	23480	Saint-Sulpice-les-Champs
23247	23320	Saint-Vaury
23248	23000	Saint-Victor-en-Marche
23249	23460	Saint-Yrieix-la-Montagne
23250	23150	Saint-Yrieix-les-Bois
23167	23110	Sannat
23168	23250	Sardent
23169	23000	La Saunière
23170	23000	Savennes
23171	23700	Sermur
23172	23190	La Serre-Bussière-Vieille
23173	23250	Soubrebost
23174	23600	Soumans
23175	23150	Sous-Parsat
23176	23300	La Souterraine
23251	23170	Tardes
23252	23350	Tercillat
23253	23250	Thauron
23254	23600	Toulx-Sainte-Croix
23255	23230	Trois-Fonds
23257	23120	Vallière
23258	23300	Vareilles
23259	23170	Verneiges
23260	23250	Vidaillat
23261	23170	Viersat
23262	23140	Vigeville
23263	23800	Villard
23264	23340	La Villedieu
23265	23260	La Villeneuve
23266	23260	La Villetelle
