= Saint-Silvain-sous-Toulx =

Commune in Nouvelle-Aquitaine, France

- Commune
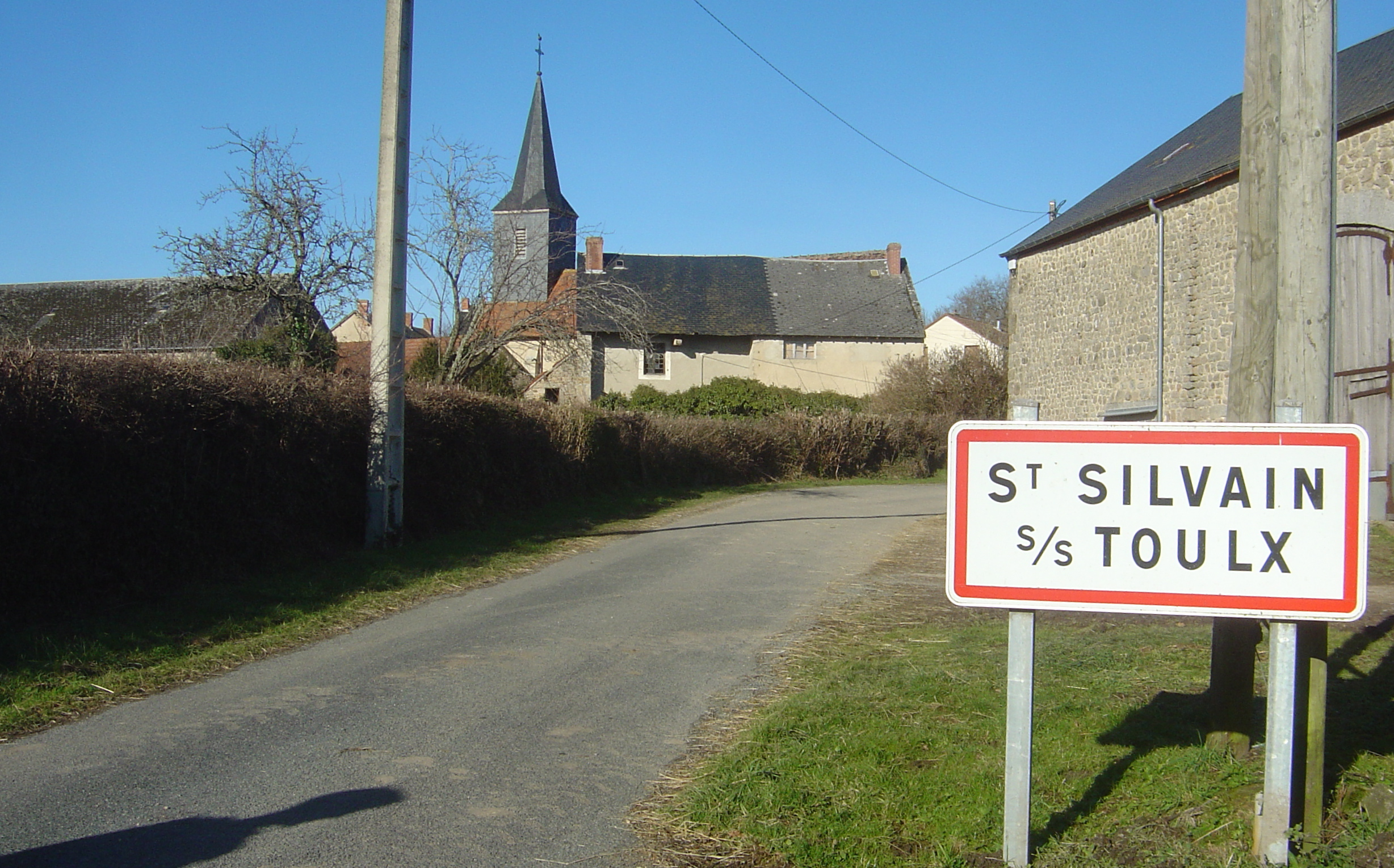
- The road into Saint-Silvain-sous-Toulx
- Location of Saint-Silvain-sous-Toulx
- Location within France Location within Nouvelle-Aquitaine
- Coordinates: 46°15′47″N 2°10′46″E
- Country: France
- Region: Nouvelle-Aquitaine
- Department: Creuse
- Arrondissement: Aubusson
- Canton: Gouzon
- Intercommunality: CC Creuse Confluence

Government
  - Mayor (2023–2026): Isabelle Desforges
- Area^{1}: 14.57 km^{2} (5.63 sq mi)
- Elevation: 500 m (1,600 ft)
- Highest elevation: 625 m (2,051 ft)
- Lowest elevation: 396 m (1,299 ft)
- Population (2023): 146
  - Density: 10.0/km^{2} (26.0/sq mi)
- Time zone: UTC+01:00 (CET)
  - Summer (DST): UTC+02:00 (CEST)
- INSEE/Postal code: 23243 /23140
- ^{1} French Land Register data, which excludes lakes, ponds, glaciers > 1 km^{2} (0.386 sq mi or 247 acres) and river estuaries.

Saint-Silvain-sous-Toulx (French pronunciation: [sɛ̃ silvɛ̃ su tul], literally Saint-Silvain under Toulx; Auvergnat: Sant Sauve de Tol) is a commune in the Creuse department in central France.

== Population ==
Historical population
Year	Pop.	±% p.a.
1968	258	—
1975	211	−2.83%
1982	191	−1.41%
1990	179	−0.81%
1999	163	−1.04%
2007	144	−1.54%
2012	158	+1.87%
2017	165	+0.87%
2023	146	−2.02%
Source: INSEE

== See also ==
- Communes of the Creuse department
