= Gouzon =

Commune in Nouvelle-Aquitaine, France

- Commune
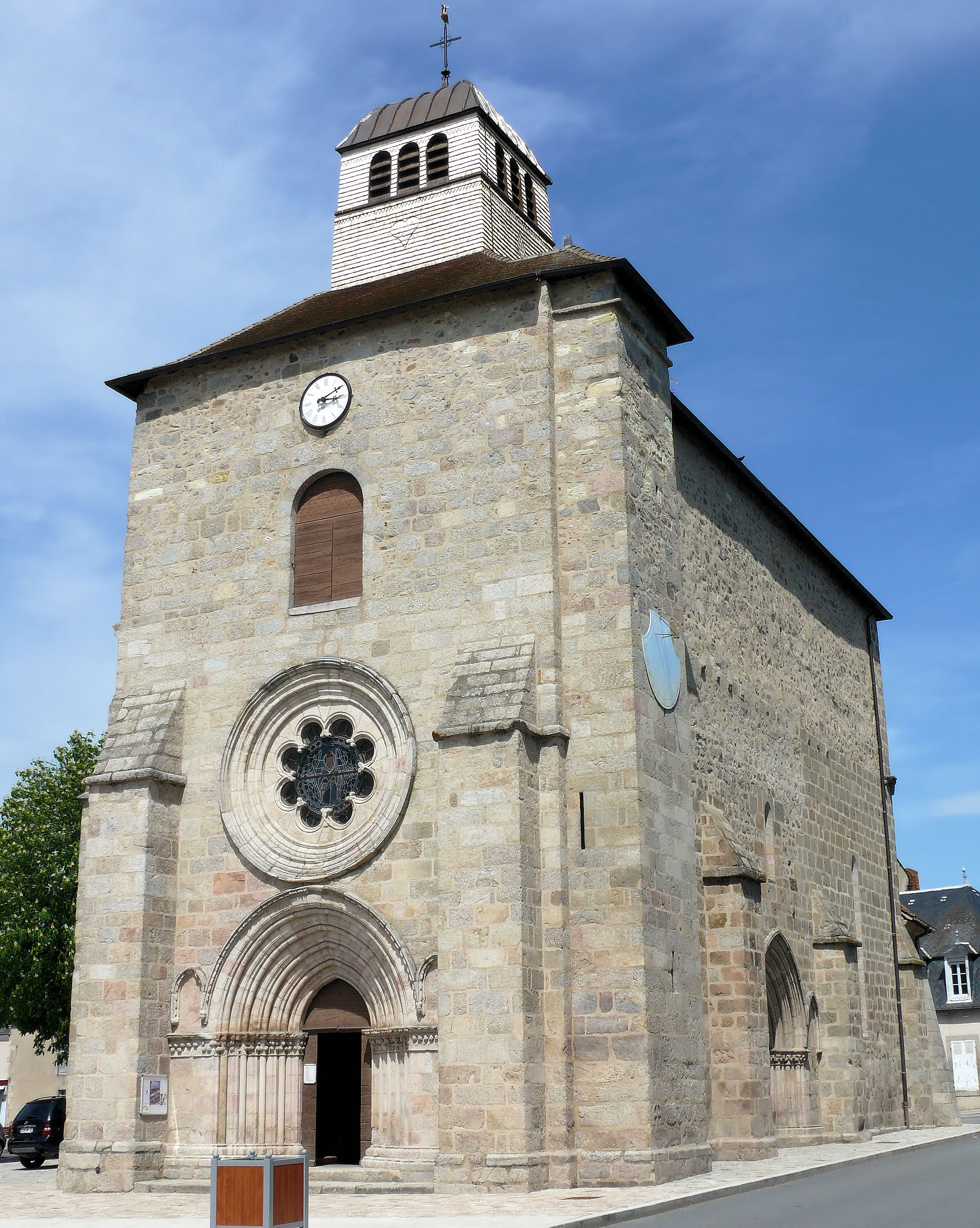
- The church of Saint-Martin, in Gouzon

- Coat of arms
- Location of Gouzon
- Location within France Location within Nouvelle-Aquitaine
- Coordinates: 46°11′33″N 2°14′22″E
- Country: France
- Region: Nouvelle-Aquitaine
- Department: Creuse
- Arrondissement: Aubusson
- Canton: Gouzon
- Intercommunality: CC Creuse Confluence

Government
  - Mayor (2020–2026): Cyril Victor
- Area^{1}: 50.03 km^{2} (19.32 sq mi)
- Elevation: 378 m (1,240 ft)
- Highest elevation: 476 m (1,562 ft)
- Lowest elevation: 366 m (1,201 ft)
- Population (2023): 1,558
  - Density: 31.14/km^{2} (80.66/sq mi)
- Time zone: UTC+01:00 (CET)
  - Summer (DST): UTC+02:00 (CEST)
- INSEE/Postal code: 23093 /23230
- ^{1} French Land Register data, which excludes lakes, ponds, glaciers > 1 km^{2} (0.386 sq mi or 247 acres) and river estuaries.

Gouzon (French pronunciation: [ɡuzɔ̃]; Auvergnat: Gosom) is a commune in the Creuse department in central France. The commune is listed as a Village étape.

== Geography ==
Gouzon is located about 28 kilometres (17 mi) east of Guéret in the Massif Central on the river Voueize, as well as its tributary Goze. The Route nationale 145 (European route E62) passes through the commune. The train station Parsac-Gouzon on the railroad line Montluçon - Saint-Sulpice-Laurière is located in the neighboring commune Parsac-Rimondeix.

== Population ==
Historical population
Year	Pop.	±% p.a.
1968	1,639	—
1975	1,501	−1.25%
1982	1,469	−0.31%
1990	1,370	−0.87%
1999	1,381	+0.09%
2007	1,450	+0.61%
2012	1,542	+1.24%
2017	1,580	+0.49%
2023	1,558	−0.23%
Source: INSEE

The inhabitants are known as Gouzonnais in French.

== Sights ==
- 13th-century church with a shingle-covered steeple.
- Church of St. Nicolas of the Forge (5 km; 3.1 mi) - Some medieval frescos.
- Étang de Grands-Champs – Fly-fishing lake
- Étang des Landes - 120 hectares (300 acres) nature reserve. Bird Observatory

== Economy ==
Gouzon is also a cheese made in the Limousin region.

== See also ==
- Communes of the Creuse département
