= Communauté de communes C.I.A.T.E. du Pays Creuse-Thaurion-Gartempe =

Coordinates: 46.0858°N 2.0446°E

C.I.A.T.E. du Pays Creuse-Thaurion-Gartempe
- Former communauté de communes
- Interactive map of C.I.A.T.E. du Pays Creuse-Thaurion-Gartempe
- Country: France
- Region: Nouvelle-Aquitaine
- Department: Creuse
- No. of communes: {{{nbcomm}}}
- Established: 1994
- Disbanded: 2017
- Population (1999): 8,054

The communauté de communes C.I.A.T.E. du Pays Creuse-Thaurion-Gartempe was located in the Creuse département of the Limousin region of central France. It was created in January 1994. It was merged into the new Communauté de communes Creuse Sud Ouest in January 2017.

It comprised the following 27 communes:

- Ahun
- Banize
- Chamberaud
- La Chapelle-Saint-Martial
- Chavanat
- Le Donzeil
- Fransèches
- Janaillat
- Maisonnisses
- Mazeirat
- Moutier-d’Ahun
- Peyrabout
- Pontarion
- La Pouge
- Saint-Avit-le-Pauvre
- Saint-Éloi
- Saint-Georges-la-Pouge
- Saint-Hilaire-la-Plaine
- Saint-Hilaire-le-Château
- Saint-Martial-le-Mont
- Saint-Michel-de-Veisse
- Saint-Sulpice-les-Champs
- Saint-Yrieix-les-Bois
- Sardent
- Sous-Parsat
- Vidaillat
- Thauron

== See also ==
- Communes of the Creuse department
