= Canton of Pontarion =

Coordinates: 46°00′46″N 1°52′31″E

Pontarion
- Former canton
- Interactive map of Pontarion
- Country: France
- Region: Nouvelle-Aquitaine
- Department: Creuse
- No. of communes: {{{nbcomm}}}
- Disbanded: 2015
- Area: 197.56 km^{2} (76.28 sq mi)
- Population (2012): 2,809
  - Density: 14.22/km^{2} (36.83/sq mi)

The Canton of Pontarion is a former canton situated in the Creuse département and in the Limousin region of central France. It was disbanded following the French canton reorganisation which came into effect in March 2015. It had 2,809 inhabitants (2012).

== Geography ==
A farming area in the arrondissement of Guéret, centred on the village of Pontarion. The altitude varies from 390m (Thauron) to 760m (Vidaillat) with an average altitude of 534m.

The canton comprised 10 communes:

- La Chapelle-Saint-Martial
- Janaillat
- Pontarion
- La Pouge
- Saint-Éloi
- Saint-Georges-la-Pouge
- Saint-Hilaire-le-Château
- Sardent
- Thauron
- Vidaillat

== Population ==
Historical population Canton of Pontarion
Year	1962	1968	1975	1982	1990	1999
Pop.	3,868	4,174	3,650	3,366	2,952	2,821
±%	—	+7.9%	−12.6%	−7.8%	−12.3%	−4.4%
From the year 1962 on: No double counting – residents of multiple communes (e.g. students and military personnel) are counted only once. Source: INSEE

== See also ==
- Arrondissements of the Creuse department
- Cantons of the Creuse department
- Communes of the Creuse department
