= Canton of Guéret-Sud-Est =

Coordinates: 46°09′08″N 1°55′17″E

Guéret-Sud-Est
- Former canton
- Interactive map of Guéret-Sud-Est
- Country: France
- Region: Nouvelle-Aquitaine
- Department: Creuse
- No. of communes: {{{nbcomm}}}
- Disbanded: 2015
- Population (2012): 7,305

The Canton of Guéret-Sud-Est was a canton situated in the Creuse département and in the Limousin region of central France. It was disbanded following the French canton reorganisation which came into effect in March 2015. It had 7,305 inhabitants (2012).

== Geography ==
An area of farming and light industry in the arrondissement of Guéret, centred on the town of Guéret. The altitude varies from 310m (Sainte-Feyre) to 685m (Guéret) with an average altitude of 416m.

The canton comprised 4 communes:

- Guéret (partly)
- La Saunière
- Sainte-Feyre
- Saint-Laurent

== See also ==
- Arrondissements of the Creuse department
- Cantons of the Creuse department
- Communes of the Creuse department
