= Gilbert-Amable Faure =

French Navy officer and politician (1755–1819)

Gilbert Amable Faure-Conac
- Born: 5 April 1755; Vidaillat, Creuse, France
- Died: 14 February 1819 (aged 63); Chénérailles, Creuse, France
- Military career
- Allegiance: First French Empire; Kingdom of France
- Rank: Contre-amiral
- Conflicts: American Revolutionary War French Revolutionary Wars; Napoleonic Wars: Battle of Basque Roads
- Awards: Officier of the Legion of Honour; Chevalier of the Order of Saint Louis

Gilbert-Amable Faure-Conac, (5 April 1755 – 14 February 1819) was a French Navy officer and politician who served in the American Revolutionary War and the French Revolutionary and Napoleonic Wars.

== Life ==
Born the son of Jean-Baptiste Faure, of Fournoux, and Marguerite Rochon, Faure-Conac volunteered for naval service in 1778, serving for three campaigns on Argus, the corvette Sylphide and the frigate Pourvoyeuse, and became sub-lieutenant under Admiral Suffren in the squadron sent to operate against British India during the American Revolutionary War.

He later became naval commander at Pontarion, and after the French Revolution the administrator for Creuse. On 7 September 1792 he was elected by plurality as the alternate deputy to represent Creuse at the National Convention. After the death of Jean-François Guyès, he took his seat on 25 frimaire an II (15 December 1793), where he was occupied exclusively with naval issues, voting to postpone the indictment against Minister of the Navy Jean de Lacoste. By the decree of 30 thermidor an II (17 August 1794), Faure-Conac was sent on a mission with Bernard Thomas Tréhouart to the ports of Brest and Lorient, for which the committee of inspectors allocated 6000 livres on (18 August 1794).

During this mission, they learned from the authorities of Bergen in Norway that French sailors had helped to extinguish a major fire in the city. On 20 frimaire an III (10 December 1794), with his colleague, Faure-Conac sent to the Committee of Public Safety, the 171 decrees made during their trip, which were then redistributed to other committees. Recalled by the degree of 2 ventôse an III (20 February 1795), he was replaced by Julien-François Palasne de Champeaux and Jean-Nicolas Topsent. At the convention, he opposed the plan by Marie-Benoît-Louis Gouly regarding the reorganisation of naval artillery.

Elected by the same department for the Conseil des Cinq-Cents on 21 vendémiaire an IV (13 October 1795) by 151 votes from 218 voters, Faure-Conac was promoted to captain on 22 September 1796, as commander of the frigate Bravoure. On 8 ventôse an V (26 February 1797) he resigned his political position to serve in the Navy. Between 1799 and 1809, he commanded Indivisible, Bravoure, Constitution, and Cassard. On 4 January 1811, he was named commandant of the École de marine de Brest, on board the school-ship Tourville until 1814.

He was made an honorary contre-amiral on 1 January 1816 and retired to Chénérailles.

He was made an officier of the Légion d'honneur and a chevalier de Saint-Louis.
