= Canton of Ahun =

Coordinates: 46°06′56″N 1°59′44″E

Ahun
- Canton
- Interactive map of Ahun
- Country: France
- Region: Nouvelle-Aquitaine
- Department: Creuse
- No. of communes: {{{nbcomm}}}
- Area: 423.88 km^{2} (163.66 sq mi)
- Population (2023): 6,901
  - Density: 16.28/km^{2} (42.17/sq mi)
- INSEE code: 23 01

The Canton of Ahun is a canton situated in the Creuse département and in the Nouvelle-Aquitaine region of central France.

== Geography ==
An area of farming and forestry in the arrondissement of Guéret, centred on the town of Ahun,. The altitude varies from 320 m (1,050 ft) (Pionnat) to 685 m (2,247 ft) (Maisonnisses) with an average altitude of 493 m (1,617 ft).

== Population ==
Historical population
Year	Pop.	±% p.a.
2013	7,099	—
2018	6,997	−0.29%
Source: INSEE

== Composition ==
At the French canton reorganisation which came into effect in March 2015, the canton was expanded from 11 to 27 communes:

- Ahun
- Ars
- Banize
- Chamberaud
- La Chapelle-Saint-Martial
- Chavanat
- Le Donzeil
- Fransèches
- Janaillat
- Lépinas
- Maisonnisses
- Mazeirat
- Moutier-d'Ahun
- Peyrabout
- Pontarion
- La Pouge
- Saint-Avit-le-Pauvre
- Saint-Georges-la-Pouge
- Saint-Hilaire-la-Plaine
- Saint-Hilaire-le-Château
- Saint-Martial-le-Mont
- Saint-Michel-de-Veisse
- Saint-Yrieix-les-Bois
- Sardent
- Sous-Parsat
- Thauron
- Vidaillat

== See also ==
- Arrondissements of the Creuse department
- Cantons of the Creuse department
- Communes of the Creuse department
