= Bernard Thomas Tréhouart de Beaulieu =

- Born: 14 January 1754; 272 years ago
- Died: 12 November 1804; 221 years ago

Bernard Thomas Tréhouart de Beaulieu (French pronunciation: [bɛʁnaʁ tɔmɑ tʁewaʁ də boljø]; 14 January 1754 – 12 November 1804) was a French businessman, major of Saint-Malo, deputy at the National Convention, and Navy officer.

== Career ==
Tréhouart-Beaulieu was born Saint-Malo. In early 1793, he and Jean-Jacques Bréard were in a mission on the coasts of Brest and Lorient, and in Brest with Jean Bon Saint-André, Gilbert-Amable Faure-Conac and Prieur de la Marne. He also served as chief of the first division of the Ministry of the Navy.

Tréhouart-Beaulieu captained the frigate Surveillante in late 1793, ferrying Rear-Admiral Joseph Cambis from New York City to Lorient, as well as other passagers and despatches. He died in Épiniac, aged 50.

== Notes and references ==
=== Bibliography ===
- Fonds Marine. Campagnes (opérations; divisions et stations navales; missions diverses). Inventaire de la sous-série Marine BB4. Tome premier : BB4 1 à 482 (1790–1826)
