= Auriat =

Commune in Nouvelle-Aquitaine, France

- Commune
- Location of Auriat
- Location within France Location within Nouvelle-Aquitaine
- Coordinates: 45°52′27″N 1°38′43″E
- Country: France
- Region: Nouvelle-Aquitaine
- Department: Creuse
- Arrondissement: Guéret
- Canton: Bourganeuf
- Intercommunality: CC Creuse Sud Ouest

Government
  - Mayor (2020–2026): Franck Simon-Chautemps
- Area^{1}: 21.66 km^{2} (8.36 sq mi)
- Elevation: 500 m (1,600 ft)
- Highest elevation: 628 m (2,060 ft)
- Lowest elevation: 376 m (1,234 ft)
- Population (2023): 122
  - Density: 5.63/km^{2} (14.6/sq mi)
- Time zone: UTC+01:00 (CET)
  - Summer (DST): UTC+02:00 (CEST)
- INSEE/Postal code: 23012 /23400
- ^{1} French Land Register data, which excludes lakes, ponds, glaciers > 1 km^{2} (0.386 sq mi or 247 acres) and river estuaries.

Auriat (French pronunciation: [oʁja]; Occitan: Auriac) is a commune in the Creuse department in the Nouvelle-Aquitaine region in central France.

== Geography ==
An area of farming, forests and lakes comprising a small village and several hamlets, situated some 18 miles (29 km) east of Limoges near the junction of the D12, D22 and the D58.

== Population ==
Historical population
Year	Pop.	±% p.a.
1968	241	—
1975	216	−1.55%
1982	180	−2.57%
1990	144	−2.75%
1999	113	−2.66%
2007	123	+1.07%
2012	118	−0.83%
2017	111	−1.22%
2023	122	+1.59%
Source: INSEE

== Sights ==
- The church, dating from the sixteenth century.
- The Château de la Baconnaille.

== See also ==
- Communes of the Creuse department
- Ma Commune Auriat description
