= Communauté de communes Creuse Sud Ouest =

Federation of municipalities in France

Creuse Sud Ouest
- Communauté de communes
- Interactive map of Creuse Sud Ouest
- Coordinates: 46°02′N 01°43′E
- Country: France
- Region: Nouvelle-Aquitaine
- Department: Creuse
- No. of communes: {{{nbcomm}}}
- Established: 2017
- Area: 908.6 km^{2} (350.8 sq mi)
- Population (2018): 13,563
  - Density: 14.93/km^{2} (38.66/sq mi)

The Communauté de communes Creuse Sud Ouest is a communauté de communes, an intercommunal structure, in the Creuse department, in the Nouvelle-Aquitaine region, central France. It was created in January 2017 by the merger of the former communautés de communes CIATE du Pays Creuse-Thaurion-Gartempe and Bourganeuf et Royère-de-Vassivière. Its area is 908.6 km^{2}, and its population was 13,563 in 2018. Its seat is in Saint-Dizier-Masbaraud.

== Communes ==
The communauté de communes consists of the following 43 communes:

1. Ahun
2. Ars
3. Auriat
4. Banize
5. Bosmoreau-les-Mines
6. Bourganeuf
7. Chamberaud
8. La Chapelle-Saint-Martial
9. Chavanat
10. Le Donzeil
11. Faux-Mazuras
12. Fransèches
13. Janaillat
14. Lépinas
15. Maisonnisses
16. Mansat-la-Courrière
17. Montboucher
18. Le Monteil-au-Vicomte
19. Moutier-d'Ahun
20. Pontarion
21. La Pouge
22. Royère-de-Vassivière
23. Saint-Amand-Jartoudeix
24. Saint-Avit-le-Pauvre
25. Saint-Dizier-Masbaraud
26. Saint-Georges-la-Pouge
27. Saint-Hilaire-la-Plaine
28. Saint-Hilaire-le-Château
29. Saint-Junien-la-Bregère
30. Saint-Martial-le-Mont
31. Saint-Martin-Château
32. Saint-Martin-Sainte-Catherine
33. Saint-Michel-de-Veisse
34. Saint-Moreil
35. Saint-Pardoux-Morterolles
36. Saint-Pierre-Bellevue
37. Saint-Pierre-Chérignat
38. Saint-Priest-Palus
39. Sardent
40. Soubrebost
41. Sous-Parsat
42. Thauron
43. Vidaillat
