= Saint-Priest-Palus =

Commune in Nouvelle-Aquitaine, France

- Commune
- Location of Saint-Priest-Palus
- Location within France Location within Nouvelle-Aquitaine
- Coordinates: 45°53′56″N 1°39′32″E
- Country: France
- Region: Nouvelle-Aquitaine
- Department: Creuse
- Arrondissement: Guéret
- Canton: Bourganeuf
- Intercommunality: CC Creuse Sud Ouest

Government
  - Mayor (2020–2026): Patrick Trousset
- Area^{1}: 10.64 km^{2} (4.11 sq mi)
- Elevation: 430 m (1,410 ft)
- Highest elevation: 628 m (2,060 ft)
- Lowest elevation: 412 m (1,352 ft)
- Population (2023): 51
  - Density: 4.8/km^{2} (12/sq mi)
- Time zone: UTC+01:00 (CET)
  - Summer (DST): UTC+02:00 (CEST)
- INSEE/Postal code: 23237 /23400
- ^{1} French Land Register data, which excludes lakes, ponds, glaciers > 1 km^{2} (0.386 sq mi or 247 acres) and river estuaries.

Saint-Priest-Palus (Occitan: Sant Preste Palus) is a commune in the Creuse department in central France.

== Population ==
Historical population
Year	Pop.	±% p.a.
1968	94	—
1975	72	−3.74%
1982	71	−0.20%
1990	58	−2.50%
1999	40	−4.04%
2007	45	+1.48%
2012	46	+0.44%
2017	55	+3.64%
2023	51	−1.25%
Source: INSEE

== See also ==
- Communes of the Creuse department
