= François Tristan l'Hermite =

French dramatist

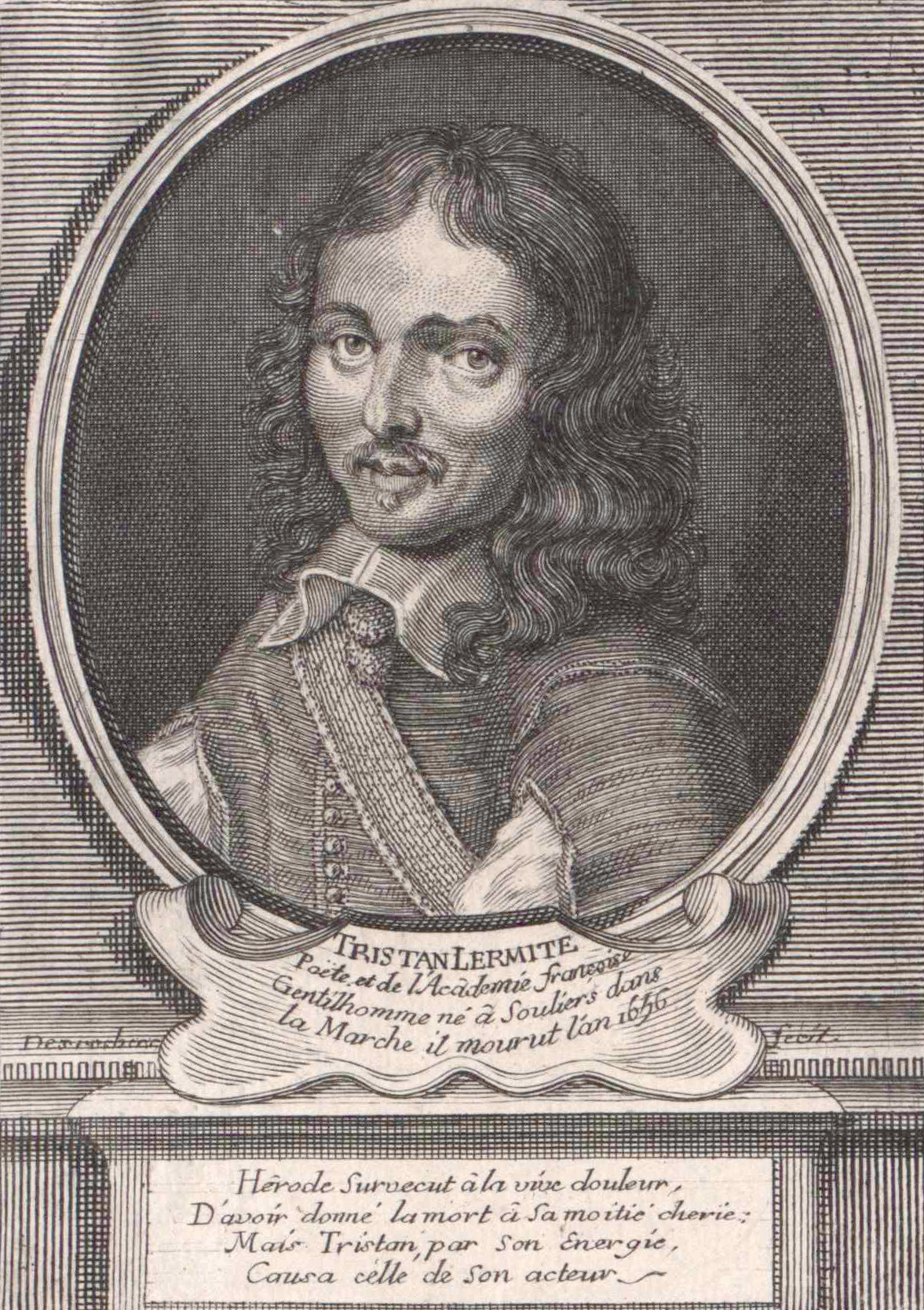
- Born: c. 1601; Janaillat, France
- Died: 7 September 1655
- Writing career
- Genres: poetry drama
- Notable work: Marianne
- Literary movement: Baroque

François l'Hermite (c. 1601 – 7 September 1655) was a French dramatist who wrote under the name Tristan l'Hermite. He was born at the Château de Soliers in the County of La Marche.

== Life ==
He killed his enemy in a duel at the age of thirteen, and was obliged to flee to England. The story of his childhood and youth he embroiders in a burlesque novel, the Page disgracie. He was, in succession, poet to Gaston d'Orléans, to the duchesse de Chaulnes and the duke of Guise.

His first tragedy, Marianne (1636), was also his best. It was followed by Penthée (1637), La Mort de Seneque (1644), La Mort de Crispe (1645) and the Parasite (1654). He was also the author of some admirable lyrics. Three of his best plays are printed in the Théâtre français of 1737.

He took his pseudonym from Tristan l'Hermite, a shadowy figure of the late Middle Ages who was provost of the marshals of the King's household under Louis XI.

He died of tuberculosis.
