= Lépinas =

Commune in Nouvelle-Aquitaine, France

- Commune
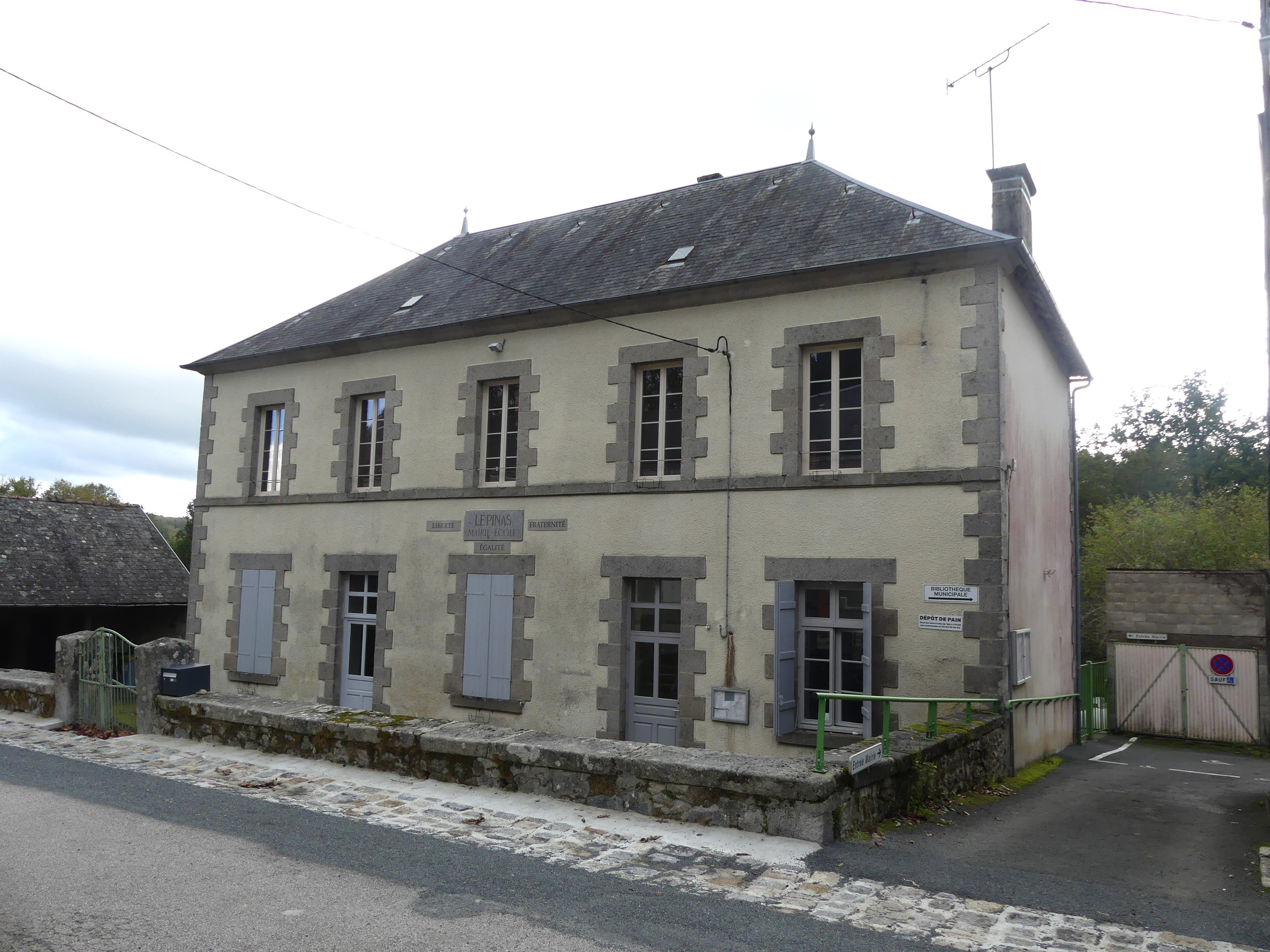
- Lépinas Town hall
- Location of Lépinas
- Location within France Location within Nouvelle-Aquitaine
- Coordinates: 46°04′39″N 1°55′45″E
- Country: France
- Region: Nouvelle-Aquitaine
- Department: Creuse
- Arrondissement: Guéret
- Canton: Ahun
- Intercommunality: CC Creuse Sud Ouest

Government
  - Mayor (2020–2026): Régis Parayre
- Area^{1}: 14.80 km^{2} (5.71 sq mi)
- Elevation: 600 m (2,000 ft)
- Highest elevation: 681 m (2,234 ft)
- Lowest elevation: 515 m (1,690 ft)
- Population (2023): 145
  - Density: 9.80/km^{2} (25.4/sq mi)
- Time zone: UTC+01:00 (CET)
  - Summer (DST): UTC+02:00 (CEST)
- INSEE/Postal code: 23107 /23150
- ^{1} French Land Register data, which excludes lakes, ponds, glaciers > 1 km^{2} (0.386 sq mi or 247 acres) and river estuaries.

Lépinas (Occitan: Filant) is a commune in the Creuse department in the Nouvelle-Aquitaine region in central France.

== Geography ==
An area of lakes, forestry and farming, comprising the village and some small hamlets, situated some 7 miles (11 km) south of Guéret at the junction of the D3, D50 and the D60 roads. The river Gartempe flows through the middle of the commune.

== Population ==
Historical population
Year	Pop.	±% p.a.
1968	306	—
1975	269	−1.82%
1982	231	−2.15%
1990	225	−0.33%
1999	191	−1.80%
2007	177	−0.95%
2012	162	−1.76%
2017	139	−3.02%
2023	145	+0.71%
Source: INSEE

== Sights ==
- The church, dating from the twelfth century.
- The lake of La Chapelle

== See also ==
- Communes of the Creuse department
