= Saint-Moreil =

Commune in Nouvelle-Aquitaine, France

- Commune
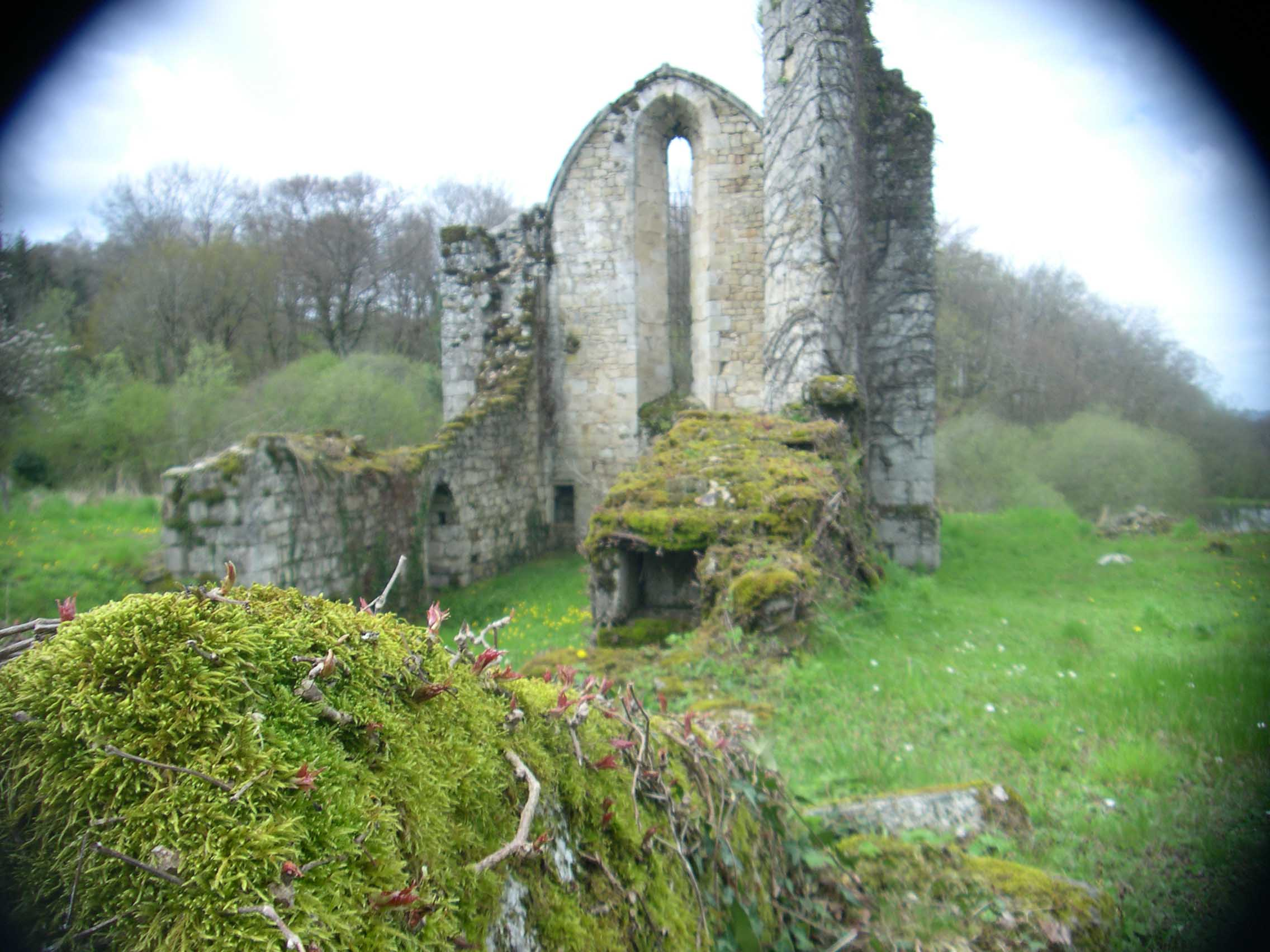
- The remains of the chapel in Saint-Moreil

- Coat of arms
- Location of Saint-Moreil
- Location within France Location within Nouvelle-Aquitaine
- Coordinates: 45°51′17″N 1°41′20″E
- Country: France
- Region: Nouvelle-Aquitaine
- Department: Creuse
- Arrondissement: Guéret
- Canton: Bourganeuf
- Intercommunality: CC Creuse Sud Ouest

Government
  - Mayor (2020–2026): Joseph Lehericy
- Area^{1}: 23.94 km^{2} (9.24 sq mi)
- Elevation: 430 m (1,410 ft)
- Highest elevation: 587 m (1,926 ft)
- Lowest elevation: 363 m (1,191 ft)
- Population (2023): 229
  - Density: 9.57/km^{2} (24.8/sq mi)
- Time zone: UTC+01:00 (CET)
  - Summer (DST): UTC+02:00 (CEST)
- INSEE/Postal code: 23223 /23400
- ^{1} French Land Register data, which excludes lakes, ponds, glaciers > 1 km^{2} (0.386 sq mi or 247 acres) and river estuaries.

Saint-Moreil (French pronunciation: [sɛ̃ mɔʁɛj]; Occitan: Sent Maurèlh) is a commune in the Creuse department in central France.

== Population ==
Historical population
Year	Pop.	±% p.a.
1968	475	—
1975	354	−4.11%
1982	325	−1.21%
1990	287	−1.54%
1999	292	+0.19%
2007	263	−1.30%
2012	230	−2.65%
2017	219	−0.98%
2023	229	+0.75%
Source: INSEE

== See also ==
- Communes of the Creuse department
