= Saint-Pardoux-Morterolles =

Commune in Nouvelle-Aquitaine, France

- Commune
- Location of Saint-Pardoux-Morterolles
- Location within France Location within Nouvelle-Aquitaine
- Coordinates: 45°53′55″N 1°49′19″E
- Country: France
- Region: Nouvelle-Aquitaine
- Department: Creuse
- Arrondissement: Guéret
- Canton: Bourganeuf
- Intercommunality: CC Creuse Sud Ouest

Government
  - Mayor (2020–2026): Patrice Pataud
- Area^{1}: 36.5 km^{2} (14.1 sq mi)
- Elevation: 599 m (1,965 ft)
- Highest elevation: 798 m (2,618 ft)
- Lowest elevation: 467 m (1,532 ft)
- Population (2023): 211
  - Density: 5.78/km^{2} (15.0/sq mi)
- Time zone: UTC+01:00 (CET)
  - Summer (DST): UTC+02:00 (CEST)
- INSEE/Postal code: 23227 /23400
- ^{1} French Land Register data, which excludes lakes, ponds, glaciers > 1 km^{2} (0.386 sq mi or 247 acres) and river estuaries.

Saint-Pardoux-Morterolles (Limousin: Sent Pardós Morteiròu) is a commune in the Creuse department in central France.

== Population ==
Historical population
Year	Pop.	±% p.a.
1968	366	—
1975	286	−3.46%
1982	254	−1.68%
1990	254	+0.00%
1999	242	−0.54%
2007	215	−1.47%
2012	215	+0.00%
2017	206	−0.85%
2023	211	+0.40%
Source: INSEE

== See also ==
- Communes of the Creuse department
