= Arrondissement of Guéret =

Coordinates: 46.17°N 1.87°E

Guéret
- Arrondissement
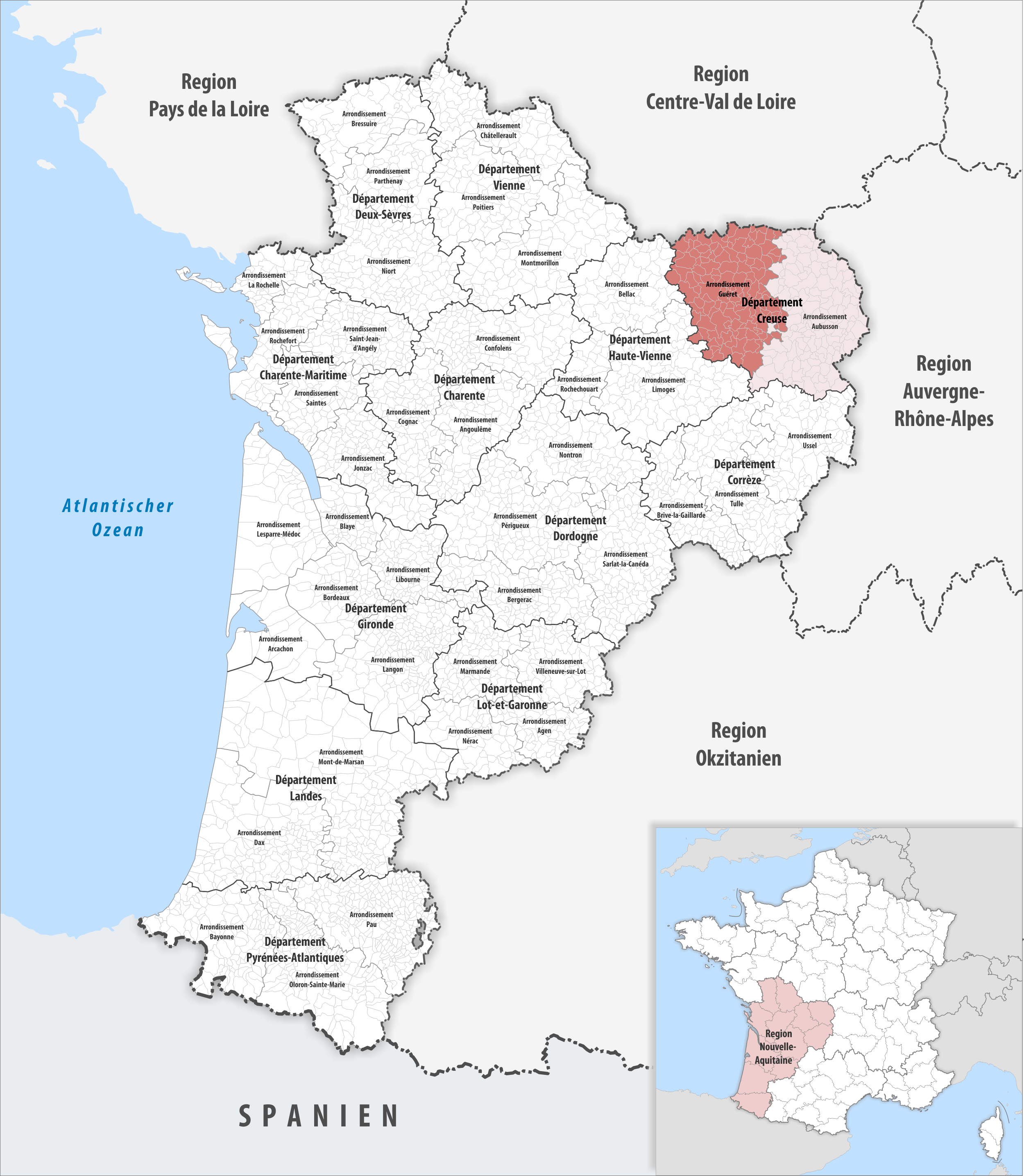
- Location within the region Nouvelle-Aquitaine
- Country: France
- Region: Nouvelle-Aquitaine
- Department: Creuse
- No. of communes: {{{nbcomm}}}
- Area: 2,736.7 km^{2} (1,056.6 sq mi)
- Population (2023): 72,618
  - Density: 26.535/km^{2} (68.725/sq mi)
- INSEE code: 232

The arrondissement of Guéret is an arrondissement of France in the Creuse department in the Nouvelle-Aquitaine region. It has 127 communes. Its population is 72,586 (2021), and its area is 2,736.7 km^{2} (1,056.6 sq mi).

== Composition ==
The communes of the arrondissement of Guéret, and their INSEE codes, are:

1. Ahun (23001)
2. Ajain (23002)
3. Anzême (23004)
4. Arrènes (23006)
5. Ars (23007)
6. Augères (23010)
7. Aulon (23011)
8. Auriat (23012)
9. Azat-Châtenet (23014)
10. Azerables (23015)
11. Banize (23016)
12. Bazelat (23018)
13. Bénévent-l'Abbaye (23021)
14. Bonnat (23025)
15. Bosmoreau-les-Mines (23027)
16. Bourganeuf (23030)
17. Le Bourg-d'Hem (23029)
18. La Brionne (23033)
19. Bussière-Dunoise (23036)
20. La Celle-Dunoise (23039)
21. La Cellette (23041)
22. Ceyroux (23042)
23. Chamberaud (23043)
24. Chambon-Sainte-Croix (23044)
25. Chamborand (23047)
26. Champsanglard (23049)
27. La Chapelle-Baloue (23050)
28. La Chapelle-Saint-Martial (23051)
29. La Chapelle-Taillefert (23052)
30. Châtelus-le-Marcheix (23056)
31. Châtelus-Malvaleix (23057)
32. Chavanat (23060)
33. Chéniers (23062)
34. Colondannes (23065)
35. Crozant (23070)
36. Le Donzeil (23074)
37. Dun-le-Palestel (23075)
38. Faux-Mazuras (23078)
39. Fleurat (23082)
40. La Forêt-du-Temple (23084)
41. Fransèches (23086)
42. Fresselines (23087)
43. Fursac (23192)
44. Gartempe (23088)
45. Genouillac (23089)
46. Glénic (23092)
47. Le Grand-Bourg (23095)
48. Guéret (23096)
49. Jalesches (23098)
50. Janaillat (23099)
51. Jouillat (23101)
52. Lafat (23103)
53. Lépinas (23107)
54. Linard-Malval (23109)
55. Lizières (23111)
56. Lourdoueix-Saint-Pierre (23112)
57. Maison-Feyne (23117)
58. Maisonnisses (23118)
59. Mansat-la-Courrière (23122)
60. Marsac (23124)
61. Mazeirat (23128)
62. Méasnes (23130)
63. Montaigut-le-Blanc (23132)
64. Montboucher (23133)
65. Le Monteil-au-Vicomte (23134)
66. Mortroux (23136)
67. Mourioux-Vieilleville (23137)
68. Moutier-d'Ahun (23138)
69. Moutier-Malcard (23139)
70. Naillat (23141)
71. Noth (23143)
72. Nouzerolles (23147)
73. Nouziers (23148)
74. Peyrabout (23150)
75. Pontarion (23155)
76. La Pouge (23157)
77. Roches (23162)
78. Royère-de-Vassivière (23165)
79. Sagnat (23166)
80. Saint-Agnant-de-Versillat (23177)
81. Saint-Amand-Jartoudeix (23181)
82. Saint-Avit-le-Pauvre (23183)
83. Saint-Christophe (23186)
84. Saint-Dizier-les-Domaines (23188)
85. Saint-Dizier-Masbaraud (23189)
86. Sainte-Feyre (23193)
87. Saint-Éloi (23191)
88. Saint-Fiel (23195)
89. Saint-Georges-la-Pouge (23197)
90. Saint-Germain-Beaupré (23199)
91. Saint-Goussaud (23200)
92. Saint-Hilaire-la-Plaine (23201)
93. Saint-Hilaire-le-Château (23202)
94. Saint-Junien-la-Bregère (23205)
95. Saint-Laurent (23206)
96. Saint-Léger-Bridereix (23207)
97. Saint-Léger-le-Guérétois (23208)
98. Saint-Martial-le-Mont (23214)
99. Saint-Martin-Château (23216)
100. Saint-Martin-Sainte-Catherine (23217)
101. Saint-Maurice-la-Souterraine (23219)
102. Saint-Michel-de-Veisse (23222)
103. Saint-Moreil (23223)
104. Saint-Pardoux-Morterolles (23227)
105. Saint-Pierre-Bellevue (23232)
106. Saint-Pierre-Chérignat (23230)
107. Saint-Priest-la-Feuille (23235)
108. Saint-Priest-la-Plaine (23236)
109. Saint-Priest-Palus (23237)
110. Saint-Sébastien (23239)
111. Saint-Silvain-Montaigut (23242)
112. Saint-Sulpice-le-Dunois (23244)
113. Saint-Sulpice-le-Guérétois (23245)
114. Saint-Vaury (23247)
115. Saint-Victor-en-Marche (23248)
116. Saint-Yrieix-les-Bois (23250)
117. Sardent (23168)
118. La Saunière (23169)
119. Savennes (23170)
120. Soubrebost (23173)
121. Sous-Parsat (23175)
122. La Souterraine (23176)
123. Tercillat (23252)
124. Thauron (23253)
125. Vareilles (23258)
126. Vidaillat (23260)
127. Villard (23263)

== History ==
The arrondissement of Guéret was created in 1800. At the March 2017 reorganisation of the arrondissements of Creuse, it gained 18 communes from the arrondissement of Aubusson, and it lost 28 communes to the arrondissement of Aubusson.

As a result of the reorganisation of the cantons of France which came into effect in 2015, the borders of the cantons are no longer related to the borders of the arrondissements. The cantons of the arrondissement of Guéret were, as of January 2015:

1. Ahun
2. Bénévent-l'Abbaye
3. Bonnat
4. Bourganeuf
5. Boussac
6. Châtelus-Malvaleix
7. Dun-le-Palestel
8. Le Grand-Bourg
9. Guéret-Nord
10. Guéret-Sud-Est
11. Guéret-Sud-Ouest
12. Jarnages
13. Pontarion
14. Saint-Vaury
15. La Souterraine
