= Saint-Yrieix-les-Bois =

Commune in Nouvelle-Aquitaine, France

- Commune
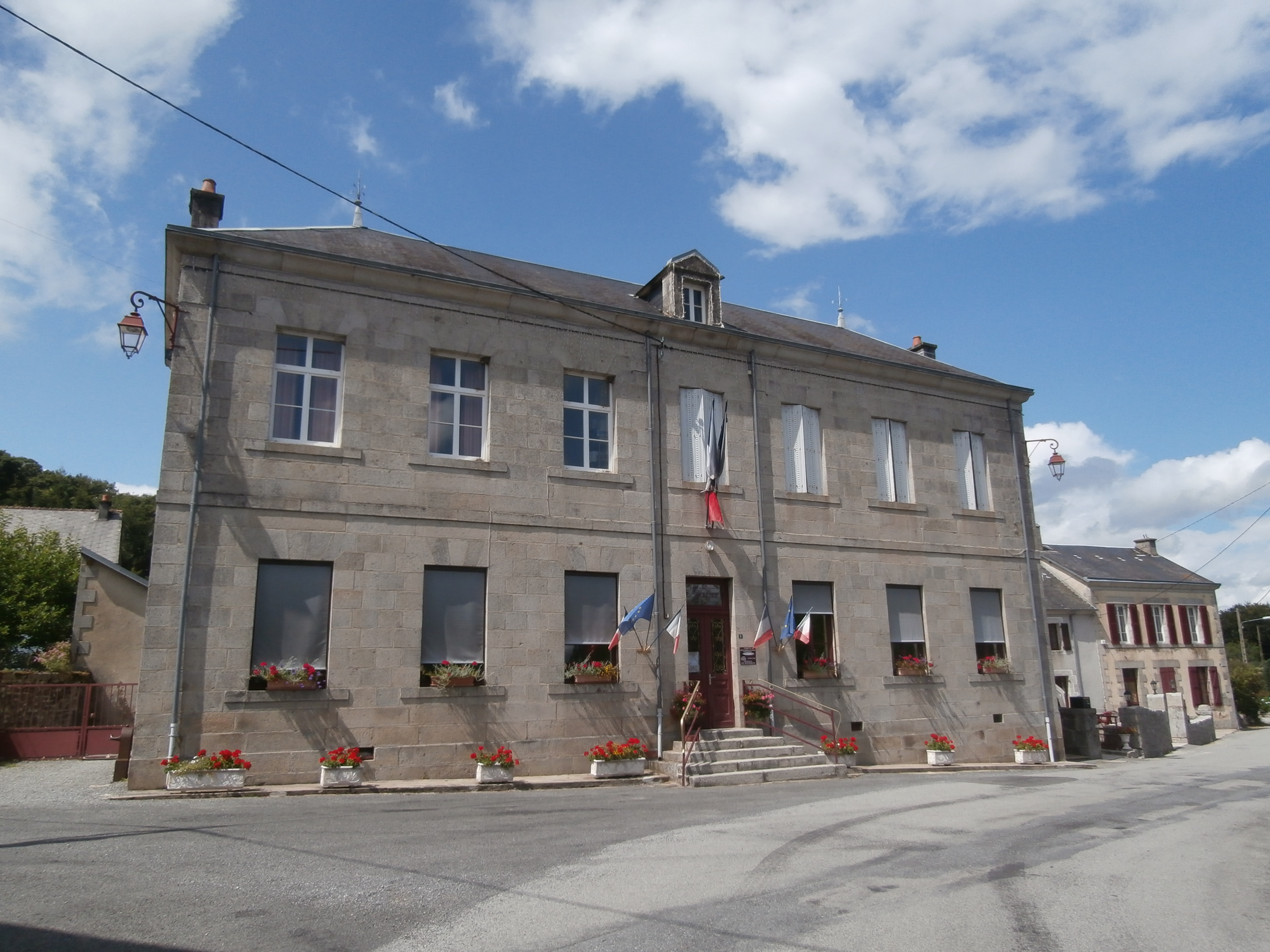
- The town hall in Saint-Yrieix-les-Bois
- Location of Saint-Yrieix-les-Bois
- Location within France Location within Nouvelle-Aquitaine
- Coordinates: 46°06′02″N 1°56′21″E
- Country: France
- Region: Nouvelle-Aquitaine
- Department: Creuse
- Arrondissement: Guéret
- Canton: Ahun
- Intercommunality: CA Grand Guéret

Government
  - Mayor (2020–2026): Alex Aucouturier
- Area^{1}: 15.7 km^{2} (6.1 sq mi)
- Elevation: 460 m (1,510 ft)
- Highest elevation: 645 m (2,116 ft)
- Lowest elevation: 417 m (1,368 ft)
- Population (2023): 275
  - Density: 17.5/km^{2} (45.4/sq mi)
- Time zone: UTC+01:00 (CET)
  - Summer (DST): UTC+02:00 (CEST)
- INSEE/Postal code: 23250 /23150
- ^{1} French Land Register data, which excludes lakes, ponds, glaciers > 1 km^{2} (0.386 sq mi or 247 acres) and river estuaries.

Saint-Yrieix-les-Bois (French pronunciation: [sɛ̃.t‿iʁjɛ le bwa]; Occitan: Sent Iriès lo Bòsc) is a commune in the Creuse department in central France.

== Population ==
Historical population
Year	Pop.	±% p.a.
1968	385	—
1975	338	−1.84%
1982	307	−1.36%
1990	326	+0.75%
1999	311	−0.52%
2007	336	+0.97%
2012	292	−2.77%
2017	286	−0.41%
2023	275	−0.65%
Source: INSEE

== See also ==
- Communes of the Creuse department
