= Saint-Hilaire-la-Plaine =

Commune in Nouvelle-Aquitaine, France

- Commune
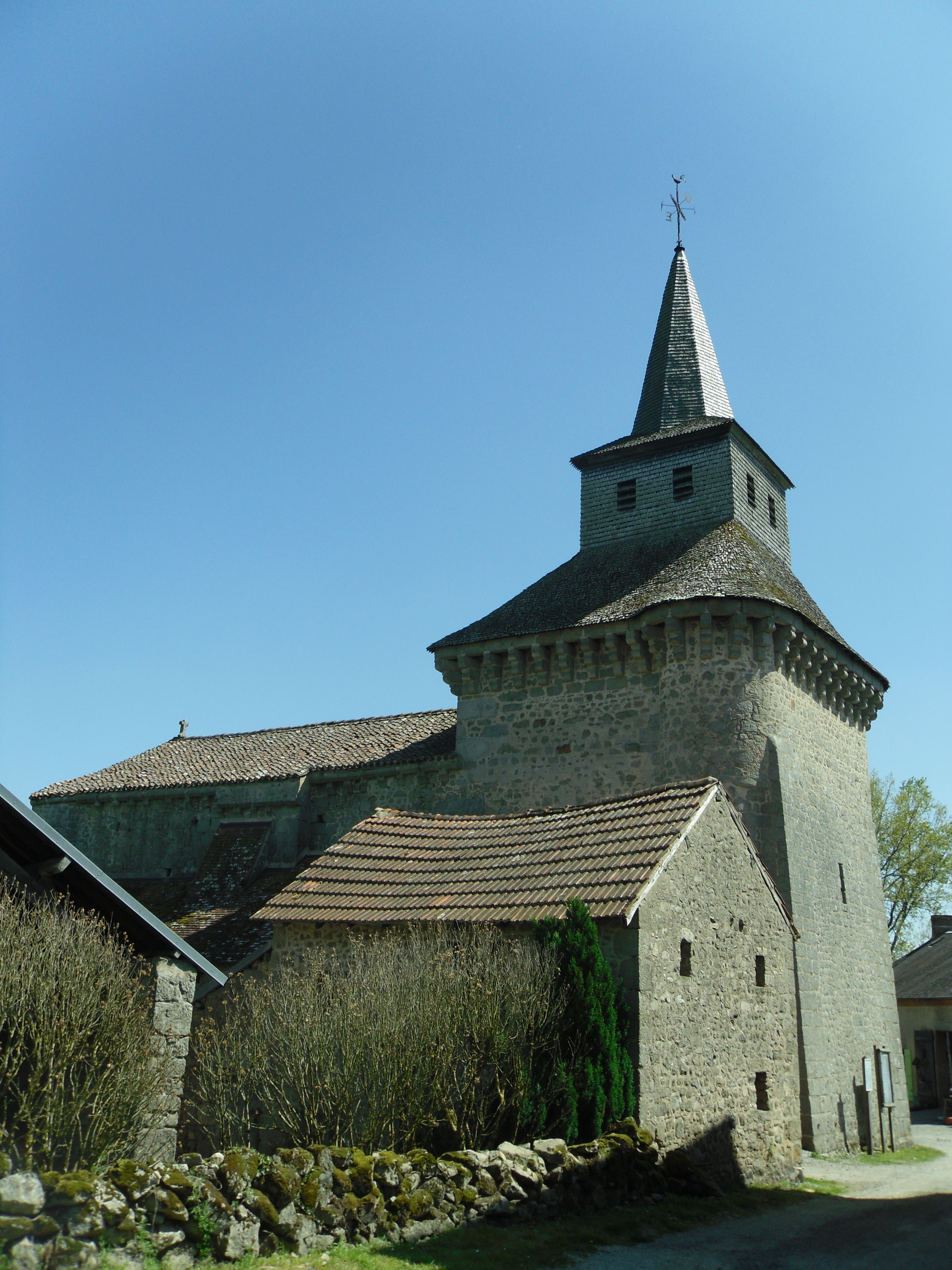
- The church of Saint-Hilaire, in Saint-Hilaire-la-Plaine
- Location of Saint-Hilaire-la-Plaine
- Location within France Location within Nouvelle-Aquitaine
- Coordinates: 46°07′34″N 1°58′38″E
- Country: France
- Region: Nouvelle-Aquitaine
- Department: Creuse
- Arrondissement: Guéret
- Canton: Ahun
- Intercommunality: CC Creuse Sud Ouest

Government
  - Mayor (2020–2026): Joël Laine
- Area^{1}: 11.06 km^{2} (4.27 sq mi)
- Elevation: 415 m (1,362 ft)
- Highest elevation: 506 m (1,660 ft)
- Lowest elevation: 395 m (1,296 ft)
- Population (2023): 209
  - Density: 18.9/km^{2} (48.9/sq mi)
- Time zone: UTC+01:00 (CET)
  - Summer (DST): UTC+02:00 (CEST)
- INSEE/Postal code: 23201 /23150
- ^{1} French Land Register data, which excludes lakes, ponds, glaciers > 1 km^{2} (0.386 sq mi or 247 acres) and river estuaries.

Saint-Hilaire-la-Plaine (French pronunciation: [sɛ̃.t‿ilɛʁ la plɛn]; Occitan: Sent Alari la Plana) is a commune in the Creuse department in central France.

== Population ==
Historical population
Year	Pop.	±% p.a.
1968	247	—
1975	234	−0.77%
1982	252	+1.06%
1990	237	−0.76%
1999	235	−0.09%
2007	230	−0.27%
2012	209	−1.90%
2017	210	+0.10%
2023	209	−0.08%
Source: INSEE

== See also ==
- Communes of the Creuse department
