= Maisonnisses =

Commune in Nouvelle-Aquitaine, France

- Commune
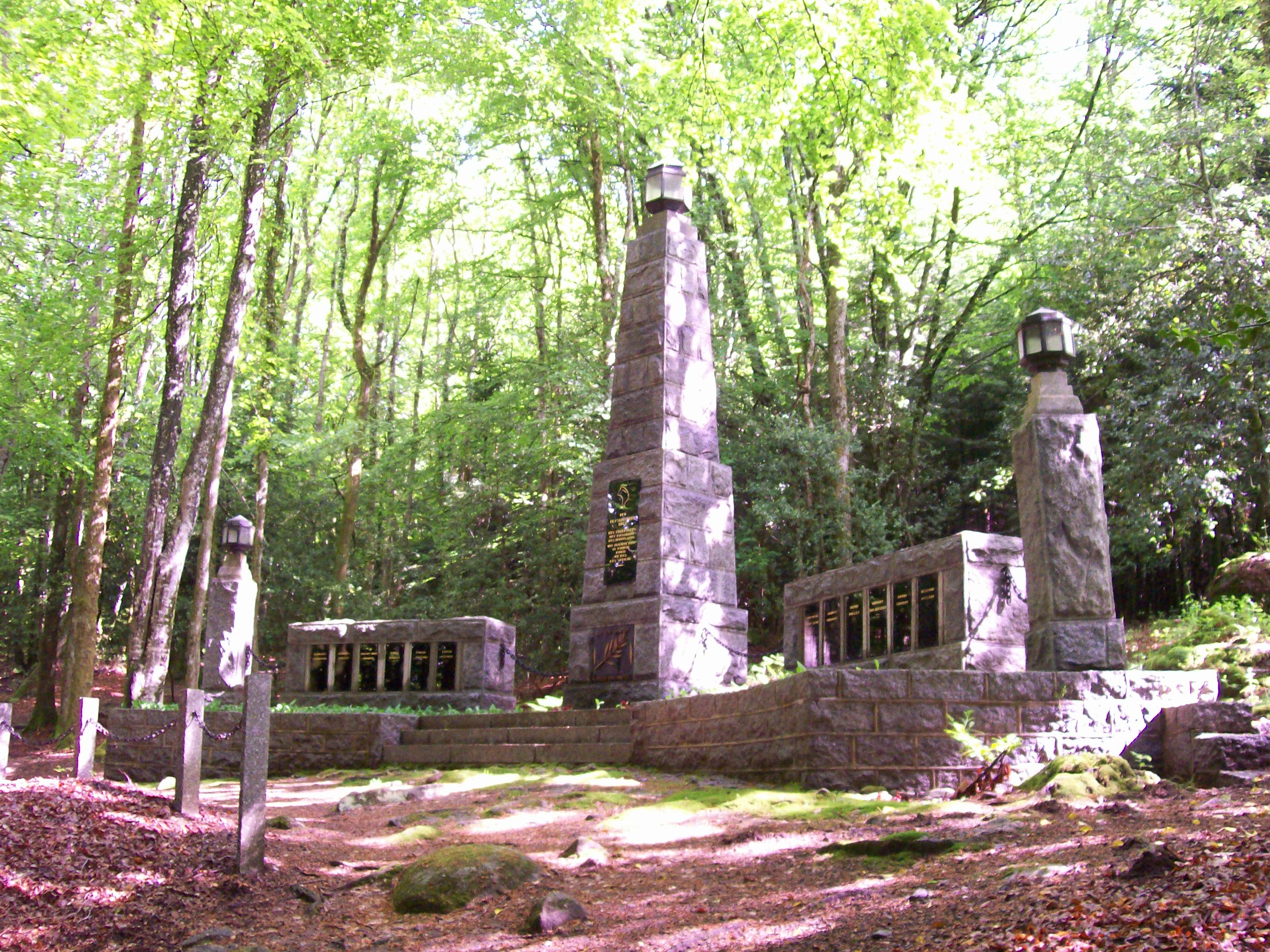
- Monument to Resistance fighters
- Location of Maisonnisses
- Location within France Location within Nouvelle-Aquitaine
- Coordinates: 46°03′49″N 1°53′59″E
- Country: France
- Region: Nouvelle-Aquitaine
- Department: Creuse
- Arrondissement: Guéret
- Canton: Ahun
- Intercommunality: CC Creuse Sud Ouest

Government
  - Mayor (2020–2026): Dominique Berteloot
- Area^{1}: 11.12 km^{2} (4.29 sq mi)
- Elevation: 500 m (1,600 ft)
- Highest elevation: 685 m (2,247 ft)
- Lowest elevation: 517 m (1,696 ft)
- Population (2023): 176
  - Density: 15.8/km^{2} (41.0/sq mi)
- Time zone: UTC+01:00 (CET)
  - Summer (DST): UTC+02:00 (CEST)
- INSEE/Postal code: 23118 /23150
- ^{1} French Land Register data, which excludes lakes, ponds, glaciers > 1 km^{2} (0.386 sq mi or 247 acres) and river estuaries.

Maisonnisses (French pronunciation: [mɛzɔnis]; Occitan: Maisoniças) is a commune in the Creuse department in the Nouvelle-Aquitaine region in central France.

== Geography ==
A farming and forestry area comprising the village and some small hamlets, situated some 8 miles (13 km) south of Guéret at the junction of the D50, D60 and the D34 roads. The small river Gartempe flows through the middle of the commune.

== Population ==
Historical population
| Year | Pop. | ±% p.a. |
|---|---|---|
| 1968 | 284 | — |
| 1975 | 265 | −0.98% |
| 1982 | 189 | −4.71% |
| 1990 | 206 | +1.08% |
| 1999 | 213 | +0.37% |
| 2007 | 208 | −0.30% |
| 2012 | 204 | −0.39% |
| 2017 | 190 | −1.41% |
| 2023 | 176 | −1.27% |
Source: INSEE

== Sights ==
- The church of Saint-Jean-Baptiste, dating from the fourteenth century.
- A war memorial.

== See also ==
- Communes of the Creuse department
