= Ars, Creuse =

Commune in Nouvelle-Aquitaine, France

Ars
- Commune
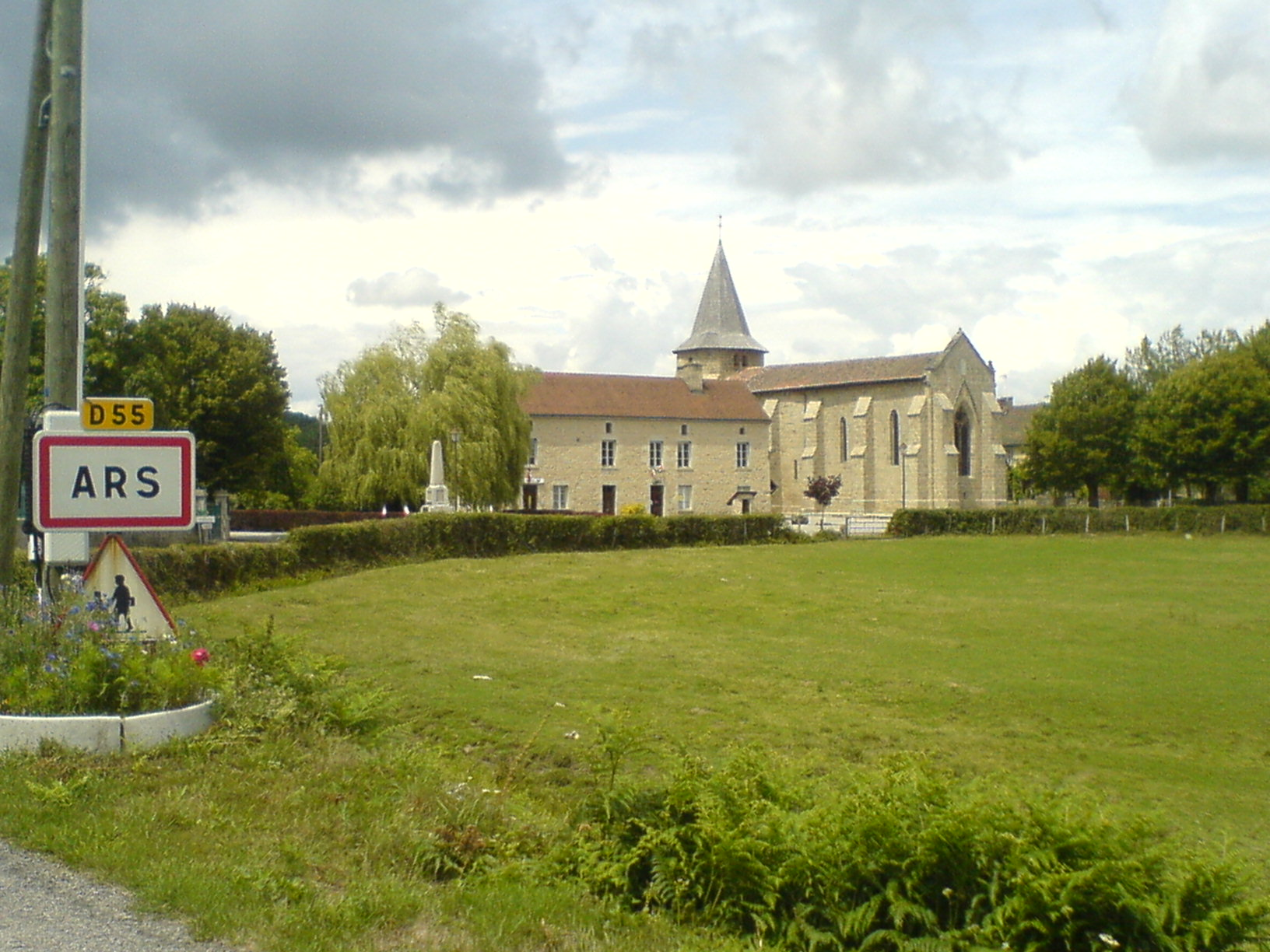
- The church of Saint-Barthélemy, in Ars

- Coat of arms
- Location of Ars
- Location within France Location within Nouvelle-Aquitaine
- Coordinates: 46°00′18″N 2°04′45″E
- Country: France
- Region: Nouvelle-Aquitaine
- Department: Creuse
- Arrondissement: Guéret
- Canton: Ahun
- Intercommunality: CC Creuse Sud Ouest

Government
  - Mayor (2020–2026): Denis Sarty
- Area^{1}: 21.69 km^{2} (8.37 sq mi)
- Elevation: 560 m (1,840 ft)
- Highest elevation: 625 m (2,051 ft)
- Lowest elevation: 427 m (1,401 ft)
- Population (2023): 239
  - Density: 11.0/km^{2} (28.5/sq mi)
- Time zone: UTC+01:00 (CET)
  - Summer (DST): UTC+02:00 (CEST)
- INSEE/Postal code: 23007 /23480
- ^{1} French Land Register data, which excludes lakes, ponds, glaciers > 1 km^{2} (0.386 sq mi or 247 acres) and river estuaries.

Ars (Occitan: Arç) is a commune in the Creuse department in the Nouvelle-Aquitaine region in central France.

== Geography ==
An area of lakes, forestry and farming comprising the village and several hamlets situated by the banks of the small river Voutouéry, some 5 miles (8.0 km) northwest of Aubusson at the junction of the D55, D54 and the D7 roads.

== Population ==
Historical population
Year	Pop.	±% p.a.
1968	336	—
1975	265	−3.33%
1982	250	−0.83%
1990	247	−0.15%
1999	247	+0.00%
2007	252	+0.25%
2012	260	+0.63%
2017	244	−1.26%
2023	239	−0.34%
Source: INSEE

== Sights ==
- The church, dating from the thirteenth century.
- The ruins of the castle of Ars.
- A chapel, dating from the sixteenth century.

== See also ==
- Communes of the Creuse department
