= Saint-Georges-la-Pouge =

Commune in Nouvelle-Aquitaine, France

- Commune
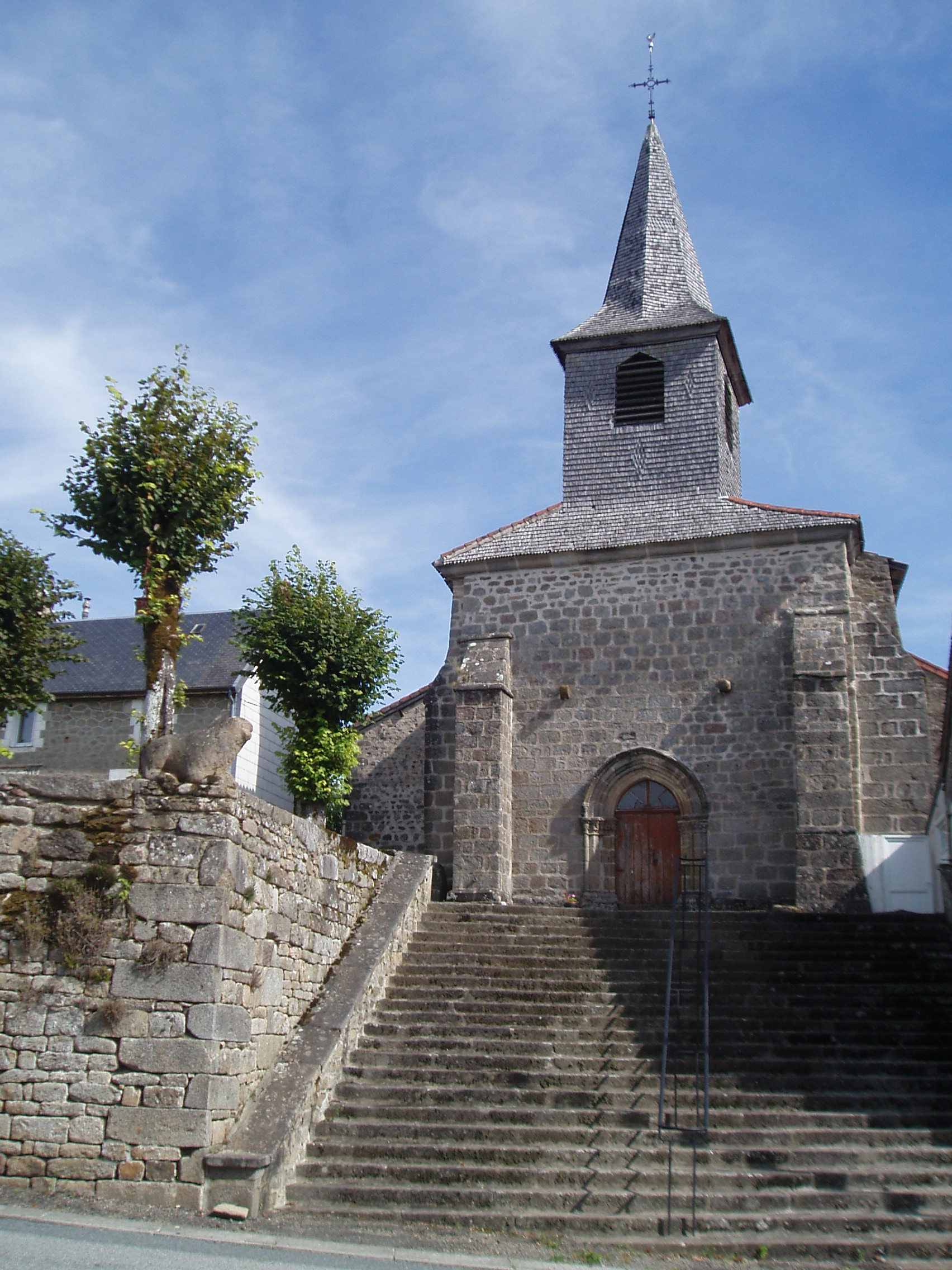
- The church in Saint-Georges-la-Pouge
- Location of Saint-Georges-la-Pouge
- Location within France Location within Nouvelle-Aquitaine
- Coordinates: 45°59′38″N 1°58′15″E
- Country: France
- Region: Nouvelle-Aquitaine
- Department: Creuse
- Arrondissement: Guéret
- Canton: Ahun
- Intercommunality: CC Creuse Sud Ouest

Government
  - Mayor (2023–2026): Delphine Poitou
- Area^{1}: 24.09 km^{2} (9.30 sq mi)
- Elevation: 565 m (1,854 ft)
- Highest elevation: 636 m (2,087 ft)
- Lowest elevation: 470 m (1,540 ft)
- Population (2023): 355
  - Density: 14.7/km^{2} (38.2/sq mi)
- Time zone: UTC+01:00 (CET)
  - Summer (DST): UTC+02:00 (CEST)
- INSEE/Postal code: 23197 /23250
- ^{1} French Land Register data, which excludes lakes, ponds, glaciers > 1 km^{2} (0.386 sq mi or 247 acres) and river estuaries.

Saint-Georges-la-Pouge (French pronunciation: [sɛ̃ ʒɔʁʒ la puʒ]; Occitan: Sent Jòrgi de la Poja) is a commune in the Creuse department in central France.

== Population ==
Historical population
Year	Pop.	±% p.a.
1968	495	—
1975	427	−2.09%
1982	418	−0.30%
1990	328	−2.99%
1999	311	−0.59%
2007	337	+1.01%
2012	357	+1.16%
2017	370	+0.72%
2023	355	−0.69%
Source: INSEE

== See also ==
- Communes of the Creuse department
