= Sous-Parsat =

Commune in Nouvelle-Aquitaine, France

- Commune
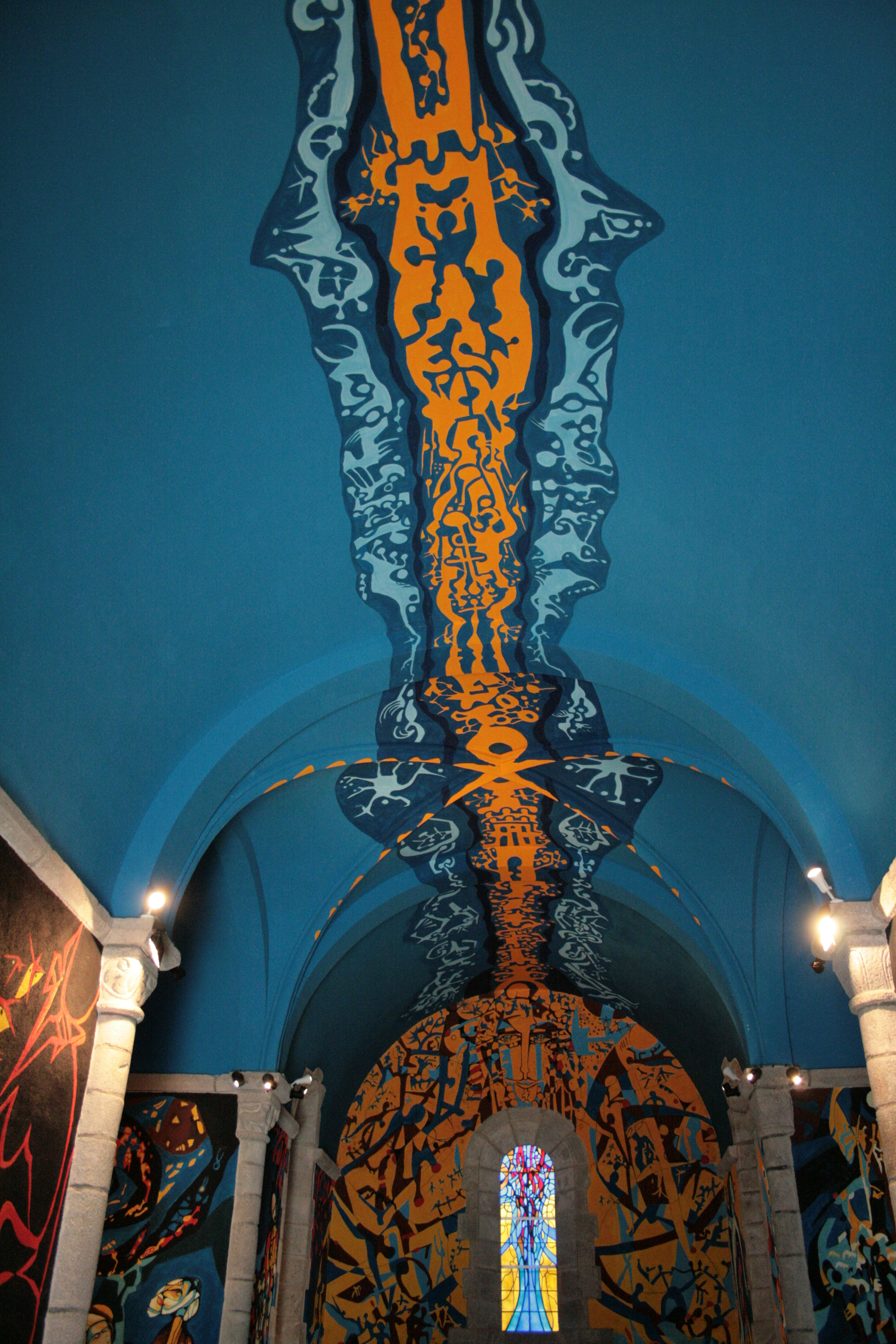
- The decorated ceiling in the church
- Location of Sous-Parsat
- Location within France Location within Nouvelle-Aquitaine
- Coordinates: 46°03′23″N 1°58′51″E
- Country: France
- Region: Nouvelle-Aquitaine
- Department: Creuse
- Arrondissement: Guéret
- Canton: Ahun
- Intercommunality: CC Creuse Sud Ouest

Government
  - Mayor (2020–2026): Jean-Michel Ricard
- Area^{1}: 9.14 km^{2} (3.53 sq mi)
- Elevation: 595 m (1,952 ft)
- Highest elevation: 647 m (2,123 ft)
- Lowest elevation: 486 m (1,594 ft)
- Population (2023): 112
  - Density: 12.3/km^{2} (31.7/sq mi)
- Time zone: UTC+01:00 (CET)
  - Summer (DST): UTC+02:00 (CEST)
- INSEE/Postal code: 23175 /23150
- ^{1} French Land Register data, which excludes lakes, ponds, glaciers > 1 km^{2} (0.386 sq mi or 247 acres) and river estuaries.

Sous-Parsat (Occitan: Sota) is a commune in the Creuse department in the Nouvelle-Aquitaine region in central France.

== Geography ==
An area of lakes and streams, farming and forestry comprising the village and several hamlets situated some 12 miles (19 km) northwest of Aubusson, at the junction of the D17, D45 and the D60 roads.

== Population ==
Historical population
Year	Pop.	±% p.a.
1968	203	—
1975	191	−0.87%
1982	181	−0.77%
1990	155	−1.92%
1999	138	−1.28%
2007	149	+0.96%
2012	135	−1.95%
2017	115	−3.16%
2023	112	−0.44%
Source: INSEE

== Sights ==
- The ruins of a seventeenth-century church at Mareille-au-Prieur.
- 2 Roman columns.
- A washhouse and horse-trough at Le Pont.
- The church, with parts dating from the twelfth century and paintings by Gabriel Chabrat realised between in the 1980s.
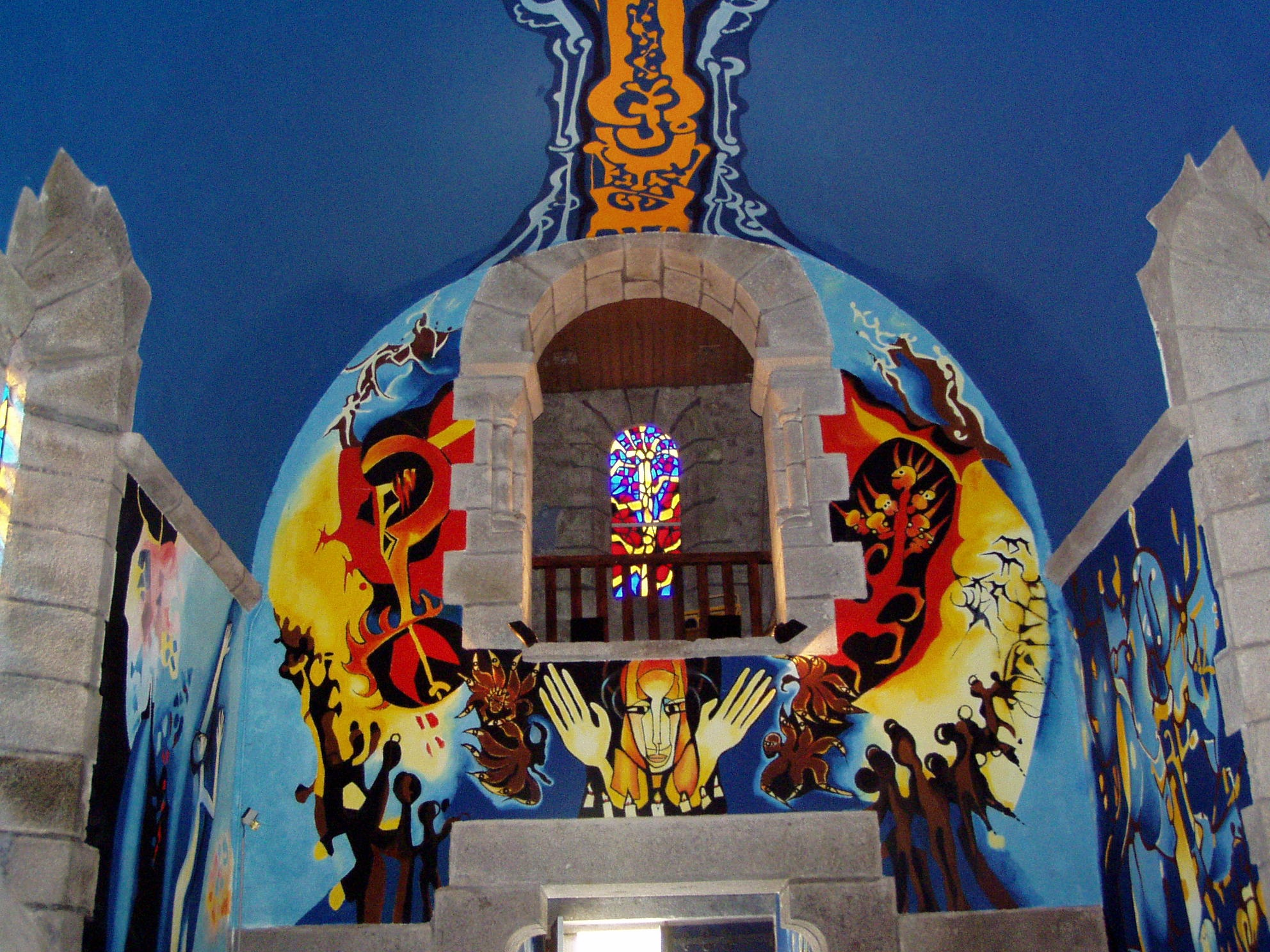
Apocalypse

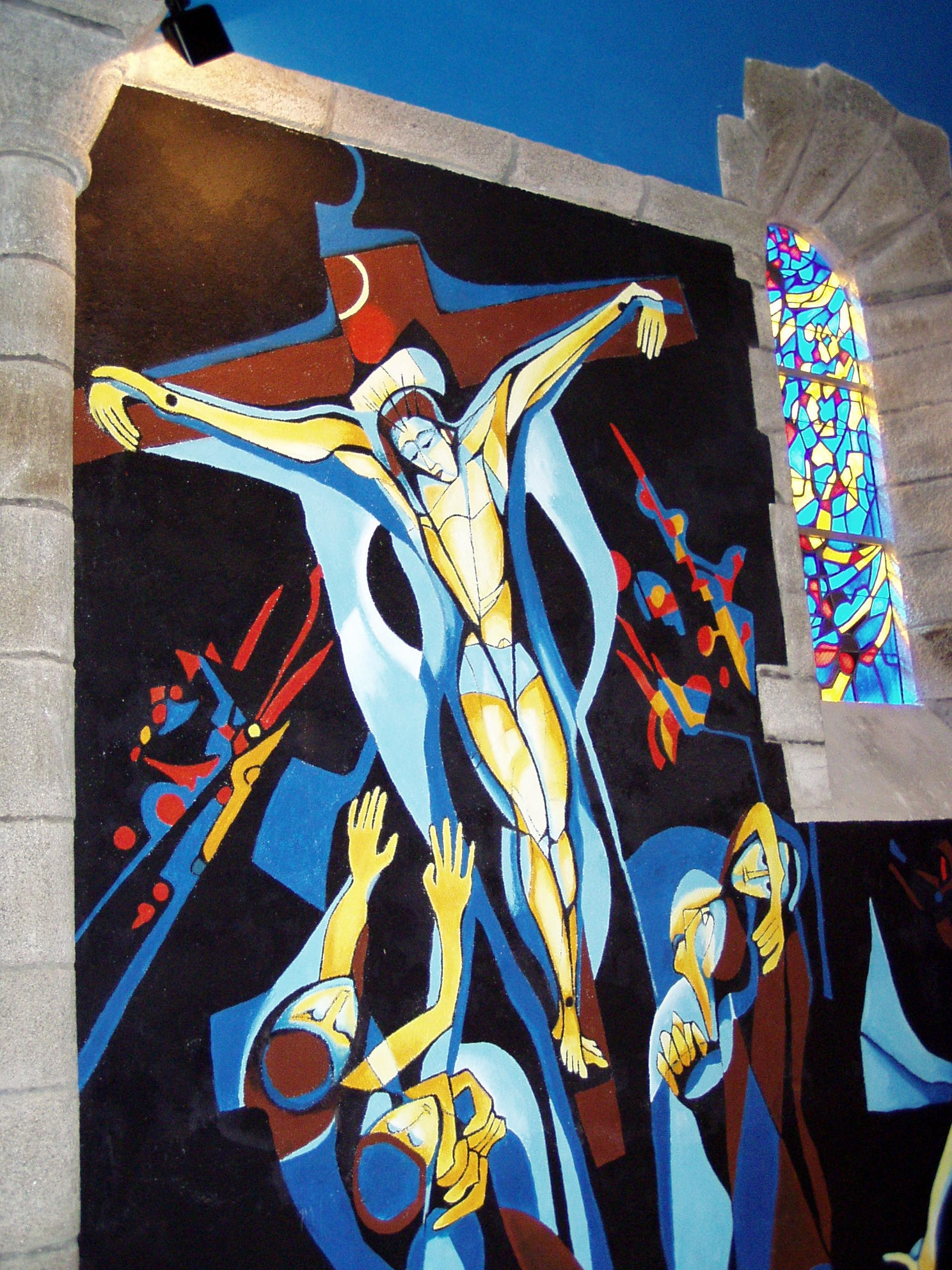
Crucifixion

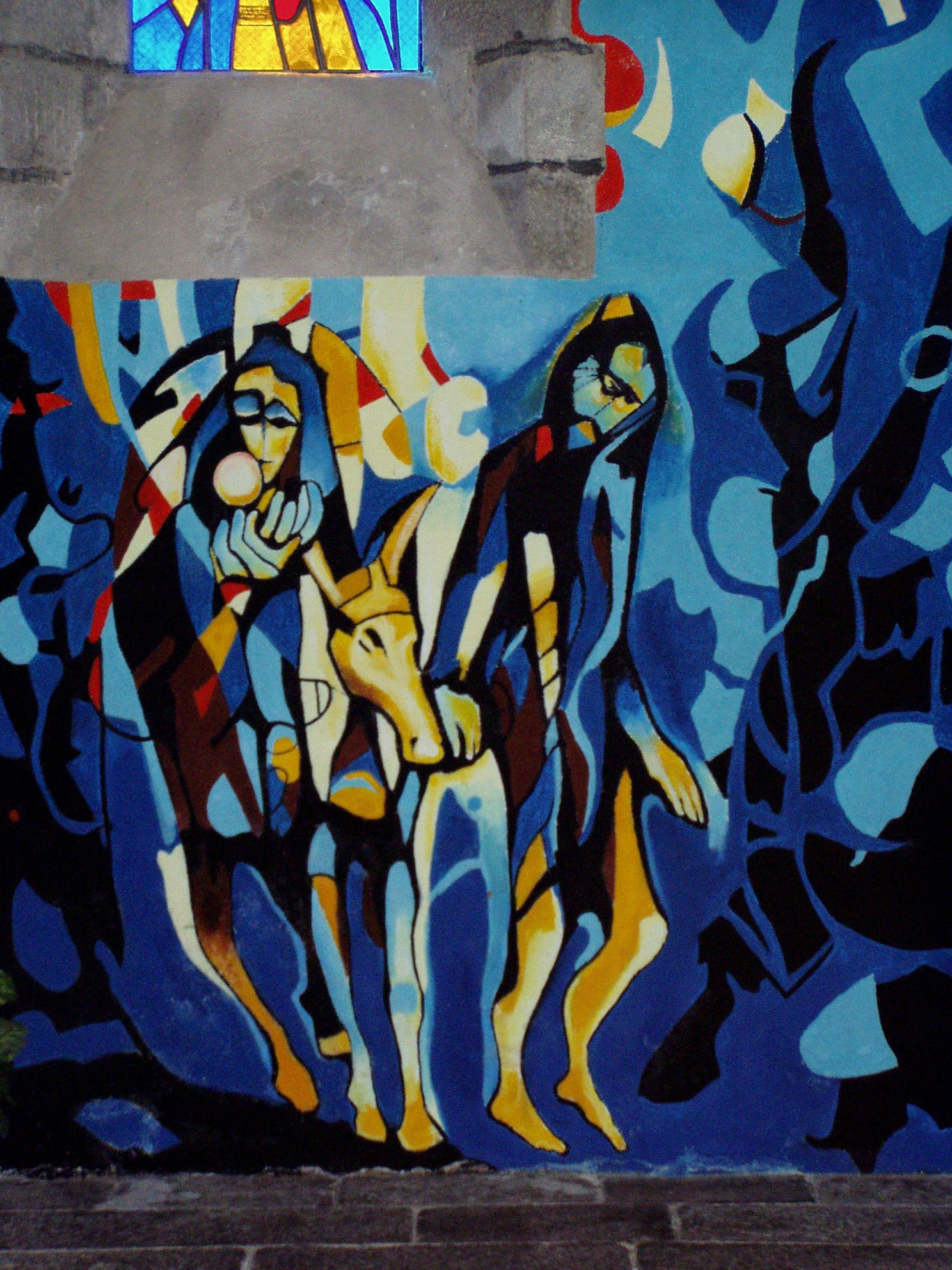
Flight to Egypt

== See also ==
- Communes of the Creuse department
