= La Pouge =

Commune in Nouvelle-Aquitaine, France

- Commune
- Location of La Pouge
- Location within France Location within Nouvelle-Aquitaine
- Coordinates: 45°58′54″N 1°56′45″E
- Country: France
- Region: Nouvelle-Aquitaine
- Department: Creuse
- Arrondissement: Guéret
- Canton: Ahun
- Intercommunality: CC Creuse Sud Ouest

Government
  - Mayor (2025–2026): Serge Godet
- Area^{1}: 7.58 km^{2} (2.93 sq mi)
- Elevation: 597 m (1,959 ft)
- Highest elevation: 618 m (2,028 ft)
- Lowest elevation: 454 m (1,490 ft)
- Population (2023): 96
  - Density: 13/km^{2} (33/sq mi)
- Time zone: UTC+01:00 (CET)
  - Summer (DST): UTC+02:00 (CEST)
- INSEE/Postal code: 23157 /23250
- ^{1} French Land Register data, which excludes lakes, ponds, glaciers > 1 km^{2} (0.386 sq mi or 247 acres) and river estuaries.

La Pouge (French pronunciation: [la puʒ]; Occitan: La Poja) is a commune in the Creuse department in the Nouvelle-Aquitaine region in central France.

== Geography ==
A small village of farming and forestry situated some 16 miles (26 km) south of Guéret at the junction of the D941 and the D45 roads.

== Population ==
Historical population
Year	Pop.	±% p.a.
1968	119	—
1975	111	−0.99%
1982	110	−0.13%
1990	87	−2.89%
1999	78	−1.21%
2007	74	−0.66%
2012	83	+2.32%
2017	90	+1.63%
2023	96	+1.08%
Source: INSEE

== Sights ==
- The church dating from the thirteenth century.

== See also ==
- Communes of the Creuse department
