= Janaillat =

Commune in Nouvelle-Aquitaine, France

- Commune
- Coat of arms
- Location of Janaillat
- Location within France Location within Nouvelle-Aquitaine
- Coordinates: 46°03′27″N 1°44′47″E
- Country: France
- Region: Nouvelle-Aquitaine
- Department: Creuse
- Arrondissement: Guéret
- Canton: Ahun
- Intercommunality: CC Creuse Sud Ouest

Government
  - Mayor (2020–2026): Raymond Dubreuil
- Area^{1}: 28.29 km^{2} (10.92 sq mi)
- Elevation: 600 m (2,000 ft)
- Highest elevation: 631 m (2,070 ft)
- Lowest elevation: 410 m (1,350 ft)
- Population (2023): 317
  - Density: 11.2/km^{2} (29.0/sq mi)
- Time zone: UTC+01:00 (CET)
  - Summer (DST): UTC+02:00 (CEST)
- INSEE/Postal code: 23099 /23250
- ^{1} French Land Register data, which excludes lakes, ponds, glaciers > 1 km^{2} (0.386 sq mi or 247 acres) and river estuaries.

Janaillat (French pronunciation: [ʒanaja]; Occitan: Janalhac) is a commune in the Creuse department in the Nouvelle-Aquitaine region in central France.

== Geography ==
A farming area comprising the village and several small hamlets situated by the banks of the small Leyrenne river, some 16 miles (26 km) southwest of Guéret at the junction of the D10, D50 and the D61 roads.

== Population ==
Historical population
Year	Pop.	±% p.a.
1968	663	—
1975	545	−2.76%
1982	470	−2.09%
1990	404	−1.87%
1999	367	−1.06%
2007	354	−0.45%
2012	349	−0.28%
2017	330	−1.11%
2023	317	−0.67%
Source: INSEE

== Sights ==
- The church of St. Saturnine, dating from the nineteenth century.
- The ruins of a feudal castle at the hamlet of Soliers.
- A fifteenth-century chapel.

== International relations ==
Janaillat is twinned with: Ennery, Moselle, France, since 1994

== Personalities ==
- The poet François Tristan l'Hermite was born here at the castle in 1601.

== See also ==
- Communes of the Creuse department
