= Saint-Martial-le-Mont =

Commune in Nouvelle-Aquitaine, France

- Commune
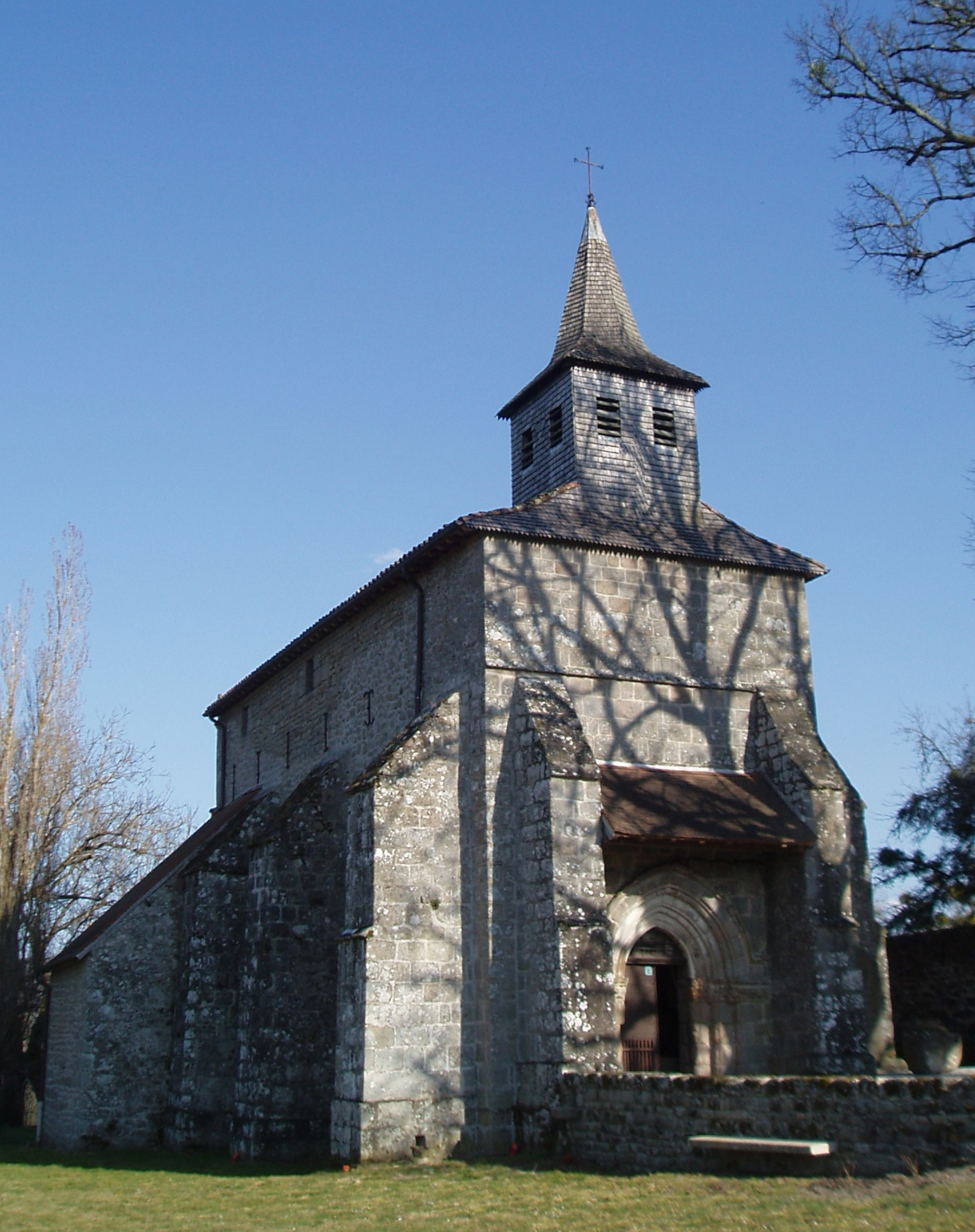
- The church of Saint-Martial, in Saint-Martial-le-Mont

- Coat of arms
- Location of Saint-Martial-le-Mont
- Location within France Location within Nouvelle-Aquitaine
- Coordinates: 46°03′01″N 2°05′39″E
- Country: France
- Region: Nouvelle-Aquitaine
- Department: Creuse
- Arrondissement: Guéret
- Canton: Ahun
- Intercommunality: CC Creuse Sud Ouest

Government
  - Mayor (2020–2026): Serge Lagrange
- Area^{1}: 10.25 km^{2} (3.96 sq mi)
- Elevation: 400 m (1,300 ft)
- Highest elevation: 508 m (1,667 ft)
- Lowest elevation: 350 m (1,150 ft)
- Population (2023): 265
  - Density: 25.9/km^{2} (67.0/sq mi)
- Time zone: UTC+01:00 (CET)
  - Summer (DST): UTC+02:00 (CEST)
- INSEE/Postal code: 23214 /23150
- ^{1} French Land Register data, which excludes lakes, ponds, glaciers > 1 km^{2} (0.386 sq mi or 247 acres) and river estuaries.

Saint-Martial-le-Mont (French pronunciation: [sɛ̃ maʁsjal lə mɔ̃]; Occitan: Sent Marçau lo Mont) is a commune in the Creuse department in central France.

== Population ==
Historical population
Year	Pop.	±% p.a.
1968	356	—
1975	316	−1.69%
1982	265	−2.48%
1990	255	−0.48%
1999	276	+0.88%
2007	265	−0.51%
2012	223	−3.39%
2017	261	+3.20%
2023	265	+0.25%
Source: INSEE

== See also ==
- Communes of the Creuse department
