= Saint-Avit-le-Pauvre =

Commune in Nouvelle-Aquitaine, France

- Commune
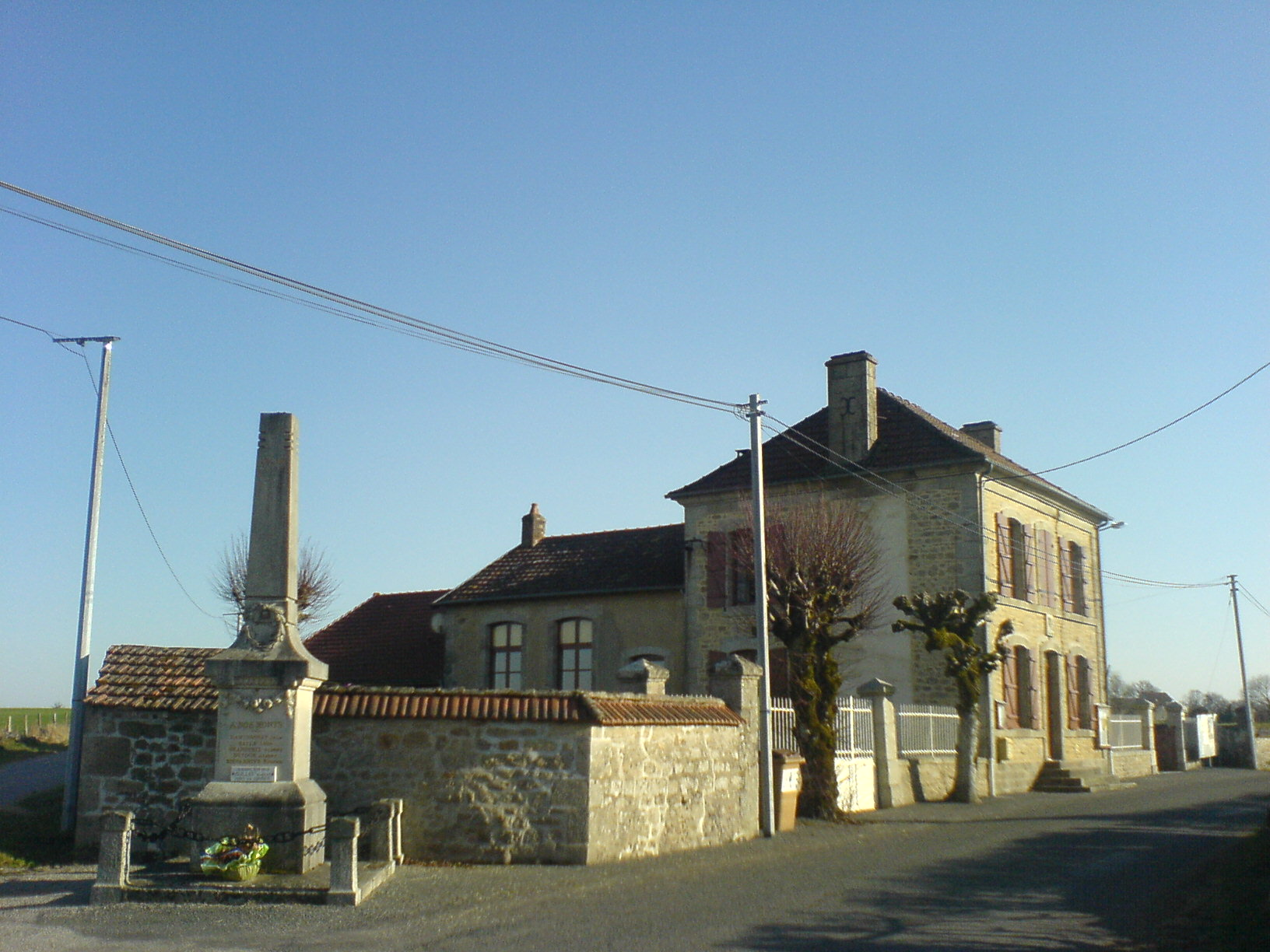
- The town hall in Saint-Avit-le-Pauvre
- Location of Saint-Avit-le-Pauvre
- Location within France Location within Nouvelle-Aquitaine
- Coordinates: 45°59′48″N 2°02′42″E
- Country: France
- Region: Nouvelle-Aquitaine
- Department: Creuse
- Arrondissement: Guéret
- Canton: Ahun
- Intercommunality: CC Creuse Sud Ouest

Government
  - Mayor (2020–2026): Gilles Depatureaux
- Area^{1}: 4.99 km^{2} (1.93 sq mi)
- Elevation: 570 m (1,870 ft)
- Highest elevation: 618 m (2,028 ft)
- Lowest elevation: 529 m (1,736 ft)
- Population (2023): 93
  - Density: 19/km^{2} (48/sq mi)
- Time zone: UTC+01:00 (CET)
  - Summer (DST): UTC+02:00 (CEST)
- INSEE/Postal code: 23183 /23480
- ^{1} French Land Register data, which excludes lakes, ponds, glaciers > 1 km^{2} (0.386 sq mi or 247 acres) and river estuaries.

Saint-Avit-le-Pauvre (French pronunciation: [sɛ̃.t‿avi lə povʁ]; Occitan: Sent Avit le Paubre) is a commune in the Creuse department in central France.

== Population ==
Historical population
Year	Pop.	±% p.a.
1968	104	—
1975	91	−1.89%
1982	76	−2.54%
1990	69	−1.20%
1999	80	+1.66%
2007	76	−0.64%
2012	74	−0.53%
2017	78	+1.06%
2023	93	+2.97%
Source: INSEE

== See also ==
- Communes of the Creuse department
