= Chavanat =

Commune in Nouvelle-Aquitaine, France

- Commune
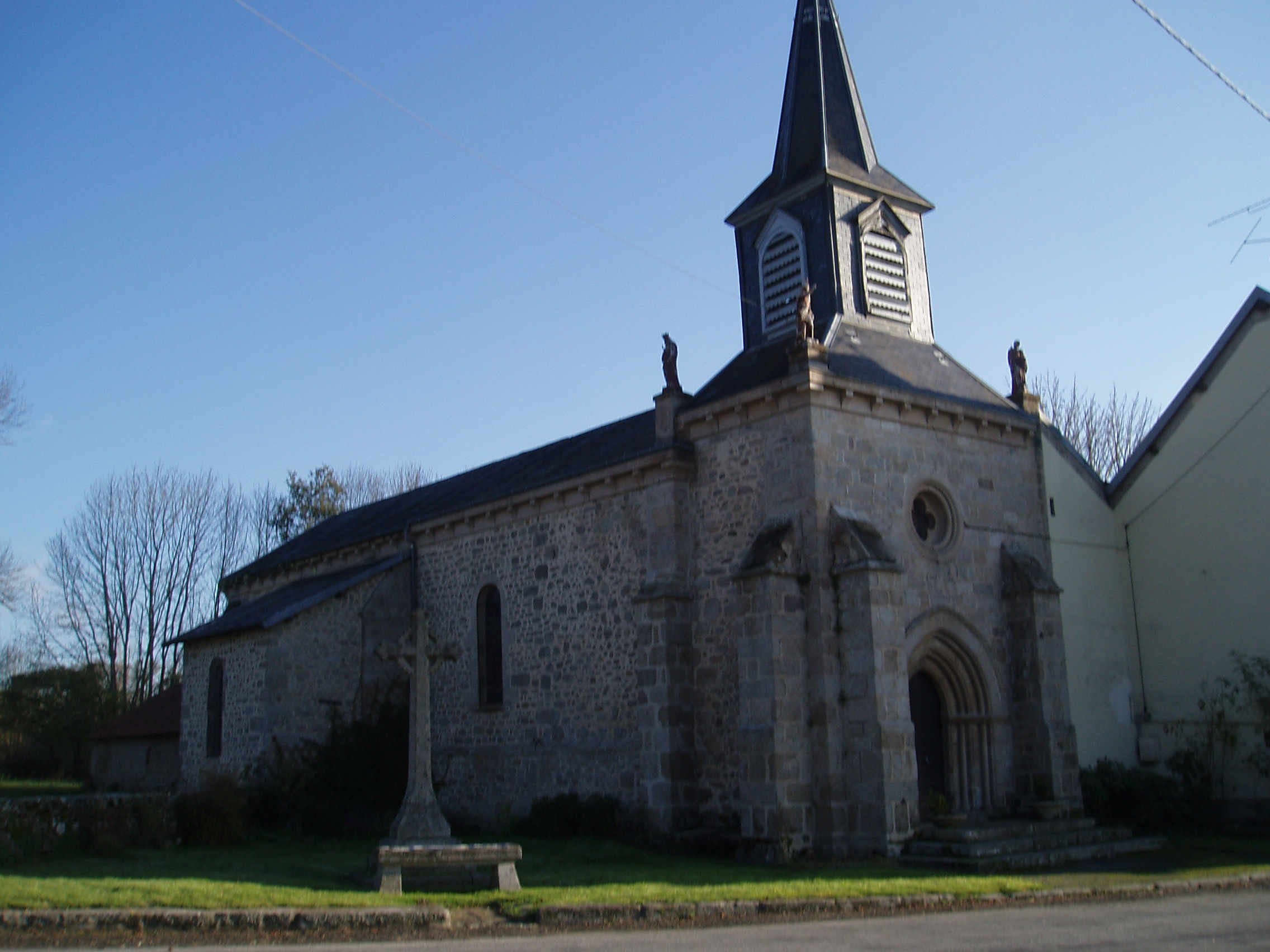
- The church in Chavanat
- Location of Chavanat
- Location within France Location within Nouvelle-Aquitaine
- Coordinates: 45°57′13″N 1°57′54″E
- Country: France
- Region: Nouvelle-Aquitaine
- Department: Creuse
- Arrondissement: Guéret
- Canton: Ahun
- Intercommunality: CC Creuse Sud Ouest

Government
  - Mayor (2020–2026): Gaël Vallaeys
- Area^{1}: 12.73 km^{2} (4.92 sq mi)
- Elevation: 500 m (1,600 ft)
- Highest elevation: 647 m (2,123 ft)
- Lowest elevation: 471 m (1,545 ft)
- Population (2023): 137
  - Density: 10.8/km^{2} (27.9/sq mi)
- Time zone: UTC+01:00 (CET)
  - Summer (DST): UTC+02:00 (CEST)
- INSEE/Postal code: 23060 /23250
- ^{1} French Land Register data, which excludes lakes, ponds, glaciers > 1 km^{2} (0.386 sq mi or 247 acres) and river estuaries.

Chavanat (Occitan: Chavanac) is a commune in the Creuse department in the Nouvelle-Aquitaine region in central France.

== Geography ==
An area of forestry and farming comprising the village and several hamlets, situated in the valley of the river Thaurion, some 8 miles (13 km) west of Aubusson at the junctions of the D3, D10 and the D941 roads.

== Population ==
Historical population
Year	Pop.	±% p.a.
1968	182	—
1975	202	+1.50%
1982	154	−3.80%
1990	144	−0.84%
1999	127	−1.39%
2007	131	+0.39%
2012	127	−0.62%
2017	143	+2.40%
2023	137	−0.71%
Source: INSEE

== Sights ==
- The church, dating from the thirteenth century.

== See also ==
- Communes of the Creuse department
