= Chamberaud =

Commune in Nouvelle-Aquitaine, France

- Commune
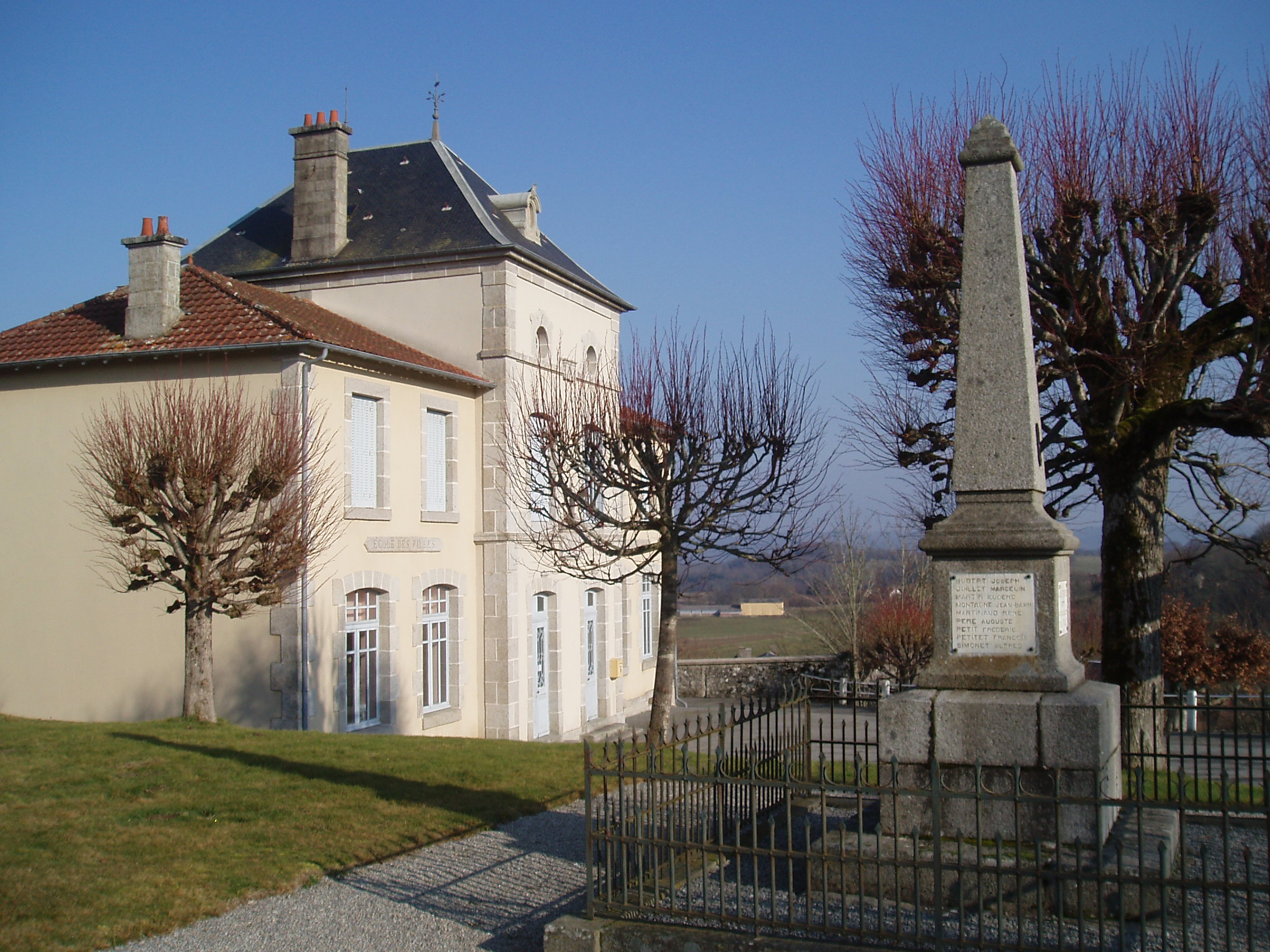
- The town hall and war memorial in Chamberaud
- Location of Chamberaud
- Location within France Location within Nouvelle-Aquitaine
- Coordinates: 46°03′00″N 2°02′47″E
- Country: France
- Region: Nouvelle-Aquitaine
- Department: Creuse
- Arrondissement: Guéret
- Canton: Ahun
- Intercommunality: CC Creuse Sud Ouest

Government
  - Mayor (2020–2026): Gérard Magoutier
- Area^{1}: 7.44 km^{2} (2.87 sq mi)
- Elevation: 482 m (1,581 ft)
- Highest elevation: 586 m (1,923 ft)
- Lowest elevation: 392 m (1,286 ft)
- Population (2023): 94
  - Density: 13/km^{2} (33/sq mi)
- Time zone: UTC+01:00 (CET)
  - Summer (DST): UTC+02:00 (CEST)
- INSEE/Postal code: 23043 /23480
- ^{1} French Land Register data, which excludes lakes, ponds, glaciers > 1 km^{2} (0.386 sq mi or 247 acres) and river estuaries.

Chamberaud (French pronunciation: [ʃɑ̃b(ə)ʁo]; Occitan: Chambareu) is a commune in the Creuse department in the Nouvelle-Aquitaine region in central France.

== Geography ==
An area of lakes, forestry and farming comprising a small village and two hamlets, situated some 10 miles (16 km) northwest of Aubusson near the junction of the D55, D16 and the D79 roads.

== Population ==
Historical population
Year	Pop.	±% p.a.
1968	129	—
1975	96	−4.13%
1982	125	+3.84%
1990	113	−1.25%
1999	121	+0.76%
2007	113	−0.85%
2012	97	−3.01%
2017	101	+0.81%
2023	94	−1.19%
Source: INSEE

== Sights ==
- The church of St. Blaise, dating from the thirteenth century.

== See also ==
- Communes of the Creuse department
