= Le Donzeil =

Commune in Nouvelle-Aquitaine, France

- Commune
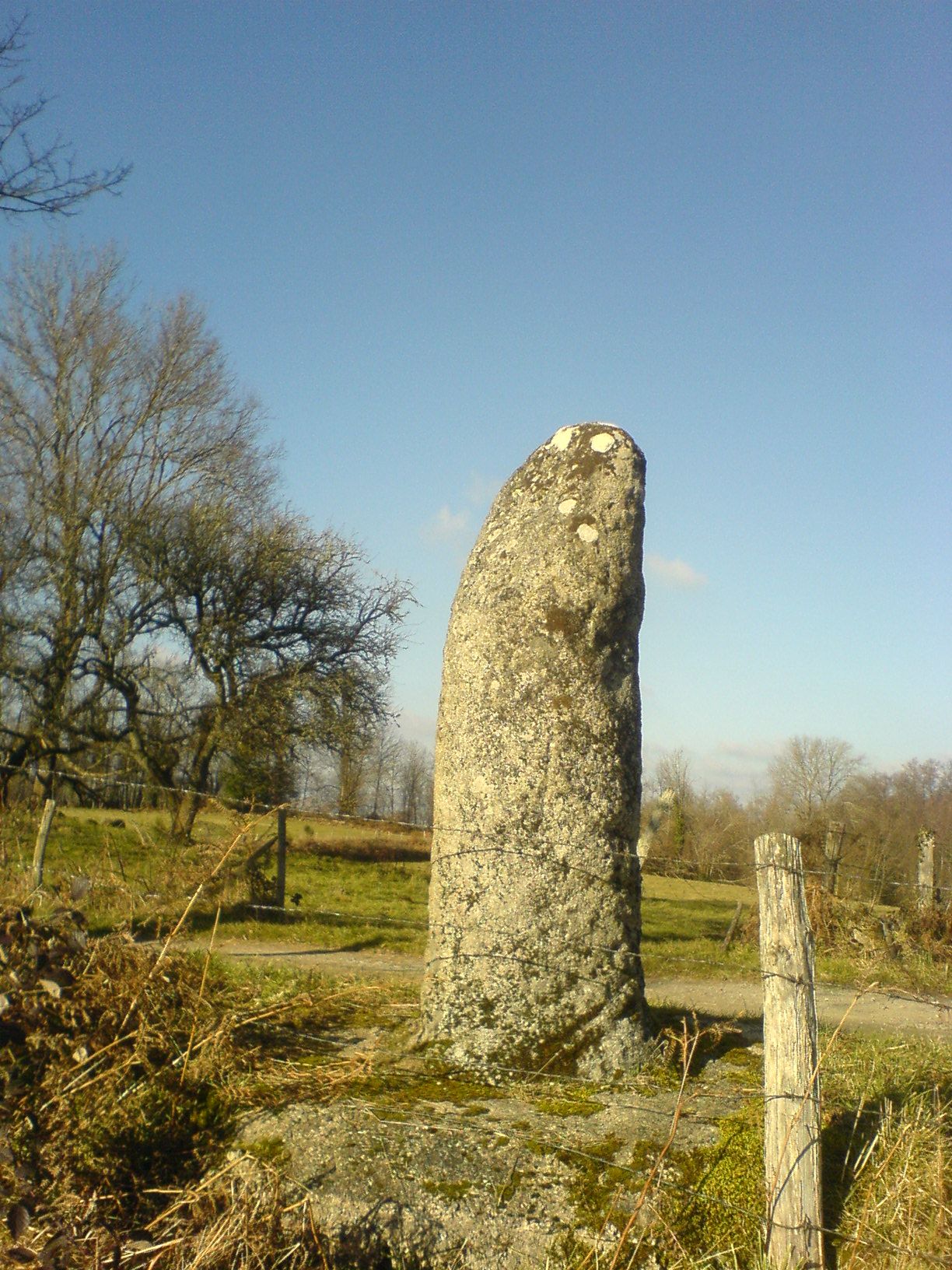
- A milestone in Le Donzeil
- Location of Le Donzeil
- Location within France Location within Nouvelle-Aquitaine
- Coordinates: 46°01′43″N 1°59′14″E
- Country: France
- Region: Nouvelle-Aquitaine
- Department: Creuse
- Arrondissement: Guéret
- Canton: Ahun
- Intercommunality: CC Creuse Sud Ouest

Government
  - Mayor (2020–2026): Bruno Clochon
- Area^{1}: 13.54 km^{2} (5.23 sq mi)
- Elevation: 564 m (1,850 ft)
- Highest elevation: 620 m (2,030 ft)
- Lowest elevation: 508 m (1,667 ft)
- Population (2023): 186
  - Density: 13.7/km^{2} (35.6/sq mi)
- Time zone: UTC+01:00 (CET)
  - Summer (DST): UTC+02:00 (CEST)
- INSEE/Postal code: 23074 /23480
- ^{1} French Land Register data, which excludes lakes, ponds, glaciers > 1 km^{2} (0.386 sq mi or 247 acres) and river estuaries.

Le Donzeil (French pronunciation: [lə dɔ̃zɛj]; Occitan: Sent Saupise le Donselh) is a commune in the Creuse department in the Nouvelle-Aquitaine region in central France.

== Geography ==
An area of lakes, forestry and farming comprising a small village and several hamlets, situated some 10 miles (16 km) northwest of Aubusson, at the junction of the D13, D17 and the D45 roads.

== Population ==
Historical population
Year	Pop.	±% p.a.
1968	283	—
1975	238	−2.44%
1982	210	−1.77%
1990	197	−0.80%
1999	188	−0.52%
2007	160	−2.00%
2012	184	+2.83%
2017	188	+0.43%
2023	186	−0.18%
Source: INSEE

== Sights ==
- The twelfth-century church.
- A Roman milestone.

== See also ==
- Communes of the Creuse department
