= Fransèches =

Commune in Nouvelle-Aquitaine, France

- Commune
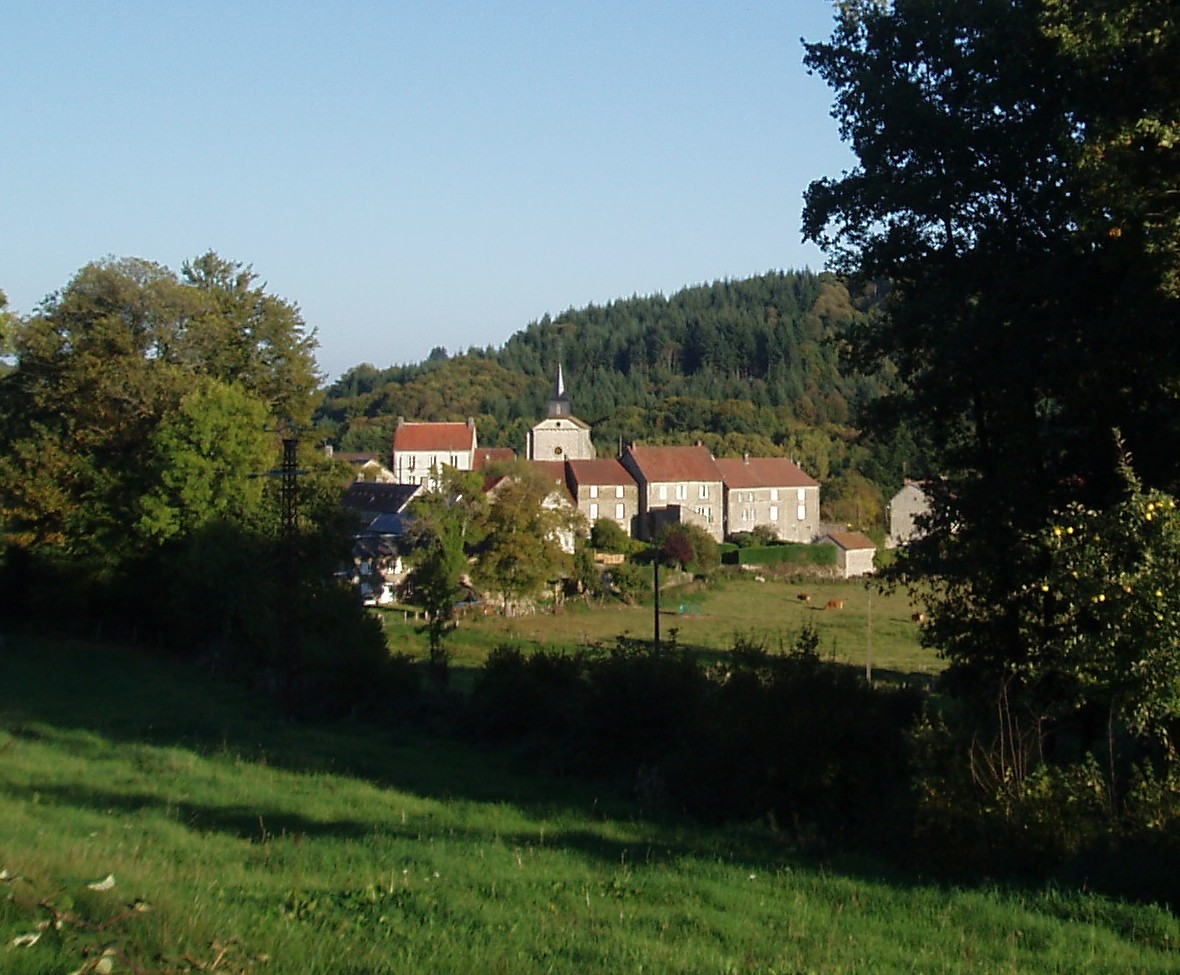
- The church and surrounding buildings in Fransèches
- Location of Fransèches
- Location within France Location within Nouvelle-Aquitaine
- Coordinates: 46°01′10″N 2°03′01″E
- Country: France
- Region: Nouvelle-Aquitaine
- Department: Creuse
- Arrondissement: Guéret
- Canton: Ahun
- Intercommunality: CC Creuse Sud Ouest

Government
  - Mayor (2020–2026): Daniel Delprato
- Area^{1}: 18.29 km^{2} (7.06 sq mi)
- Elevation: 500 m (1,600 ft)
- Highest elevation: 617 m (2,024 ft)
- Lowest elevation: 372 m (1,220 ft)
- Population (2023): 240
  - Density: 13/km^{2} (34/sq mi)
- Time zone: UTC+01:00 (CET)
  - Summer (DST): UTC+02:00 (CEST)
- INSEE/Postal code: 23086 /23480
- ^{1} French Land Register data, which excludes lakes, ponds, glaciers > 1 km^{2} (0.386 sq mi or 247 acres) and river estuaries.

Fransèches (French pronunciation: [fʁɑ̃sɛʃ]; Occitan: Franceschas) is a commune in the Creuse department in the Nouvelle-Aquitaine region in central France.

== Geography ==
An area of lakes, forestry and farming, comprising the village and several hamlets situated some 10 miles (16 km) northwest of Aubusson, at the junction of the D53, D16, D55 and the D60 roads.

== Population ==
Historical population
Year	Pop.	±% p.a.
1968	341	—
1975	287	−2.43%
1982	248	−2.06%
1990	239	−0.46%
1999	267	+1.24%
2007	241	−1.27%
2012	250	+0.74%
2017	242	−0.65%
2023	240	−0.14%
Source: INSEE

== Sights ==
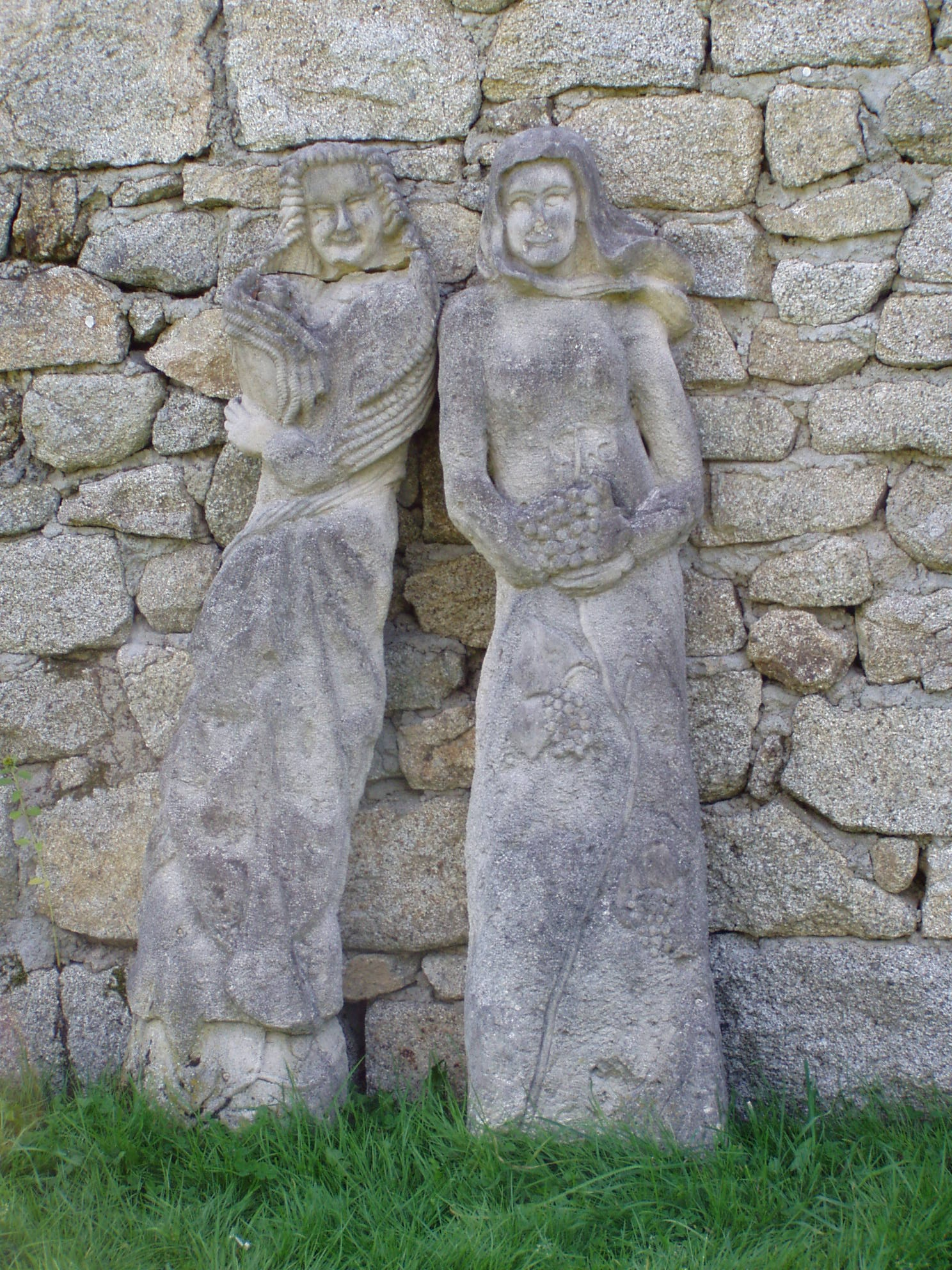
Sculptures at Masgot

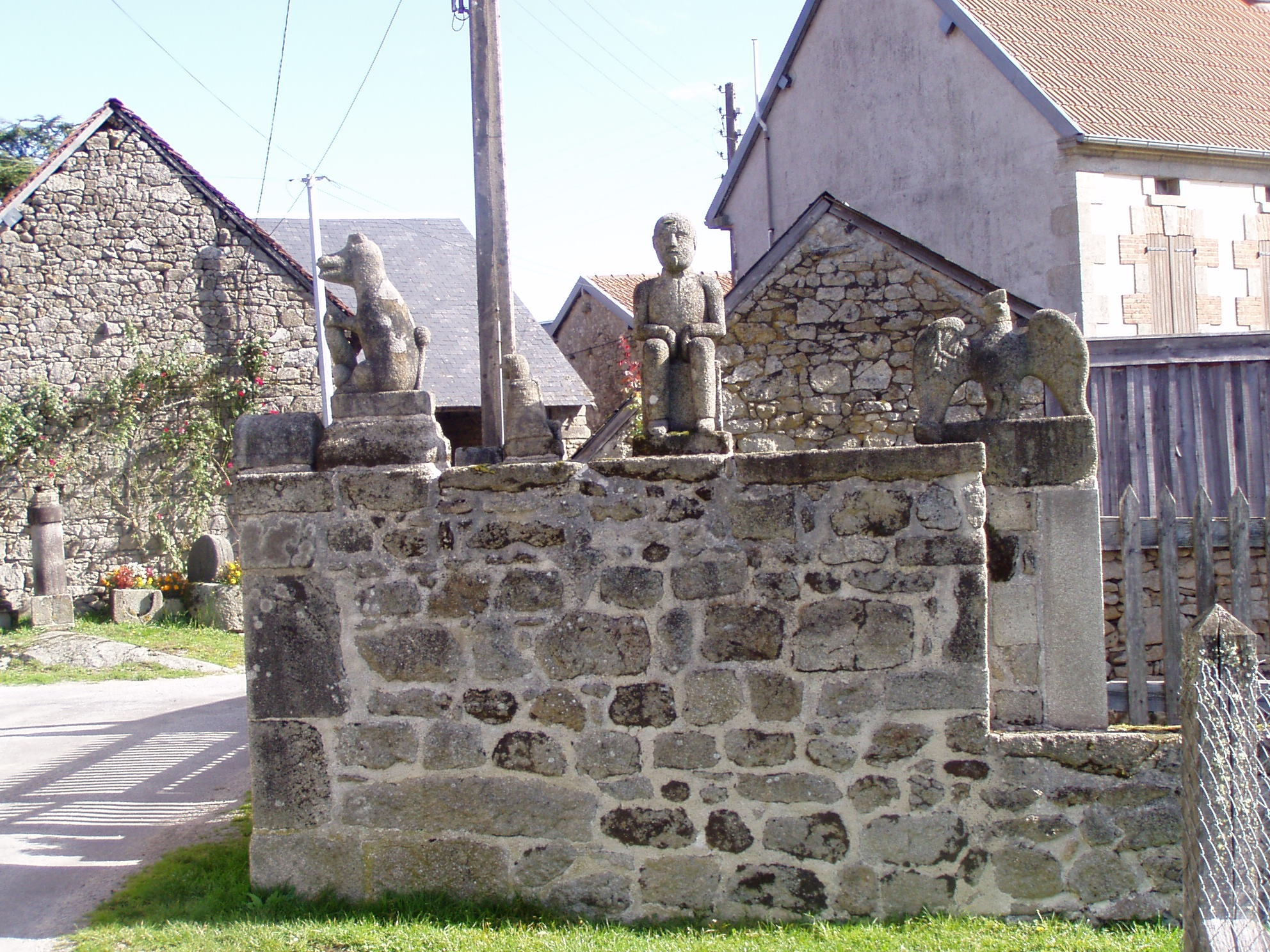
Wall sculptures

- The thirteenth-century church.
- The nineteenth-century sculptures at the village of Masgot.

== See also ==
- Communes of the Creuse department
