= La Chapelle-Saint-Martial =

Commune in Nouvelle-Aquitaine, France

- Commune
- Location of La Chapelle-Saint-Martial
- Location within France Location within Nouvelle-Aquitaine
- Coordinates: 46°01′37″N 1°55′33″E
- Country: France
- Region: Nouvelle-Aquitaine
- Department: Creuse
- Arrondissement: Guéret
- Canton: Ahun
- Intercommunality: CC Creuse Sud Ouest

Government
  - Mayor (2020–2026): Isabelle Colon
- Area^{1}: 10.12 km^{2} (3.91 sq mi)
- Elevation: 530 m (1,740 ft)
- Highest elevation: 606 m (1,988 ft)
- Lowest elevation: 494 m (1,621 ft)
- Population (2023): 79
  - Density: 7.8/km^{2} (20/sq mi)
- Time zone: UTC+01:00 (CET)
  - Summer (DST): UTC+02:00 (CEST)
- INSEE/Postal code: 23051 /23250
- ^{1} French Land Register data, which excludes lakes, ponds, glaciers > 1 km^{2} (0.386 sq mi or 247 acres) and river estuaries.

La Chapelle-Saint-Martial (French pronunciation: [la ʃapɛl sɛ̃ maʁsjal]; Occitan: La Chapela Sent Marçau) is a commune in the Creuse department in the Nouvelle-Aquitaine region in central France.

== Geography ==
An area of farming, forestry and lakes, comprising the village and a few small hamlets situated some 10 miles (16 km) south of Guéret at the junction of the D3, D13 and the D34 roads.

== Population ==
Historical population
Year	Pop.	±% p.a.
1968	162	—
1975	128	−3.31%
1982	96	−4.03%
1990	94	−0.26%
1999	92	−0.24%
2007	91	−0.14%
2012	89	−0.44%
2017	90	+0.22%
2023	79	−2.15%
Source: INSEE

== Sights ==
- The church of Notre-Dame, dating from the twelfth century.
- The chateau.
- Traces of a Roman villa.
- Two menhirs.

== See also ==
- Communes of the Creuse department
