= Banize =

Commune in Nouvelle-Aquitaine, France

- Commune
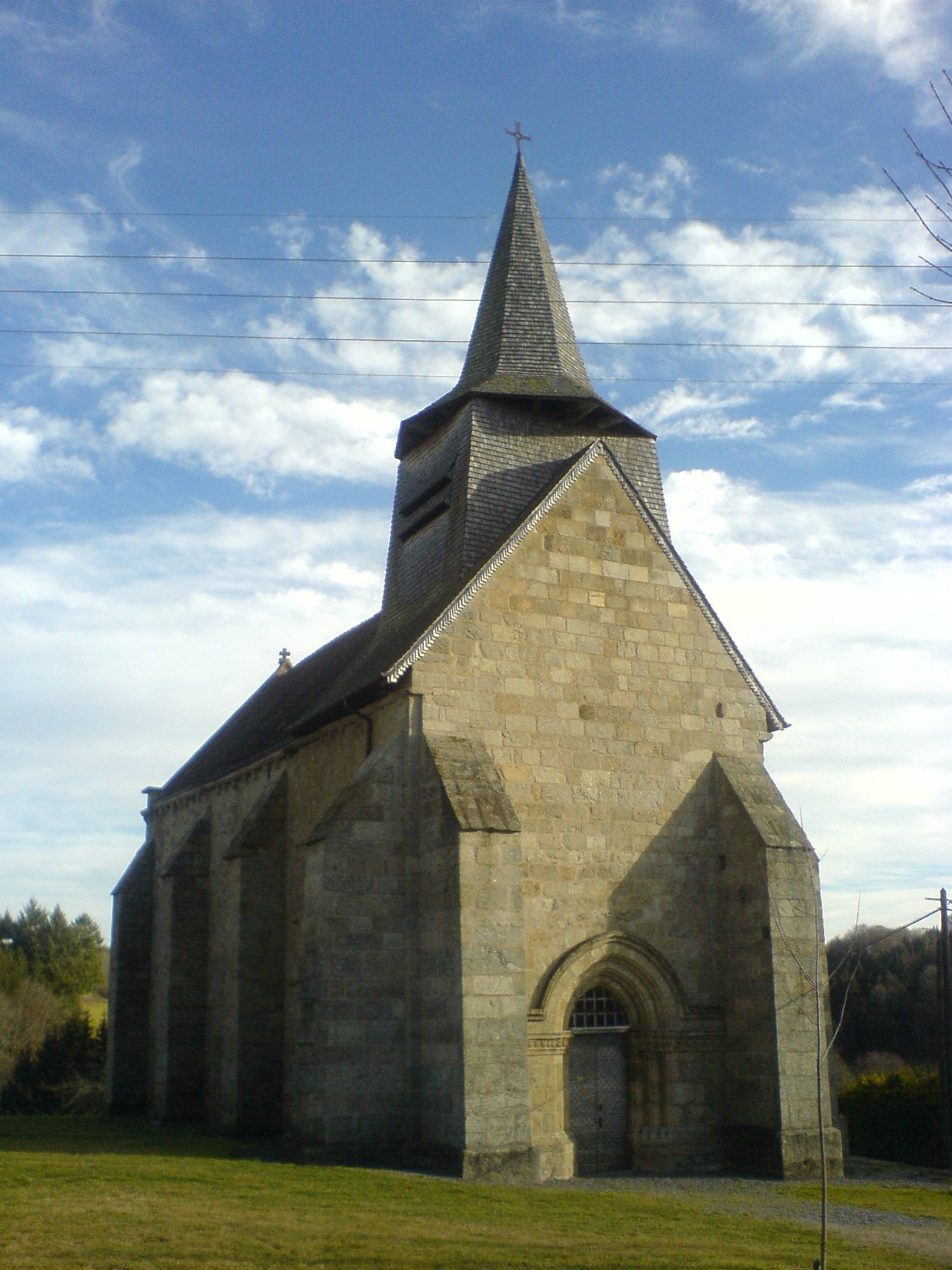
- The Church of Saint-Sulpice, in Banize

- Coat of arms
- Location of Banize
- Location within France Location within Nouvelle-Aquitaine
- Coordinates: 45°55′54″N 1°59′54″E
- Country: France
- Region: Nouvelle-Aquitaine
- Department: Creuse
- Arrondissement: Guéret
- Canton: Ahun
- Intercommunality: CC Creuse Sud Ouest

Government
  - Mayor (2020–2026): Luc Escoubeyrou
- Area^{1}: 15.24 km^{2} (5.88 sq mi)
- Elevation: 540 m (1,770 ft)
- Highest elevation: 653 m (2,142 ft)
- Lowest elevation: 471 m (1,545 ft)
- Population (2023): 183
  - Density: 12.0/km^{2} (31.1/sq mi)
- Time zone: UTC+01:00 (CET)
  - Summer (DST): UTC+02:00 (CEST)
- INSEE/Postal code: 23016 /23120
- ^{1} French Land Register data, which excludes lakes, ponds, glaciers > 1 km^{2} (0.386 sq mi or 247 acres) and river estuaries.

Banize (French pronunciation: [baniz]; Occitan: Banhesa) is a commune in the Creuse department in the Nouvelle-Aquitaine region in central France.

== Geography ==
A farming and forestry area comprising the village and a couple of hamlets situated at the confluence of the rivers Benise and Thaurion, some 10 miles (16 km) west of Aubusson at the junction of the D10 and the D16 roads.

== Population ==
Historical population
| Year | Pop. | ±% p.a. |
|---|---|---|
| 1968 | 225 | — |
| 1975 | 172 | −3.76% |
| 1982 | 174 | +0.17% |
| 1990 | 149 | −1.92% |
| 1999 | 134 | −1.17% |
| 2007 | 156 | +1.92% |
| 2012 | 174 | +2.21% |
| 2017 | 187 | +1.45% |
| 2023 | 183 | −0.36% |
Source: INSEE

== Sights ==
- The church, dating from the fourteenth century.
- Several old watermills.

== See also ==
- Communes of the Creuse department
