= Saint-Hilaire-le-Château =

Commune in Nouvelle-Aquitaine, France

Saint-Hilaire-le-Château Sent Alari lo Chasteu (Occitan)
- Commune
- Location of Saint-Hilaire-le-Château
- Location within France Location within Nouvelle-Aquitaine
- Coordinates: 45°59′01″N 1°53′51″E
- Country: France
- Region: Nouvelle-Aquitaine
- Department: Creuse
- Arrondissement: Guéret
- Canton: Ahun
- Intercommunality: CC Creuse Sud Ouest

Government
  - Mayor (2020–2026): Jean-Yves Grenouillet
- Area^{1}: 19.59 km^{2} (7.56 sq mi)
- Elevation: 459 m (1,506 ft)
- Highest elevation: 590 m (1,940 ft)
- Lowest elevation: 443 m (1,453 ft)
- Population (2023): 224
  - Density: 11.4/km^{2} (29.6/sq mi)
- Time zone: UTC+01:00 (CET)
  - Summer (DST): UTC+02:00 (CEST)
- INSEE/Postal code: 23202 /23250
- ^{1} French Land Register data, which excludes lakes, ponds, glaciers > 1 km^{2} (0.386 sq mi or 247 acres) and river estuaries.

Saint-Hilaire-le-Château (French: [sɛ̃t‿ilɛːʁ lə ʃɑto]; Occitan: Sent Alari lo Chasteu) is a commune in the Creuse department in central France.

== Population ==
Historical population
Year	Pop.	±% p.a.
1968	418	—
1975	356	−2.27%
1982	352	−0.16%
1990	296	−2.14%
1999	276	−0.77%
2007	273	−0.14%
2012	247	−1.98%
2017	233	−1.16%
2023	224	−0.65%
Source: INSEE

== See also ==
- Communes of the Creuse department
