= Arrondissements of the Creuse department =

Administrative divisions of Creuse, France

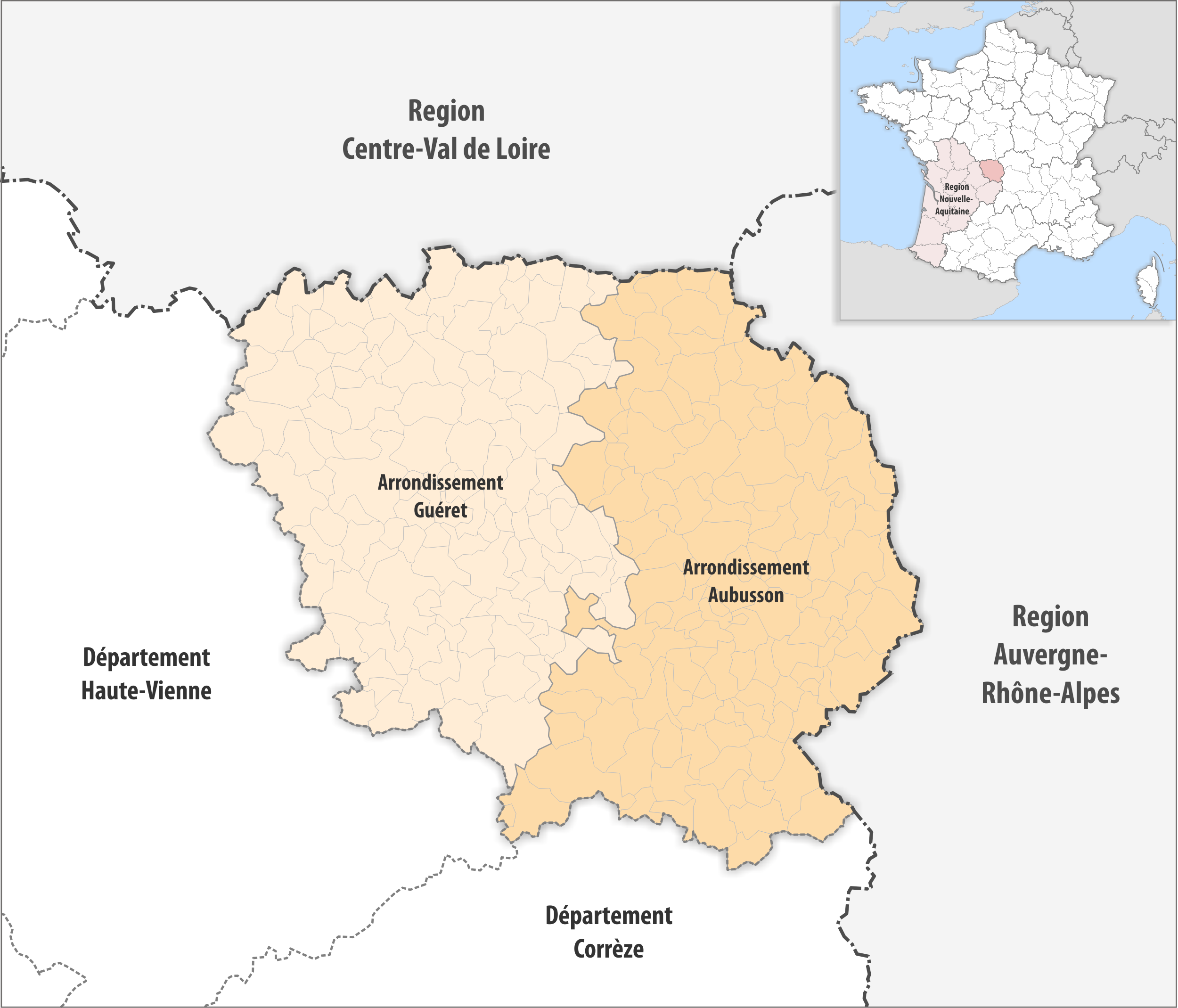
Map of arrondissements of the Creuse department.

The 2 arrondissements of the Creuse department are:

1. Arrondissement of Aubusson, (subprefecture: Aubusson) with 129 communes. The population of the arrondissement was 43,116 in 2021.
2. Arrondissement of Guéret, (prefecture of the Creuse department: Guéret) with 127 communes. The population of the arrondissement was 72,586 in 2021.

== History ==
In 1800 the arrondissements of Guéret, Aubusson, Bourganeuf and Boussac were established. The arrondissements of Bourganeuf and Boussac were disbanded in 1926.

The borders of the arrondissements of Creuse were modified in March 2017:

- 18 communes from the arrondissement of Aubusson to the arrondissement of Guéret
- 28 communes from the arrondissement of Guéret to the arrondissement of Aubusson
