= Vidaillat =

Commune in Nouvelle-Aquitaine, France

- Commune
- Location of Vidaillat
- Location within France Location within Nouvelle-Aquitaine
- Coordinates: 45°57′32″N 1°54′28″E
- Country: France
- Region: Nouvelle-Aquitaine
- Department: Creuse
- Arrondissement: Guéret
- Canton: Ahun
- Intercommunality: CC Creuse Sud Ouest

Government
  - Mayor (2020–2026): Martine Laporte
- Area^{1}: 23.59 km^{2} (9.11 sq mi)
- Elevation: 500 m (1,600 ft)
- Highest elevation: 760 m (2,490 ft)
- Lowest elevation: 444 m (1,457 ft)
- Population (2023): 204
  - Density: 8.65/km^{2} (22.4/sq mi)
- Time zone: UTC+01:00 (CET)
  - Summer (DST): UTC+02:00 (CEST)
- INSEE/Postal code: 23260 /23250
- ^{1} French Land Register data, which excludes lakes, ponds, glaciers > 1 km^{2} (0.386 sq mi or 247 acres) and river estuaries.

Vidaillat (French pronunciation: [vidaja]; Occitan: Vidalhac) is a commune in the Creuse department in the Nouvelle-Aquitaine region in central France.

== Geography ==
A forestry and farming area comprising the village and several hamlets situated in the valley of the Thaurion river, some 15 miles (24 km) south of Guéret at the junction of the D34, D36 and the D45 roads.

== Population ==
Historical population
Year	Pop.	±% p.a.
1968	305	—
1975	225	−4.25%
1982	223	−0.13%
1990	183	−2.44%
1999	162	−1.35%
2007	174	+0.90%
2012	165	−1.06%
2017	157	−0.99%
2023	204	+4.46%
Source: INSEE

== Sights ==
- The church, dating from the fourteenth century.
- Remains of a motte and bailey castle at Creux-du-Renard.
- Two memorials to members of the French Resistance.

== See also ==
- Communes of the Creuse department
