= Grivel (surname) =

Grivel is a French surname. Notable people with the surname include:

- Guillaume Grivel (1735– 1810), French writer, legislator and educator
- Jean Grivel, (1560—1624), jurist from Franche-Comté
- Jean-Baptiste Grivel (1778 – 1869), rear admiral in the French Navy and naval writer
- Louis Grivel (1901 –1969), Swiss writer
- Philippe Grivel (born 1964), Swiss former cyclist

== See also ==
- Grivel (disambiguation)
