= François de Grenaille =

French writer

François de Grenaille (1616–1680), sieur de Chatonnières, was a French writer.

== Life ==
Grenaille was born in Uzerche. A monk at Bordeaux and Agen, he left his monastery to come to Paris, where he published several works and was for 26 years historian to Gaston, Duke of Orléans. He won major notoriety, engaging in politics, but his zeal led to his imprisonment in the Bastille for a year (1648–1649). On leaving prison, he returned to château du Puy-Grolier in Uzerche, where he died.

== Publications ==
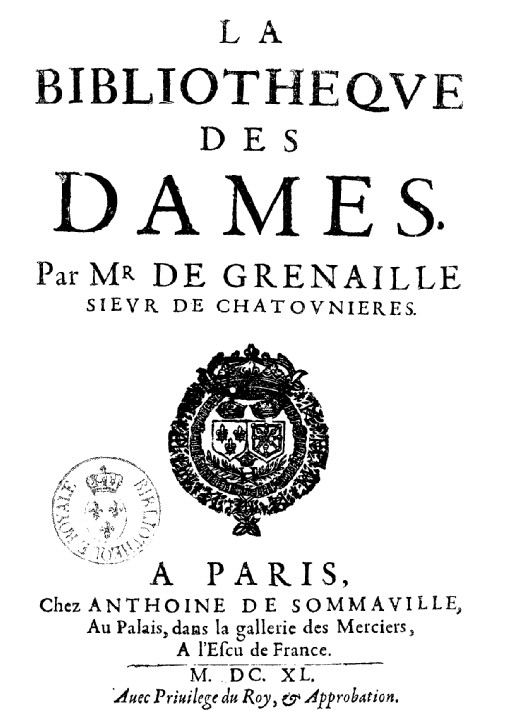
La bibliothèque des dames

- L'Innocent malheureux ou la Mort de Crispe (Paris, 1639, in-4), tragedy
- L’honnête fille (1639)
- La bibliothèque des dames (1640, Antoine de Sommaville, Paris)
- Les Plaisirs des dames (1641, in-4)
- L’honnête garçon (1642)
- Nouveau recueil de lettres de dames tant anciennes que modernes (Paris, Toussaint Quinet, 1642)

=== Translations ===
- La Galerie des dames illustres (1642; translation of La Galeria delle donne celebre by Francesco Pona, 1641).
- Entretiens de Pétrarque or Le sage résolu contre la fortune (1660): free translation of De remediis and other works by Petrarch (Paris, 1678, 2 vol. in-12).
