= Grivel =

Grivel may refer to:

- Grivel (company), an Italian manufacturer of climbing equipment
- Grivel (car), a French car produced in 1897
- Grivel (surname), a French surname
