= Uzerche =

- Commune
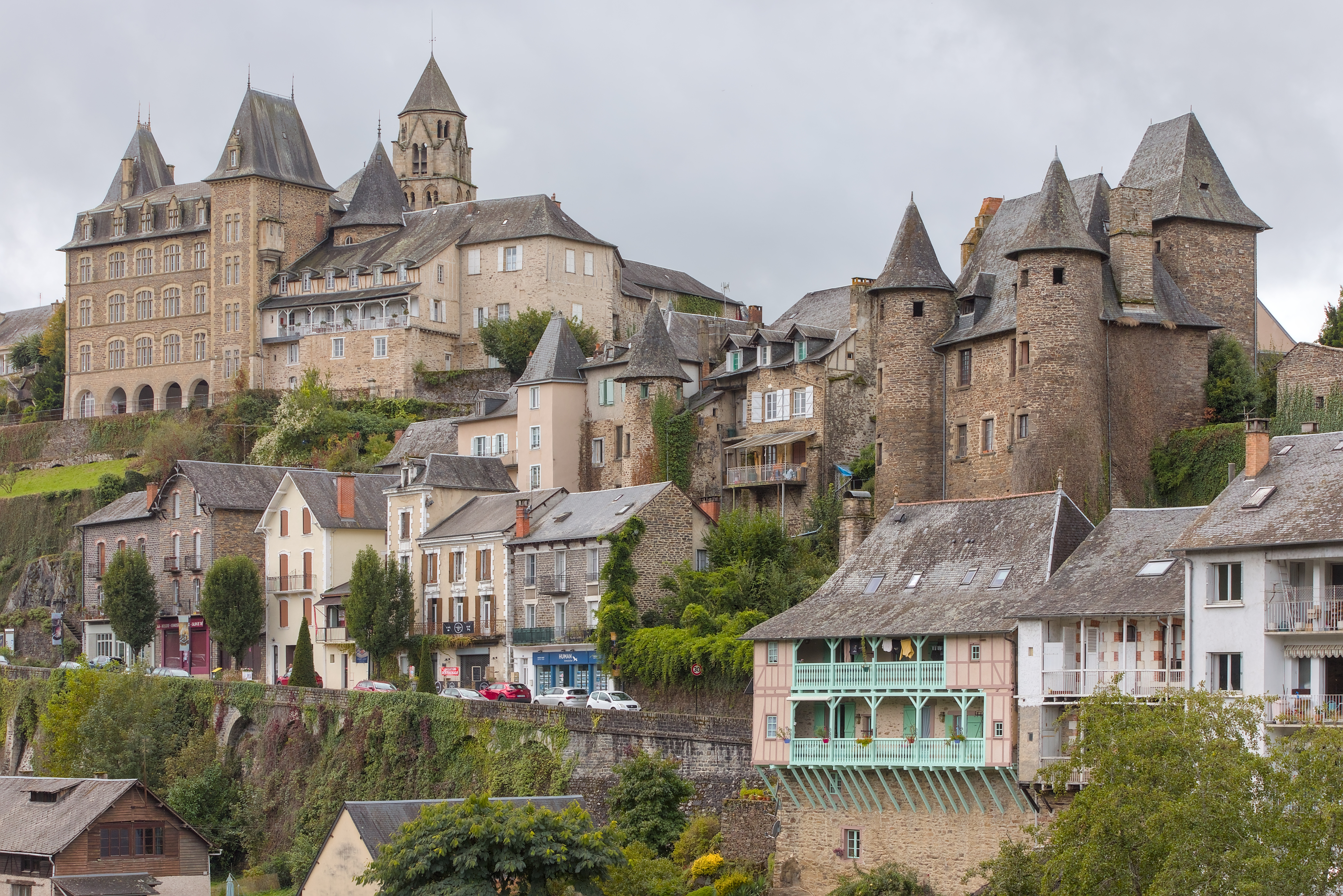
- The historic center.

- Coat of arms
- Location of Uzerche
- Location within France Location within Nouvelle-Aquitaine
- Coordinates: 45°25′32″N 1°33′51″E
- Country: France
- Region: Nouvelle-Aquitaine
- Department: Corrèze
- Arrondissement: Tulle
- Canton: Uzerche
- Intercommunality: Pays d'Uzerche

Government
  - Mayor (2020–2026): Jean-Paul Grador
- Area^{1}: 23.85 km^{2} (9.21 sq mi)
- Elevation: 333 m (1,093 ft)
- Highest elevation: 441 m (1,447 ft)
- Lowest elevation: 270 m (890 ft)
- Population (2023): 2,814
  - Density: 118.0/km^{2} (305.6/sq mi)
- Time zone: UTC+01:00 (CET)
  - Summer (DST): UTC+02:00 (CEST)
- INSEE/Postal code: 19276 /19140
- ^{1} French Land Register data, which excludes lakes, ponds, glaciers > 1 km^{2} (0.386 sq mi or 247 acres) and river estuaries.

Uzerche (French pronunciation: [yzɛʁʃ]; Occitan: Usercha) is a commune in the Corrèze department in the Nouvelle-Aquitaine region of central France.

In 1787, the English writer Arthur Young described the town as "the pearl of the Limousin" because of its picturesque setting. Built on a defensible rocky outcrop in an oxbow of the river Vézère, and located at a medieval crossroads, Uzerche has a long cultural heritage. Under Pepin the Short, the city was the seat of an influential abbey and a seneschal. Uzerche still has many castles, hotels, and other buildings displaying turrets built by the Uzechoise nobility, thus adding weight to the saying "He who owns a house in Uzerche has a castle in the Limousin." In 1996 Uzerche was awarded "village étape" status and, since 2010, has been listed among the towns of France to be worthy of a "plus beaux détour".

The commune is listed as a Village étape.

== Name ==
The name Uzerche may date as far back as Roman times. Taken by the Romans in 51 BC, it was the last place where the Gauls fought against Julius Caesar. The first clear proof of the name dates to the seventh century AD, when the town was known as Usarca. In 848 the name became Usercensium, and in 1190 Uzercha. Between the 15th and 18th centuries the name evolved from Usarche to Userche and eventually to the current spelling.

== Location ==
Uzerche is located in west-central France, on the west flank of the Massif Central. Both the rivers Bradascou and Vézère, with their sources in the plateau of Millevaches, pass through Uzerche and feed into the Dordogne. The Plateau de Millevaches (a thousand springs), not far from Uzerche, is a natural wetland with its many streams and lakes, forest and heathland. It is 500– 900 meters above sea level with its highest point Mont Bessou (976 meters above sea level). Uzerche is a hill town, built above a deeply incised meander of the Vézère River; as such it is a natural citadel. The construction of the gardens along the Vézère, supported by little walls, are as noteworthy as the town's unique position and particular architectural features. As the rocky ground originally made it unsuitable for agriculture, the view of the lower part of the town is dominated by flowers, orchards and vegetable gardens.

== History ==
=== Strategic location ===
By the 2nd century BC, Gauls had taken advantage of the strategic location of present-day Uzerche—on high ground surrounded by a river—and established a settlement there. The site overlooks the nearby hill of Saint Eulalie, a place of pilgrimage dedicated to the 3rd-century Spanish martyr Saint Eulalie. Since before Roman times, Uzerche was situated at the intersection of two trade routes: one connecting Brittany with the Mediterranean Sea, the other allowing people to cross the river Vézère. The importance of this crossroads during antiquity is evidenced by the presence of a castra, or small fortification. Between the 5th and 8th century AD the town developed as an important administrative, religious, and political centre. Due to its defensible location, the town was able to resist many attacks through the centuries. After being looted and destroyed by Visigoths in the 6th century, it was rebuilt in the 7th century with a fortified perimeter wall that enhanced its defenses. In the 8th century, a Saracen force defeated by Karel Martel attacked and besieged Uzerche during their retreat. The siege lasted seven years, but the Saracens ultimately gave up after a last desperate action by the inhabitants. On the point of starvation, they had fattened up the last two of their cattle with the last of their food. They then chased the animals out of the town towards the besiegers. The Saracens, upon seeing the animals, concluded that the city was too well provisioned for them to waste any more time trying to starve them out. To the present day two bulls can be seen on the coat of arms of Uzerche as a reminder of the siege. After the siege against his half-brother Waifer, Pepin the Short, King of the Francs (751- 768), was convinced of the strategic importance of Uzerche and had no fewer than eighteen towers built in the town, the most impressive being Leocaine, which was established as a royal residence.

=== Frankish fortress to the Abbey of Saint Pierre ===
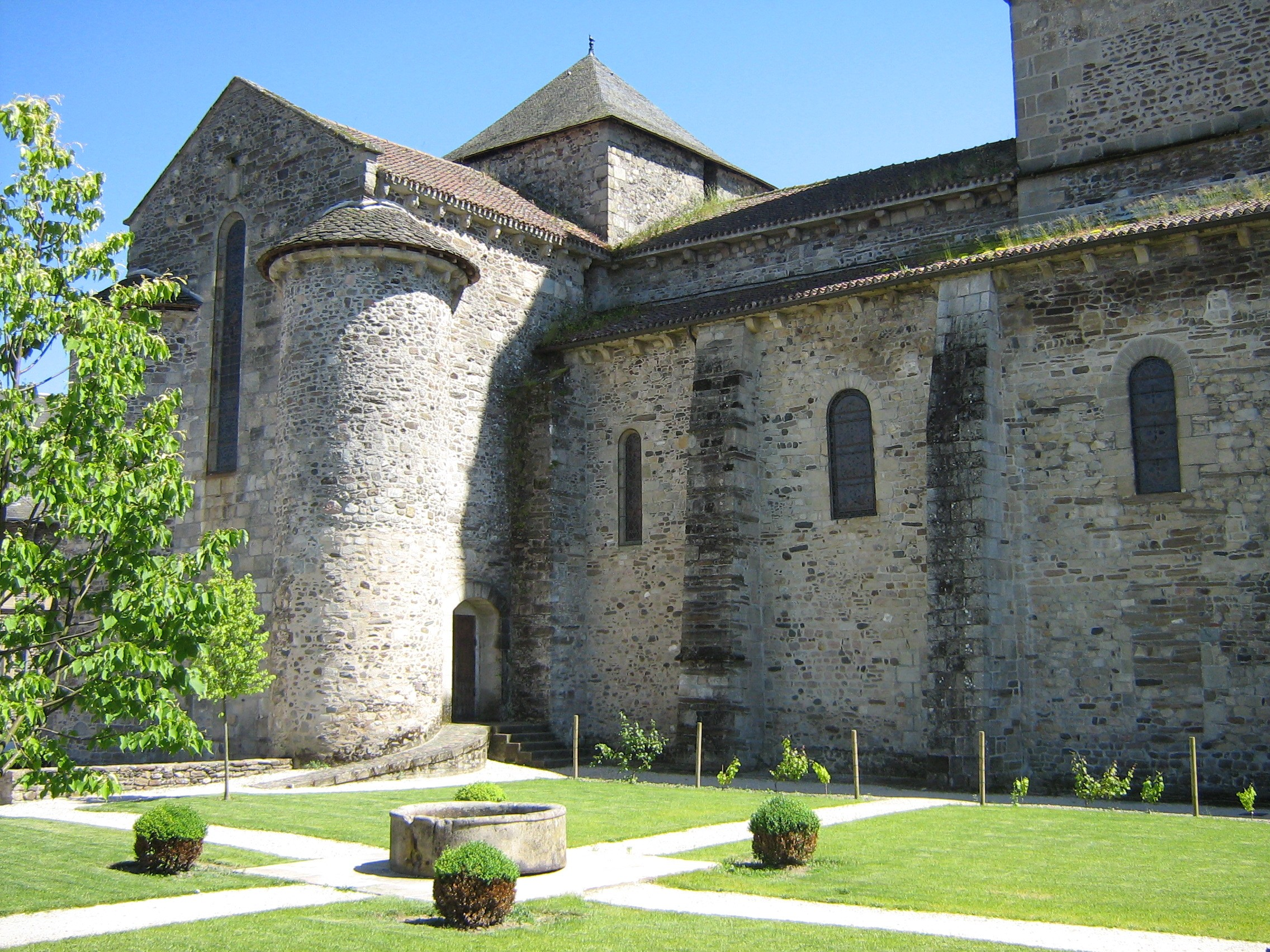
Church of Saint-Pierre

A castrum (fortress) was intended to be a centre for all decisions: military, political and religious. The administrative function of the fortress at Uzerche is verified in the 7th century by the gold coins of that date minted there. Coins continued to be minted there until the 9th century. Uzerche also had an important religious role, with its own curate, as part of the territorial administrative sub-division of the authority of the Count of Limoges. Politically it was the capital of the Gallic-Roman area surrounding it.

With permission of both pope and king, a monastery was founded in the 10th century with the building funded by numerous donations. The city of Uzerche began to take shape around the monastery. All the 100 resident monks were vassals of the abbot and he himself was a vassal of the king.

In 1095 Pope Urban II travelled to Clermont-Ferrand to prepare for his first crusade and also made a visit to Uzerche in the same year. A monk named Maurice Bourdin, who was born in the neighbourhood of Uzerche, set up as an anti-pope from 1118 to 1121, under the name of Gregory VIII.

The Benedictine Abbey was powerful and prosperous with its golden age from 12th to 13th century. Little remains of the original abbey except the church of Saint Pierre, an unmistakable monument to the Roman art of the Limousin of that time and the crypt which contains relics of the two Breton bishops, venerated as pilgrims of the Saint Jacques de Compostelle pilgrim route: Saint-Leonard and Saint Coronat.

=== 10th to 14th centuries ===
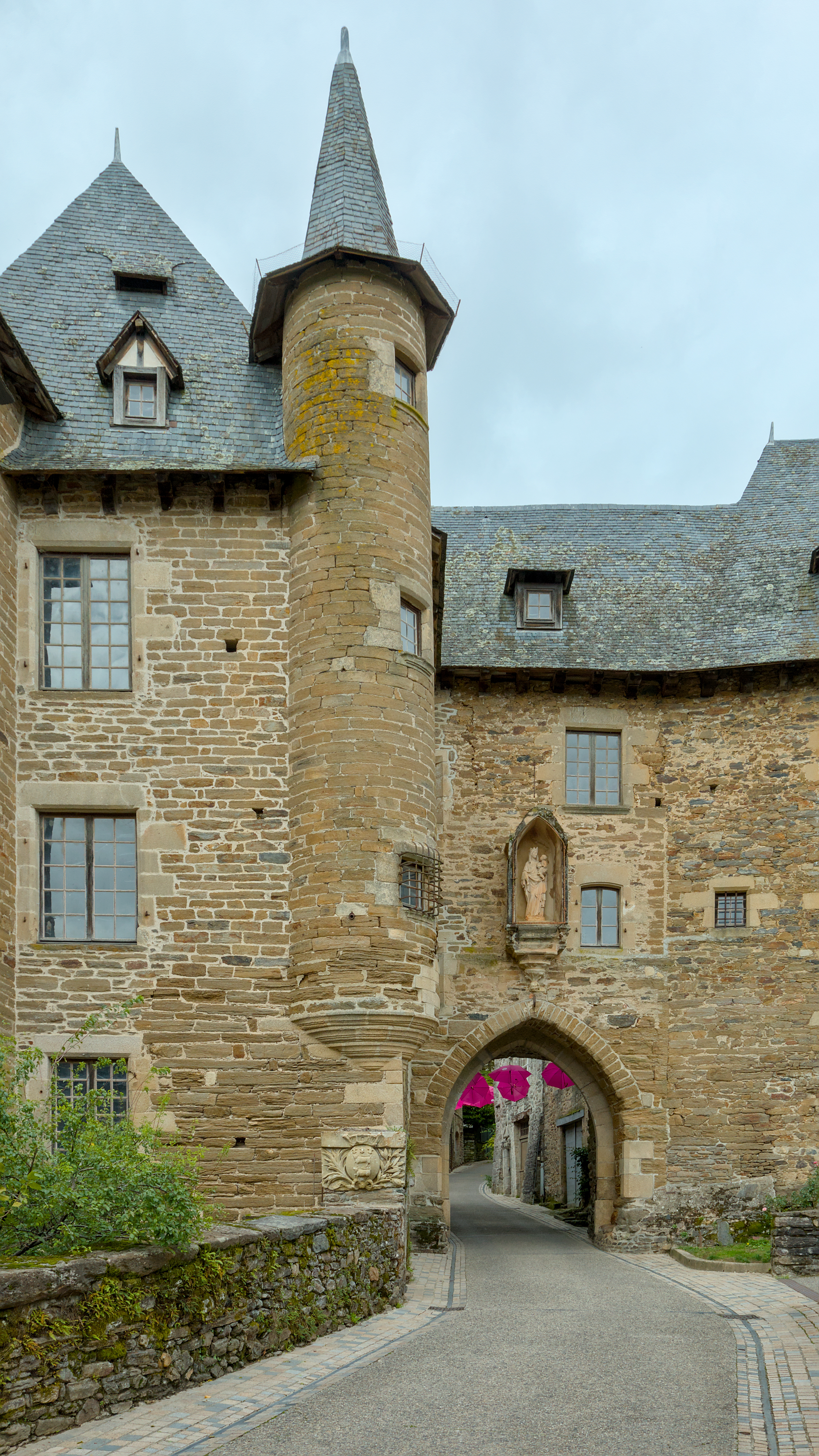
Bécharie city gate

In the year 909 the Normans looted the city. Later, in 992, Archimbald I, viscount of Segur, gifted the 'Chapelle Notre-Dame' to the monks of the Abbey. This chapel still exists in Uzerche at the 'Place des Vignerons'. Around 1159 Uzerche became under the domination of the Normans. In the 12th century another period of power and wealth started for Uzerche. Several important and powerful people came to visit the Abbey; among them were King Henry I of England (1156) and King Richard I of England (1189). The 12th and 13th centuries saw the height of the popularity of the troubadours Gaucelm Faidit and Uc de la Bachellerie who were very well received in Uzerche. The middle of the 13th century saw another wave of important and royal visitors in Uzerche. Louis IX of France in 1244 and 1256, Philippe III of France in 1285, Pope Clement V in 1306 and Charles IV of France in 1324. The bubonic plague had a catastrophic effect on Uzerche, bringing in its wake, death and disaster. Following the old tradition of giving thanks to St. John for protecting them, people in Uzerche, to this day, hang a walnut branch on their front door every 24 June. In 1374 Uzerche had three royal lilies added to their Coat of Arms by King Charles V, as a reward for the energetic defence of the city against attacks by the English. Also in the 14th century, three new fortresses were built and permission was given for the construction of nine gates, giving access to the city. The only surviving one of these gates is 'la Porte Becharie'.

=== Development of the judiciary and royal patronage of the city ===
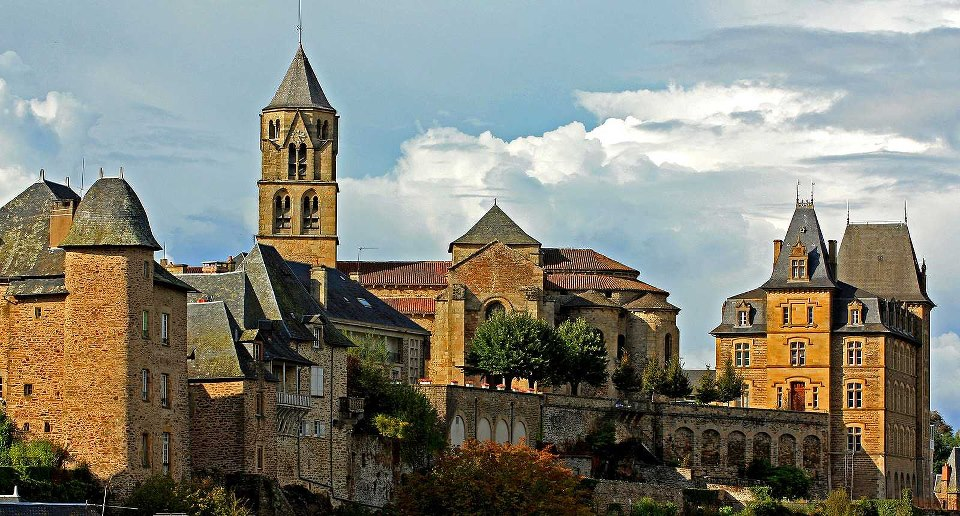
Old town of Uzerche

From the 15th century Uzerche's development went from strength to strength. Louis XI visited the city in 1463 and decided to assign half the seats of the royal assize court from his Senechal to Uzerche. Manly newly created nobles (noblesse de robe) settled in Uzerche, building hostels, great houses and castles such as Chateau Pontier, Hotel des Joyet de Maubec, Maison Boyer-Chammard, Maison Eyssartier, Maison de Tayac and Hotel Becharie. This continued through to the 16th century. To this day the skyline or Uzerche, with its many towers, bears witness to this spate of building. In 1558 the city obtained its Royal Assize Court, rivalled only by that of Brive-la-Gaillarde. The power of the Abbey and the development of the Assize court were responsible for Uzerche becoming the capital of the Bas-Limousin. Despite all this, the Wars of Religion quickly put an end to the prosperity of Uzerche. In 1557 the Huguenots, under the leadership of the viscount of Turenne, destroyed the Abbey. From 1628 the royal officers were the last remaining people with power in the city. In 1753 the bridge Pont Turgot was completed, connecting the suburb St Eulalie with the old town of Uzerche.

=== From the French Revolution to the present day ===
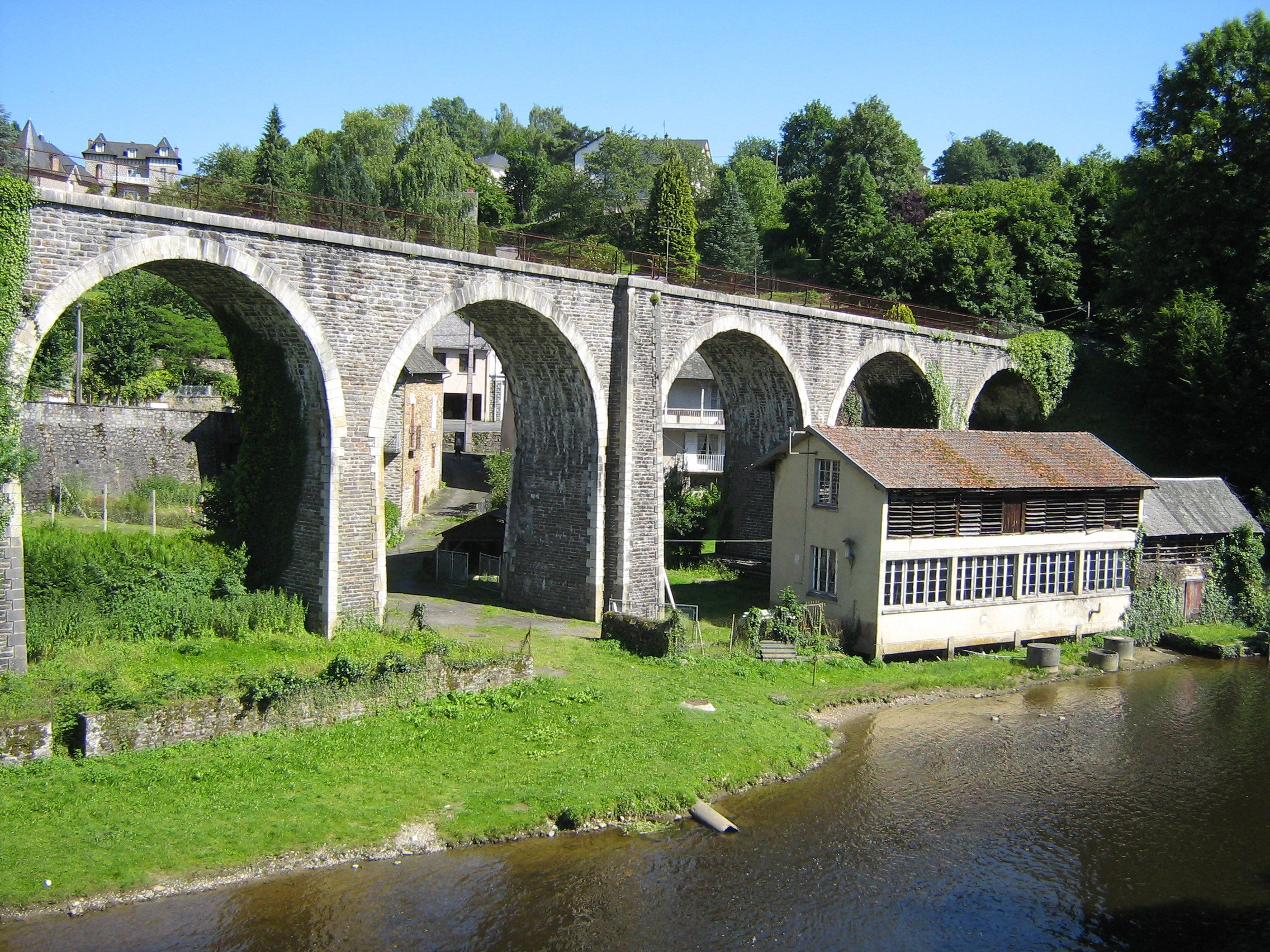
Viaduct of the PO-Corrèze with the tannery next to the Vézère

On 14 July 1789 the storming of the Bastille took place, Louis XVI was deposed and the French Revolution started. On 30 July 1789 rumour spread in Uzerche that the Count of Artois, brother of Louis XVI, was on his way to the city with 16000 soldiers. His army came from Bordeaux and had burned down several towns on the way. Uzerche prepared to defend itself but the rumoured army did not arrive. It turned out to be a trick to get the Uzerchians armed in case it was necessary. The department of the Corrèze was formed in 1790. It was composed of four districts: Brive, Tulle, Ussel and Uzerche. Each of these districts was divided into 41 cantons, each composed of several communes. During the years of the war of the revolution (1792–1793) two Uzerchians distinguished themselves, General Materre and Colonel Vareliaud. Alexis Boyer, also a Uzerchian, became personal surgeon to the emperor Napoleon I and followed him in his campaigns in Poland and Prussia.

In 1826 the commune of St. Eulalie was added to Uzerche.

Planned in 1840 and completed in 1855 the road tunnel remained the only one on the 'route national' for a century. In 1892 a tunnel for the railway was added for Uzerche-Seilhac-Tulle and Argentat. The construction of the viaduct gave a new dimension to Uzerche. This viaduct of 142 meters long, with 12 arches, was completed in 1902 and made possible the connexion of station 'PO Corrèze', north of the city, to the station 'la petite gare' in the centre of the city. The railway functioned until 1969 when it was closed down and is now used as a footpath.

On 5 November 1870, Monsieur Tayac, mayor of Uzerche informed his council of the collapse of the empire and the forming of the Third Republic. On 13 November 1870 the council of Uzerche voted unanimously to recognise and support the Third Republic. After the French defeat in the Franco-German War in 1871 the Third French Republic was announced officially.

In 1939 France declared war on Germany thus entering the Second World War. In June 1944, a day after the first D-Day landing in Normandy, General Heinze Lammerding of the SS-Panzer-Division Das Reich gave the order to choose a place between Tulle and Limoges to break the Resistance. A number resistance fighters attacked a train at Allassac station, liberating the journalist and resistance fighter Gerhard Leo. Among this group was Lieutenant Michel who was later arrested and hanged in Uzerche under the order of General Lammerding.

== Traffic and transport ==
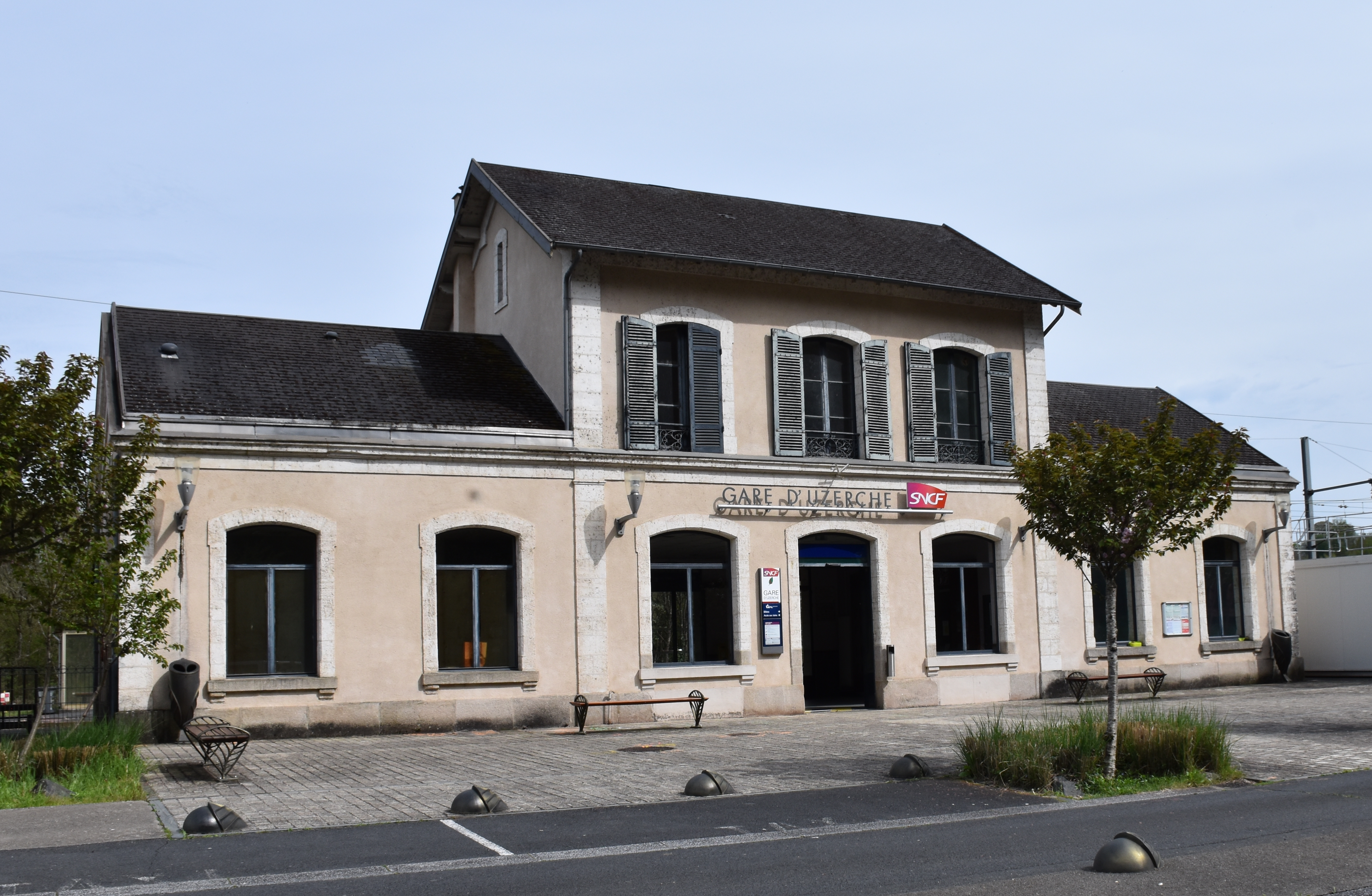
Railway station at Uzerche

The motorway A20 passes Uzerche on the boundary of the town. The departmental road D920 crosses the village in north–south direction. From the A20 there are two exits to the D920 towards Uzerche, exit 44 from the direction Limoges/Paris and exit 45 from the direction Brive/Toulouse. Uzerche station has direct rail connections to Limoges, Paris and Toulouse. The railway station is situated on the 'Avenue de la gare', the road from Uzerche towards Condat sur Ganaveix. In 2010 the railway station was renovated completely.

== Population ==
In 1826 Uzerche absorbed the former commune of Sainte-Eulalie.

Historical population

Year	Pop.	±% p.a.
1793	1,900	—
1821	2,102	+0.36%
1831	3,214	+4.34%
1872	3,022	−0.15%
1891	4,351	+1.94%
1926	3,030	−1.03%
1946	3,575	+0.83%
1968	3,314	−0.34%

Year	Pop.	±% p.a.
1975	3,091	−0.99%
1982	3,097	+0.03%
1990	2,813	−1.20%
1999	3,062	+0.95%
2007	3,195	+0.53%
2012	2,958	−1.53%
2017	2,806	−1.05%
2023	2,814	+0.05%

Source: EHESS and INSEE (1968–2023)

== Agriculture ==
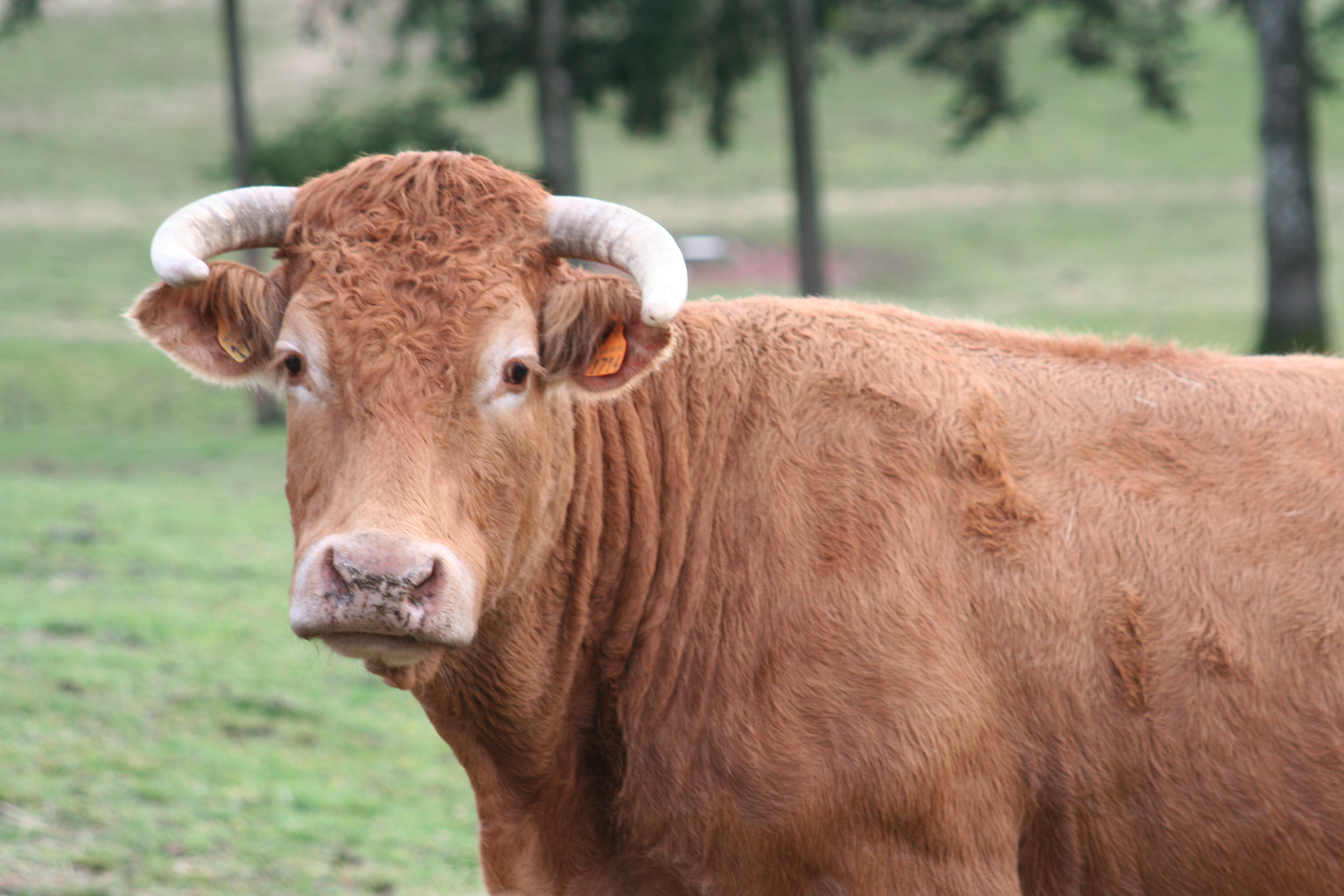
Limousine cow

Between 1988 and 2000, 20 farms disappeared, bringing the total back from 43 to 23 farms. In 2000, most agriculture was largely dedicated to raising animals, with 80% bovine cattle and some 10% other animals. the fruit and vegetable field crops made up little more than 5% of the total agriculture area.

== Personalities ==
Famous Uzerchois

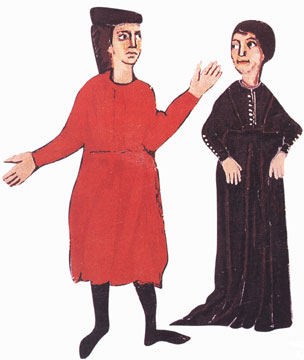
Gaucelm Faidit

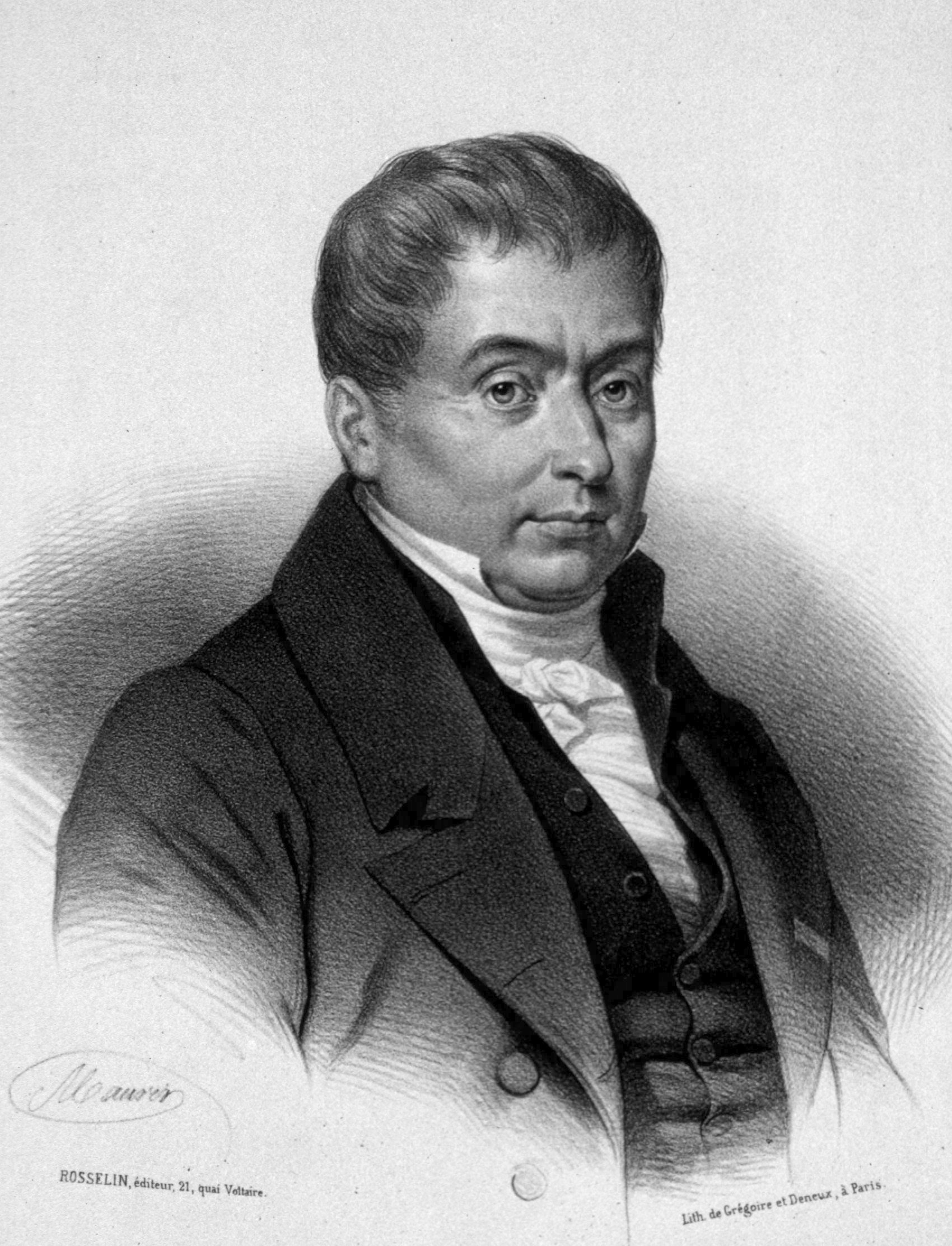
Alexis Boyer

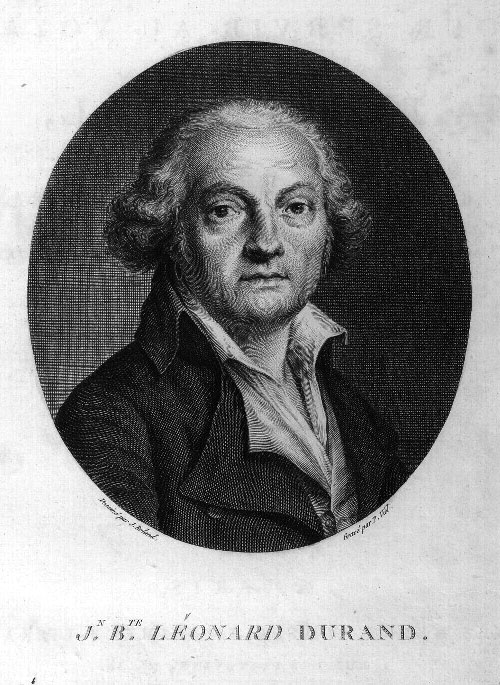
Jean Baptiste Léonard Durand
(on French wiki)

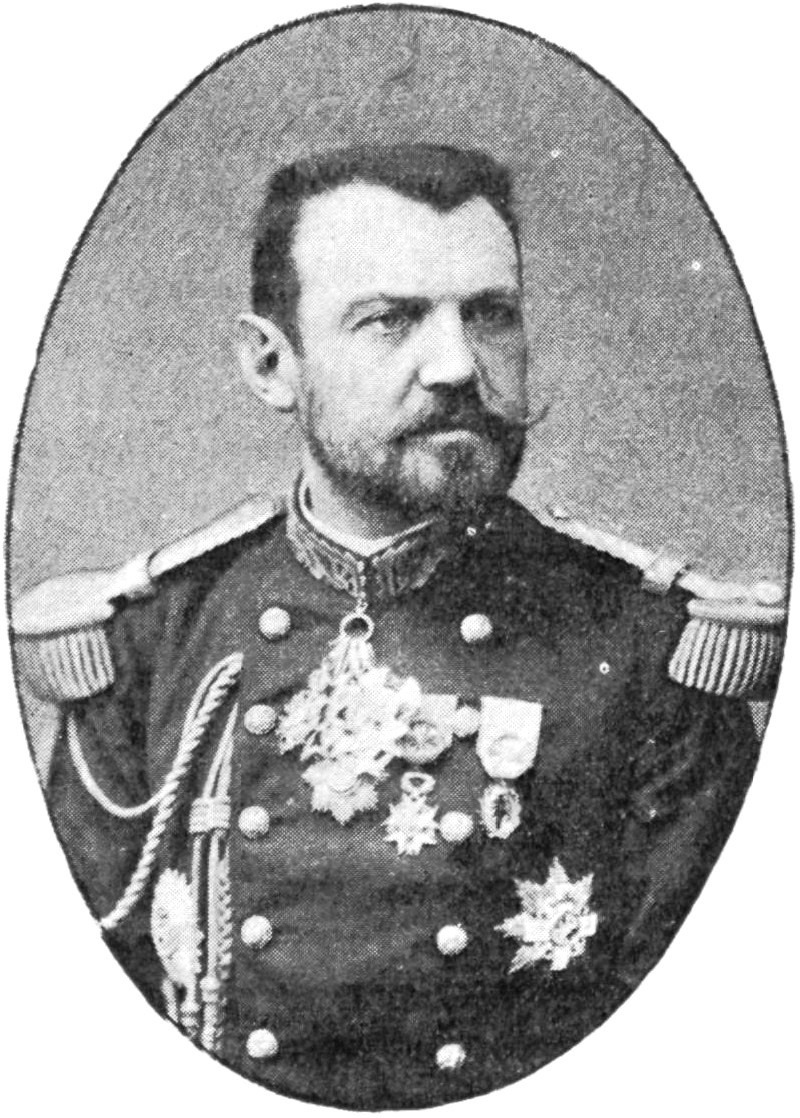
Henri Joseph Brugère
(on French wiki)

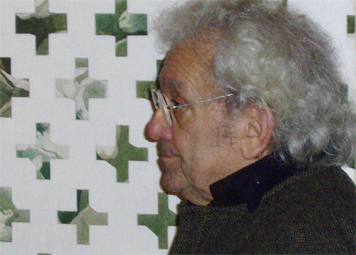
Henri Cueco
- Gaucelm Faidit (Around 1150- to 1205) – one of history's most prolific troubadours, born in Uzerche.
- François de Grenaille (1616–1680) – writer born in Uzerche.
- Guillaume Grivel (1735–1810) – writer and lawyer born in Uzerche.
- Alexis Boyer (1737–1833) – Doctor and anatomist born in Uzerche.
- Jean Baptiste Léonard Durand (1742–1812) – Administrator and ex-Director of the Compagnie du Sénégal, born in Uzerche.
- Félicité de Genlis (1746–1830) – Woman of letters, she ran a woman's hostel in Uzerche from 1782. The action in her novel Olympe et Théophile takes place in the Chateau de Puy-Grolier where she lived.
- Henri Joseph Brugère (1841–1918) – General born in Uzerche.
- Louis Rollin (1879–1952) – Politician born in Uzerche.
- Simone de Beauvoir (1908–1986) – Philosopher, novelist, épistolière, mémorialiste and essayist. During her youth she spent her summer holidays not far from Uzerche at Saint-Ybard, in Merignac a village started by her great-grandfather Ernest de Beauvoir about 1880. The land had been bought by her great-grandmother Narcisse Bertrand de Beauvoir at the start of the 19th century. It is possible to see the influence of this happy period of her life with the companionship of her sister Hélène in her book Mémoires d'une jeune fille rangée. On 24 May 2008 the town celebrated the centenary of the writer's birth.
- Henri Cueco (1929–2017) – painter, artist and writer born in Uzerche.
- Patrick Dumas (1953) – cartoonist, born in Uzerche.

== See also ==
- Communes of the Corrèze department

== Gallery ==
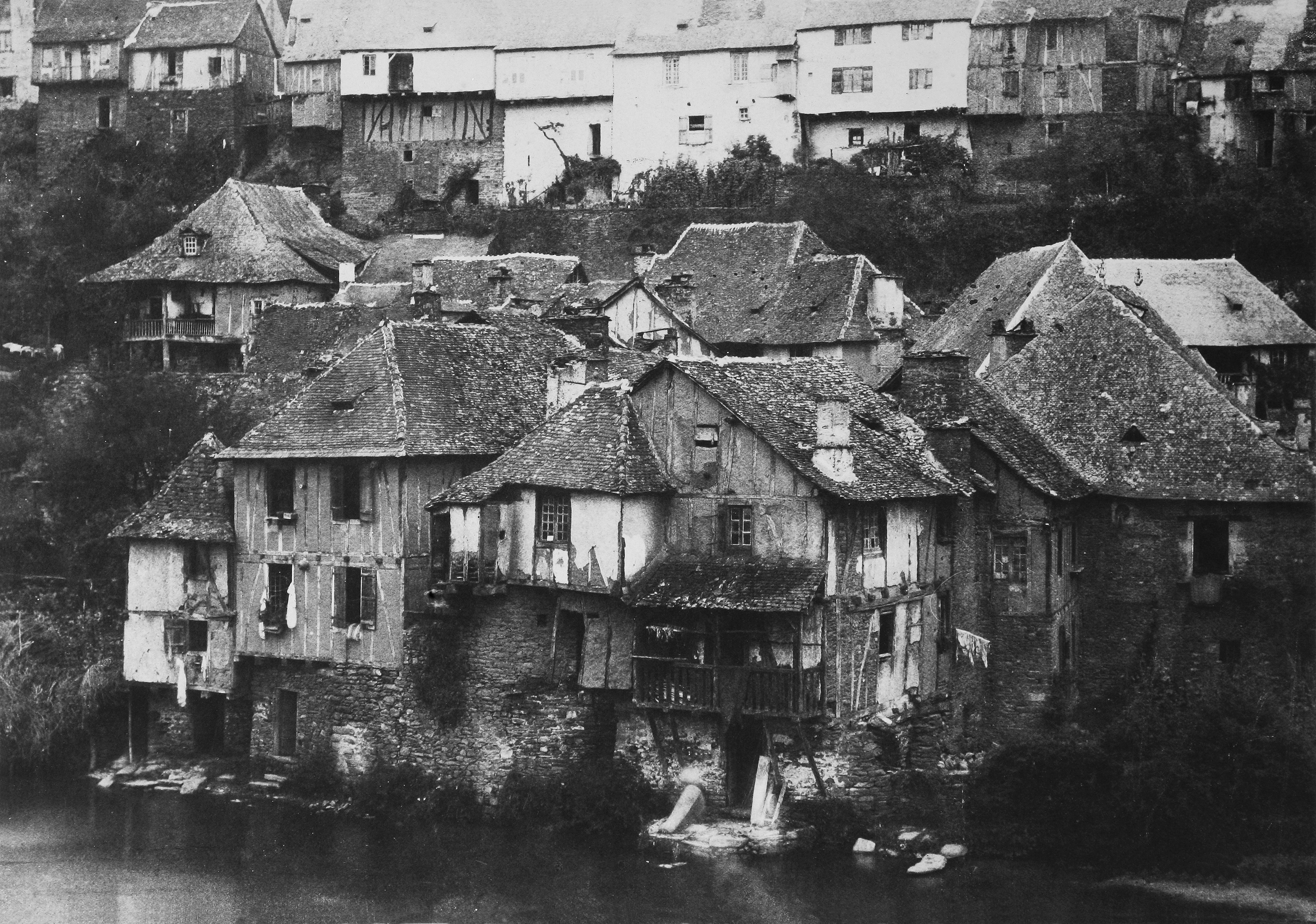
Waterfront by Gustave Le Gray

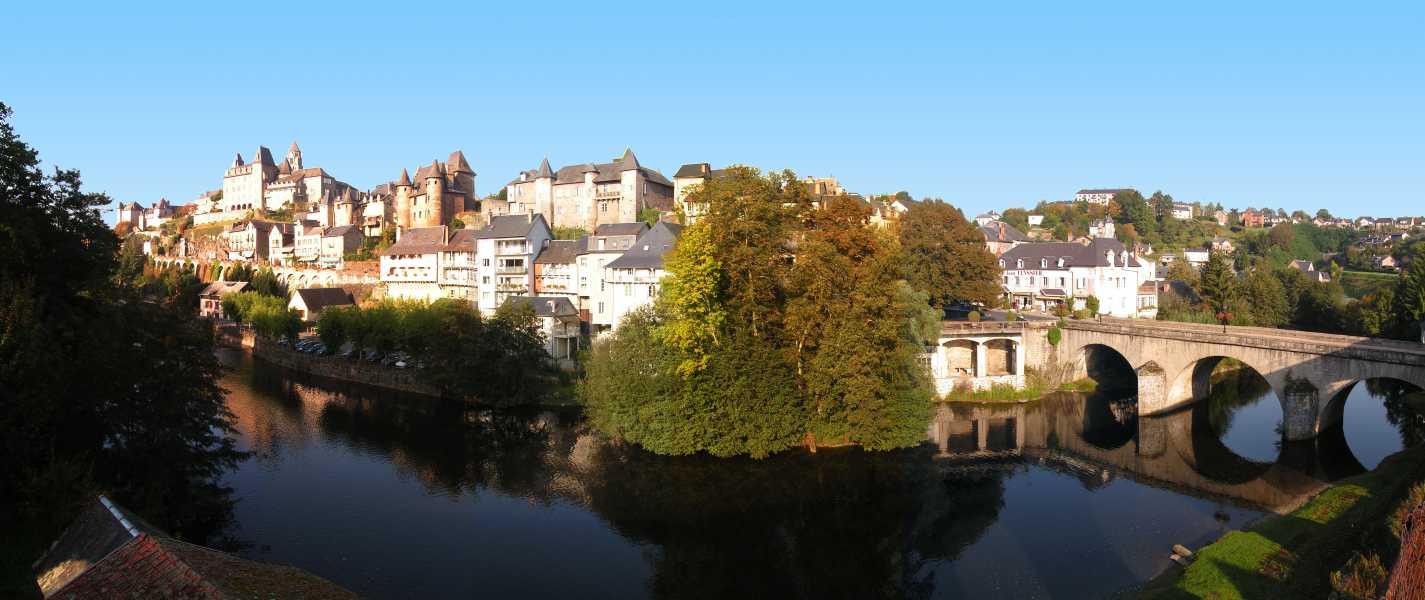
View over Uzerche.

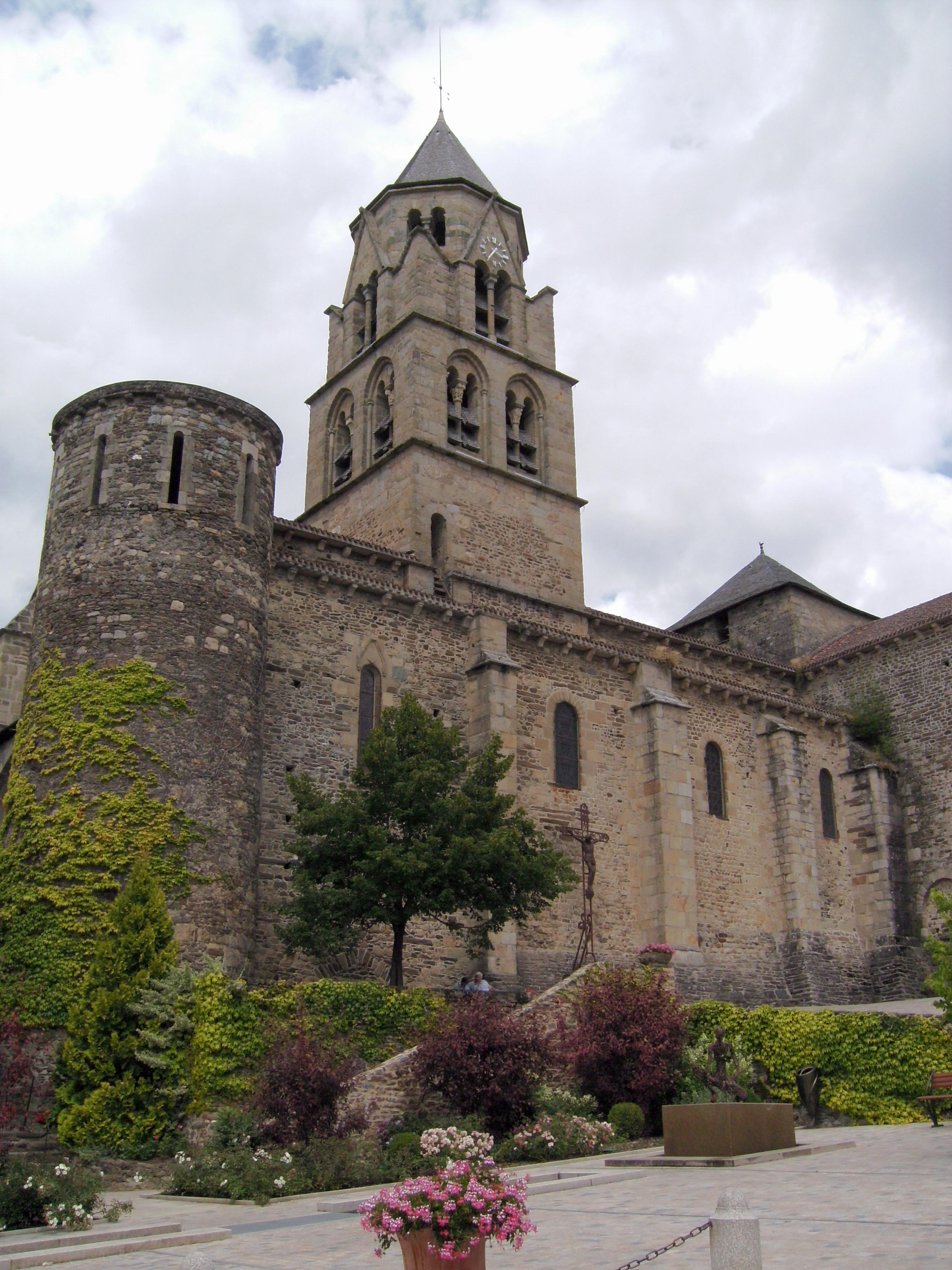
Abbey St Pierre

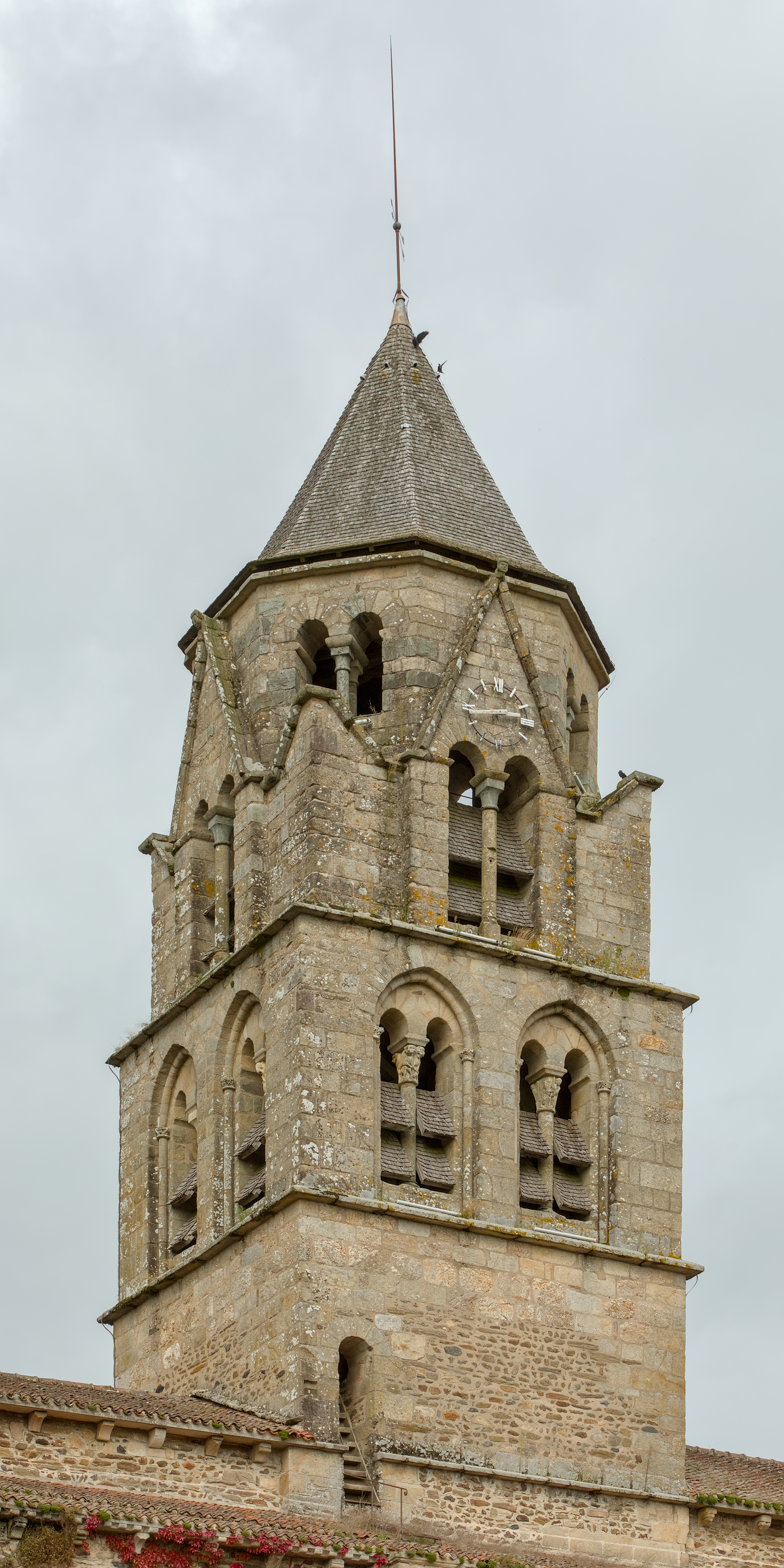
Church tower of Abbey St Pierre

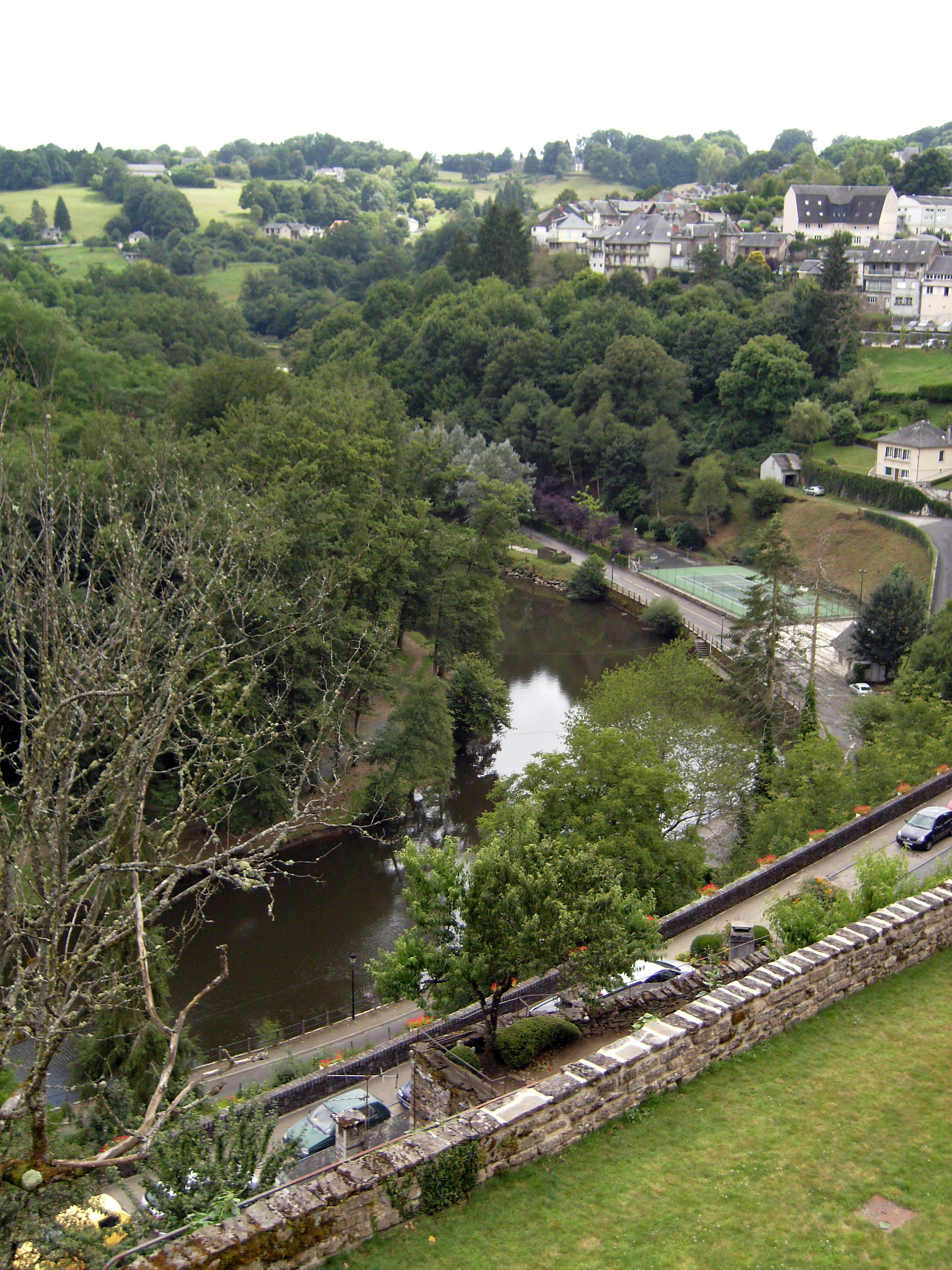
river flowing into Uzerche from the south.

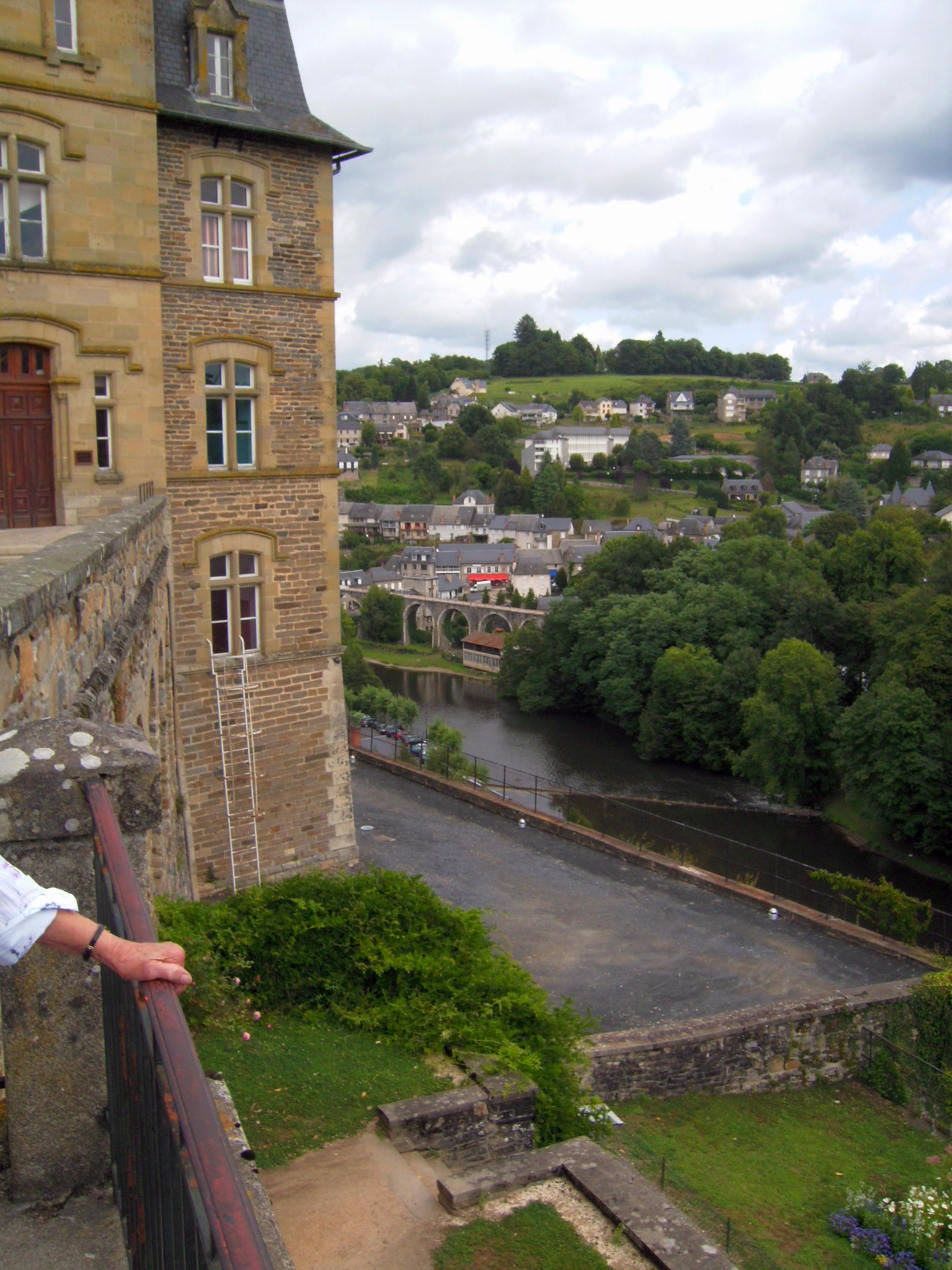
View across Vézère river from city wall, with viaduct clearly visible

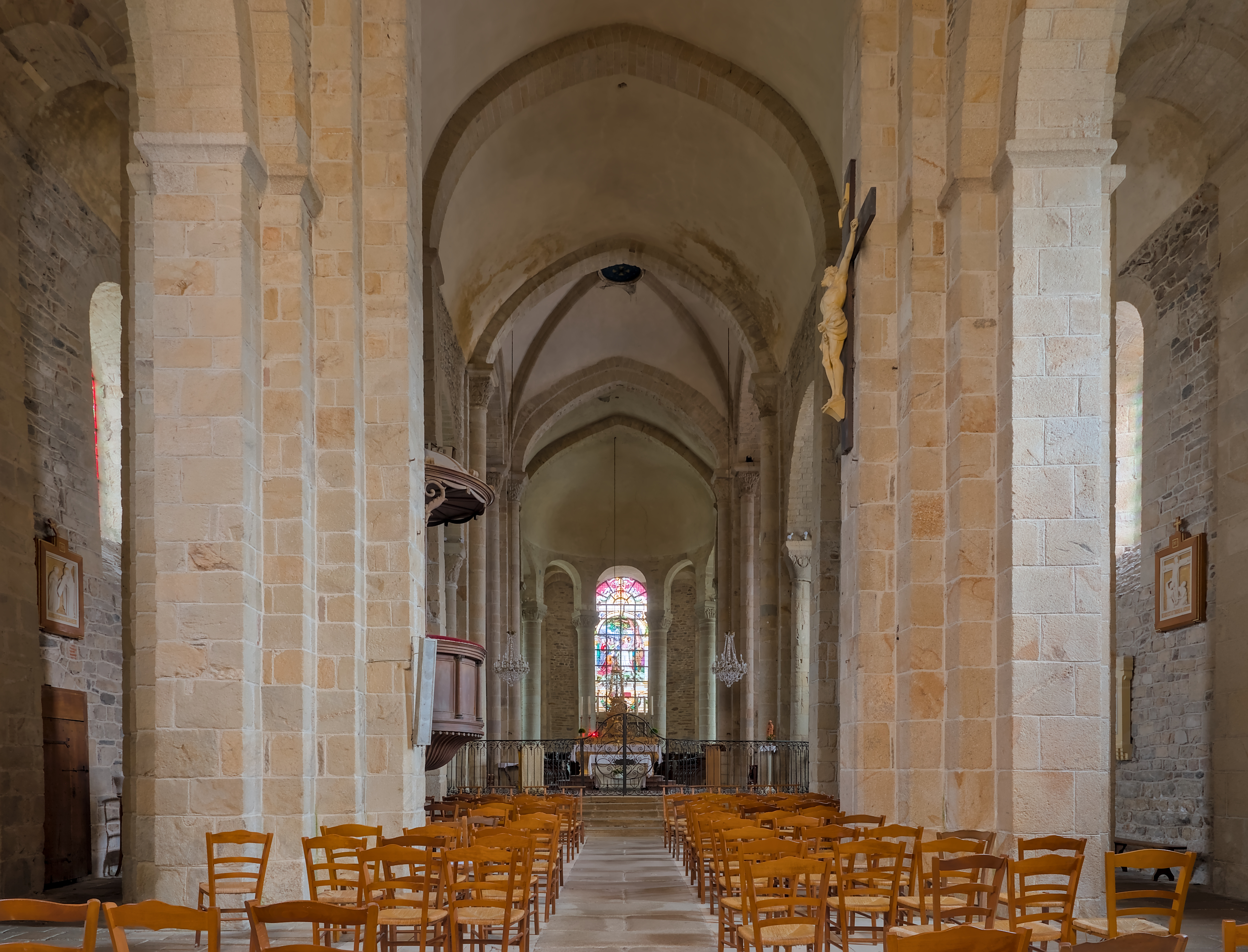
Interior of the abbey church

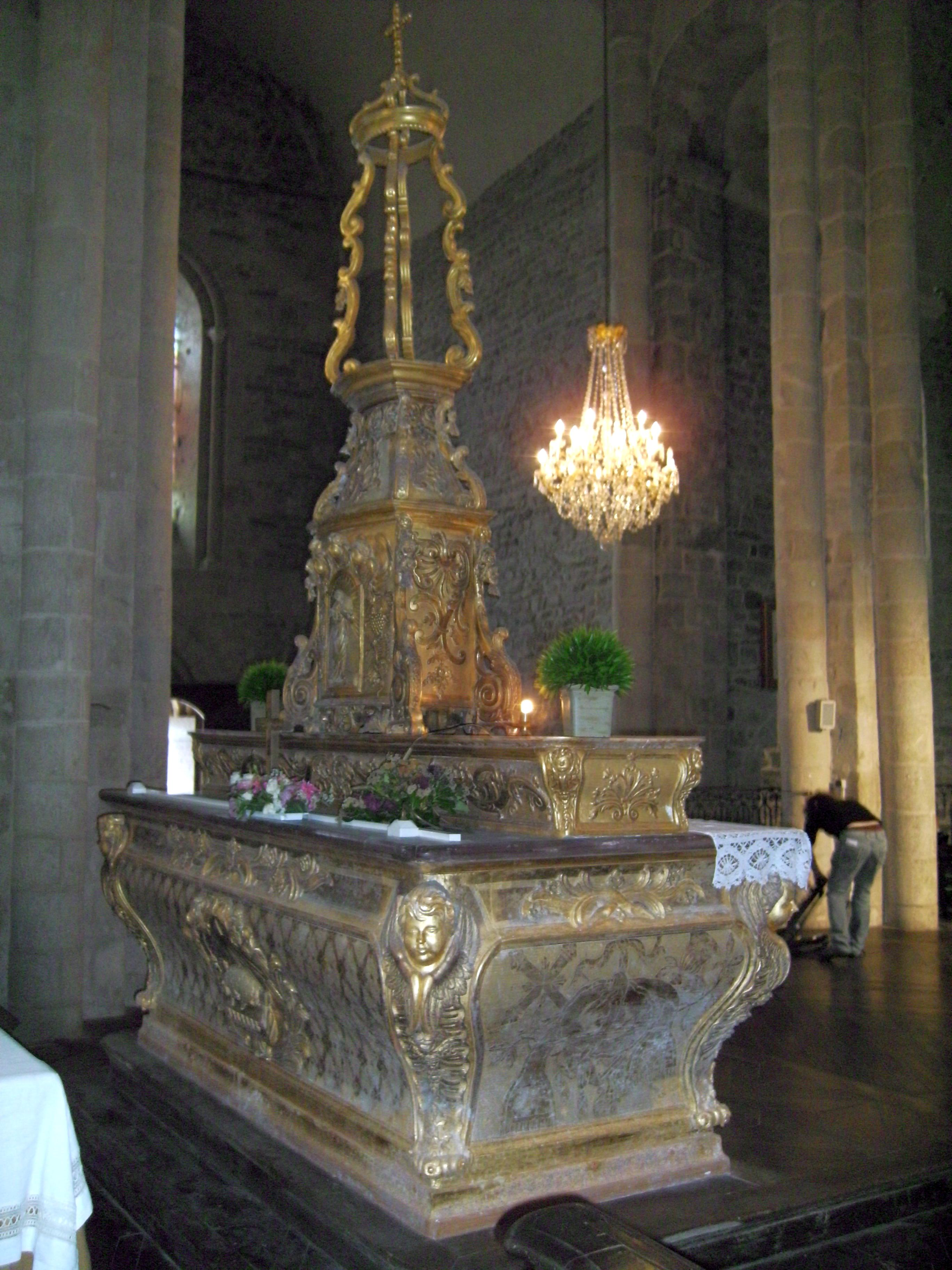
The double-sided altar in the abbey church, 18th century

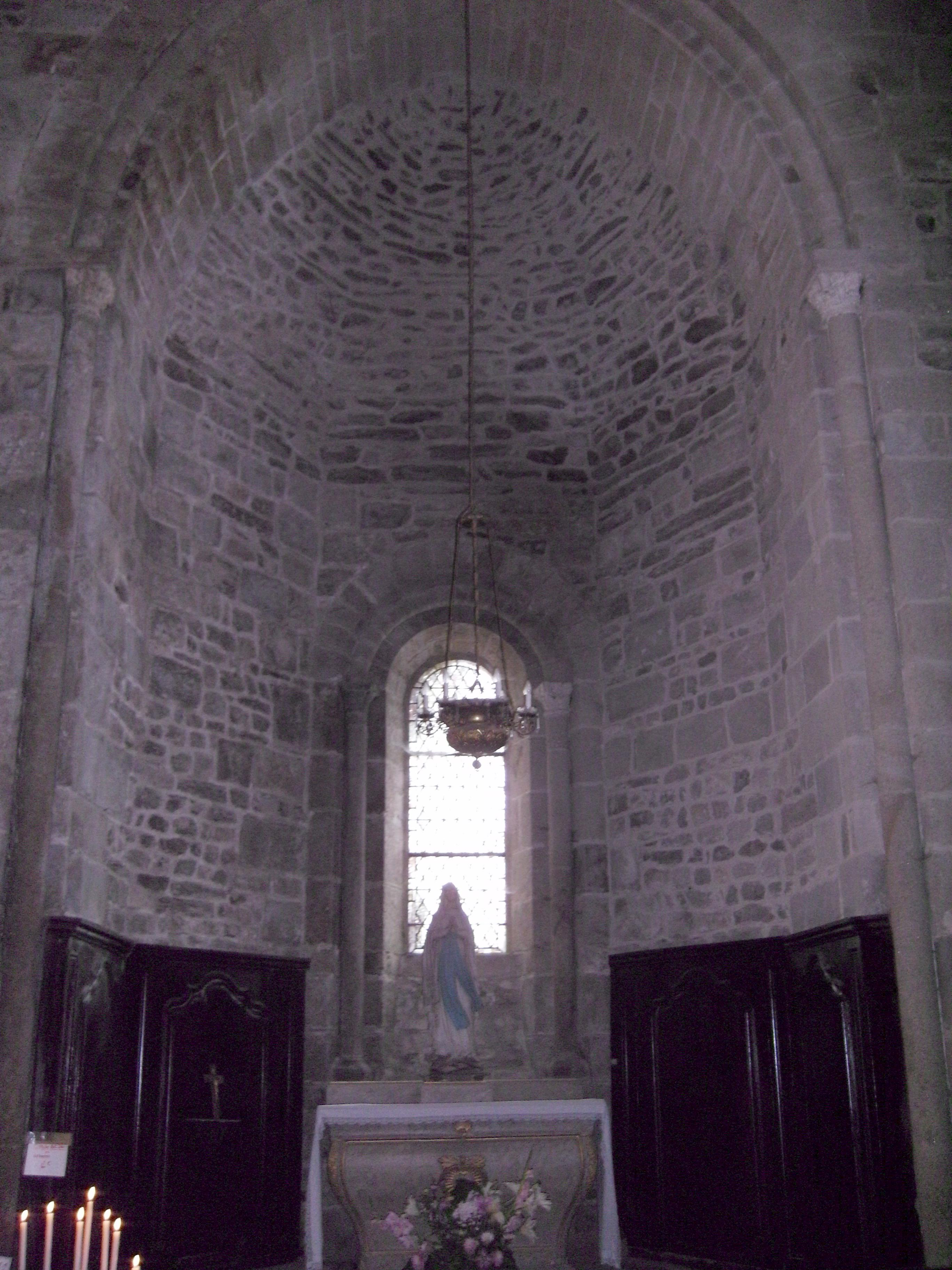
Pentagonal apse, in characteristic Limousin style, abbey church.

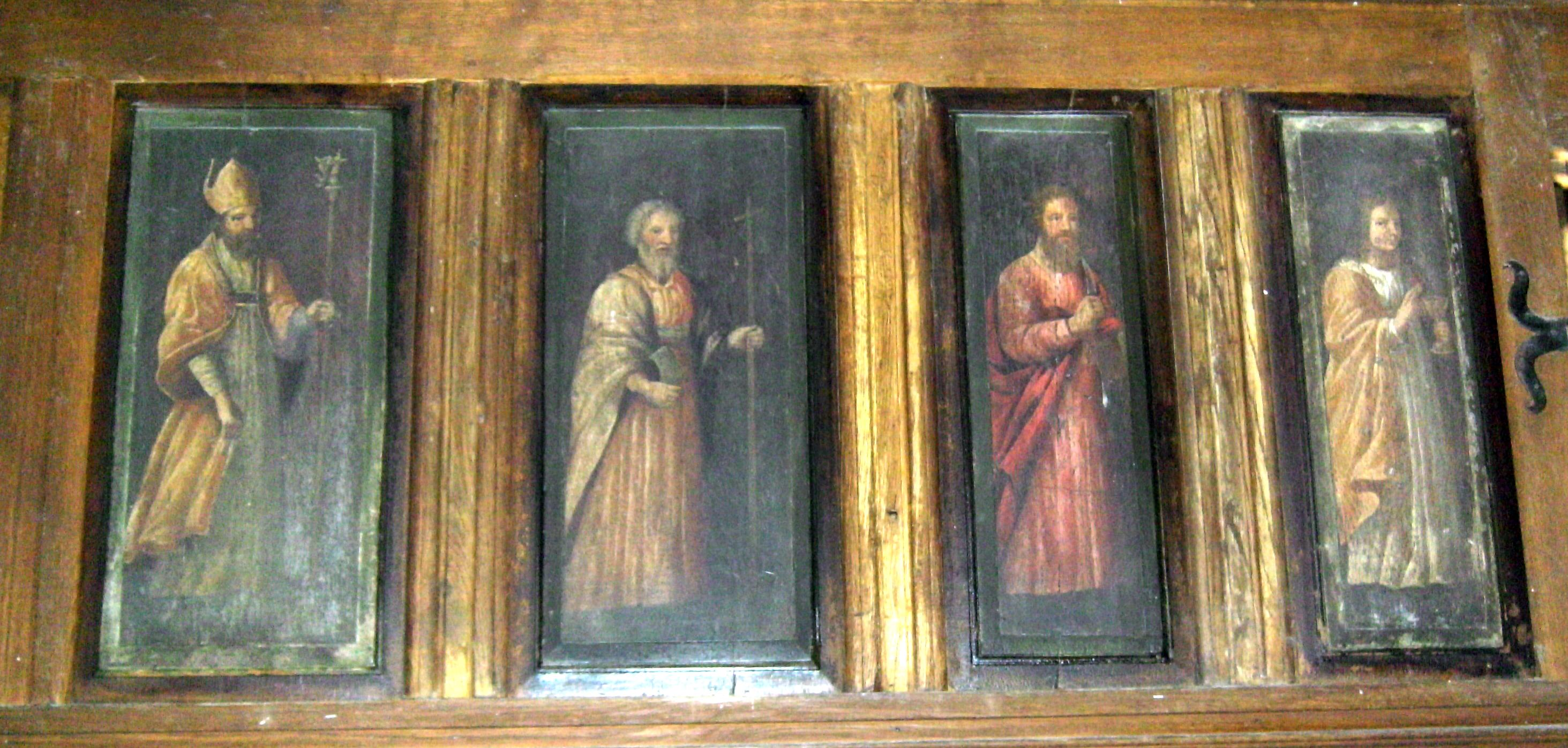
Decorative panel in Uzerche abbey church, depicting bishop (possible Saint Martial) and apostles. 17th century.

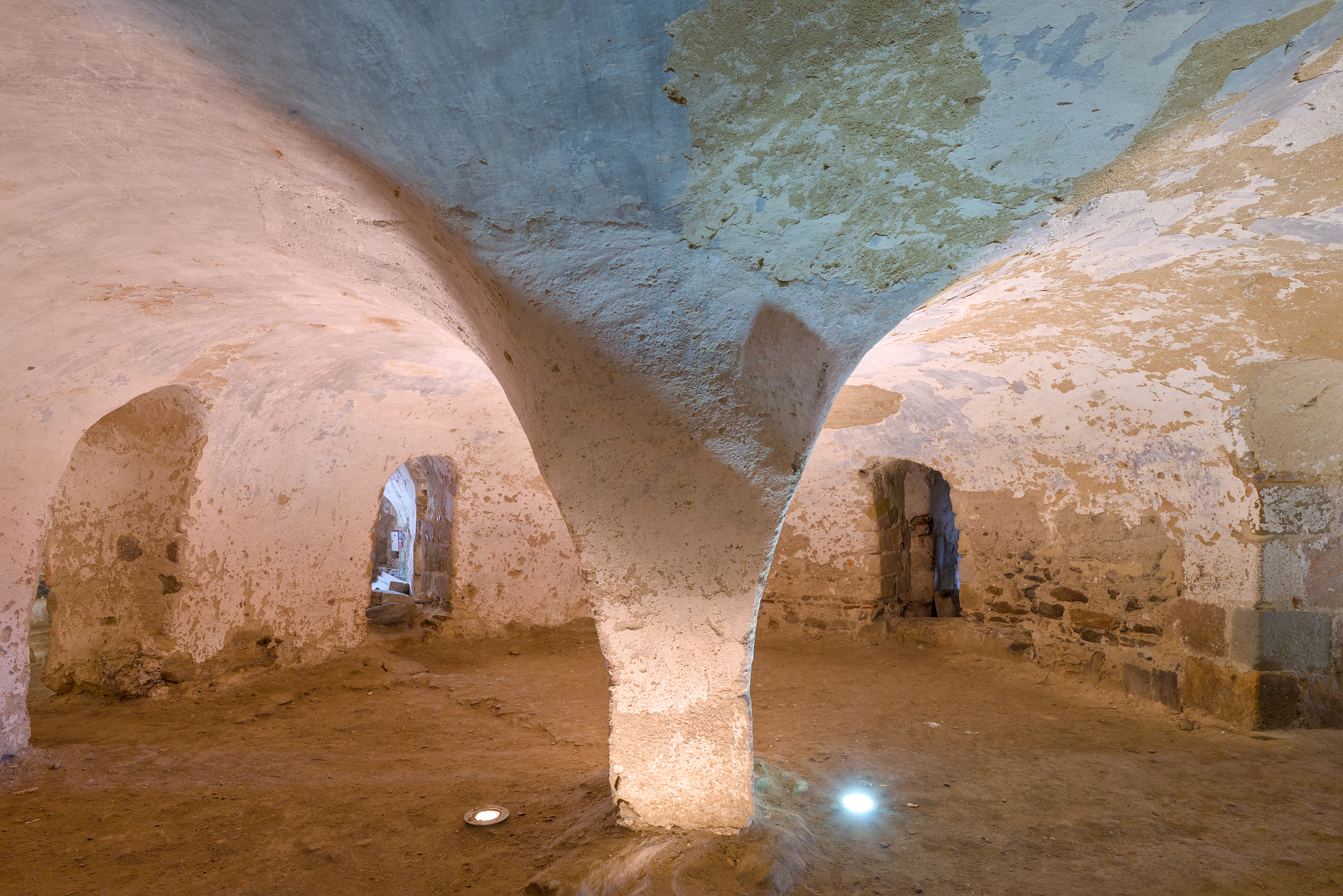
Crypt of the abbey church

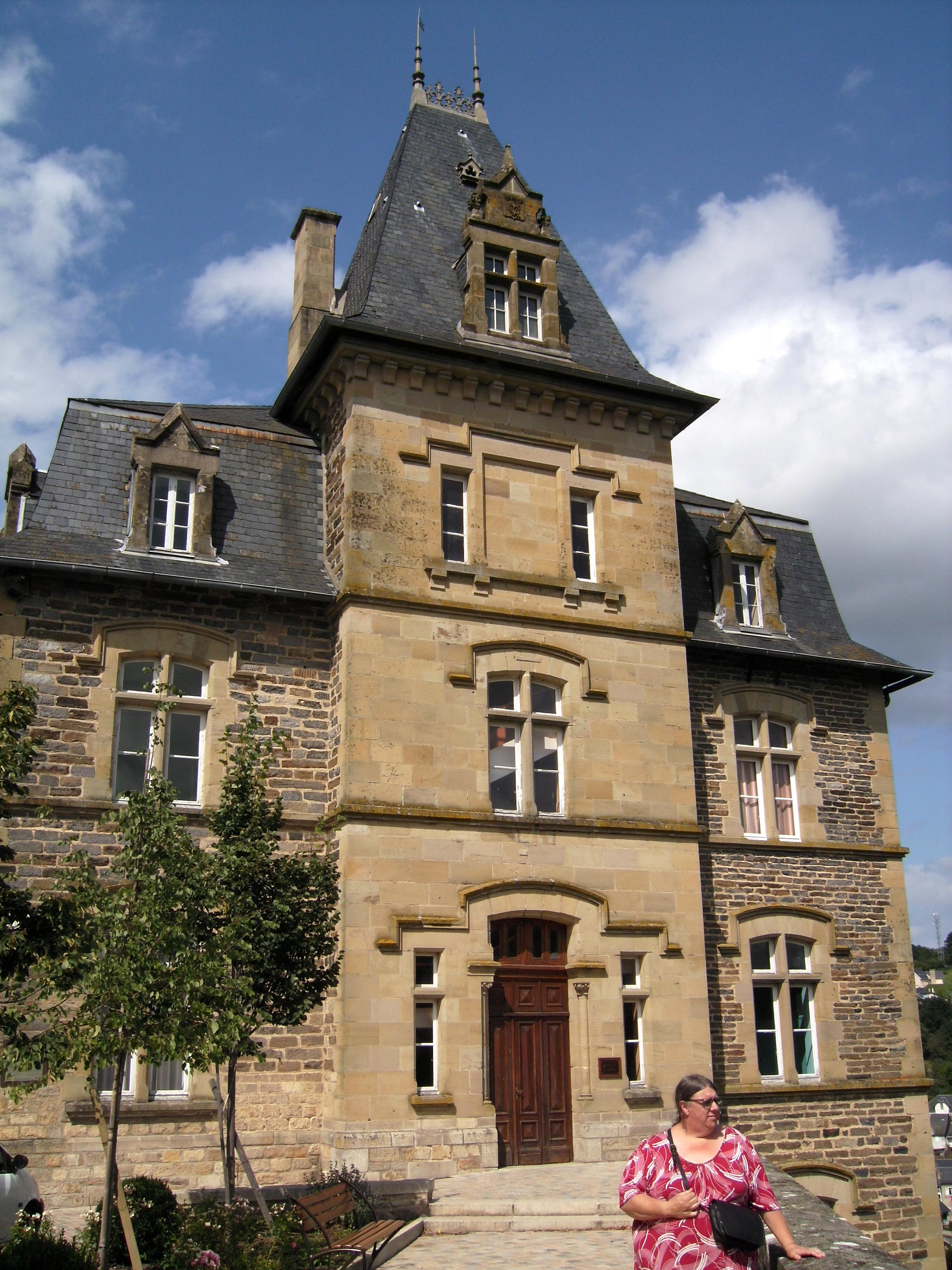
The old lycée or grammar school building, a landmark in secularization when it was built.

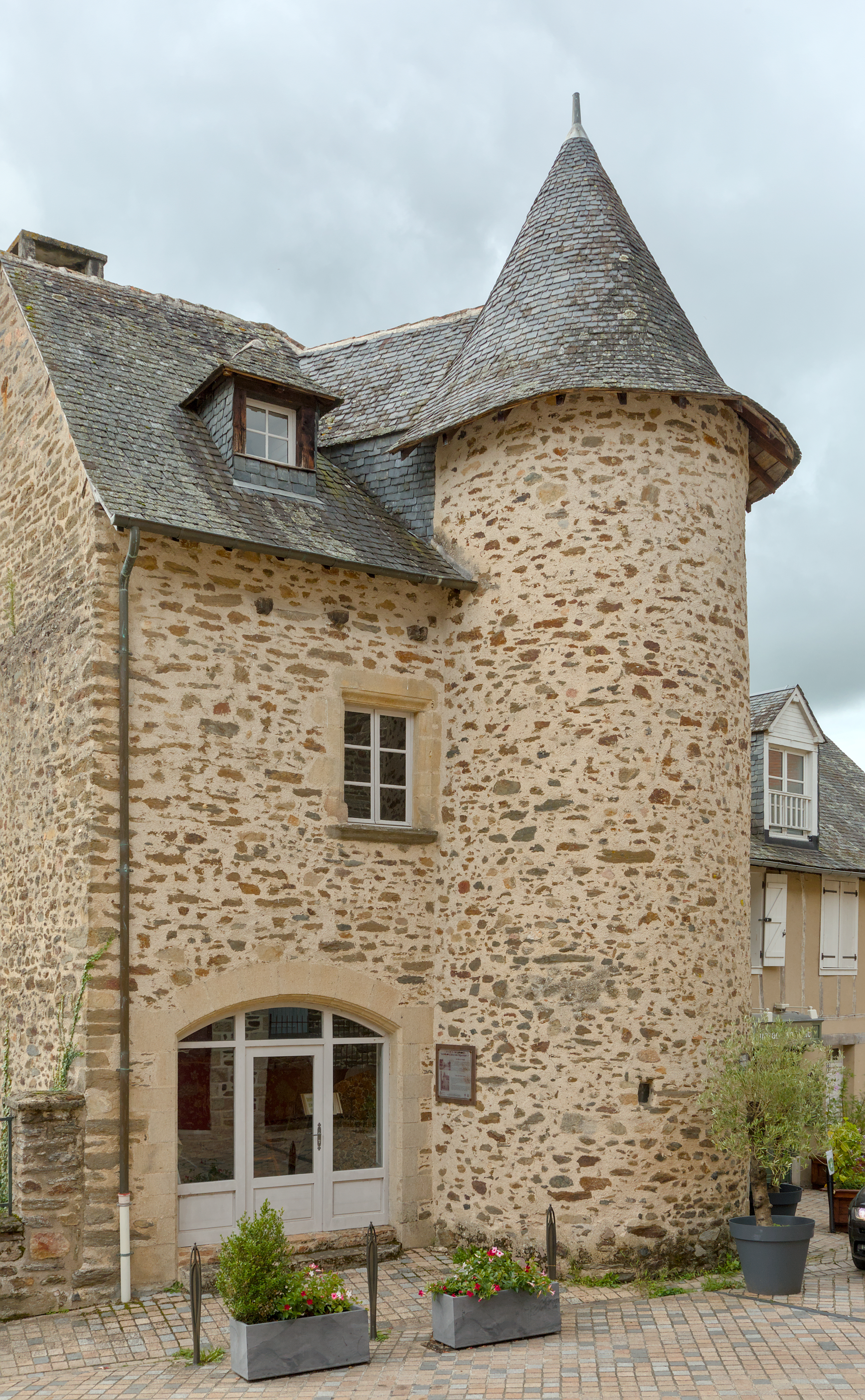
Tour du Prince Noir

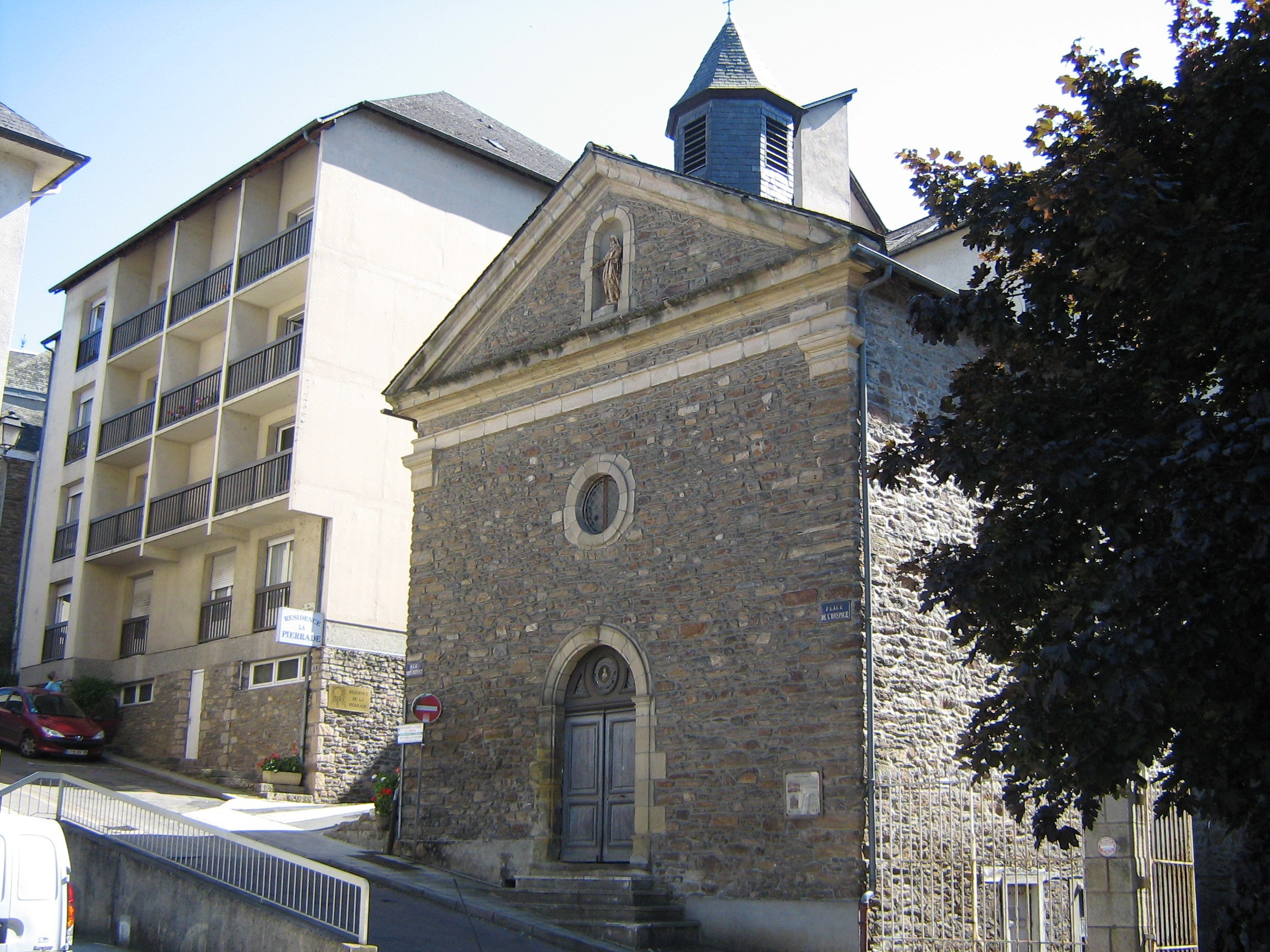
La Chapelle de l'Hospice

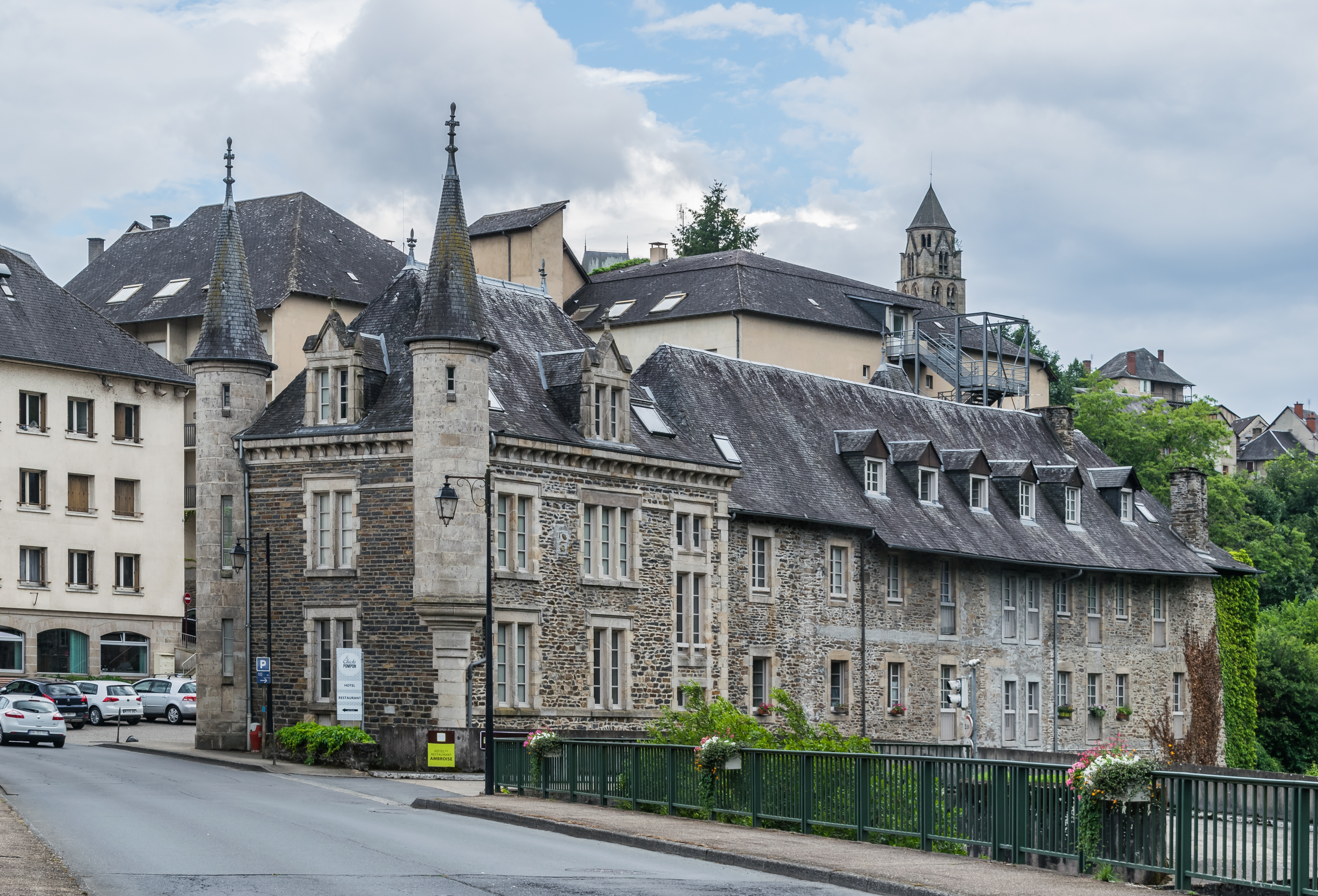
L'Hospice

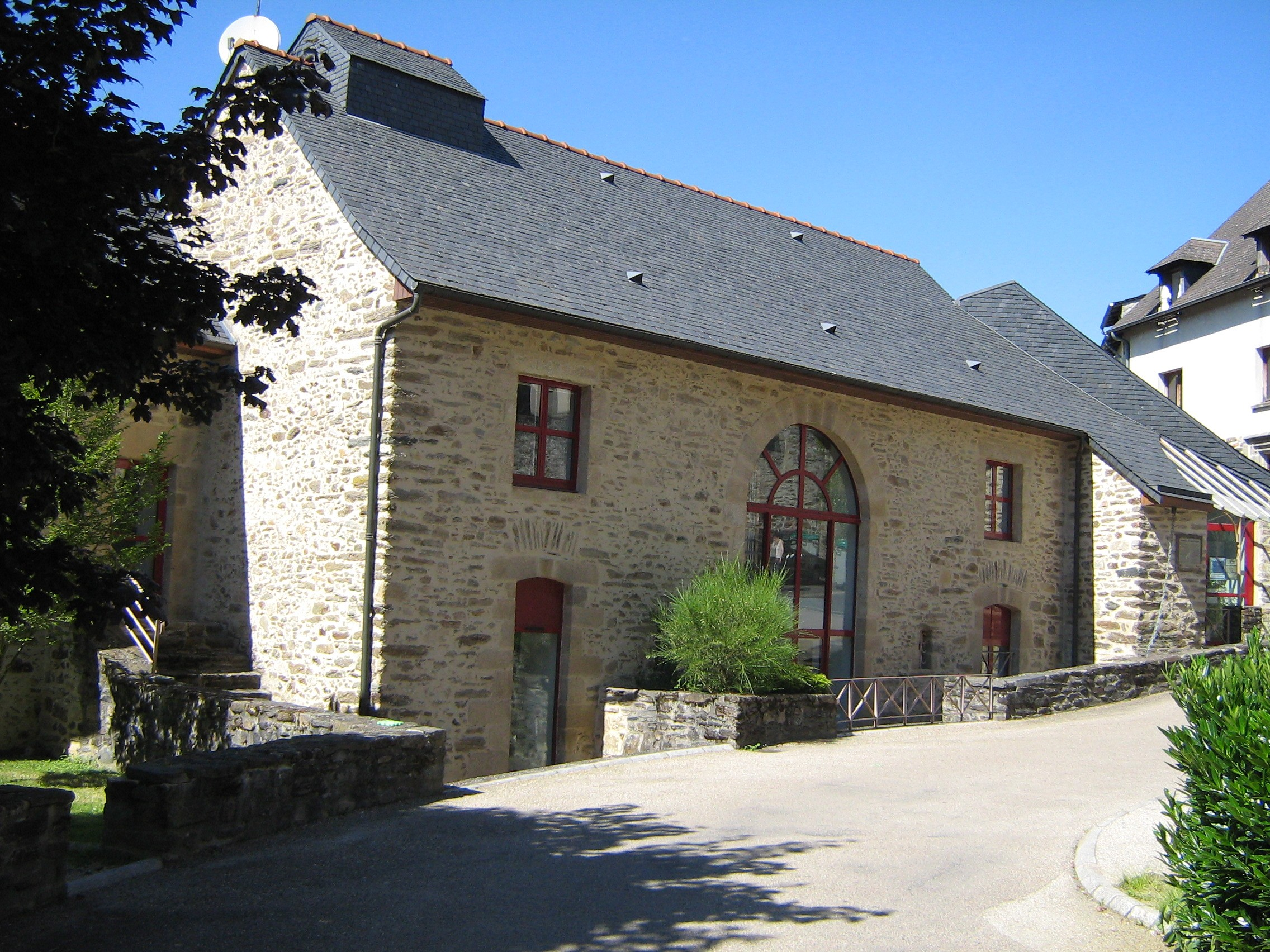
Library

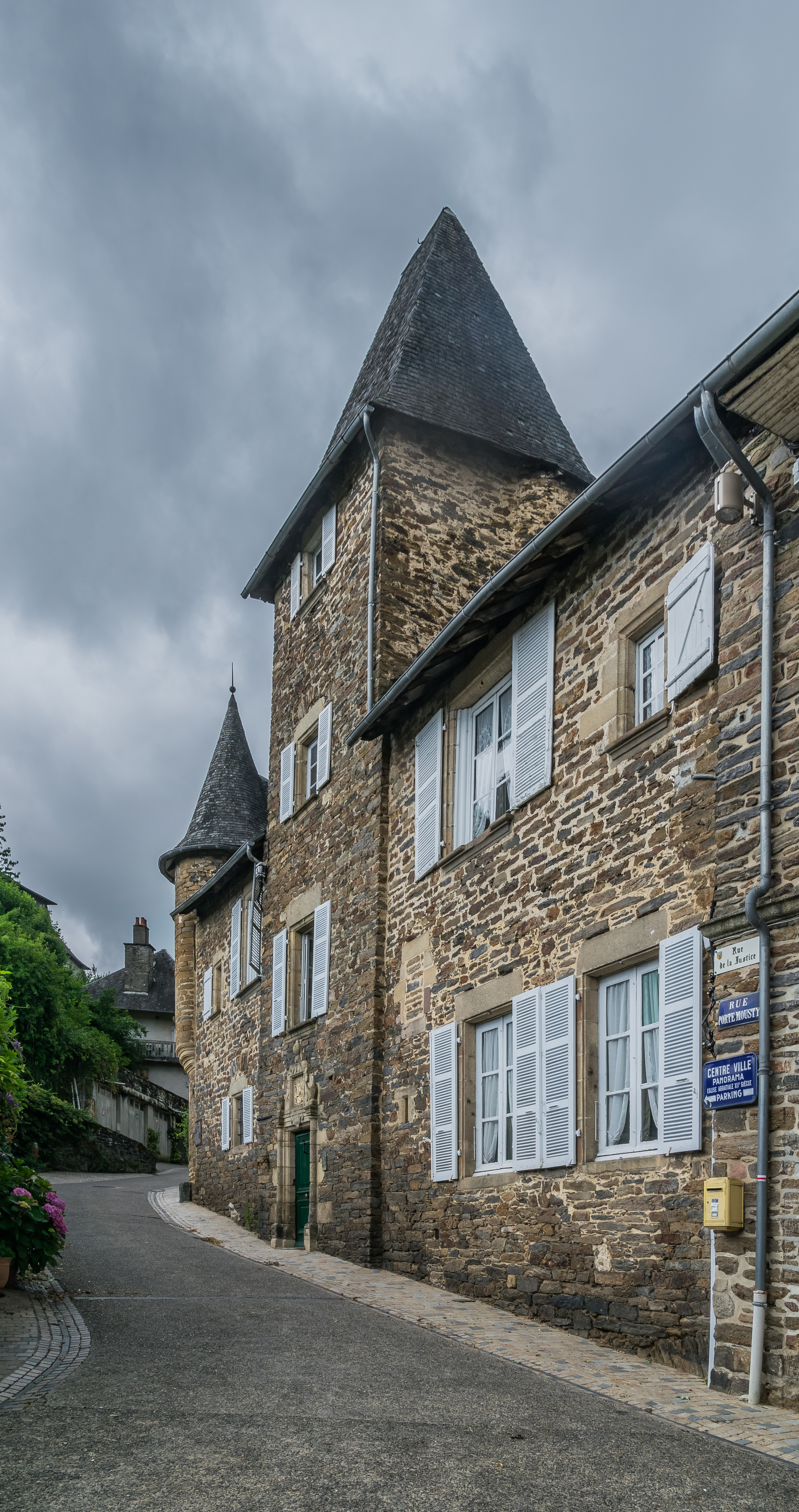
Maison de Tayac

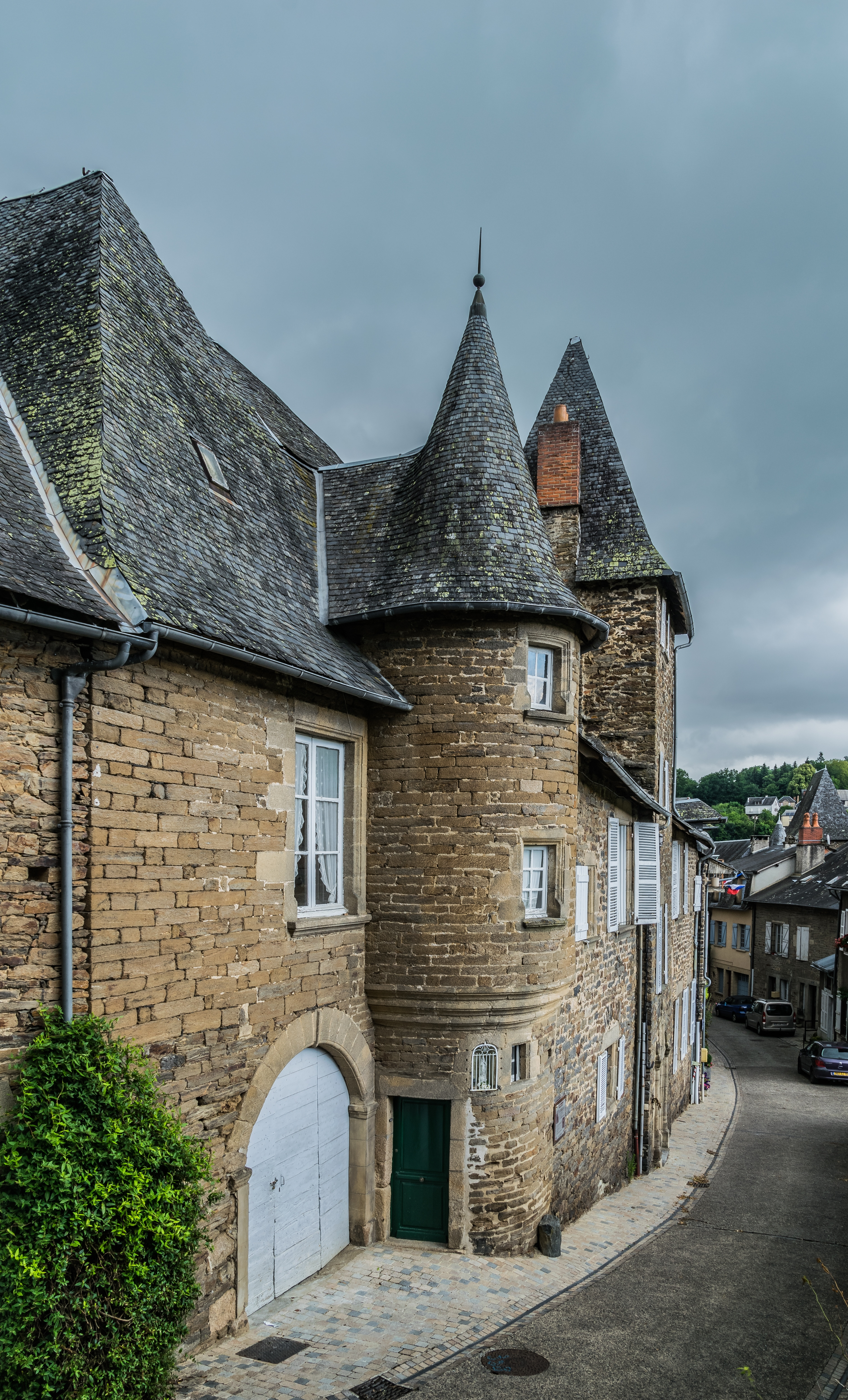
Maison de Tayac

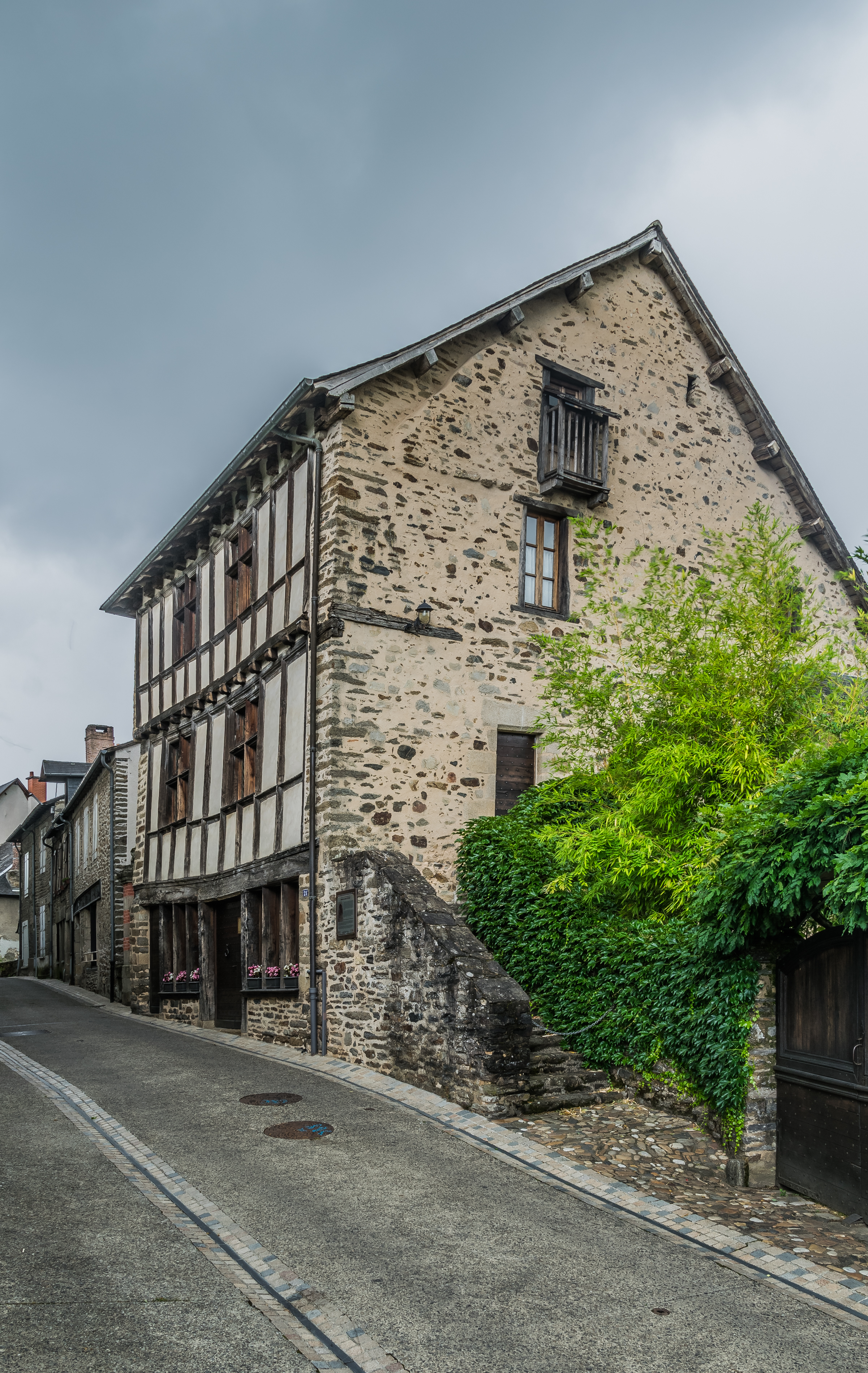
Timber-framed (à pans de bois) house

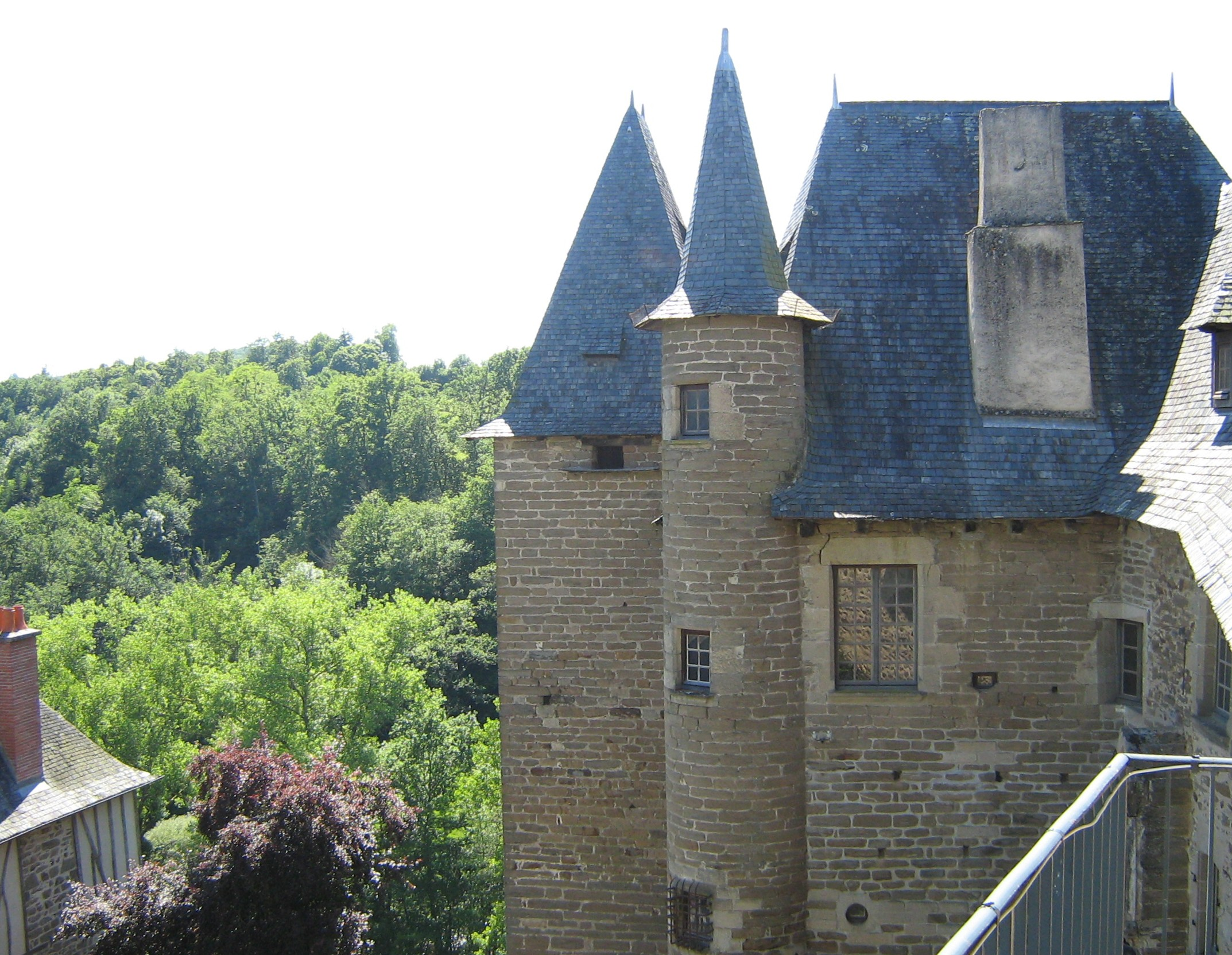
Hôtel Bécharie

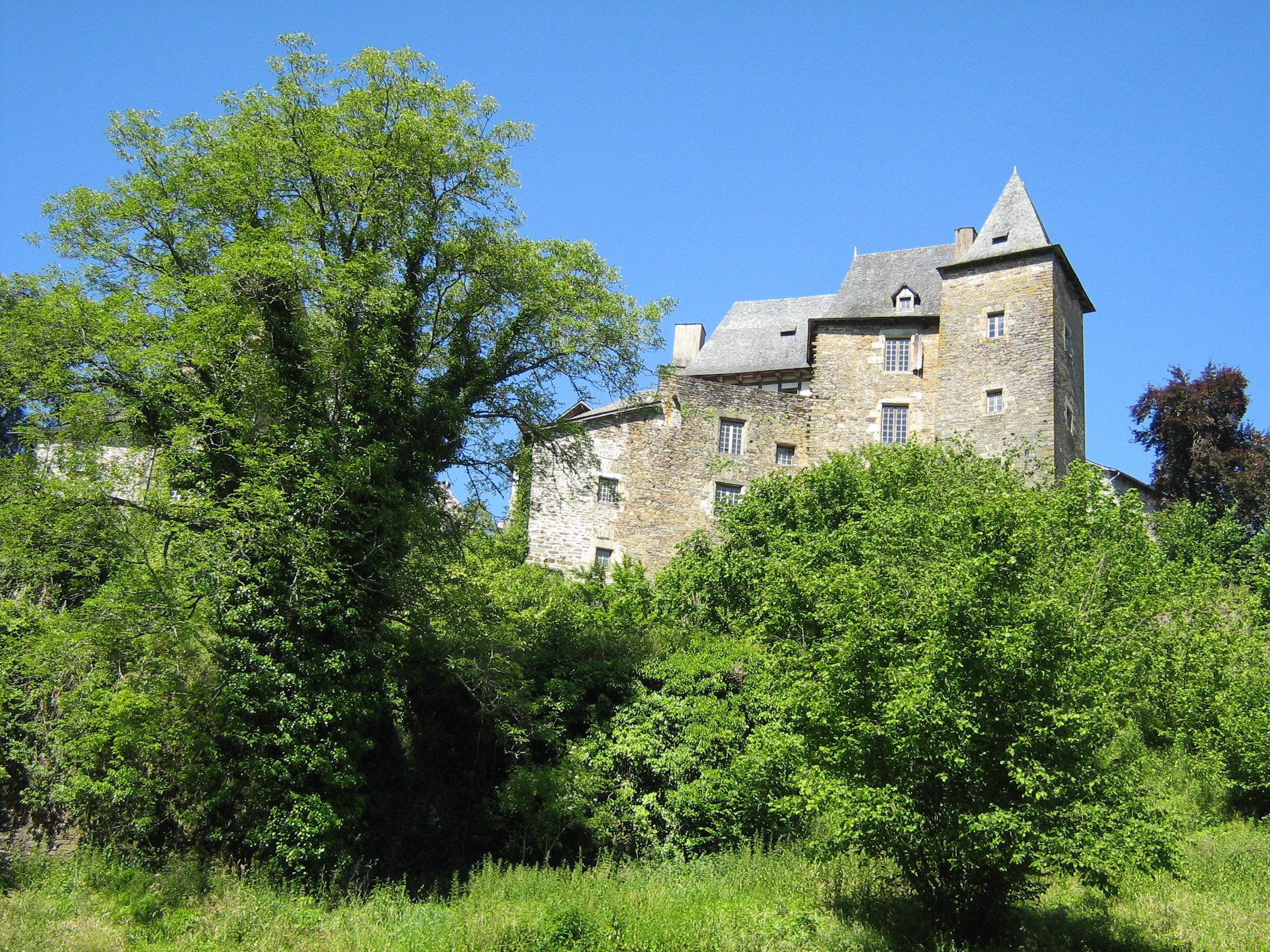
Hôtel Bécharie from the Vézère

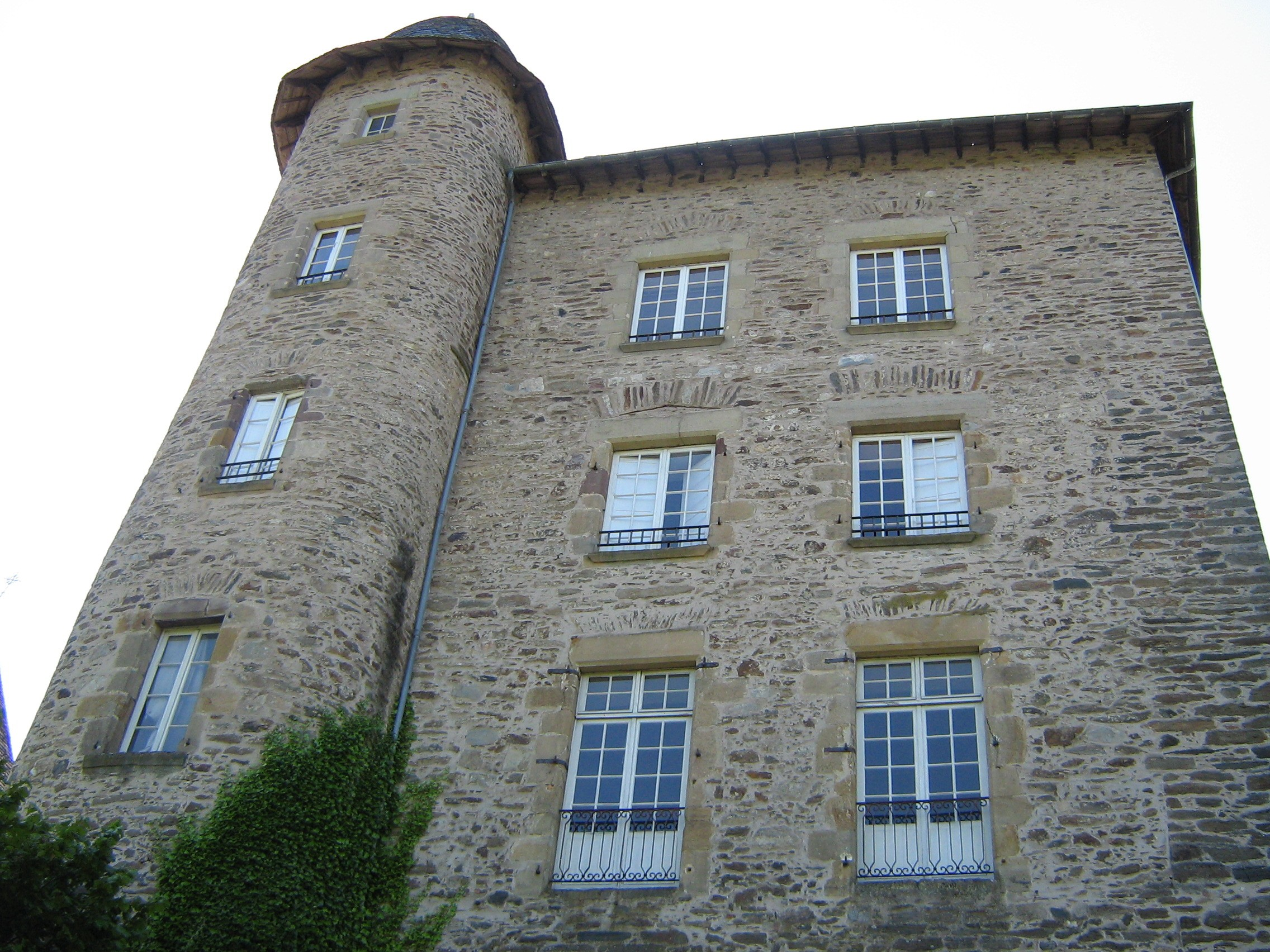
Hôtel des Joyet de Maubec

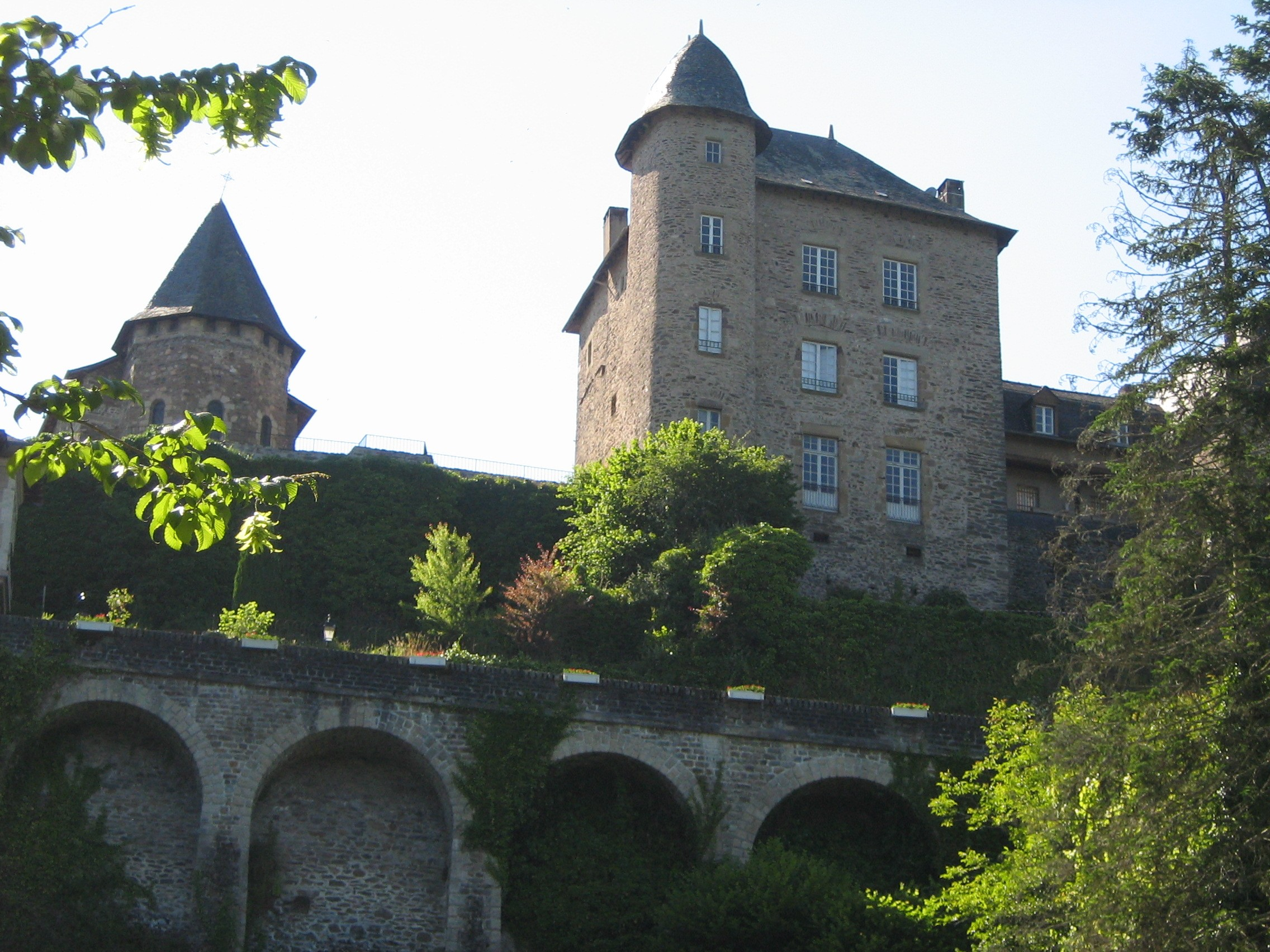
Hôtel des Joyet de Maubec with chapelle (left)

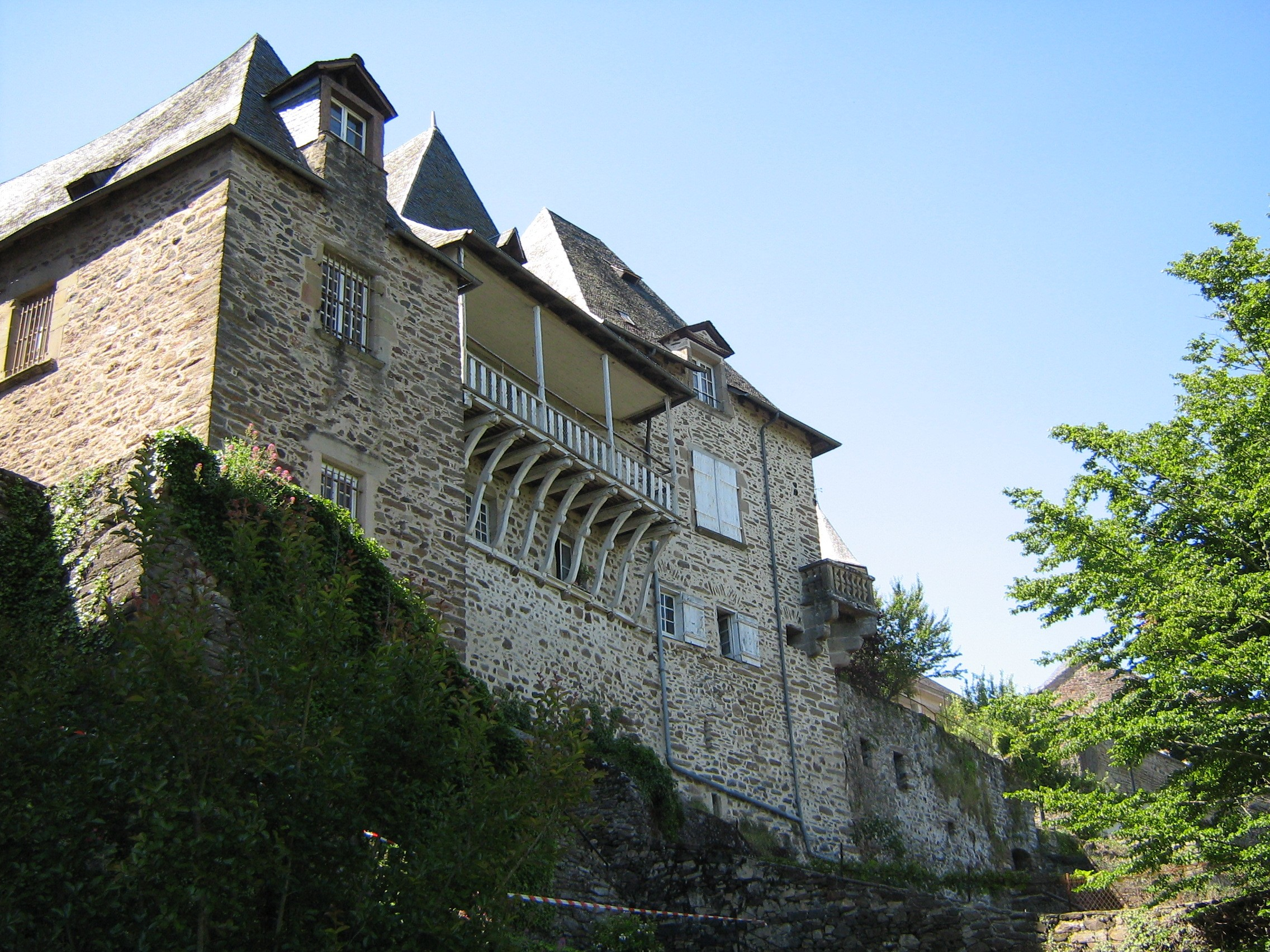
Maison Boyer-Chammard

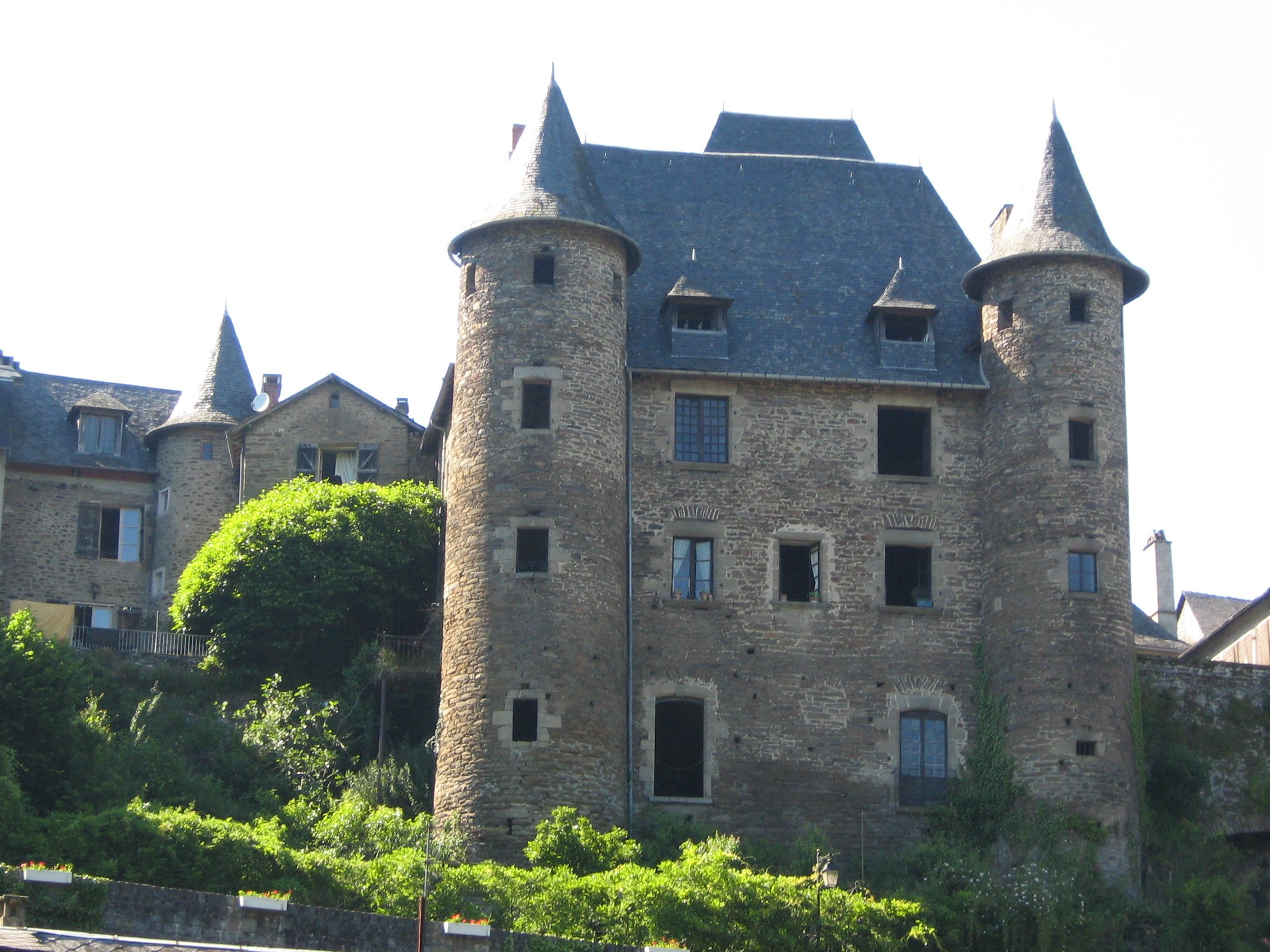
Château Pontier

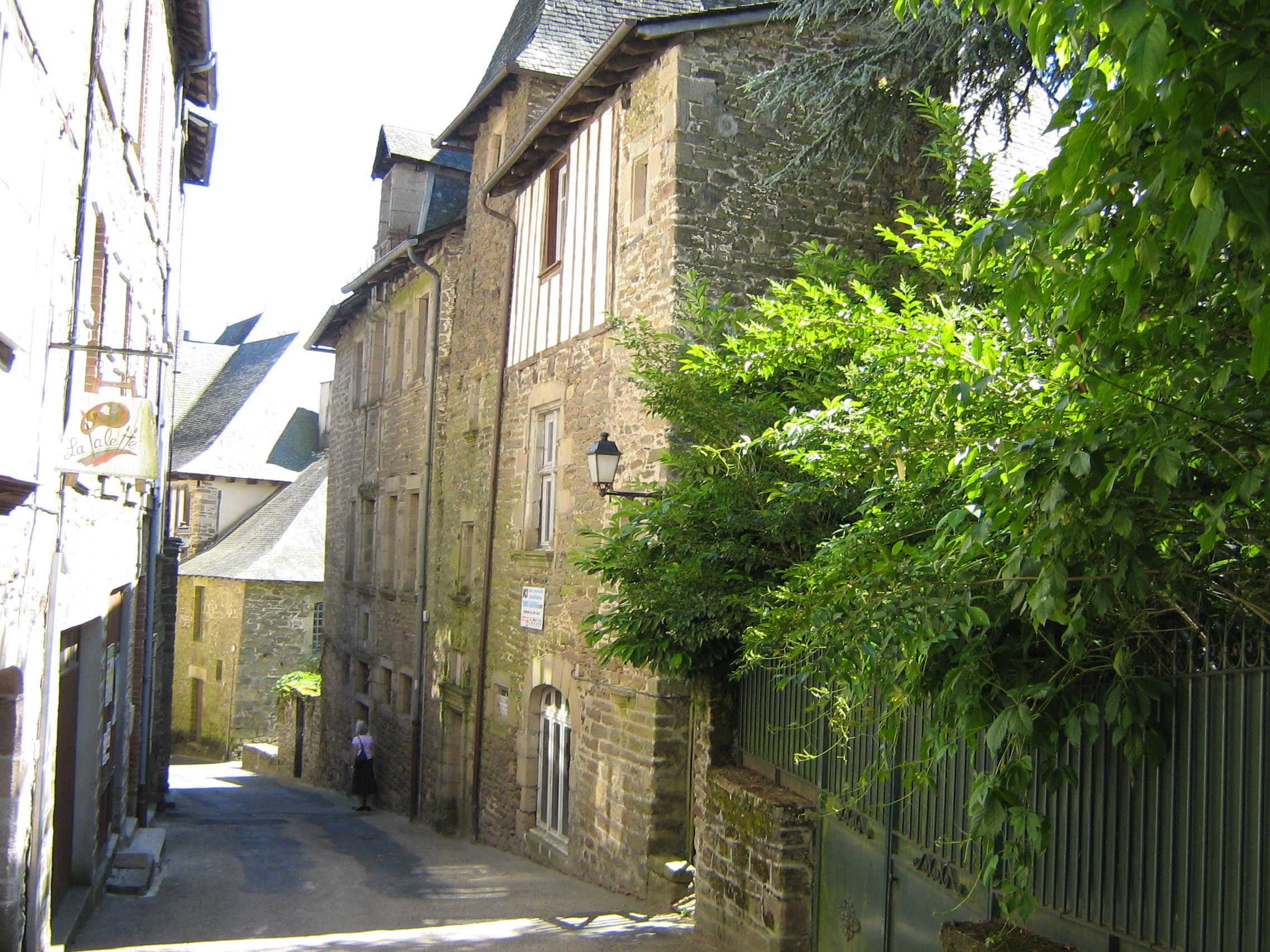
Rue Jean-Gentet
