= Joseph Brugère =

French general (1841–1918)

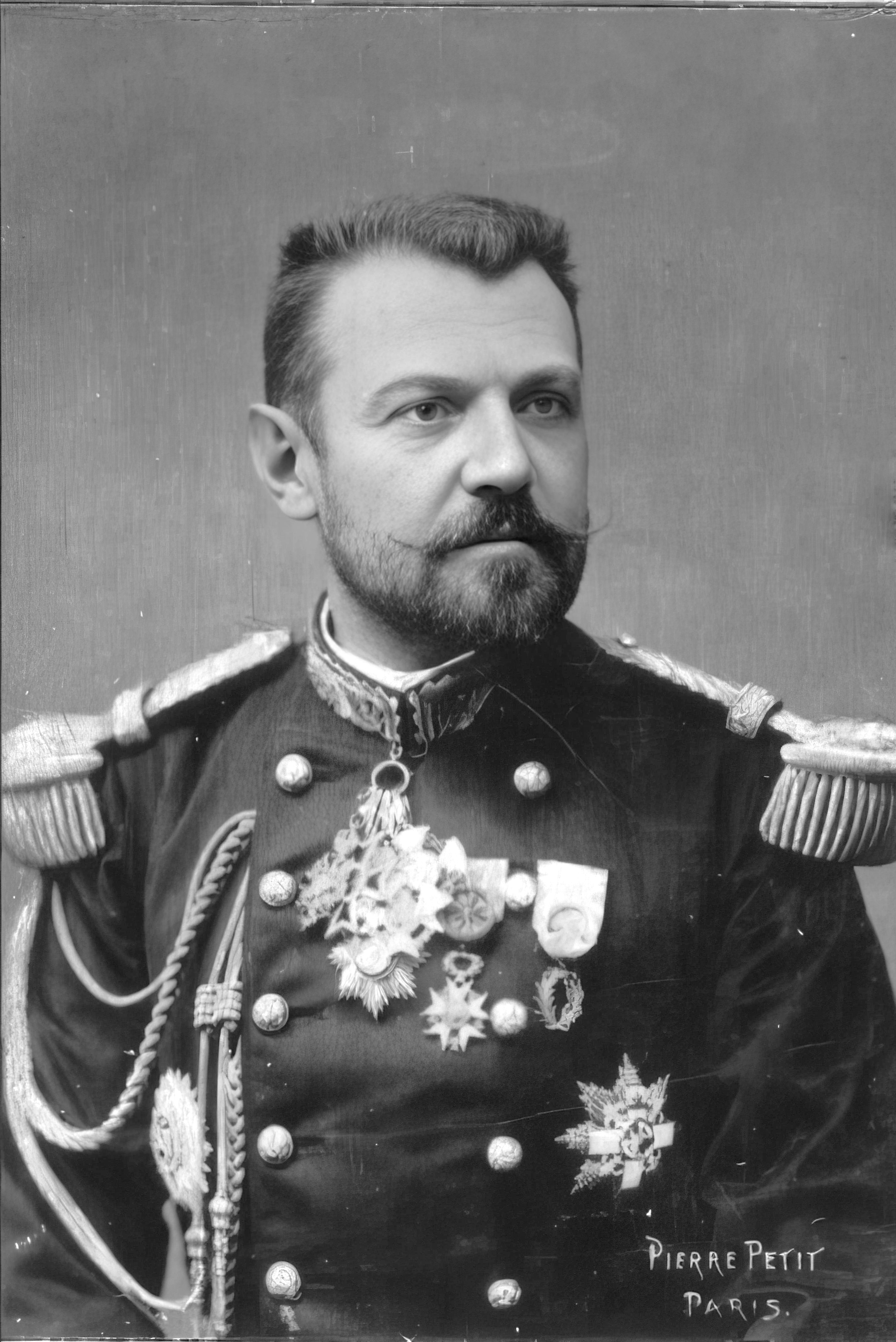
- Brugère in 1899
- Born: 27 June 1841; Uzerche
- Died: 31 August 1918 (aged 77); Lautaret
- Military career
- Allegiance: Second French Empire (1869); French Third Republic
- Branch: French Army
- Service years: 1859–1906; 1914–1918
- Rank: Divisional general
- Commands: 2nd Army Corps
- Conflicts: Franco-Prussian War; World War I
- Awards: Grand cross of the Légion d'honneur

Henri Joseph Brugère (Uzerche, 27 June 1841 – Lautaret, 31 August 1918) was a French divisional general.

== Career ==
On 4 October 1914, German attacks by the II Cavalry Corps (General Georg von der Marwitz) and the XIV Reserve Corps drove the group of the 81st, 82nd, 84th and 88th Territorial divisions (General Joseph Brugère) back from Hébuterne, Gommecourt and Monchy au Bois to the north. The village was captured by the 1st Guard Division on the night of 5/6 October and held against French counter-attacks, which were stopped 50 yards (46 m) short of Gommecourt, where the front settled until March 1917. The French XI Corps attacked at Beaumont Hamel on 19 November but failed to capture the village, after being held up by uncut wire. A diversion was conducted by XI Corps from 7–13 June 1915 at Toutvent Farm, 2 miles (3.2 km) to the north, during the Second Battle of Artois. On a 2,000-yard (1,800 m) stretch of the German front line, an area 1,000 yards (910 m) deep was captured and held against German counter-attacks, at a cost of 10,351 casualties. The area around Gommecourt was taken over by the British in July 1915.
