= Guillaume Grivel =

Guillaume Grivel (16 January 1735 – 17 October 1810) was a French writer, legislator, and educator.

Born into an established family in Uzerche, France, Grivel studied law and landed a spot in the Bordeaux Parliament by 1758. A man of letters, he began penning essays on the topic of education and in 1775 had the privilege to present his Théorie de l'éducation to the King. Continuing to write, he published six editions of his L'Isle inconnue (1783–1787), and contributed to the Dictionnaire d'économie politique de l'Encyclopédie méthodique. He was elected as a member of the American Philosophical Society in 1786.

Working as a judge and commissioner for Uzerche, Grivel addressed the sociopolitical climate of 1790 by publishing his Principes de politique, de finance, d'agriculture, de législation, an ambitious project which sought to compile all philosophy relevant to organized civilization. An ambitious project that inevitably contributed to his election to various learned societies—of which there were many that could boast his name: he belonged to the academies of Dijon, La Rochelle, Rouen, the Société des sciences, belles-lettres et arts de Paris, and the Société galvanique. In 1796, he won an appointment as professeur de législation aux écoles centrales du département de la Seine. After the abolition of those schools, however, he struggled to find work due to his advanced age.
