= Plateau de Millevaches =

Upland area in Limousin, France

Coordinates: 45°40′N 01°55′E

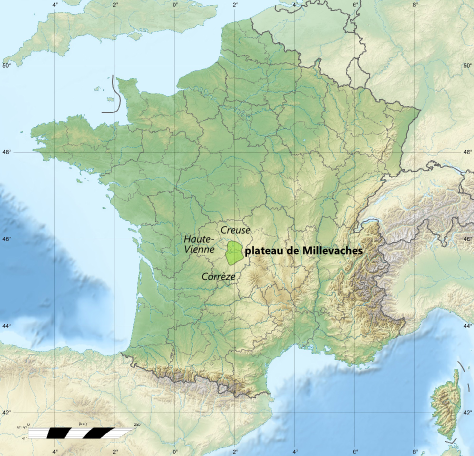
Location of the Plateau de Millevaches in France

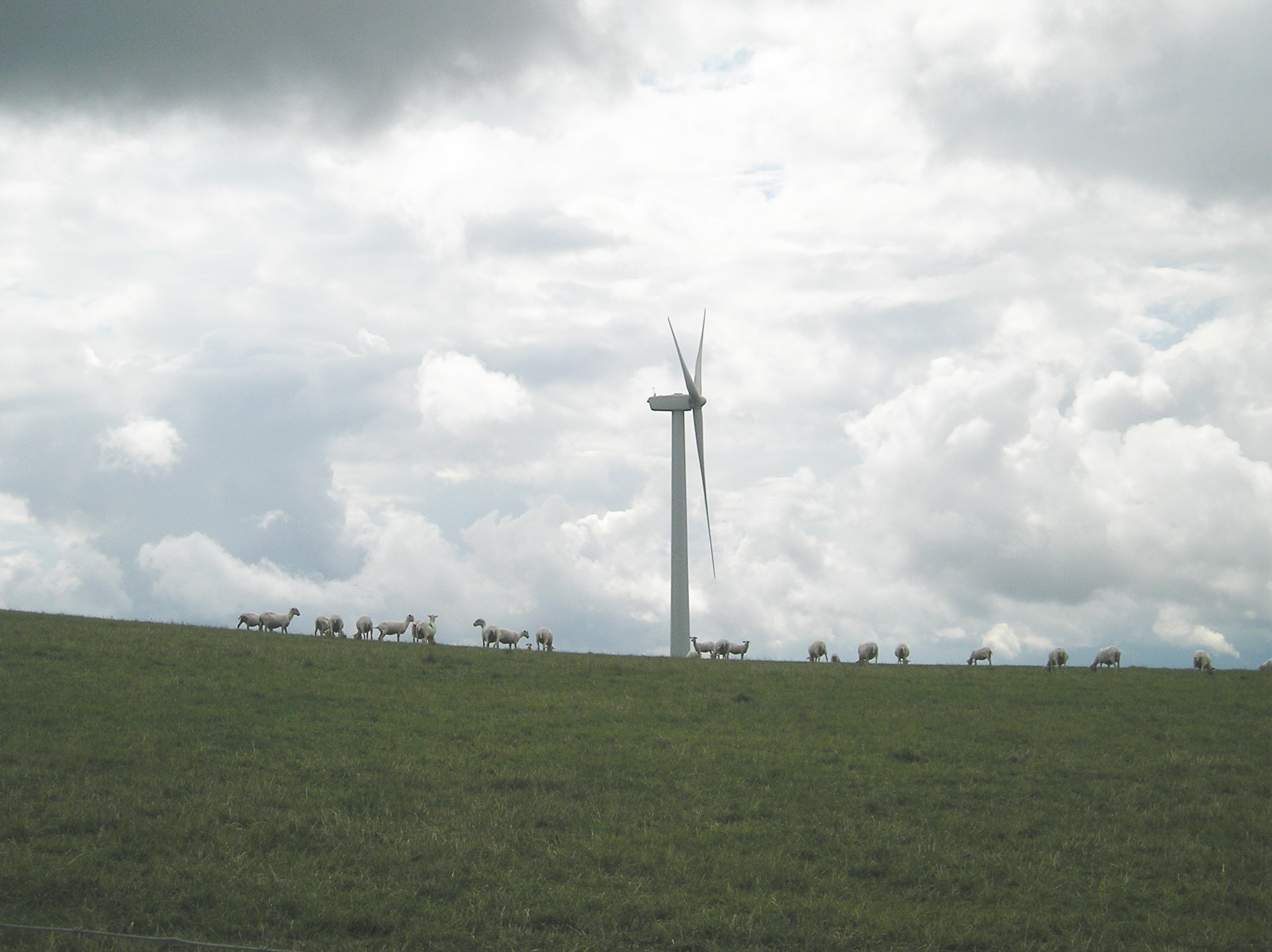
Plateau de Millevaches

The Plateau de Millevaches (French pronunciation: [plato də milvaʃ]; Occitan: Replanat de Miuvachas) is an upland area in Limousin, a former administrative region of France. It covers approximately 3,500 km^{2} and crosses the boundaries of three French departments: Corrèze, Creuse, and Haute-Vienne.

The majority of the area is between 600 and 1,000 metres (2,000 and 3,300 ft) above sea level.

== Structure and geology ==
Although commonly referred to as a plateau, the Millevaches Massif is actually more like a shallow dome, deeply dissected by streams and rivers, and slightly tilted, with the south-eastern edge elevated and more exposed. This is the visible remnant of a laccolith, a large lens-shaped mass of granite, believed to be the result of an intrusion of igneous material in the late Hercynian or Variscan orogeny. As the surrounding, softer material has weathered away, the laccolith has become increasingly exposed.

Although not strictly a plateau, depending upon which direction one approaches the area from, the Plateau de Millevaches forms an important kind of step up (or a step down) in the Massif Central. There are a number of definite peaks, the highest being Mont Bessou (976m.), at the southern edge of the massif, near Meymac.

== Character and features ==
The massif is generally densely wooded, with large areas of both coniferous forest and mixed woodland. Among the broadleaf trees, birch and beech predominate, and many roads are lined with beeches. The highest part of the massif, bounded roughly by the villages of Rempnat, Peyrelevade, Millevaches and Saint-Merd-les-Oussines, is the most densely wooded, with little agriculture or even stock-rearing intruding among the forests. Elsewhere, there is a patchwork of woods and meadows, with herds of Limousin cattle dotting the landscape, and a few fields of maize or rye.

There is a distinctive type of bog or marsh (tourbières in French) which gives rise to numerous rivers such as the Vienne. Many of these rivers are often filled with wild brown trout. The area around the village of Millevaches and the Signale d'Audouze (an outstanding peak) is part of an important watershed. The Vienne, which has its sources here, flows mainly northward, across central France, to feed the Loire. The Vézère, which arises next to it, drains south into the Dordogne, sending its water to the Atlantic via the Gironde estuary.

Many of the rivers have been dammed to create large lakes. The largest of all is the Lac de Vassivière, the result of damming the Maulde. The nearby Lac de la Vaud-Gelade is fed by the Taurion. The Vézère feeds two large lakes at Viam and Treignac. All of these provide both drinking water and hydroelectricity. They are also home to major leisure attractions, being lined with beaches, sailing schools, marinas, camp sites and picnic areas.

There are very few towns or villages of any size on the Plateau de Millevaches, but the towns of Meymac, Felletin, Ussel and Eymoutiers are situated at the edges of the Plateau.

== Gallery ==
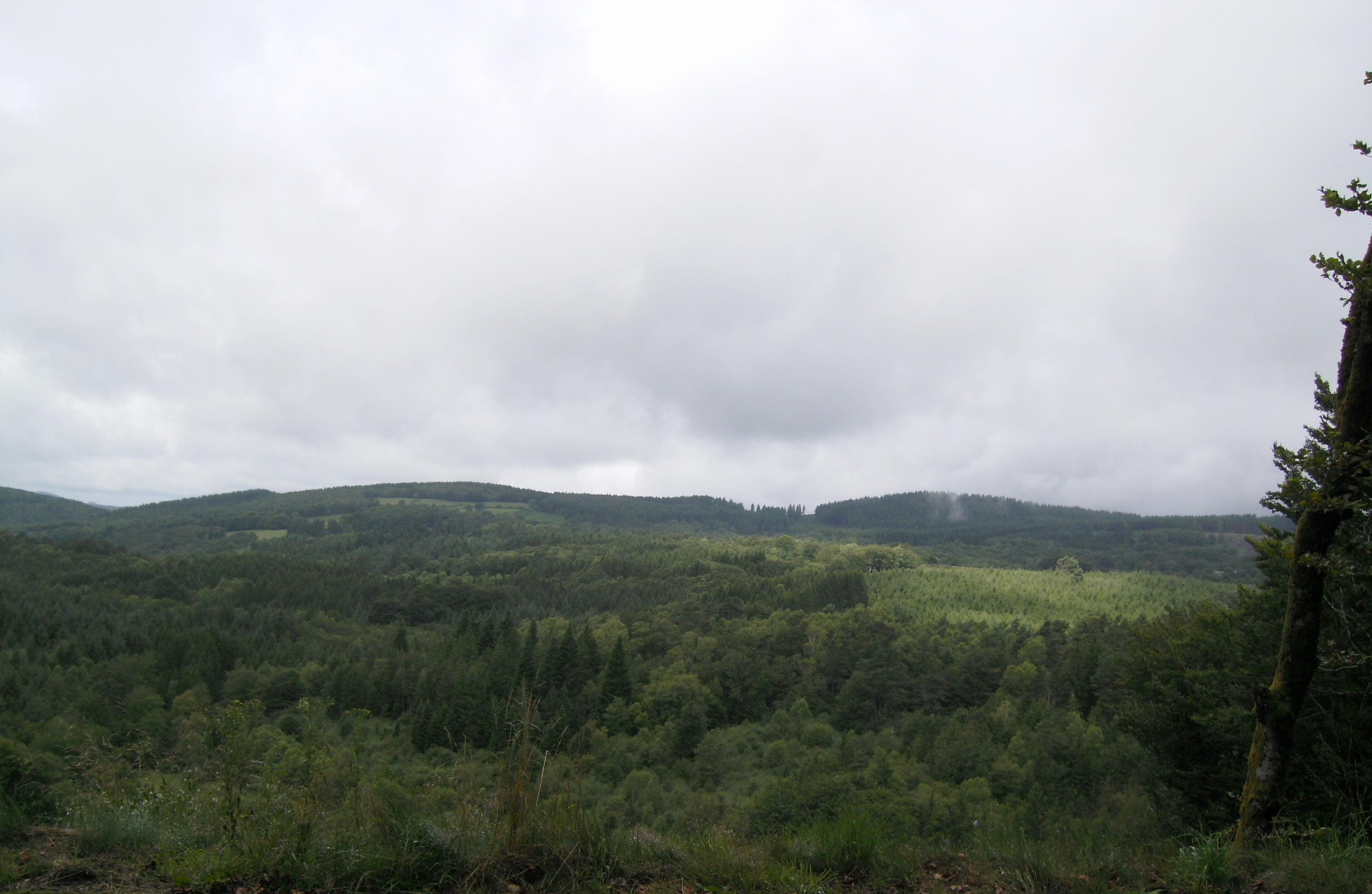
Typical wooded landscape of the Millevache Plateau, between Peyrelevade and Tarnac

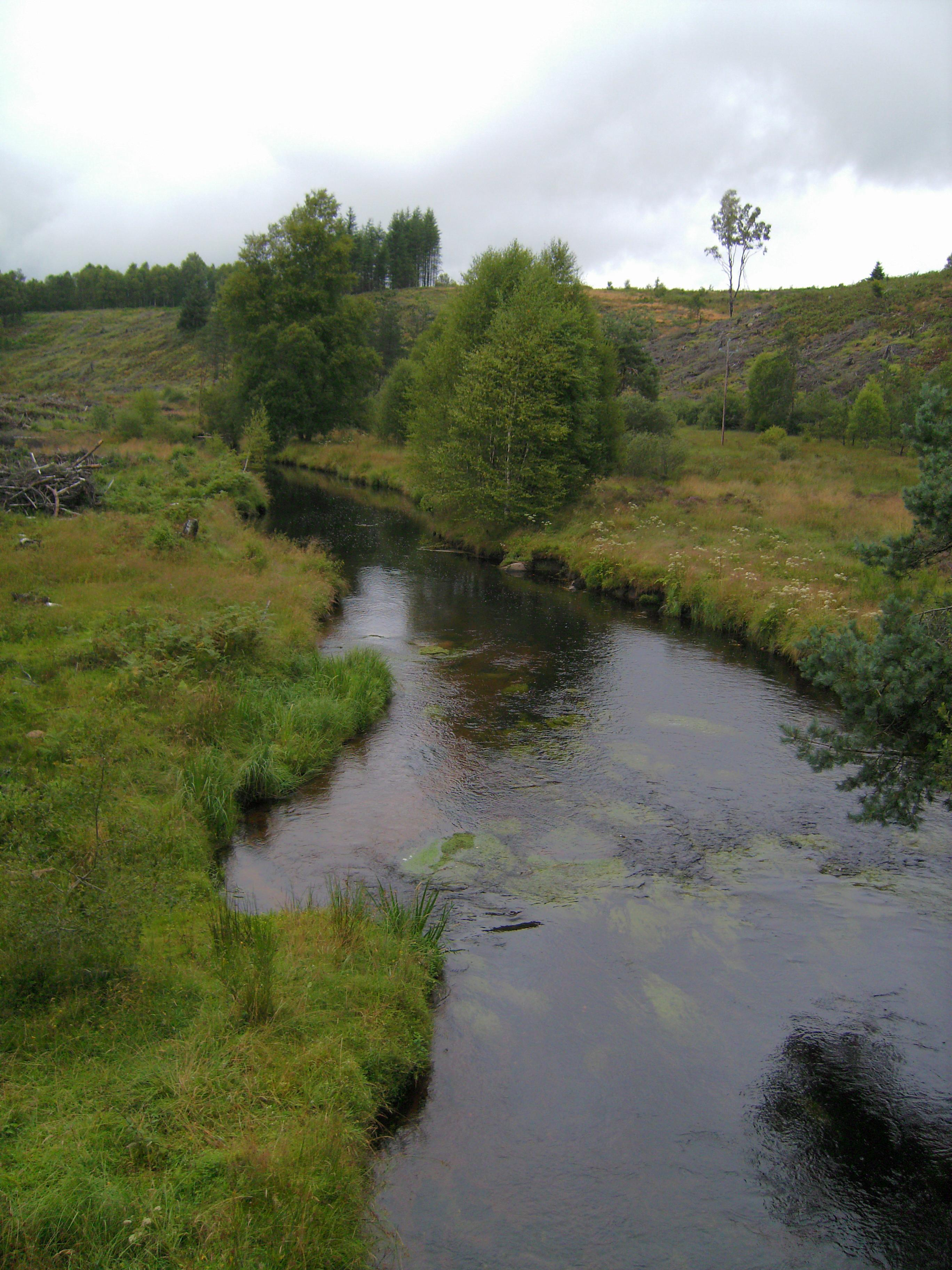
The River Vienne, flowing past signs of recent logging near Peyrelevade, a few kilometres from its sources near the village of Millevaches

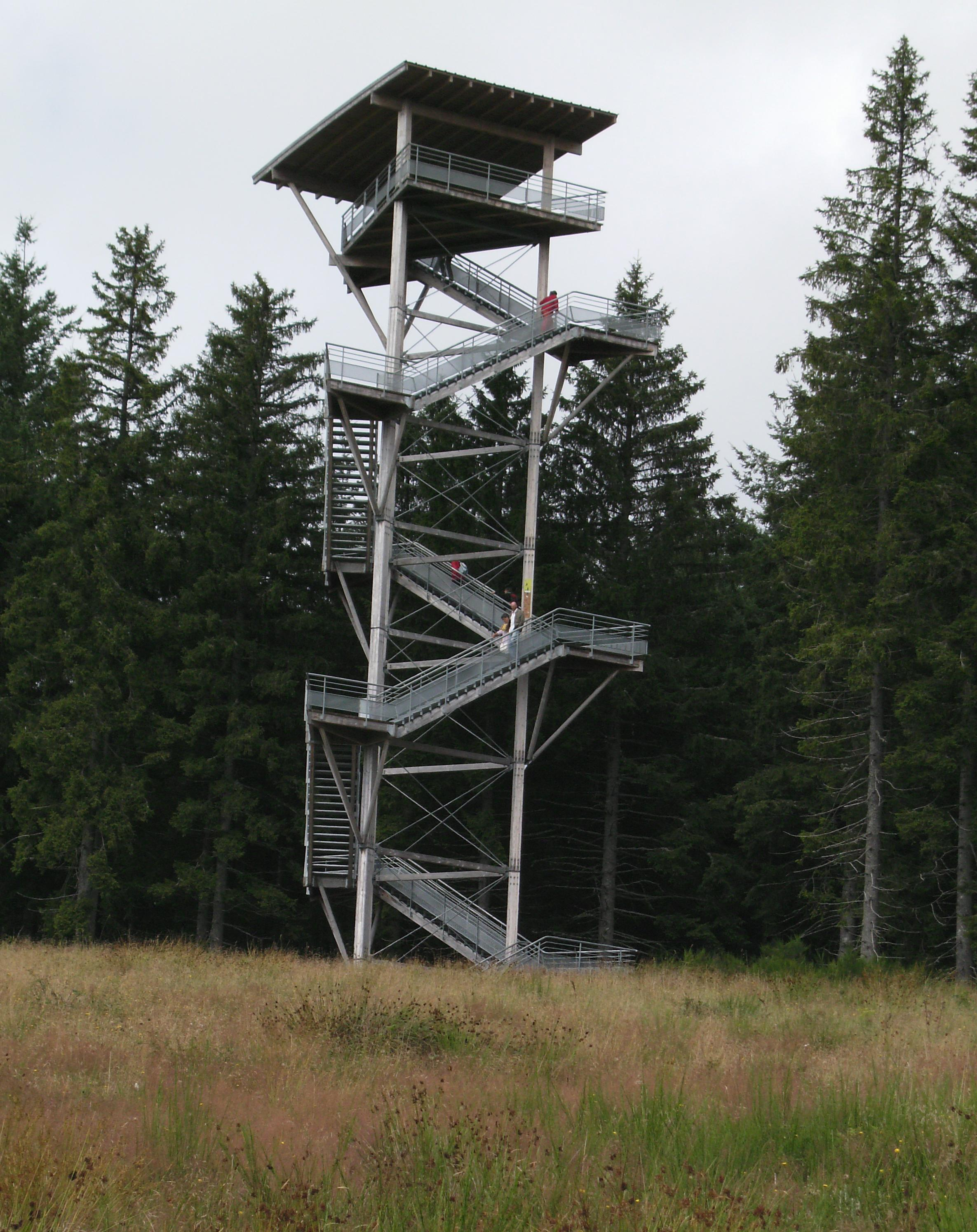
The iconic Mont Bessou viewing tower, at the highest point on the plateau, just to the north of Meymac.

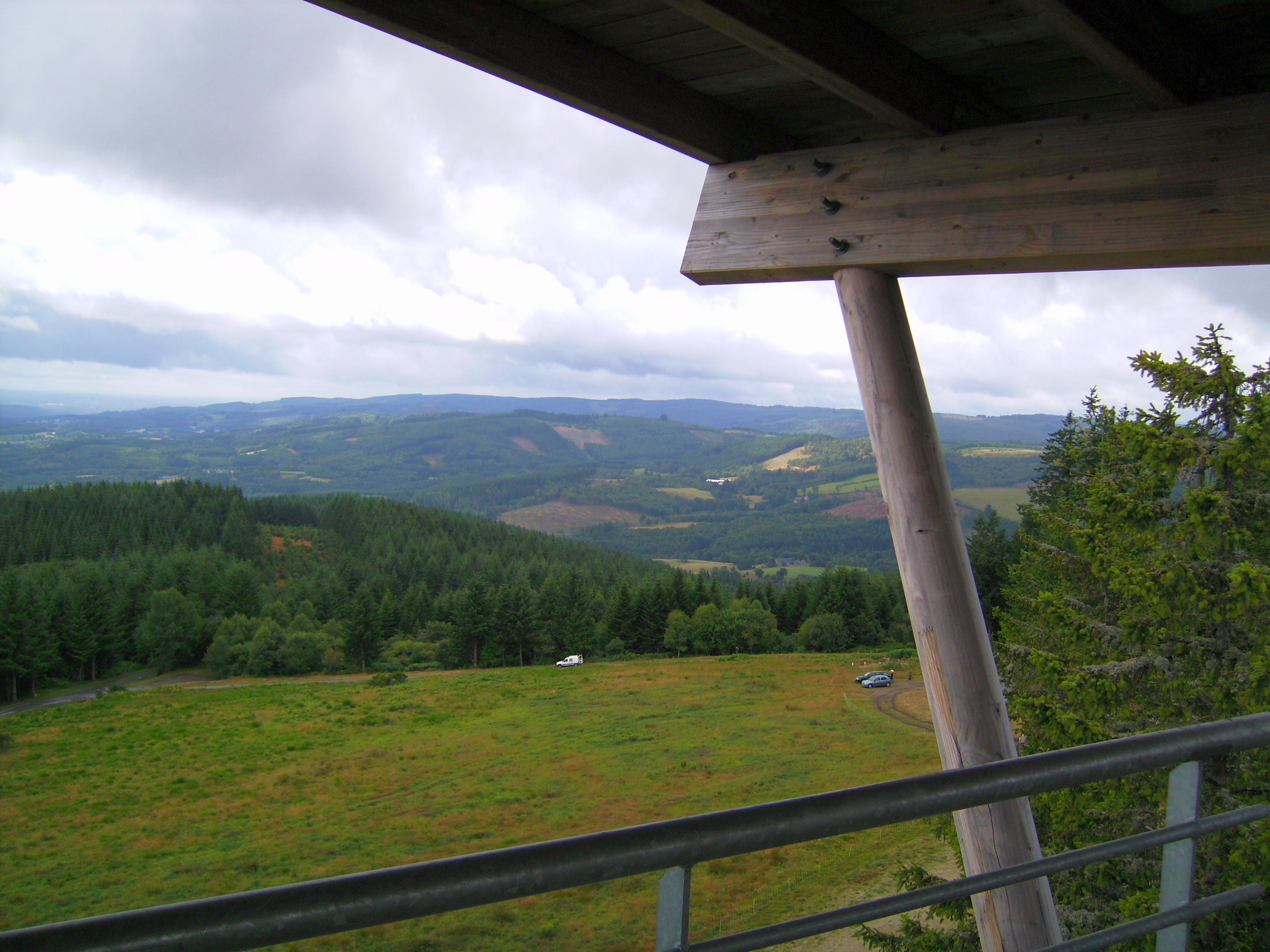
View south, over the edge of the plateau and towards the Cantal mountains, from the Mont Bessou viewing tower.

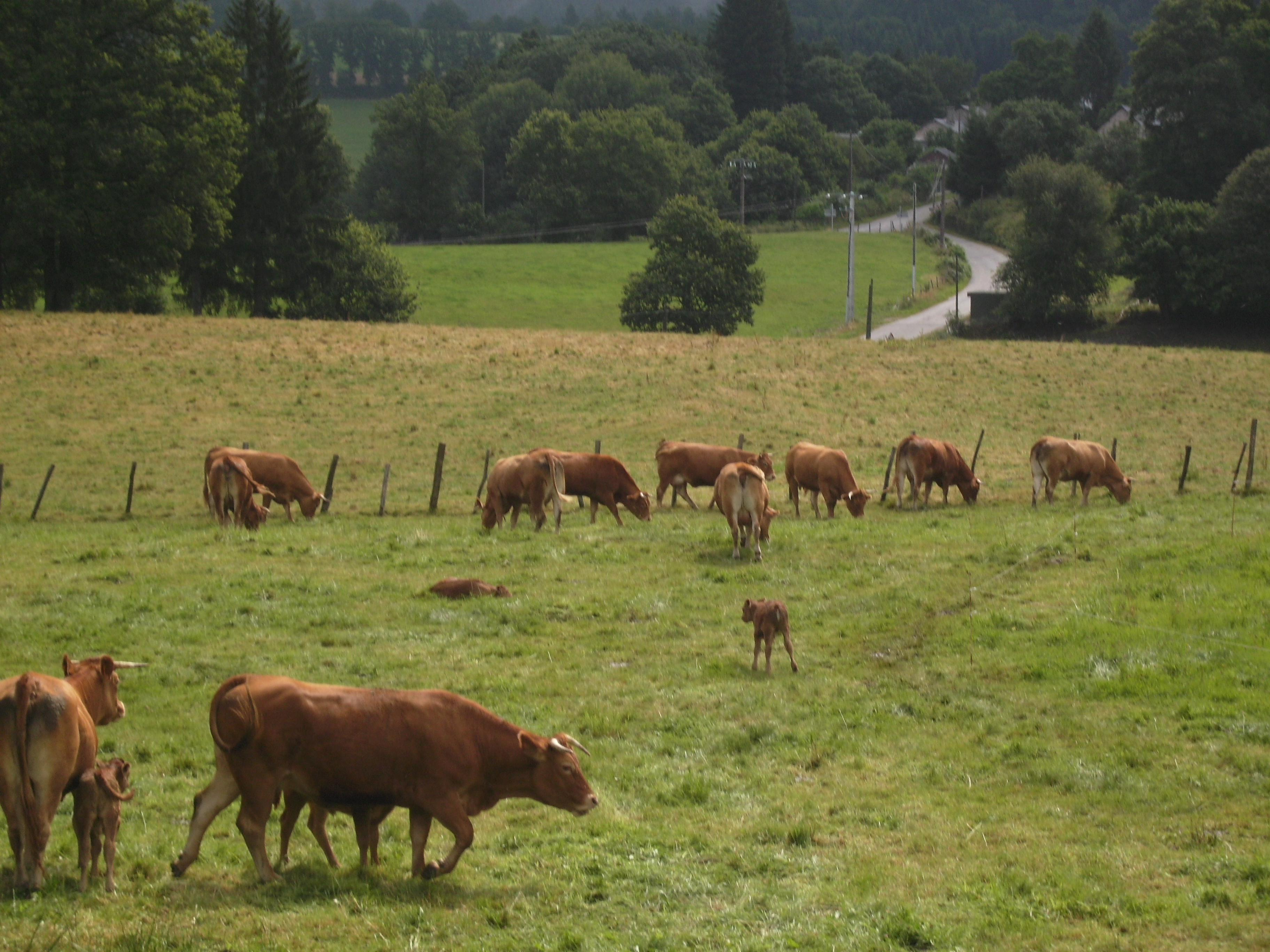
Limousin cattle grazing in the Vienne valley, near Rempnat.

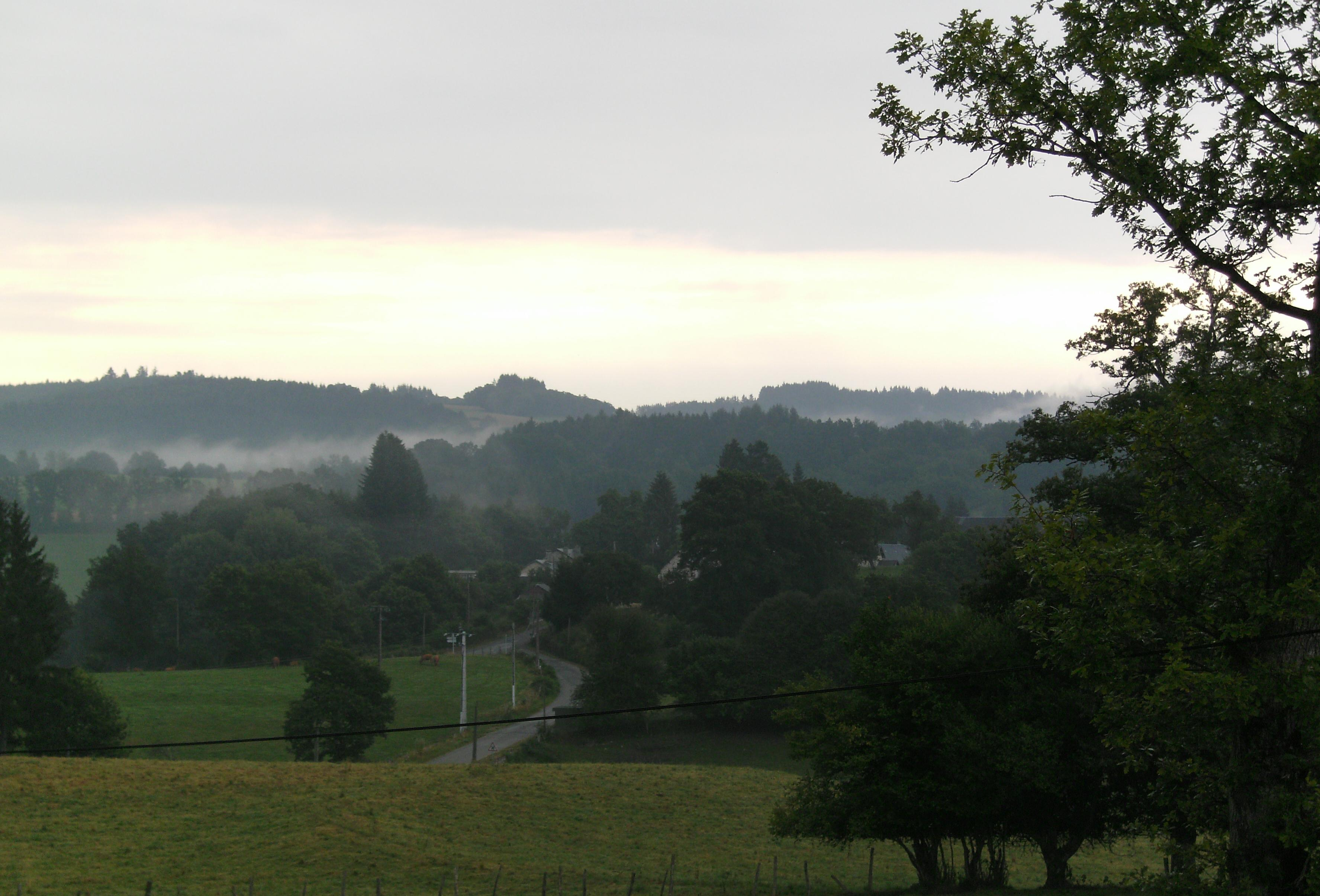
A misty summer morning near Rempnat - normal in this region because of the combination of heat and rainfall.

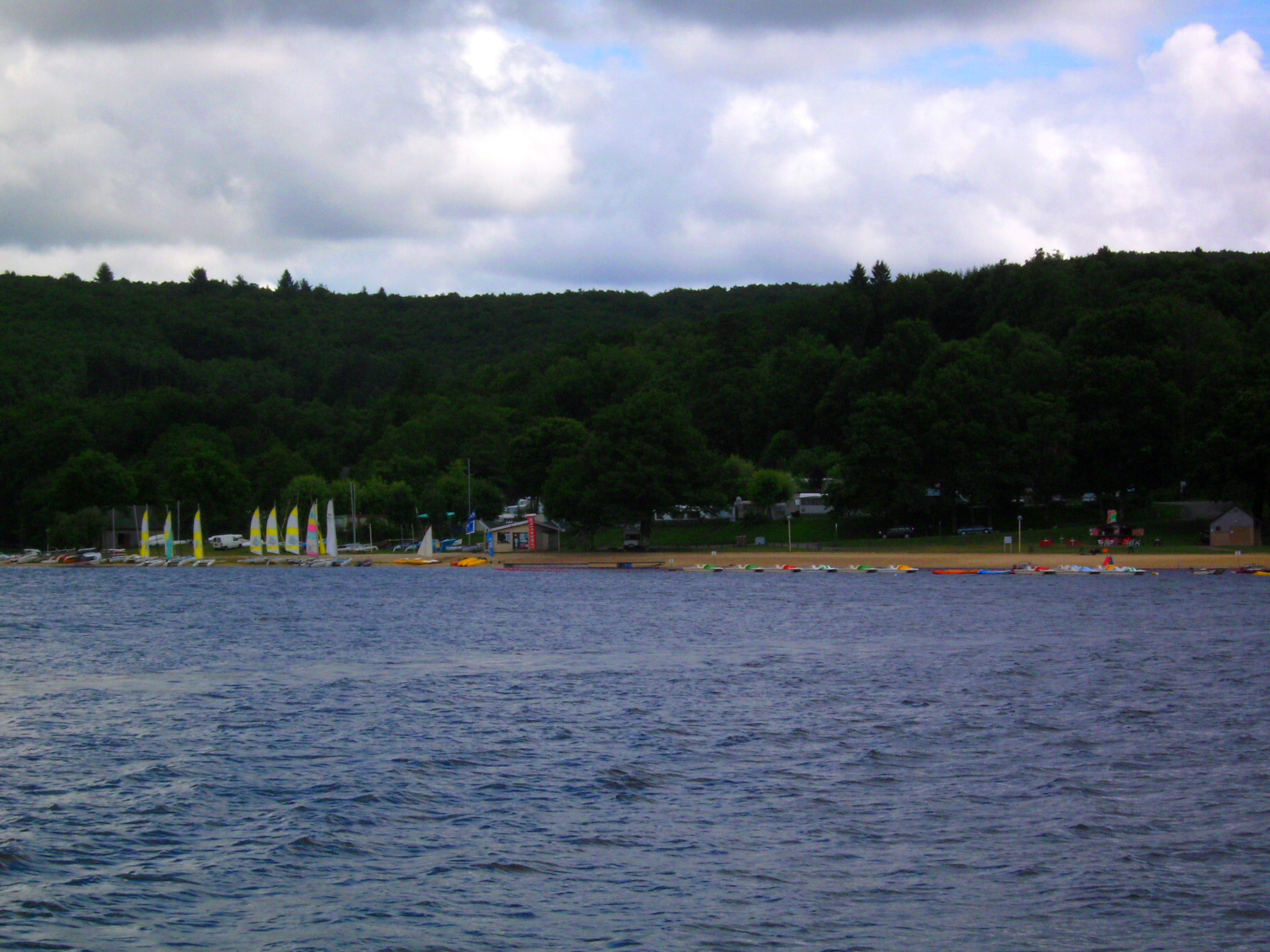
One of the many leisure beaches on the Lac de Vassivière.

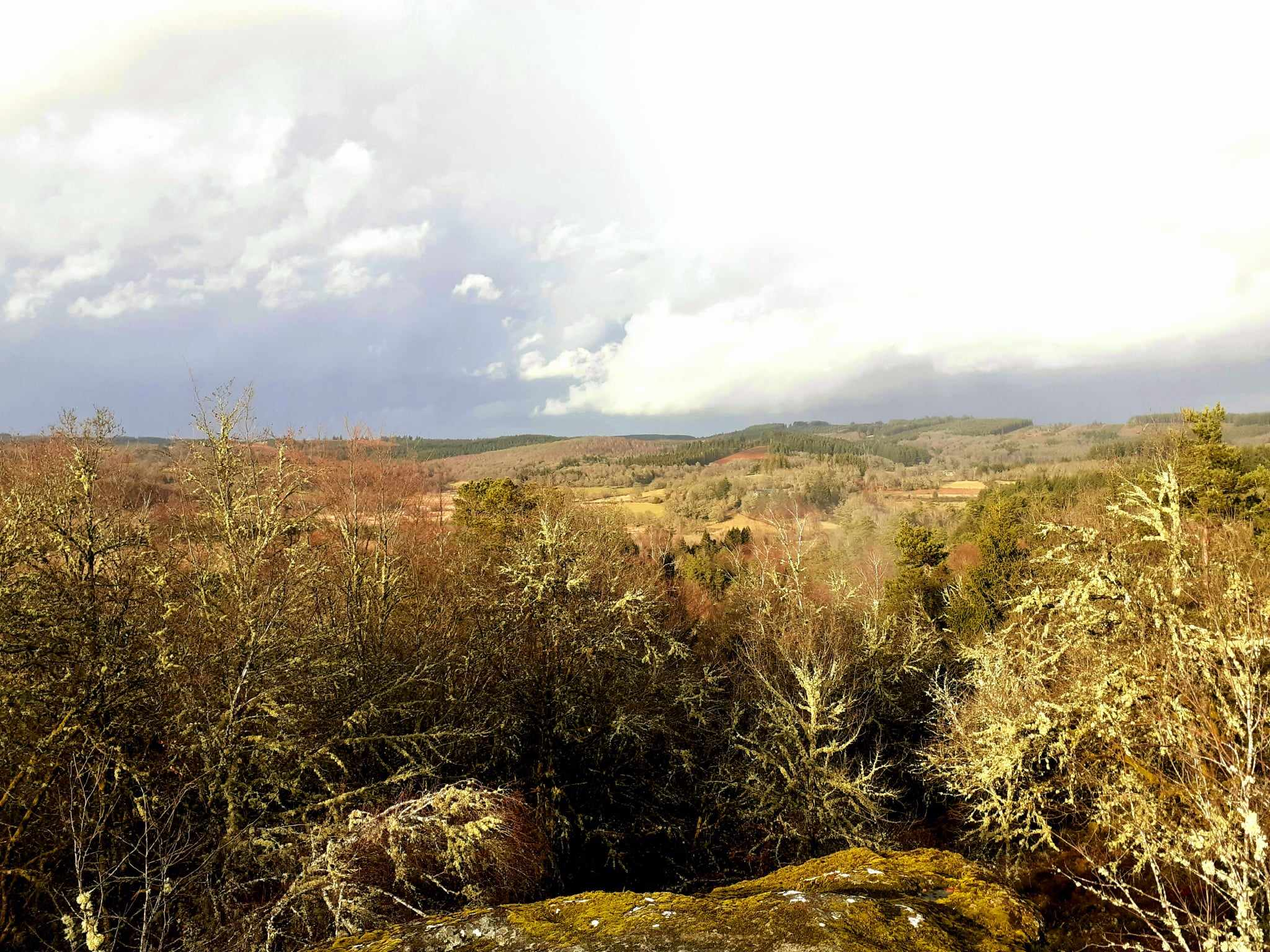
Wooded hills in winter near Gentioux-Pigerolles.
