= Mont Bessou viewing tower =

Coordinates: 45.5705°N 2.126°E

The Mont Bessou viewing tower is a purpose-built panoramic tower, north of the town of Meymac in the Corrèze department of the Limousin (region) of France

== Location ==
The tower is situated in the Forest of Mirambel, on the raised south-eastern edge of the Plateau de Millevaches. It is set in an area of woodland belonging jointly to the department of Corrèze and the commune of Meymac, at an altitude of approximately 1000 metres. It overlooks and affords wide vistas across the lower area between the plateau and the Cantal mountains. Both the town of Meymac and the more distant and larger town of Ussel are easily visible.

== History ==
The tower was planned on the initiative of the departmental and regional councils. The consulting architect was François Bonnin. It was opened on 17 June 2005.

== Construction ==
The construction of the tower was deliberately planned as a bringing together of modern design and traditional local materials. It is built of Douglas fir, braced with steel cables, and is triangular in plan. 188 steps and six intervening landings, take the visitor to the main viewing platform, which is 26 metres (85 ft) above the ground.

== Gallery ==
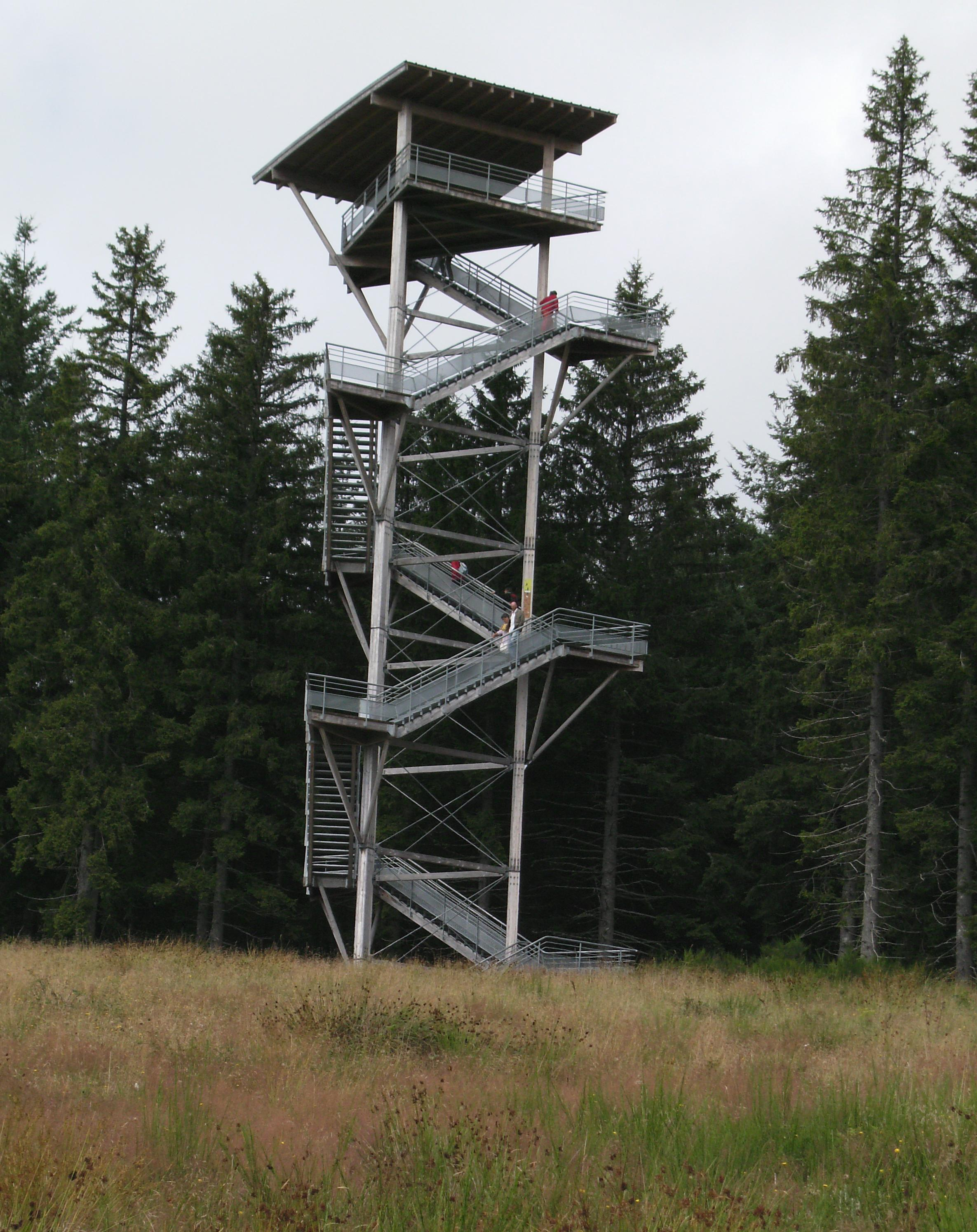
A general view of the tower.

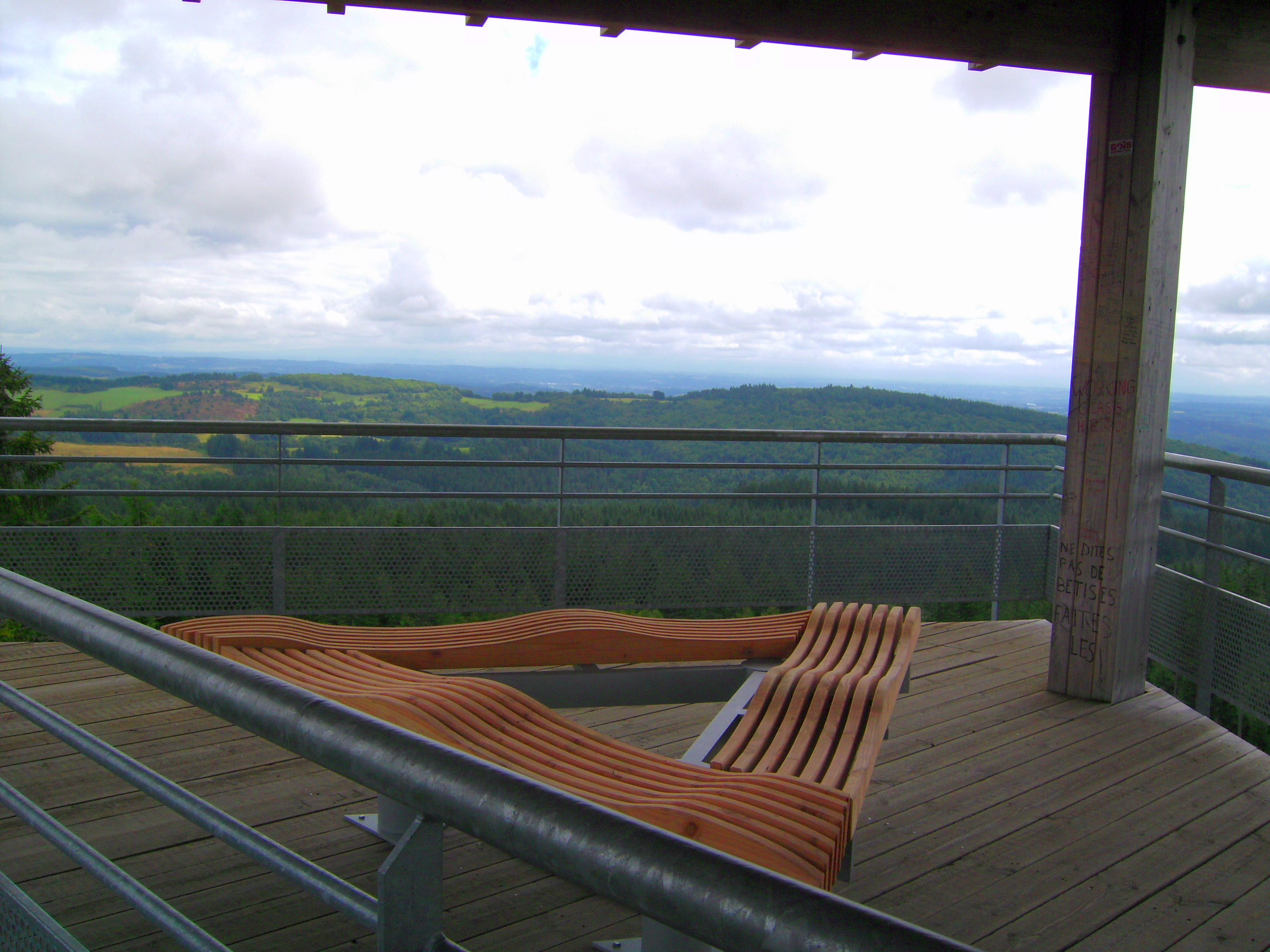
The main viewing platform.

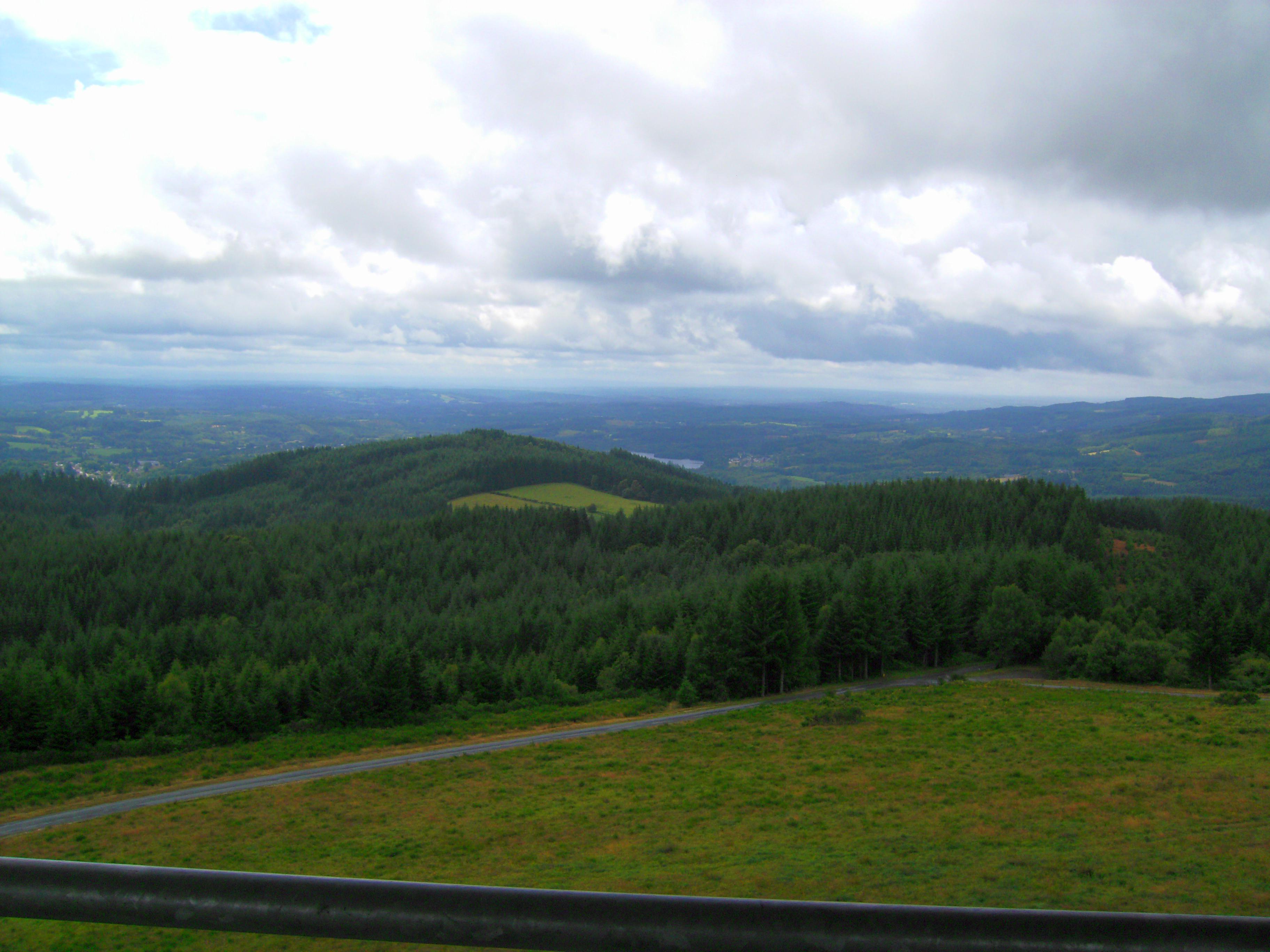
View towards Meymac.

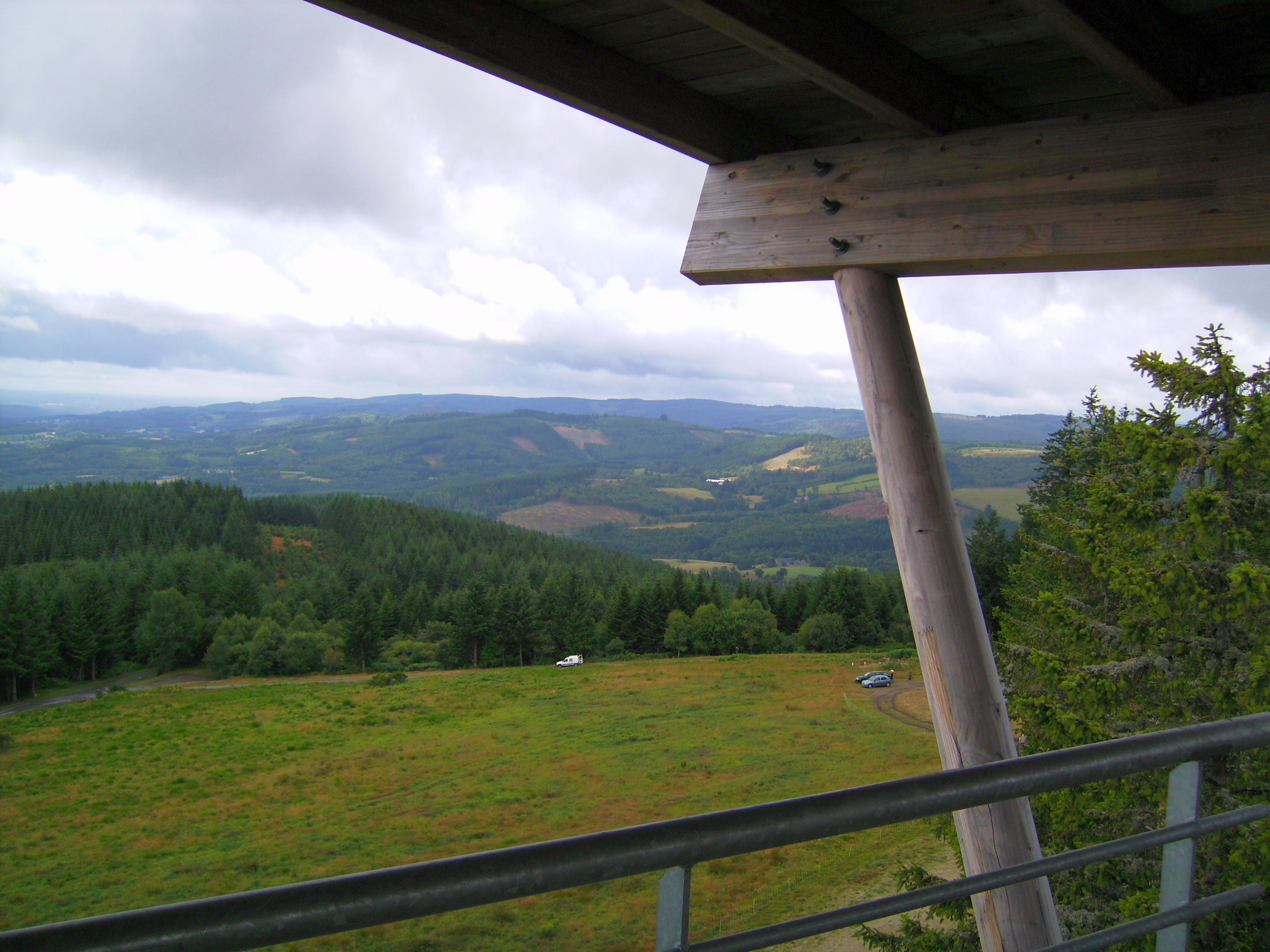
View south, over the edge of the plateau and towards the Cantal mountains.
