= Mont Bessou =

Mountain in Corrèze France

- Location within France Location within Europe

Highest point
- Elevation: 977 m (3,205 ft)
- Coordinates: 45°34′13″N 2°7′23″E

Geography
- Location: Corrèze departement, France
- Parent range: Plateau de Millevaches, (Massif Central)

Mont Bessou is a mountain in the Massif Central, France, located in the commune of Meymac, in the Corrèze department. With an altitude of 977m, it is the highest point of the Plateau de Millevaches situated on its south-eastern edge.

This high-point justified the creation of the Mont Besson viewing tower for tourists, offering a view to the east. There is also a large communications tower, which is the tallest construction in the Corrèze.

Almost entirely wooded, dominated by conifers, the landscape of Mont Bessou is representative of the flora of Limousin highlands, marked since the middle of the 20th-century by logging after having been grazing territories for extensive sheep farming.

== Toponymy ==
The toponym may have originated from the Occitan Bessou or Besson (meaning "twin"), Mont Bessou being frequently associated with another nearby summit of comparable altitude 970m, the Puy Pendu.

== History ==
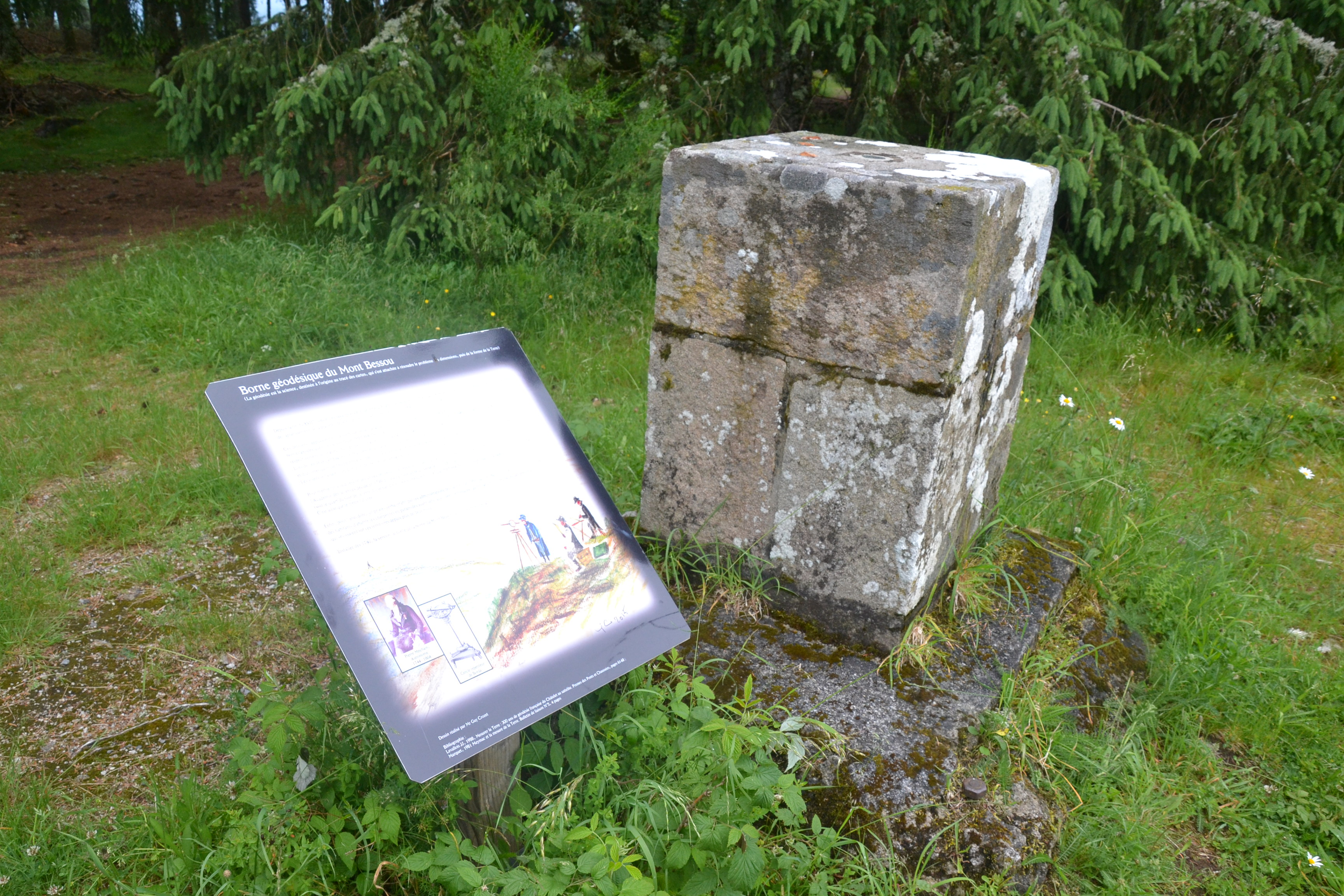
Geodesic marker, the first version of which dates from the 18th-century. The version in place is that of 1874.

In the 19th-century, Mont Bessou was already represented as the highest point of the Limousin mountains, notably in Eugène Cortambert's works on school geography, but it was listed with an altitude of 984m. In 1881, the soldier Gustave Léon Niox did the same, placing the Bessou in front of a mysterious "Mont de Meymac" which reached 978m. The erroneous altitude of 984m appears recurrently in editions devoted to teaching, such as by Lejosne in 1878, until the beginning of the 20th-century, or in Mame again in 1910. The measure was finally corrected when the Bureau des Longitudes reported an altitude of 978m for the first time in its 1909 directory, after having until then, published the altitude at 984m.

Mostly covered with moorland in the middle of the 19th-century, Mont Bessou was partially wooded from 1873 when agricultural land was abandoned. In 1901, written testimonies report pine stands damaged by snow; a cut was made in 1922.

At the beginning of the 20th-century, Mont Bessou, which was owned by the municipality, was partly wooded; larch and spruce were cut there. The dominant landscape, however, remained heather heathland until the 1940s. Between 1925 and 1955, the summit of the mountain was irregularly planted with Silver fir, Douglas fir and Common spruce. The winter of 1968-1969, particularly snowy, caused the loss of trees. In 1973, regular forests of the same species were planted this time as part of the National Forest Fund.

In the 1970s, Mont Bessou was equipped with a ski rental chalet for cross-country skiing. Other tourist developments, including the creation of a lake, a picnic area and trails, which were established in 1973.

The summit part of the forest of Mount Bessou is public; since 1997, after being covered by a communal and sectional forest, it had been the property of a forestry trade union group, the GSF du Mont Bessou, was brought together in equal parts the Departmental Council of Corrèze and the municipality of Meymac, that manage and operates an area of 61ha. A quarter of the forest area was decimated by the storm of December 1999, before regeneration work reversed this loss in the following decade.

=== Antennas ===
The summit of Mount Bessou is occupied by the right-of-way of a large radio and television transmitter, built in 1973, and recognizable by its two-tone white and red paint. It is the property of the TDF Group.

Another more recent antenna, initially owned by the company Itas TIM, bought in 2016 by TDF, transmitted television only. As a result of this acquisition, the dismantling of the second antenna was carried out in October 2024.

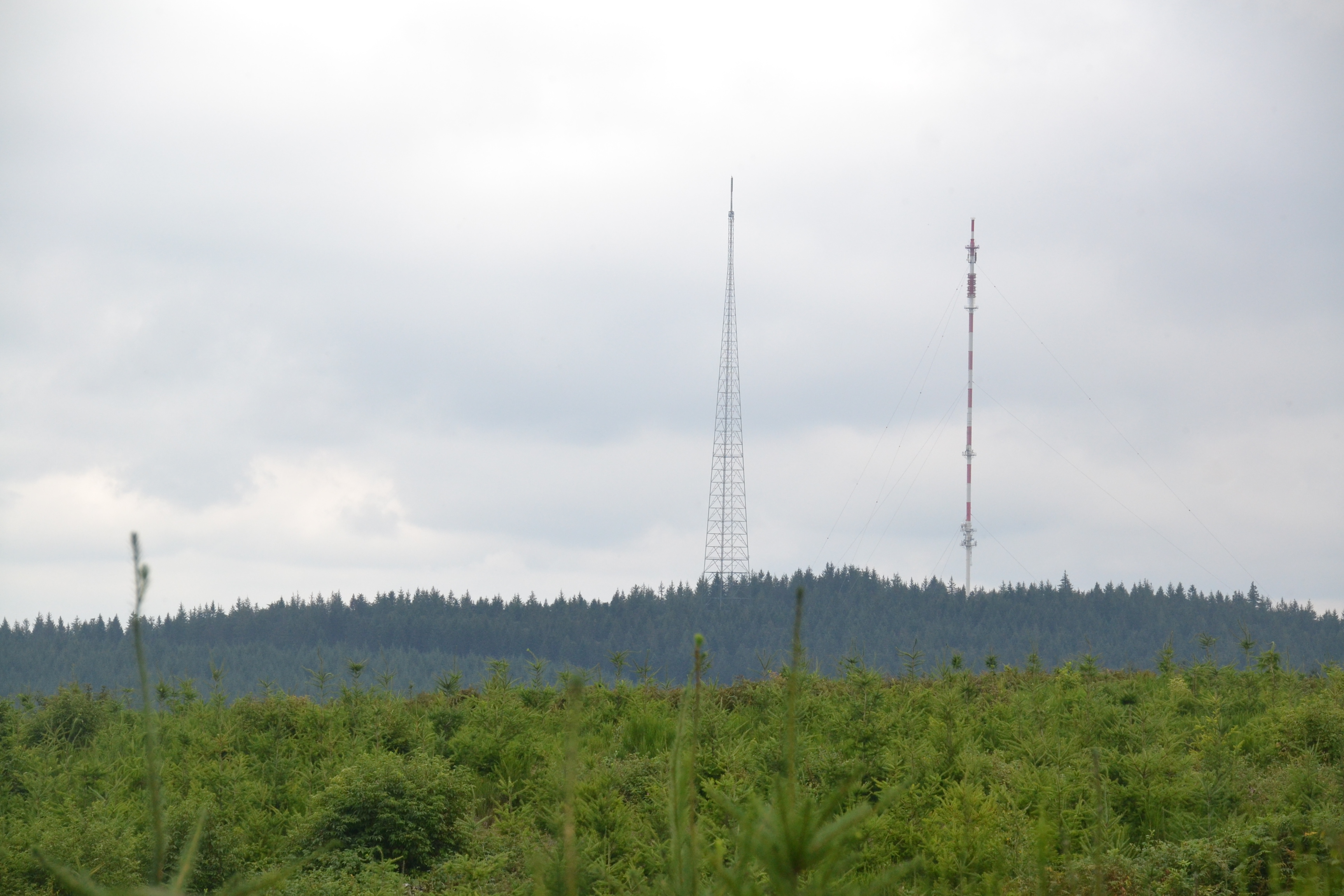
The two antennas.

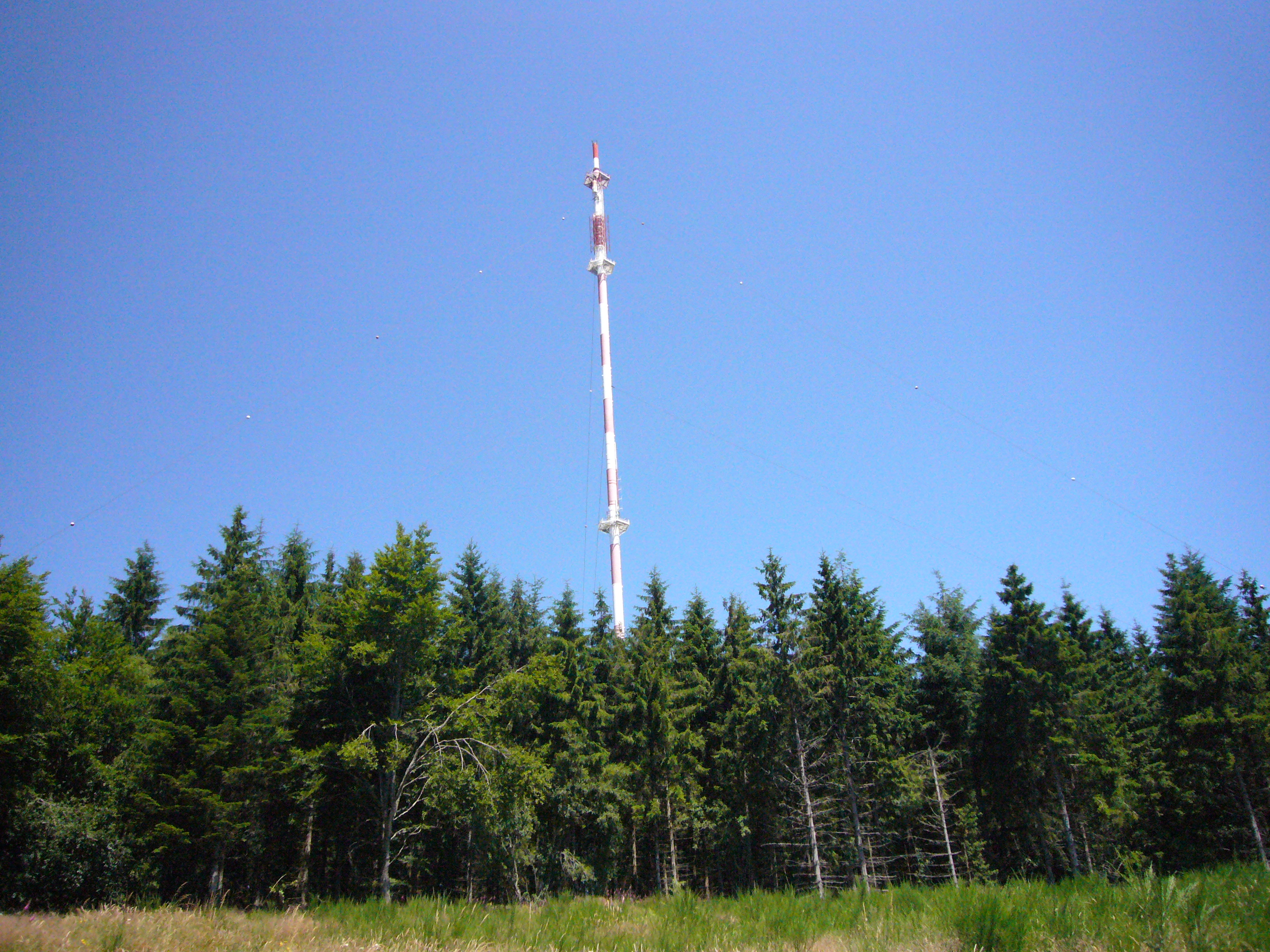
The main transmitter.

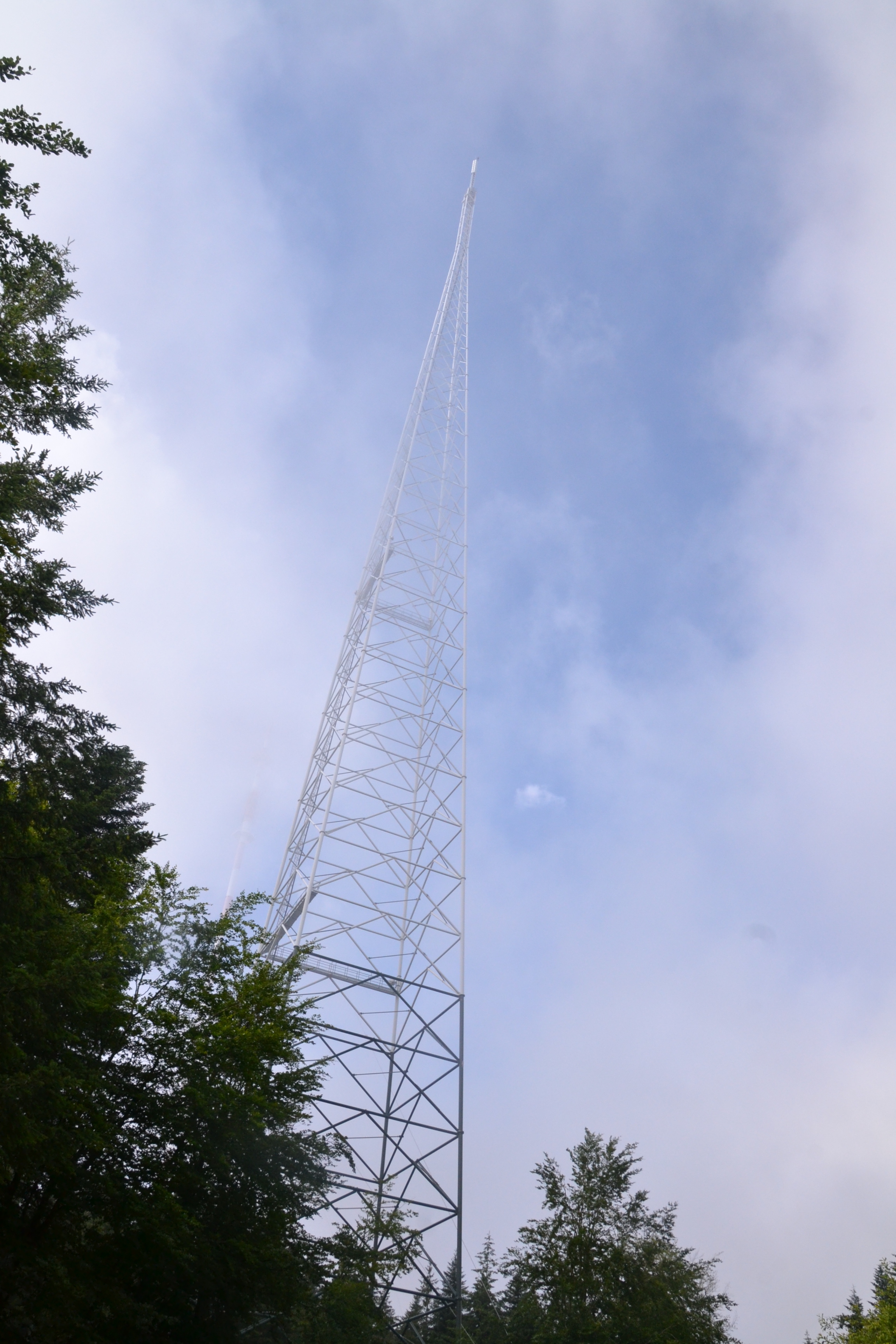
The second transmitter.

== Geography ==
=== Location ===
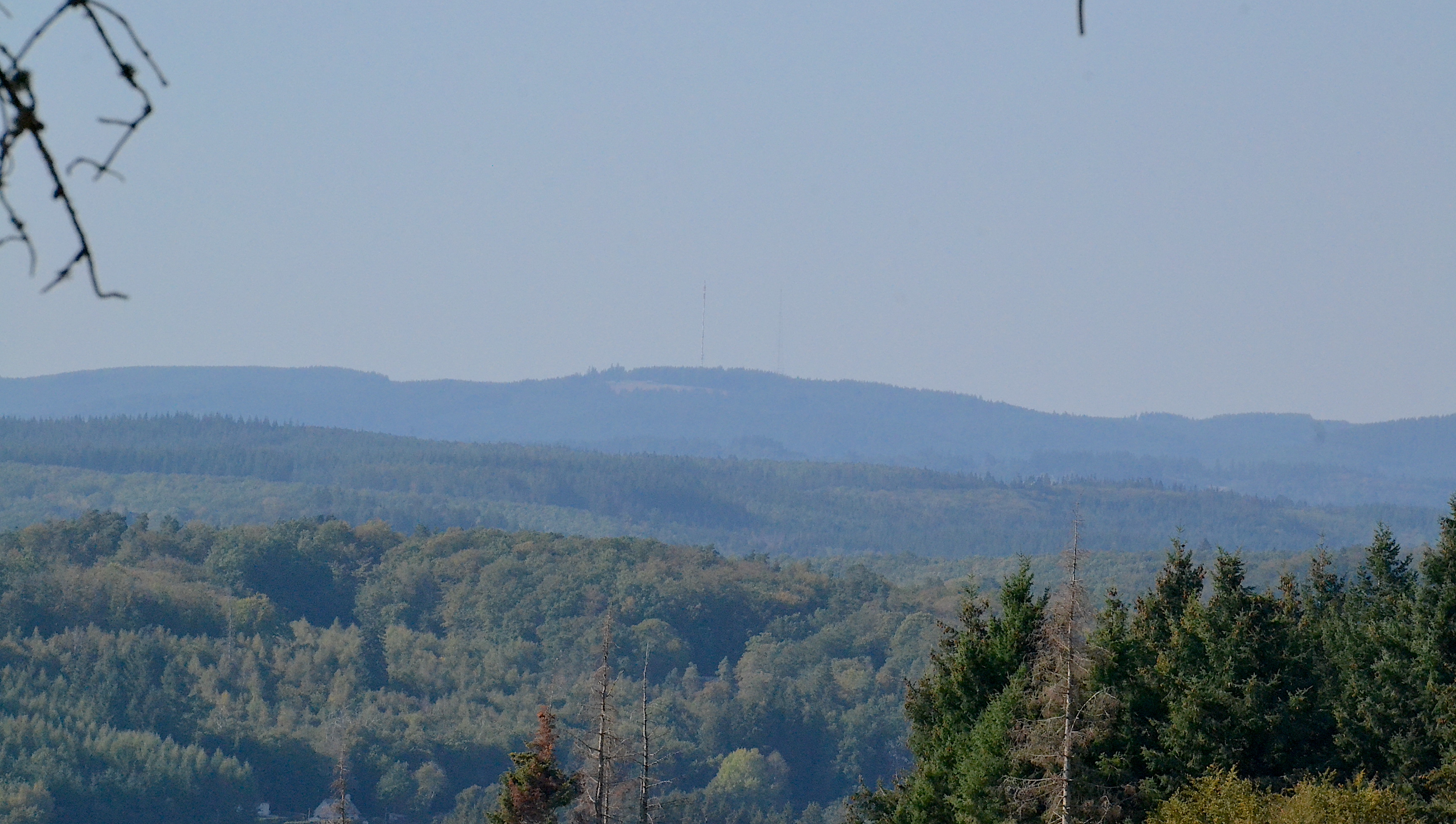
Mount Bessou seen from the Puy de Manzagol, about 24km to the southeast.

Mount Bessou is part of the Massif Central, and within it, to the Plateau de Millevaches, a vast granite plateau that occupies the northern Corrèze and southern Creuse. It is located on its south-eastern border, and thus dominates the secondary plateau which, to the east, separates the Millevaches highlands from the Dordogne valley by about 250 to 300m. It is at its foot of Mont Bessou, at the beginning of this secondary, intermediate plateau, sometimes described as the "Corrèze plateau(s) or Corrèze highlands", that the town of Meymac is located, the capital of the commune. The centre of Meymac is about 4km as the crow flies from the summit of Mont Bessou. On its western flank, Mount Bessou is only weakly prominent, the Plateau de Millevaches where the average altitude oscillates between 850 and 950m.

Mont Bessou is the highest of the peaks of the Corrèze. As such, it is also the highest point of the Limousin mountains, which bring together the plateaus and hills of the former Limousin province (south of Haute-Vienne and Corrèze), ranging from the Charente Limousin in the west to the Dordogne gorges in the east). It is also the highest point of the Limousin Mountain (which includes all the highlands of the Limousin, understood in its contemporary cultural sense, i.e. the grouping of the departments of the former administrative region). It also belongs to the Parc Naturel Régional de Millevaches en Limousin.

You have to go about 40km to the east to find higher land than Mont Bessou, in the Tauves sector (Puy-de-Dôme).

From the panoramas it offers, the geographer Michel Périgord classifies it among the "exceptional landscapes" of the Limousin.

=== Landscapes ===
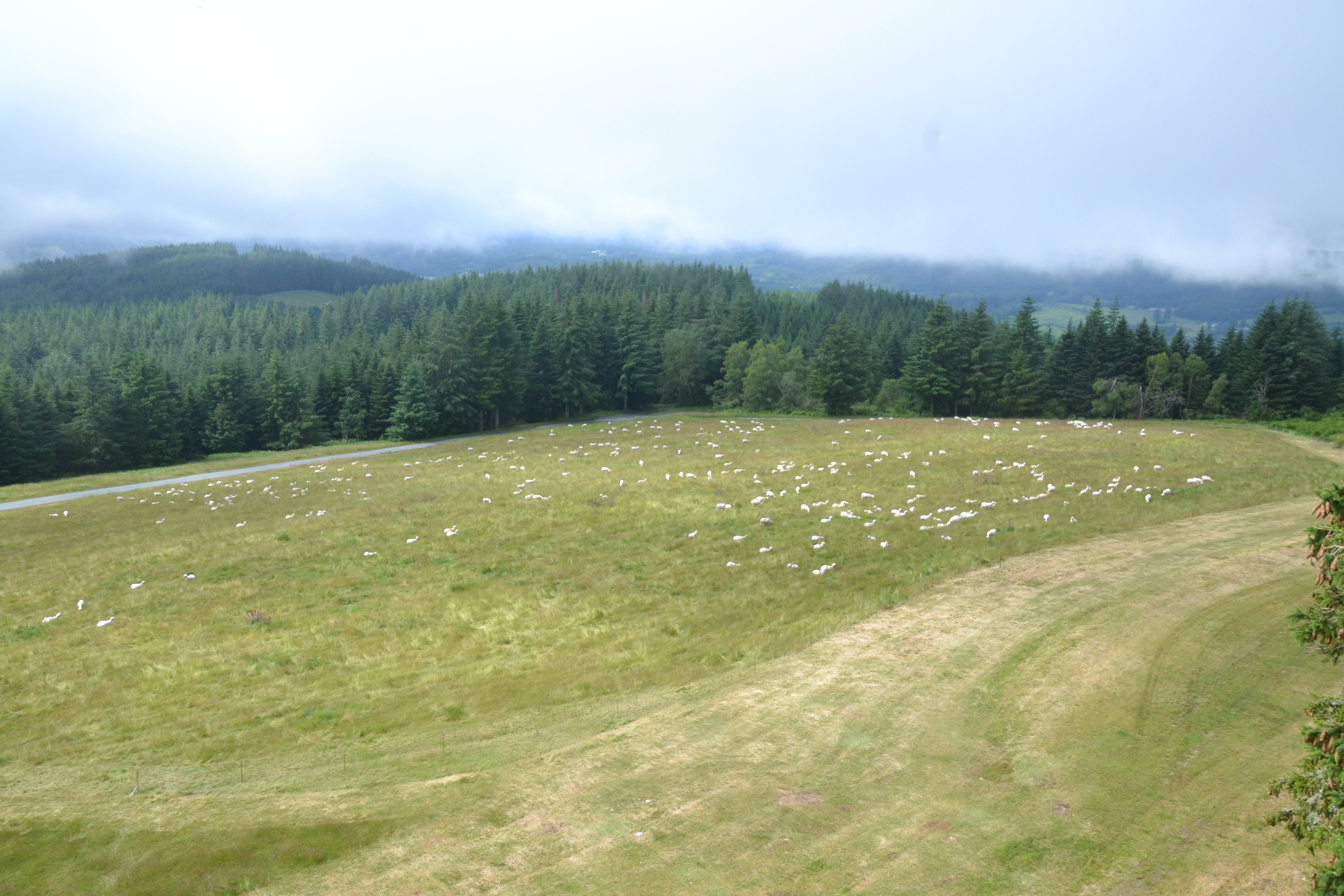
Landscape of pasture and planted forest at the top of Mont Besson.

Mount Bessou is almost entirely occupied by planted and logged forest, divided between Silver Fir and Douglas Fir, and marginally, Sitka spruce.

A plot of meadow is preserved at the foot of the panoramic tower, and allows sheep to graze.

Mont Bessou is on the list of sites of ecological and landscape interest (SIEP) of the Parc Naturel Régional de Millevaches en Limousin.

=== Protection ===
Mount Bessou is not included in any regulatory protection perimeter. However, part of the northern foot of the mountain is recognised as natural area by the Zone naturelle d'intérêt écologique, faunistique et floristique (ZNIEFF) in the upper Vézère basin.

== Activities ==
=== Cycling ===
Mont Bessou was on the programme of the climbs of the 9th-stage of the 2026 Tour de France, which links Malemort-sur-Corrèze to Ussel. Dutchman Mathieu van der Poel took the lead at the top, before winning the stage.

=== Tourism ===
From the 2000s, Mount Bessou was developed to promote the practice of outdoor sports and green tourism.

==== Panoramic tour ====
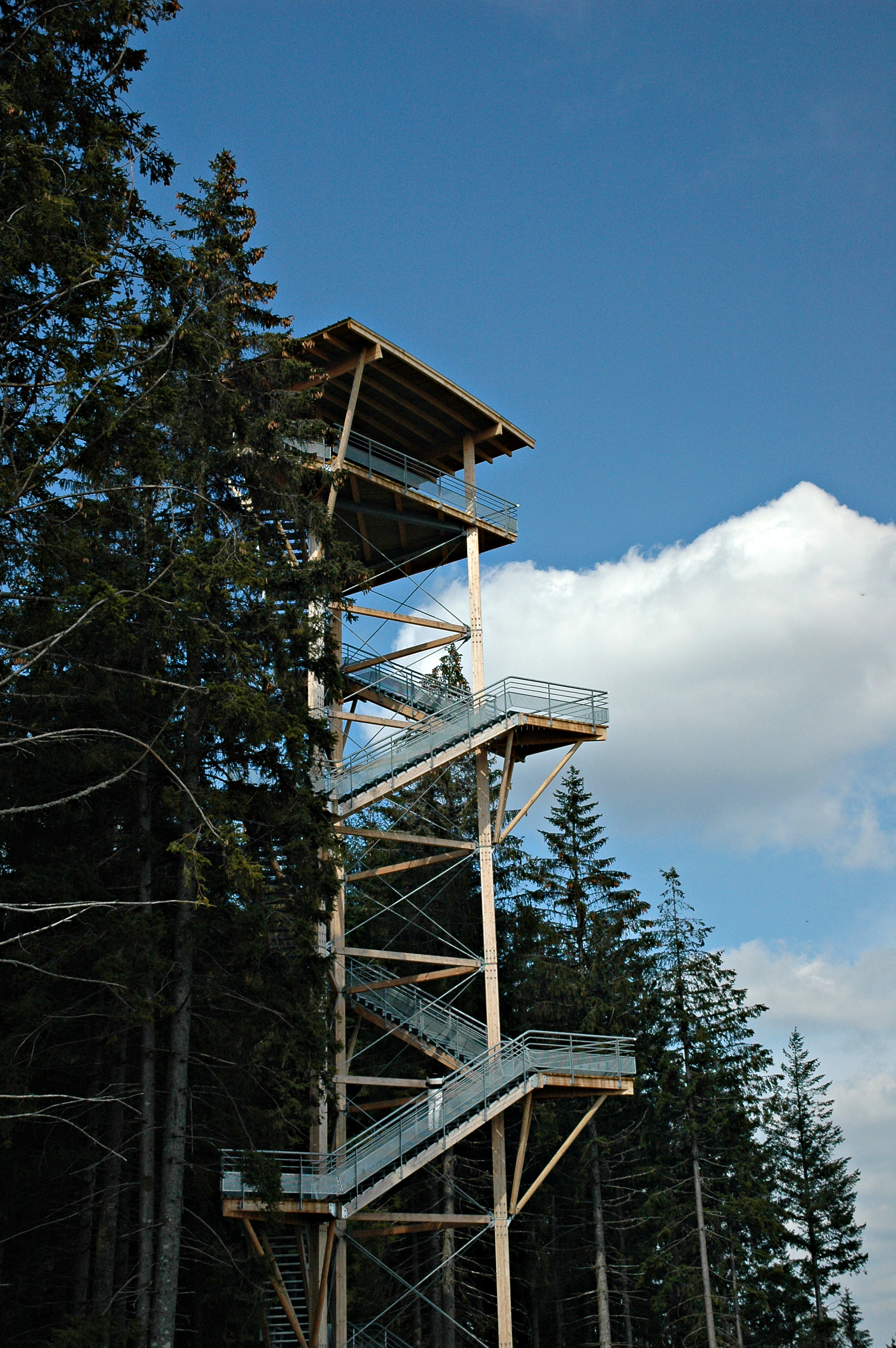
The panoramic tower of Mount Bessou.

Following the first wooden tower project in 1969, a panoramic tower was built at the top of Mount Bessou in 2005, on the edge of a meadow whose origin dates back to the storm of December 1999 which uprooted some of the conifers at the top of the mountain, thus providing a wide view of the surroundings. The tower was inaugurated on 17 June 2005 by Jean-Pierre Dupont, then president of the Departmental Council of Corrèze, his vice-president, Georges Pérol, as well as Serge Vialle, mayor of Meymac and François Bonnin, architect in charge of the project.

This 26m, Douglas fir tower, allows visitors to symbolically reach an altitude of 1,000m. 148 steps and 7 landings with each landing decorated with panels detailing the heritage characteristics of the site and its surroundings.

Its summit, equipped with information panels, offers a panorama of the region, particularly to the east, including the edge of the Plateau de Millevaches, the nearby town of Ussel and the mountains of the Auvergne: the Monts Dore (the Puy de Sancy, the Banne d'Ordanche), the Puy de Dôme and the Mounts of Cantal.

There is a scale model copy of the tower on a roundabout in Meymac, and the panoramic tower of Moncalou, located in the Dordogne in Florimont-Gaumier, is a replica of the tower of Mont-Bessou.

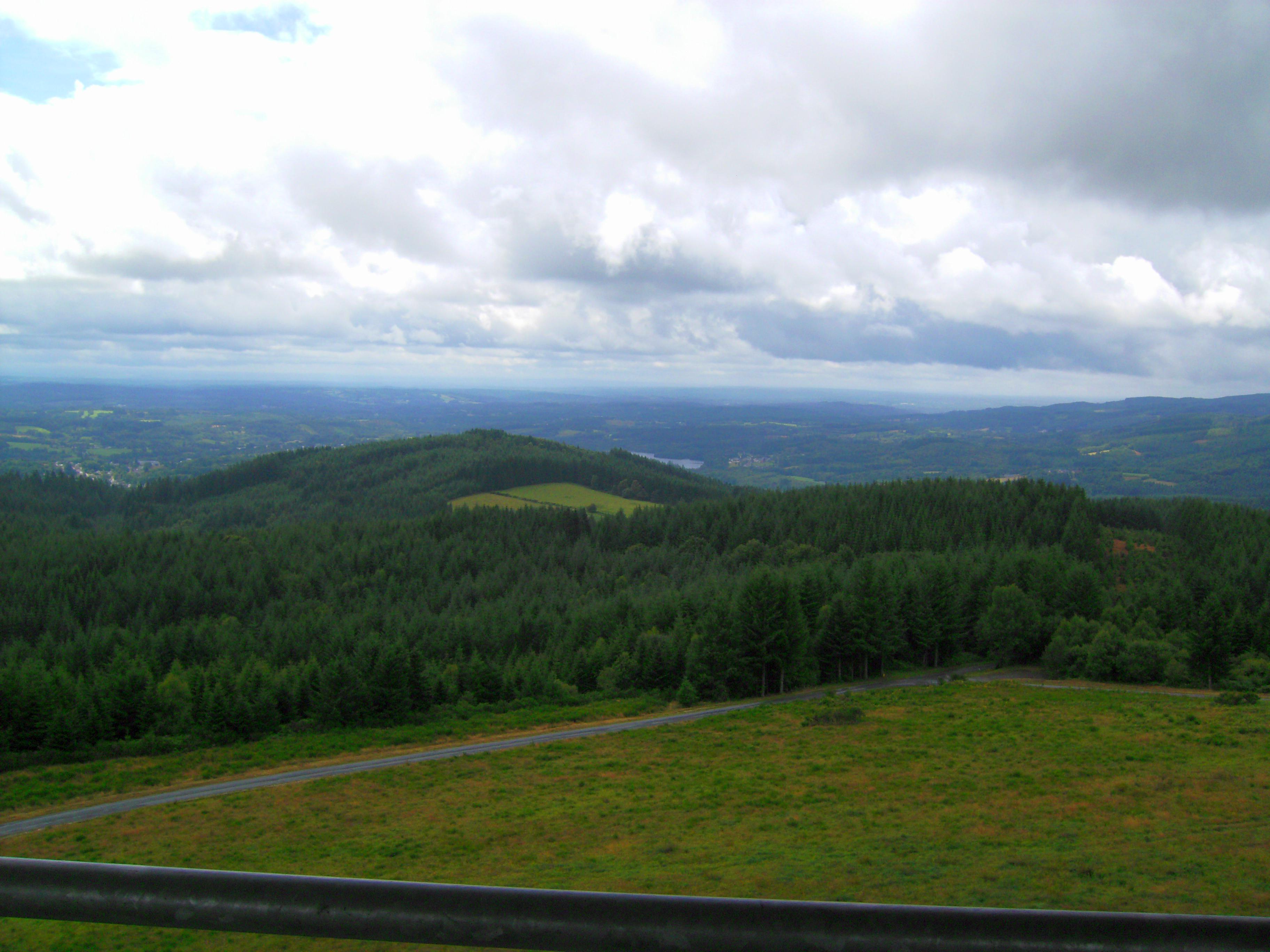
View to the south-east from the observation tower; in the middle of the image, the lake of Sèchemaille.

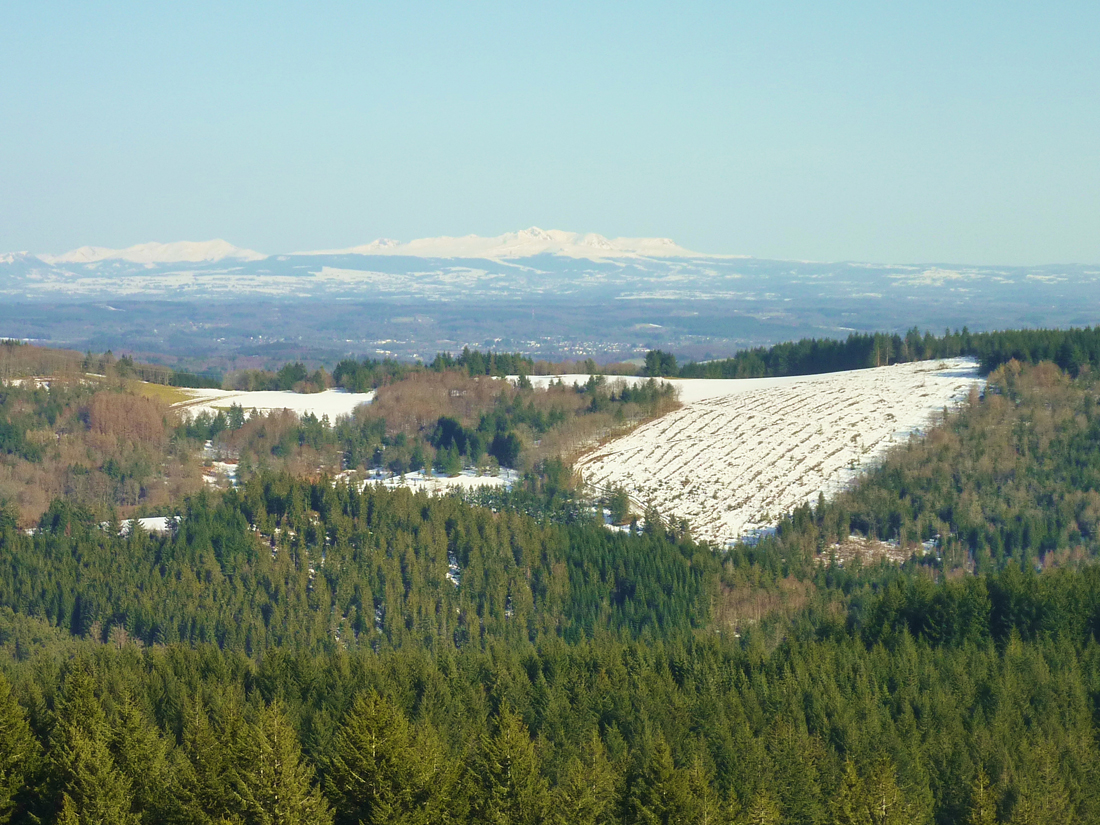
View of the Puy de Sancy from Mont Bessou.

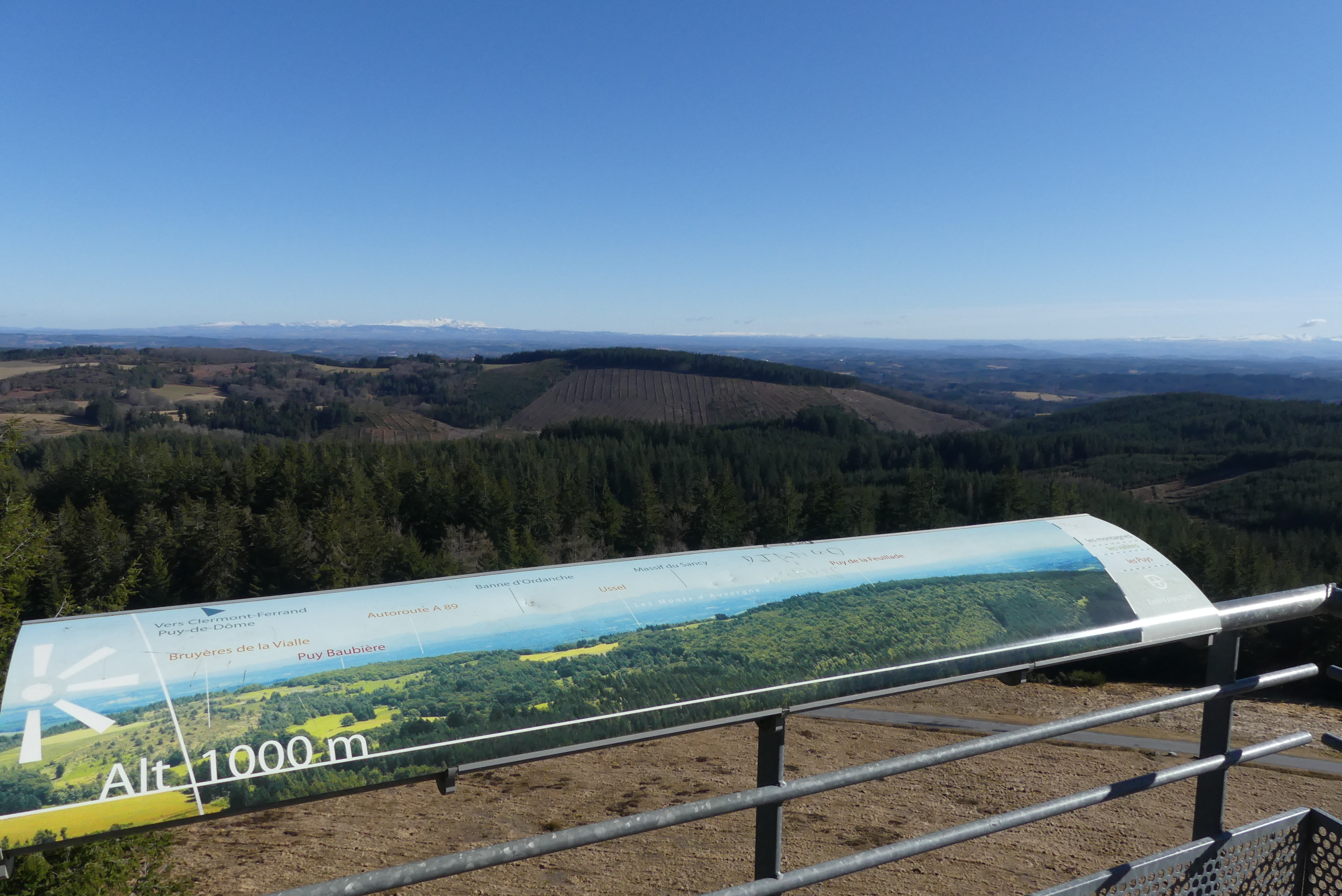
General overview.

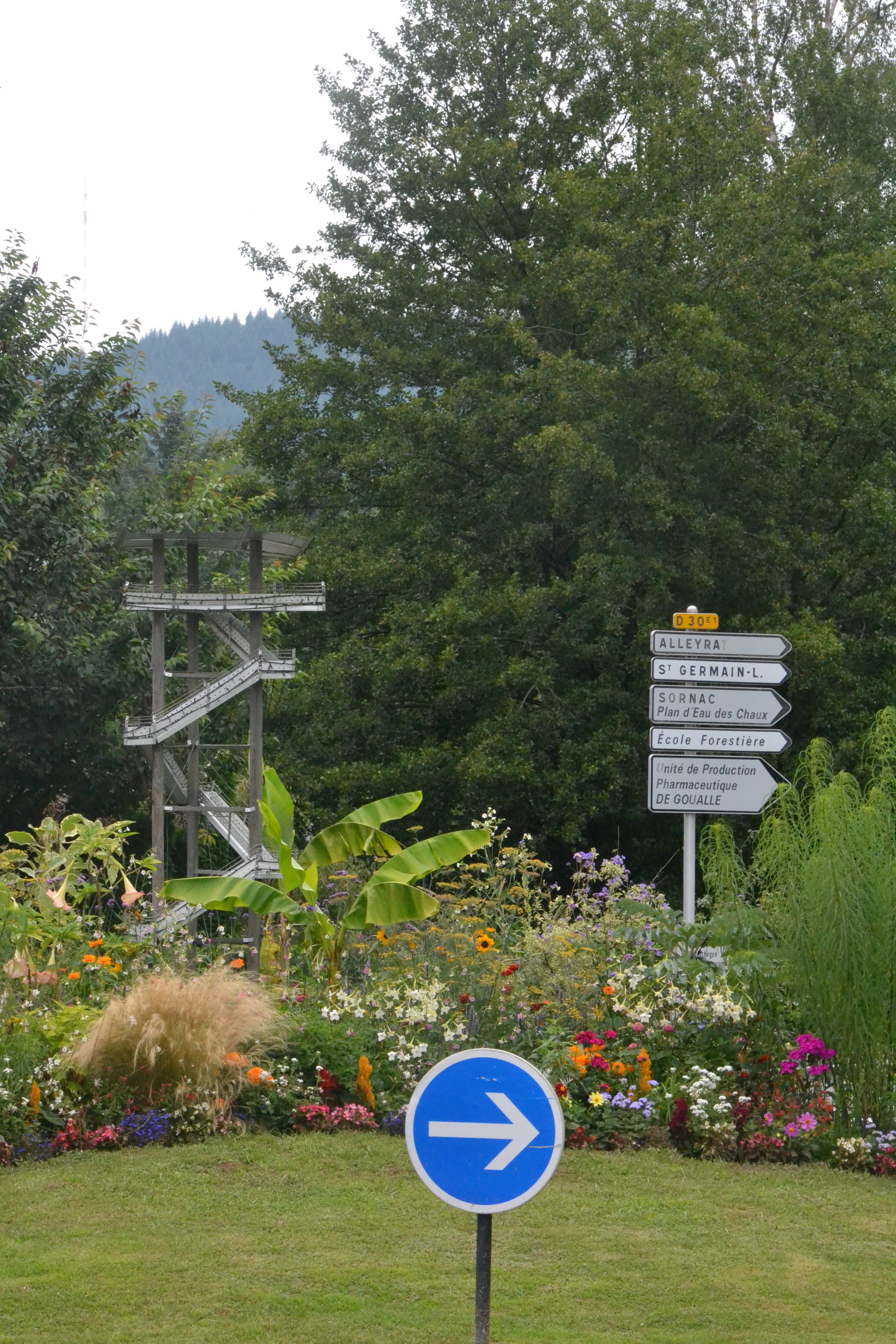
Model of the tower in Meymac.

==== Theme trails ====
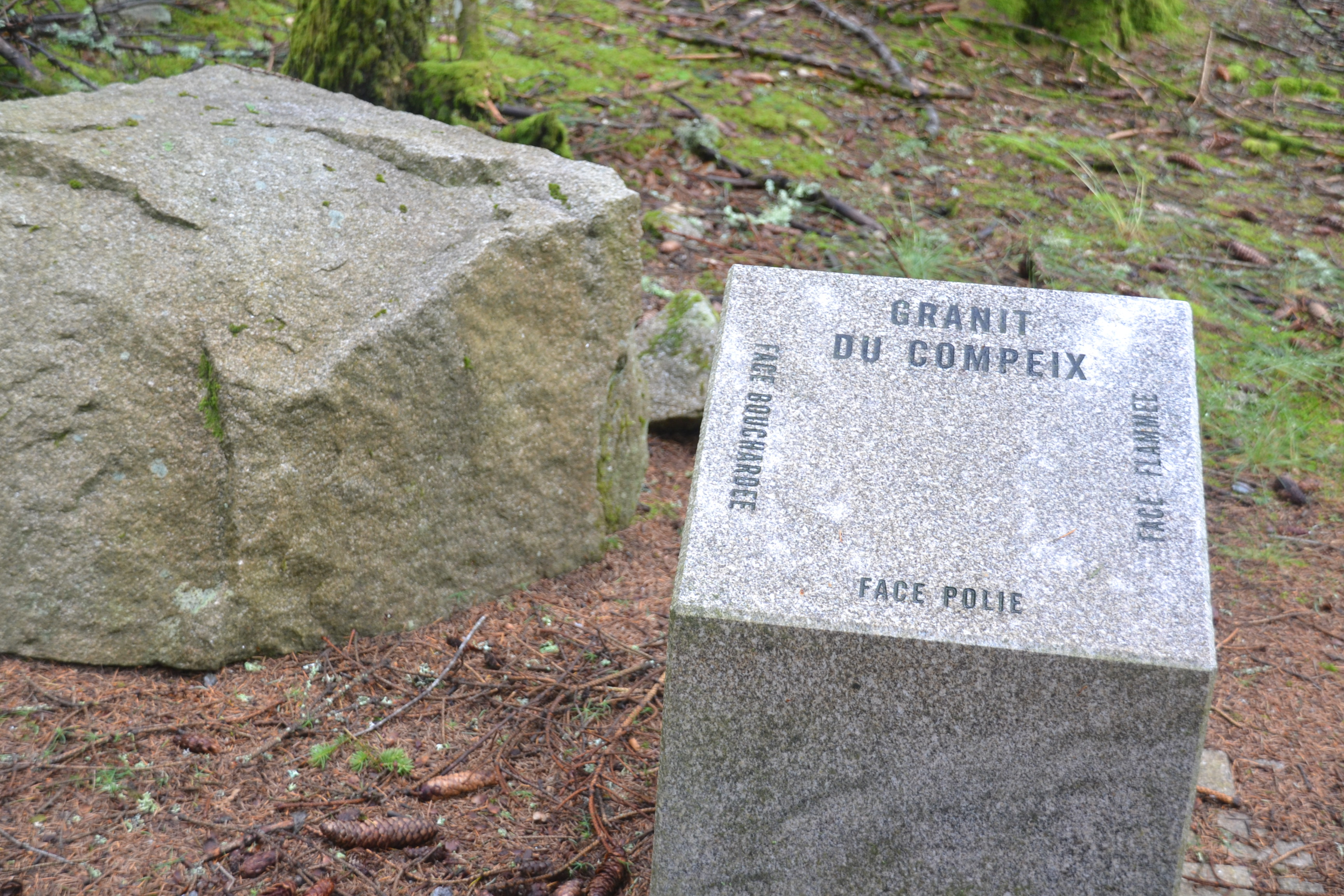
The granite trail.

Around the tower, there are two short interpretive trails equipped with explanatory bollards, one on the various varieties of mushrooms, which leads to the small body of water a little further down, and the other on the different granites, which winds up to the TDF tower. On these same paths, there are small rocks of Guéret granite.

==== Nature sports ====
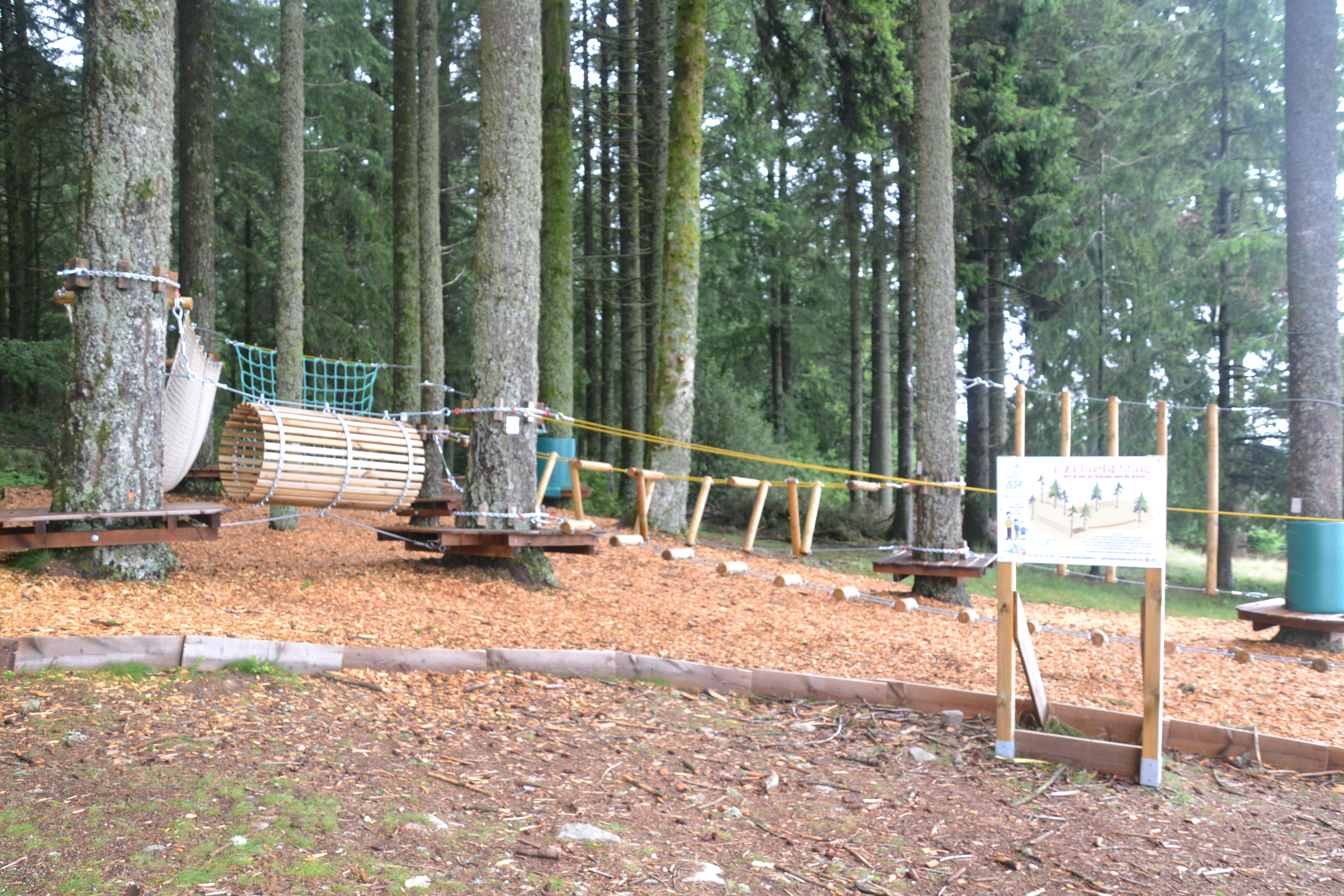
The "Acro-Bessou" mini-park.

In 2019, a 2,5km mountain bike trail was built on the mountain. It was part of a project for a large loop joining up with the lake and the Sèchemailles leisure centre, in Meymac.

An adventure park of a "tree climbing" type, intended for children, was established at the foot of the panoramic tower.

==== Other facilities ====
In 2018, an orientation table was installed at the entrance to the site, designed by the students of the Meymac forestry high school.

In the summer, a chalet or log-cabin, designed by the architect Jean Roques and inaugurated in 2013, welcomes visitors. There is a refreshment and snack shop and information on the activities in the area and occasional events taking place on the mountain.

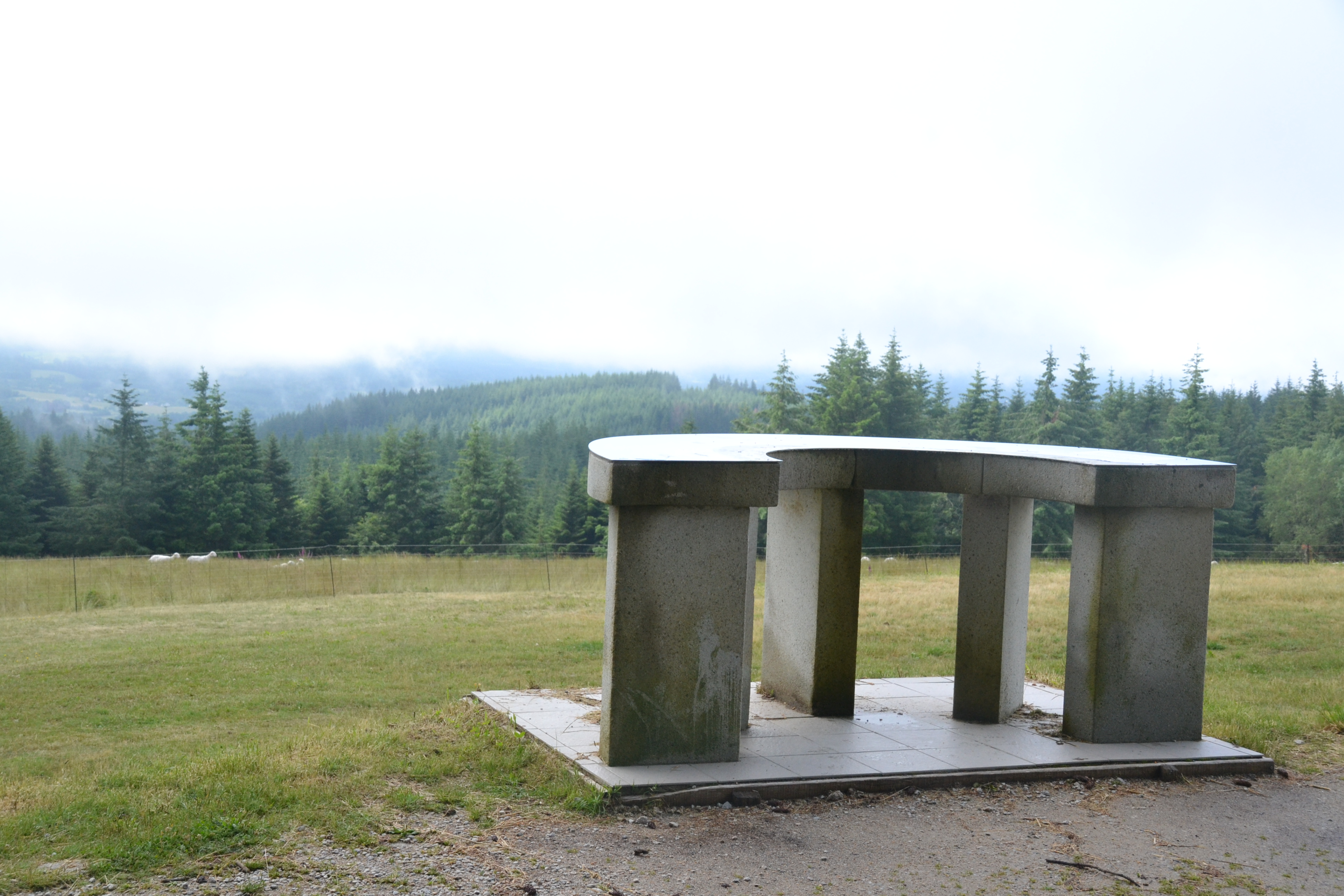
The orientation table.

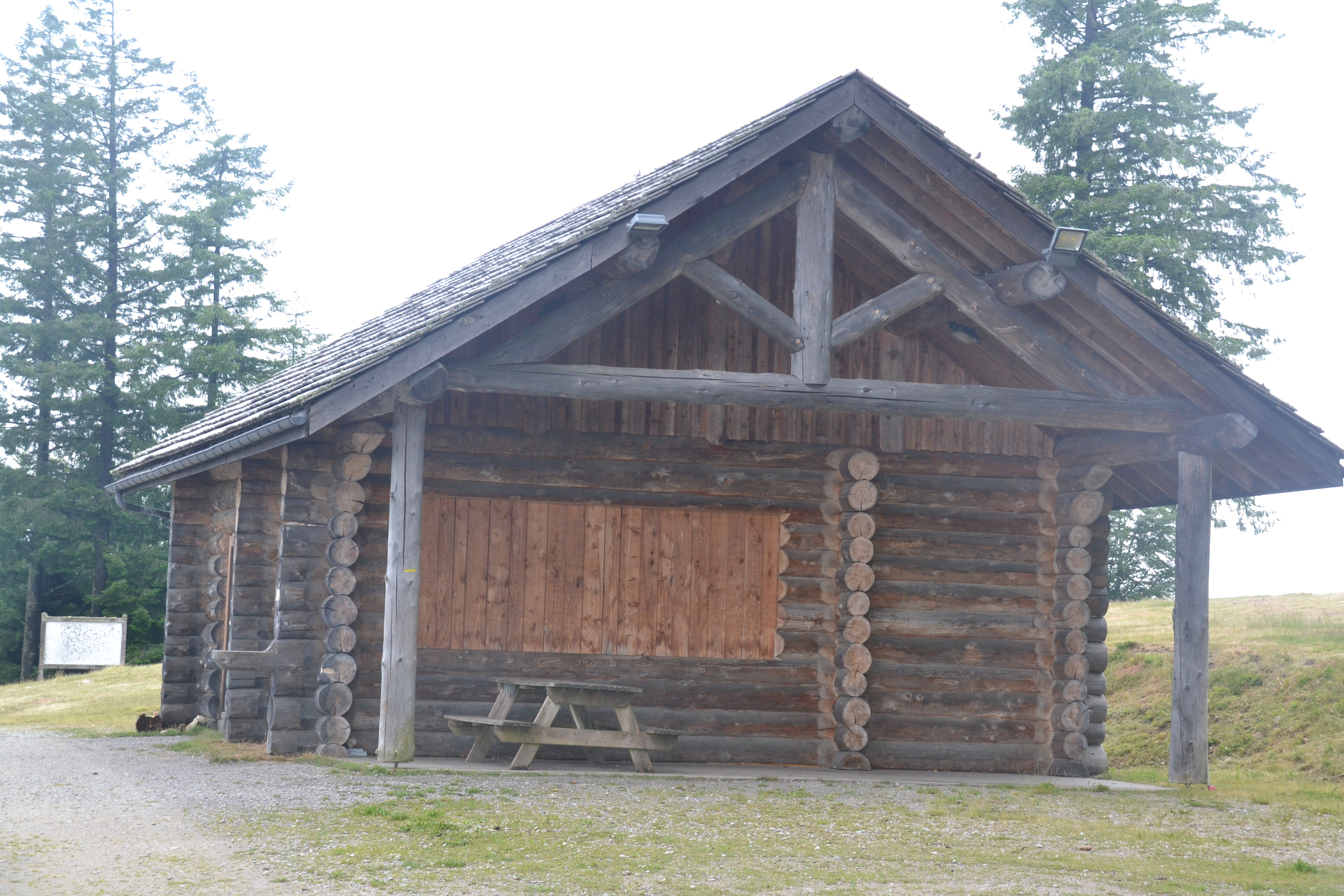
The log-cabin of Mont Bessou.
