= Millevaches =

- Commune
- Coat of arms
- Location of Millevaches
- Location within France Location within Nouvelle-Aquitaine
- Coordinates: 45°38′32″N 2°05′46″E
- Country: France
- Region: Nouvelle-Aquitaine
- Department: Corrèze
- Arrondissement: Ussel
- Canton: Plateau de Millevaches
- Intercommunality: Haute-Corrèze Communauté

Government
  - Mayor (2020–2026): Sylvie Prabonneau
- Area^{1}: 11.54 km^{2} (4.46 sq mi)
- Highest elevation: 956 m (3,136 ft)
- Lowest elevation: 800 m (2,600 ft)
- Population (2023): 79
  - Density: 6.8/km^{2} (18/sq mi)
- Time zone: UTC+01:00 (CET)
  - Summer (DST): UTC+02:00 (CEST)
- INSEE/Postal code: 19139 /19290
- ^{1} French Land Register data, which excludes lakes, ponds, glaciers > 1 km^{2} (0.386 sq mi or 247 acres) and river estuaries.

Millevaches (French pronunciation: [milvaʃ]; Occitan: Miuvachas) is a commune in the Corrèze department in central France in the Nouvelle-Aquitaine region.

== Toponymy ==
The commune, although one of the least populated in the area, gave its name to the Millevaches plateau. This name is attested in the following forms: Millevaccas in 1048, from Mille Vaccis around 1315, Miauvatsas in the 17th-centuary. The legend confirms the obviate meaning of " thousand cows ", " immense pasture ", while Albert Dauzat proposed a Gallo-Latin hybrid *melo vacua "abandoned mountain", which Marcel Villoutreix does not consider impossible.

Its name is Miuvachas in Auvergnat and Limousin dialects.

== History ==
In 1048, the Viscount of Aubusson ceded the locality of Millevaches to the Abbey of Uzerche. The village is mentioned in the cartulary of this abbey in 1145 and 1146 in the latinised form Millevacas. Most of the village was destroyed by a fire in 1871. On 4 September 1871, the fire, which was believed to have been caused by a peat bog fire, destroyed the church and presbytery, and seven to eight houses and barns.

== Geography ==
=== Location ===
The commune located in the Massif Central, part of the Regional Natural Park of the Millevaches in Limousin. The village of Millevaches is distinguished by at least two characteristics. The first is that it is the highest commune of the whole Limousin, perched between 890 and 920 meters above sea level. The second is that it is located on the dividing watershed between the tributaries of the Loire and those of the Dordogne. To the north, it is Vienne which takes its source about 4 km from the village, to the south, the Vézère, the Luzège and the Triouzoune are just three to five kilometres away.

=== Population ===
Historical population
Year	Pop.	±% p.a.
1968	113	—
1975	86	−3.83%
1982	79	−1.21%
1990	76	−0.48%
1999	82	+0.85%
2007	90	+1.17%
2012	82	−1.84%
2017	81	−0.25%
2023	79	−0.42%
Source: INSEE

== Culture and heritage ==
=== Places and monuments ===
- Church Sainte-Madeleine de Millevaches - Current church was rebuilt between 1871 and 1874 after a fire in 1871 destroyed the previous church. The vault of the nave collapsed in 1978 and was rebuilt. Listed in the General Inventory of Cultural Heritage.
- War memorial.
- House of the Parc Naturel Régional de Millevaches en Limousin.
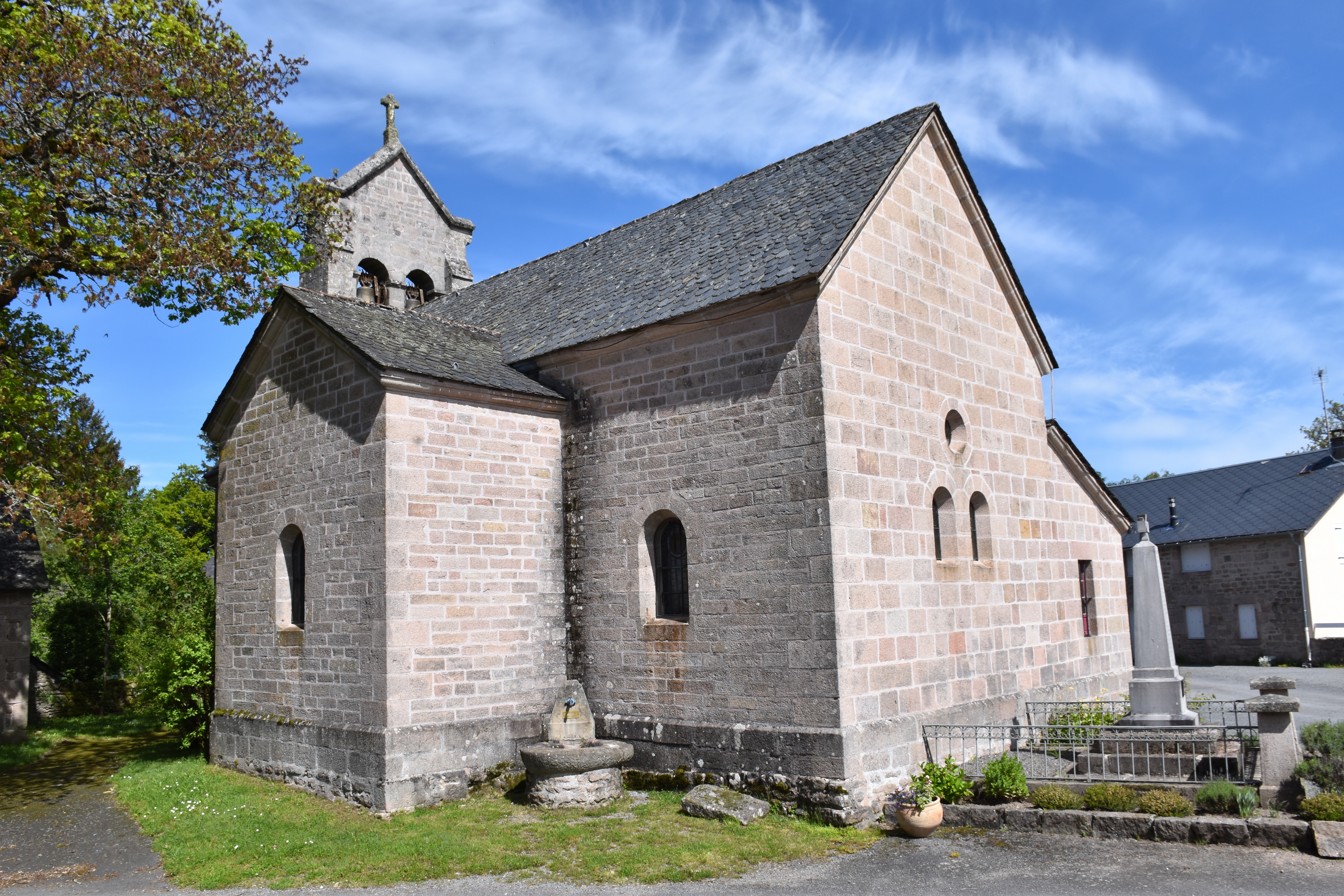
View of the apse.

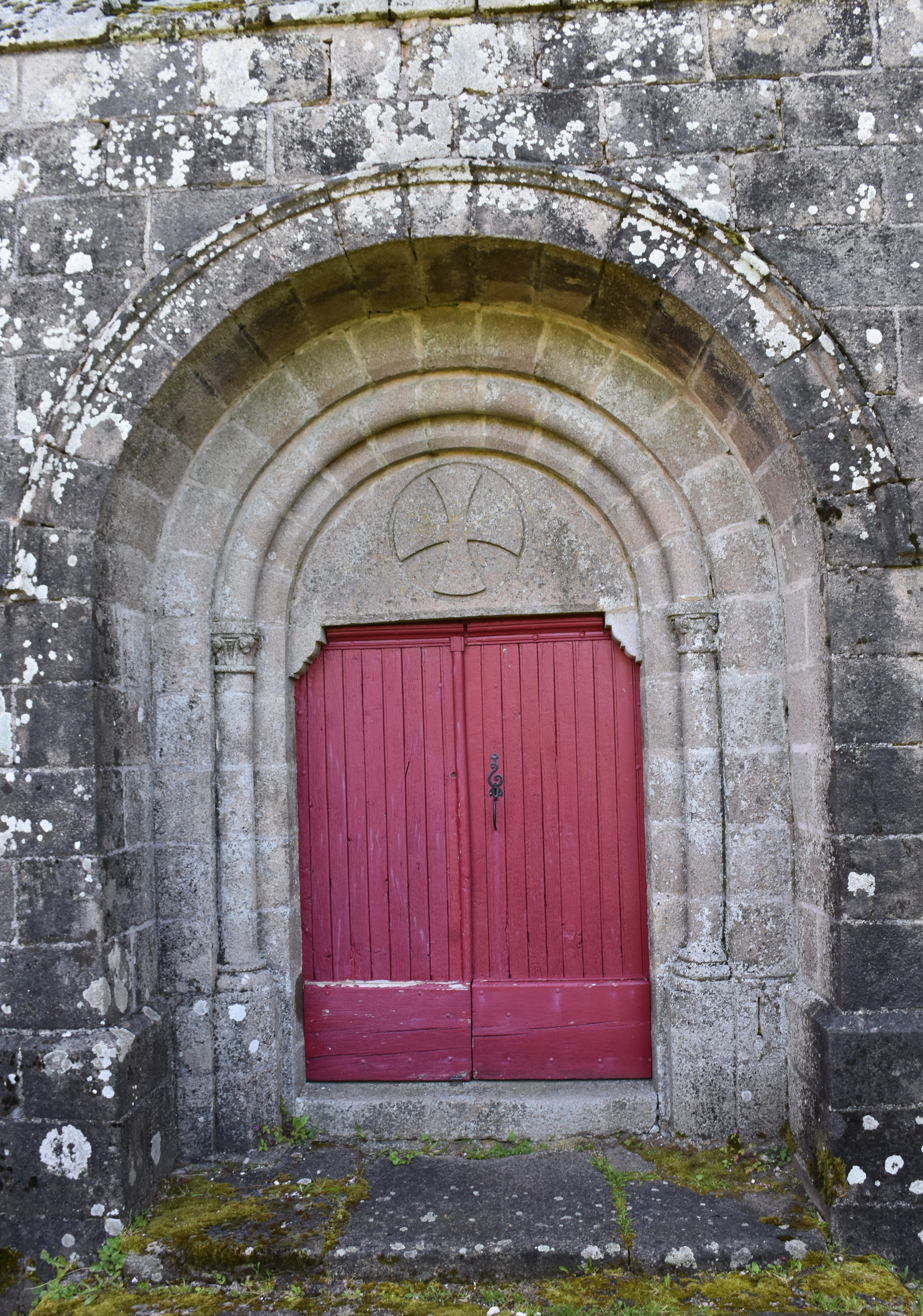
The Romanesque portal surmounted by a Maltese cross.

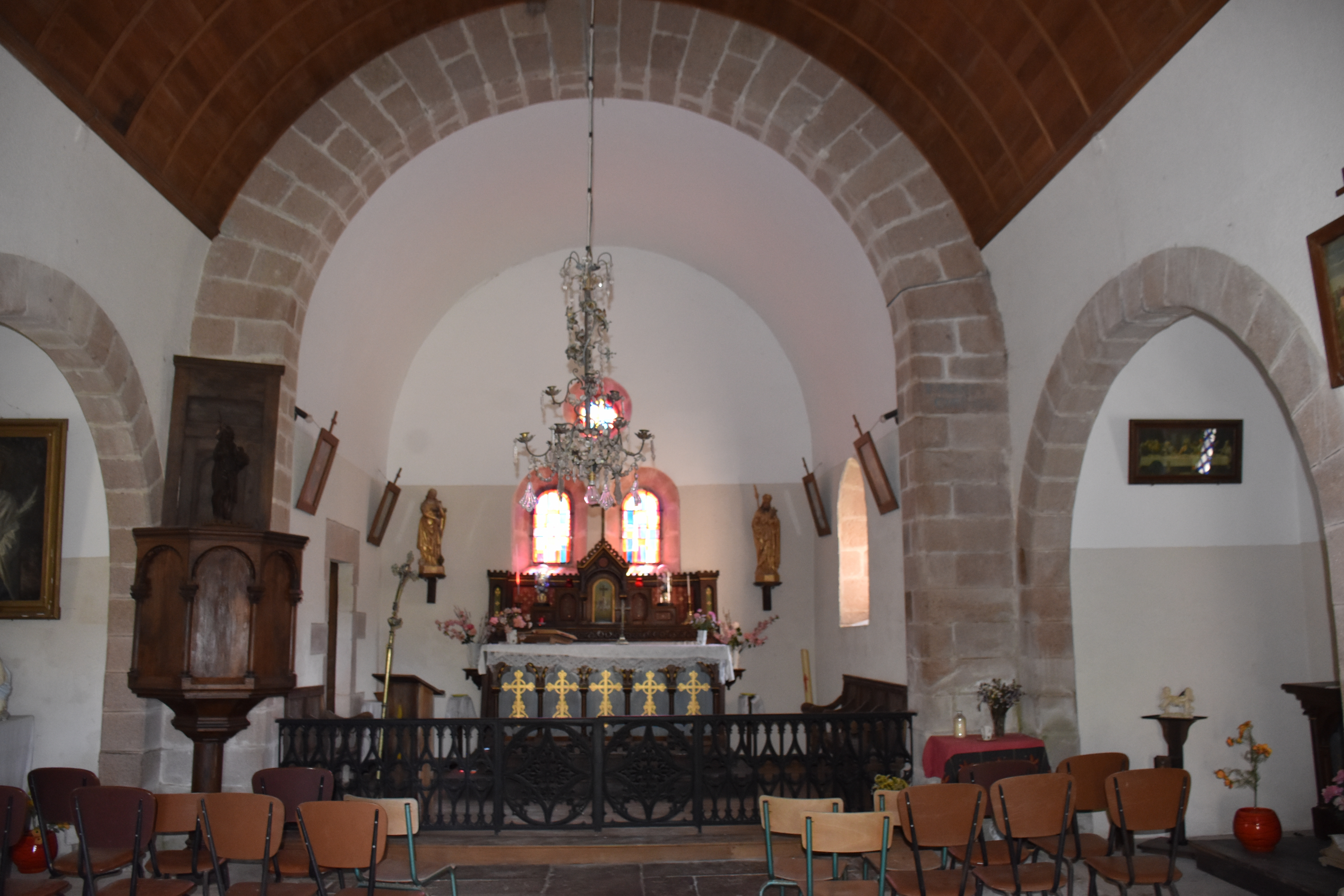
The nave.

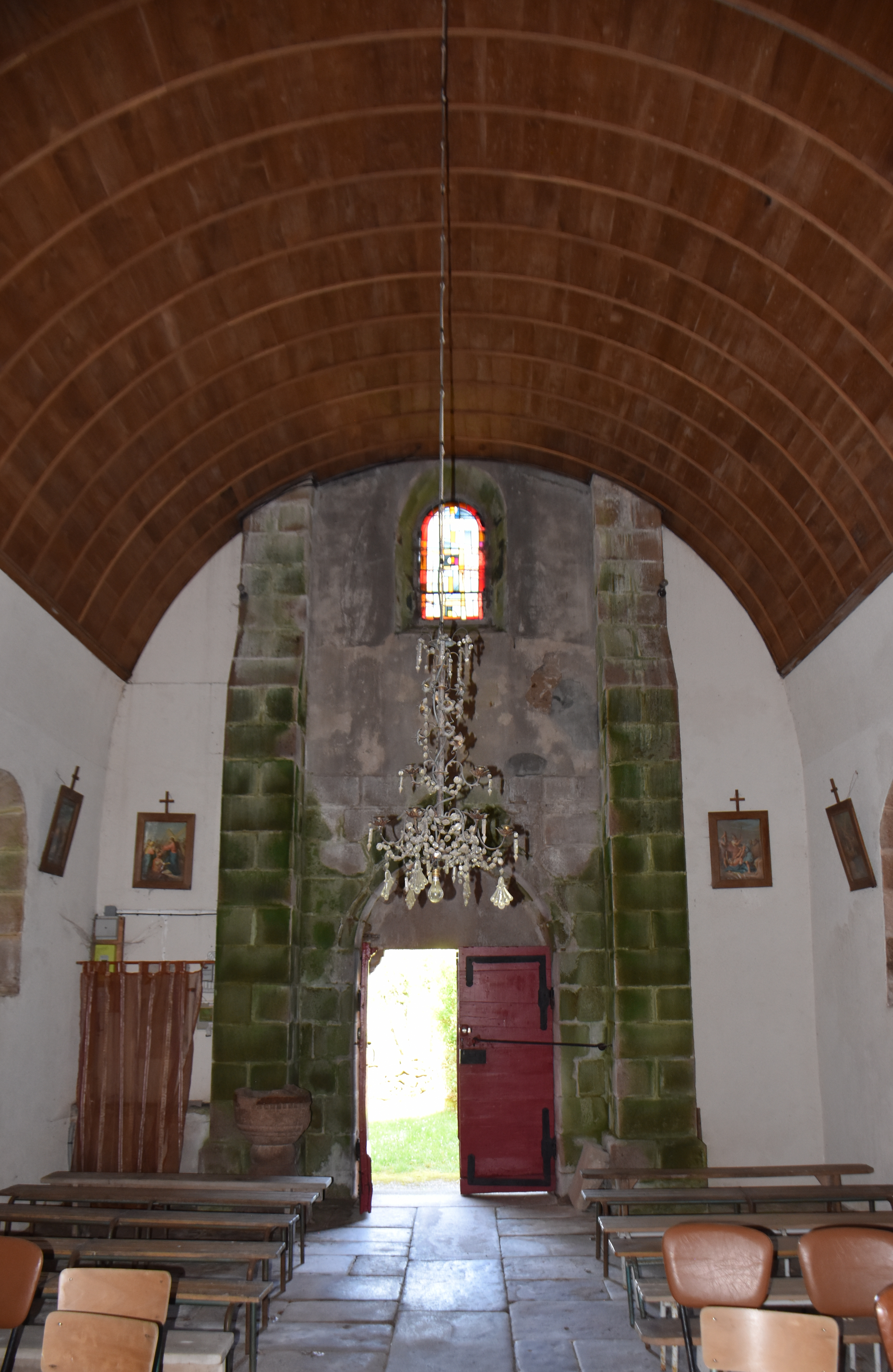
The nave on the porch side.

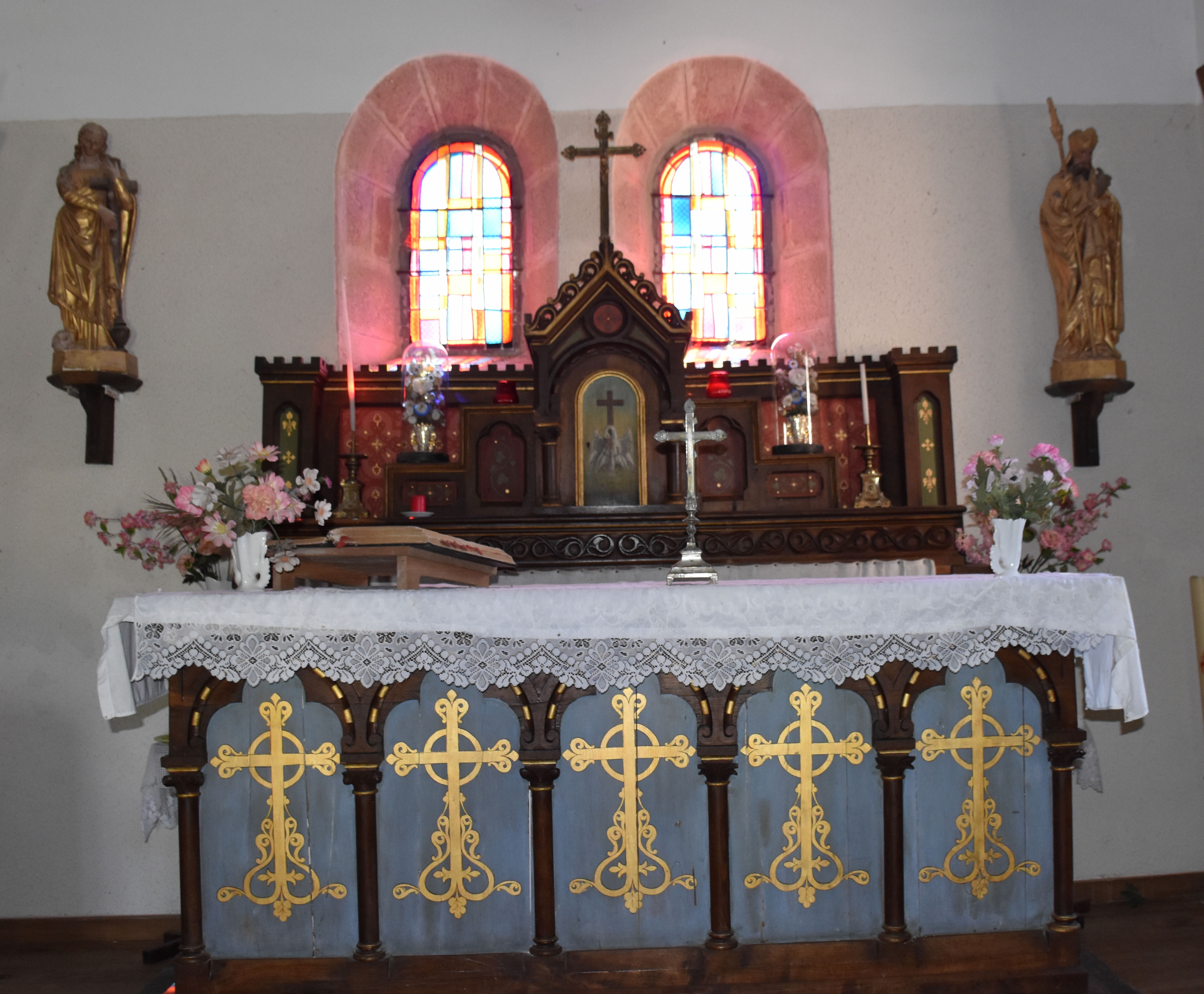
The high altar

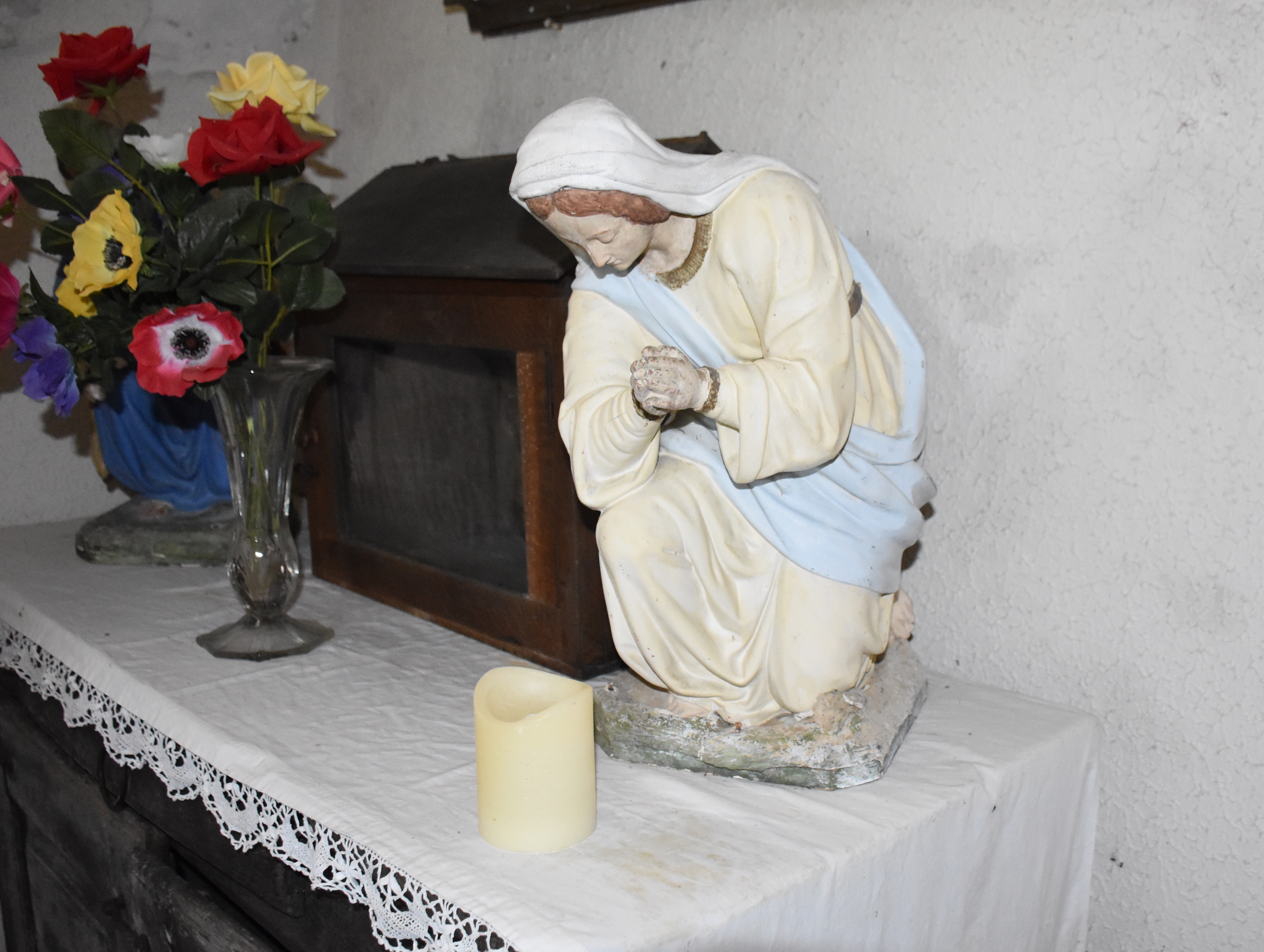
Virgin Praying.

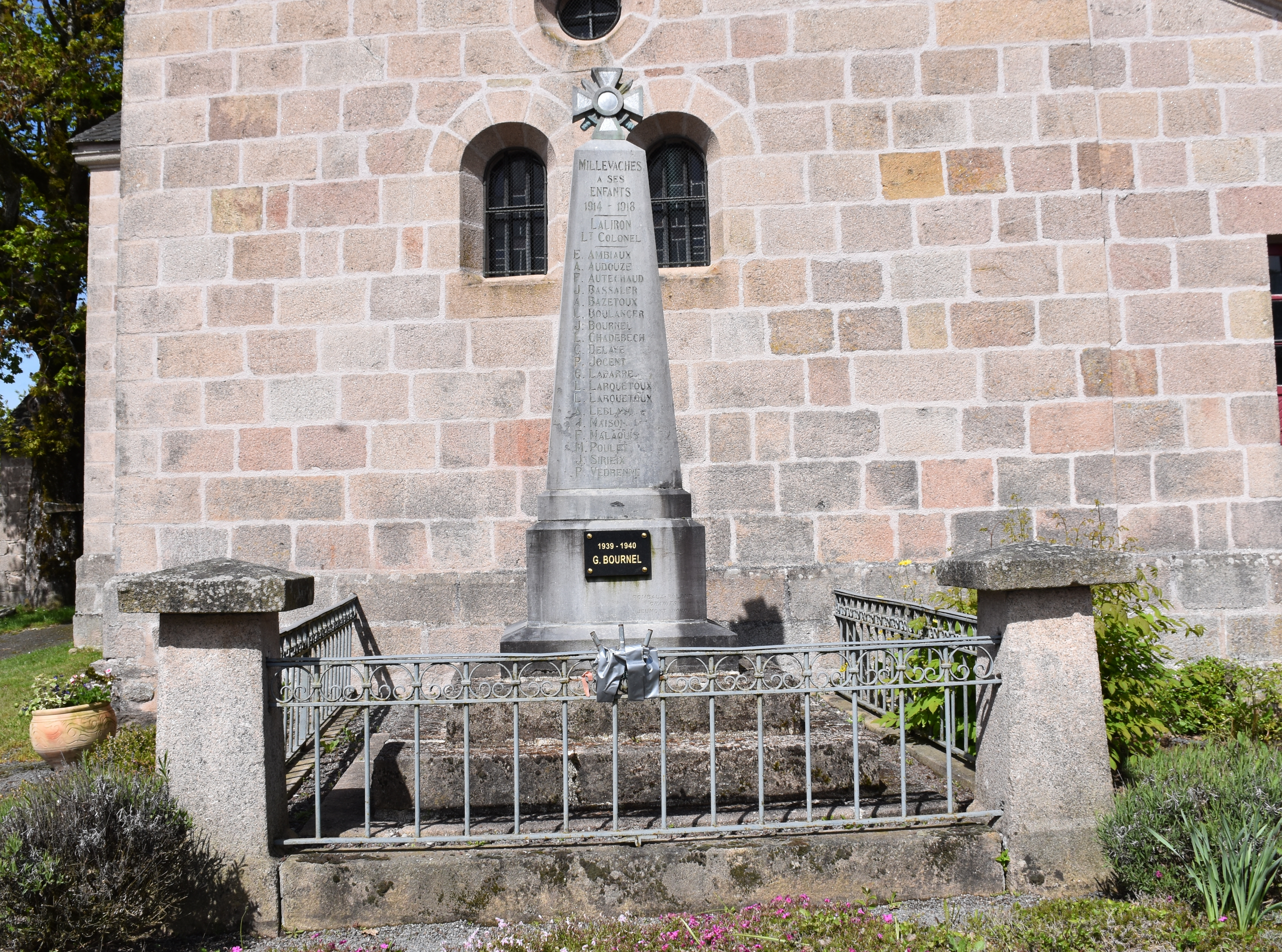
The war memorial.

== See also ==
- Communes of the Corrèze department
