= Communauté de communes Aubusson-Felletin =

Coordinates: 45.9537°N 2.1661°E

Aubusson-Felletin
- Former communauté de communes
- Interactive map of Aubusson-Felletin
- Country: France
- Region: Nouvelle-Aquitaine
- Department: Creuse
- No. of communes: {{{nbcomm}}}
- Established: 2001
- Disbanded: 2014
- Area: 329.65 km^{2} (127.28 sq mi)
- Population (2010): 11,427
  - Density: 34.664/km^{2} (89.779/sq mi)

The communauté de communes Aubusson-Felletin was located in the Creuse département of the Limousin region of central France. It was created in January 2001. It was merged into the new Communauté de communes Creuse Grand Sud in January 2014.

It comprised the following 18 communes:

- Ars
- Aubusson
- Alleyrat
- Blessac
- Néoux
- Saint-Alpinien
- Saint-Amand
- Saint-Avit-de-Tardes
- Saint-Maixant
- Saint-Marc-à-Frongier
- Saint-Pardoux-le-Neuf
- Felletin
- Moutier-Rozeille
- Sainte-Feyre-la-Montagne
- Saint-Frion
- Saint-Quentin-la-Chabanne
- Vallière
- La Villetelle
