= Canton of Gentioux-Pigerolles =

Coordinates: 45°47′24″N 2°01′04″E

Gentioux-Pigerolles
- Former canton
- Interactive map of Gentioux-Pigerolles
- Country: France
- Region: Nouvelle-Aquitaine
- Department: Creuse
- No. of communes: {{{nbcomm}}}
- Disbanded: 2015
- Area: 251.10 km^{2} (96.95 sq mi)
- Population (2012): 1,458
  - Density: 5.806/km^{2} (15.04/sq mi)

The Canton of Gentioux-Pigerolles is a former canton situated in the Creuse département and in the Limousin region of central France. It was disbanded following the French canton reorganisation which came into effect in March 2015. It consisted of seven communes, which joined the canton of Felletin in 2015. It had 1,458 inhabitants (2012).

== Geography ==
An area of farming, forestry and quarrying, with the town of Gentioux-Pigerolles, in the arrondissement of Aubusson, at its centre. The altitude varies from 525m (Faux-la-Montagne) to 929m (Gentioux-Pigerolles) with an average altitude of 751m.

The canton comprised 7 communes:

- Faux-la-Montagne
- Féniers
- Gentioux-Pigerolles
- Gioux
- La Nouaille
- Saint-Marc-à-Loubaud
- La Villedieu

== Population ==
Historical population Canton of Gentioux-Pigerolles
Year	1962	1968	1975	1982	1990	1999
Pop.	1,811	2,207	1,782	1,578	1,485	1,487
±%	—	+21.9%	−19.3%	−11.4%	−5.9%	+0.1%
From the year 1962 on: No double counting – residents of multiple communes (e.g. students and military personnel) are counted only once. Source: INSEE

== See also ==
- Arrondissements of the Creuse department
- Cantons of the Creuse department
- Communes of the Creuse department
