= Communauté de communes du Plateau de Gentioux =

Coordinates: 45.7842°N 1.9949°E

Plateau de Gentioux
- Former communauté de communes
- Interactive map of Plateau de Gentioux
- Country: France
- Region: Nouvelle-Aquitaine
- Department: Corrèze, Creuse
- No. of communes: {{{nbcomm}}}
- Established: 1993
- Disbanded: 2014
- Area: 282.82 km^{2} (109.20 sq mi)
- Population (1999): 2,259
  - Density: 7.987/km^{2} (20.69/sq mi)

The communauté de communes du Plateau de Gentioux was created on December 15, 1992 and is located in the Creuse and Corrèze departements of the Limousin region of central France. It was created in January 1993. It was merged into the new Communauté de communes Creuse Grand Sud in January 2014.

It comprised the following 7 communes:

- Faux-la-Montagne
- Gentioux-Pigerolles
- La Nouaille
- Peyrelevade (in the département of Corrèze)
- Saint-Marc-à-Loubaud
- La Villedieu
- Saint-Yrieix-la-Montagne

== See also ==
- Communes of the Creuse department
