= Poussanges =

Commune in Nouvelle-Aquitaine, France

- Commune
- Location of Poussanges
- Location within France Location within Nouvelle-Aquitaine
- Coordinates: 45°49′36″N 2°12′58″E
- Country: France
- Region: Nouvelle-Aquitaine
- Department: Creuse
- Arrondissement: Aubusson
- Canton: Felletin
- Intercommunality: Haute-Corrèze Communauté

Government
  - Mayor (2020–2026): Marc Bujon
- Area^{1}: 23.35 km^{2} (9.02 sq mi)
- Highest elevation: 861 m (2,825 ft)
- Lowest elevation: 564 m (1,850 ft)
- Population (2023): 148
  - Density: 6.34/km^{2} (16.4/sq mi)
- Time zone: UTC+01:00 (CET)
  - Summer (DST): UTC+02:00 (CEST)
- INSEE/Postal code: 23158 /23500
- ^{1} French Land Register data, which excludes lakes, ponds, glaciers > 1 km^{2} (0.386 sq mi or 247 acres) and river estuaries.

Poussanges (French pronunciation: [pusɑ̃ʒ]; Occitan: Possanjas) is a commune in the Creuse department in the Nouvelle-Aquitaine region in central France.

== Geography ==
An area of farming and forestry, lakes and streams comprising the village and a few hamlets situated by the banks of the river Déjoune, some 11 miles (18 km) south of Aubusson, at the junction of the D35 and the D93 roads. The commune is within the natural park of the ‘Millevaches’ (1000 lakes, not cows).

== Population ==
Historical population
Year	Pop.	±% p.a.
1968	218	—
1975	207	−0.74%
1982	192	−1.07%
1990	196	+0.26%
1999	170	−1.57%
2007	144	−2.05%
2012	141	−0.42%
2017	155	+1.91%
2023	148	−0.77%
Source: INSEE

== Sights ==
- The church, dating from the fourteenth century.
- The ruins of the château de Ribeyreix.

== See also ==
- Communes of the Creuse department
