= Mautes =

Commune in Nouvelle-Aquitaine, France

- Commune
- Location of Mautes
- Location within France Location within Nouvelle-Aquitaine
- Coordinates: 45°56′41″N 2°23′07″E
- Country: France
- Region: Nouvelle-Aquitaine
- Department: Creuse
- Arrondissement: Aubusson
- Canton: Aubusson
- Intercommunality: CC Marche et Combraille en Aquitaine

Government
  - Mayor (2020–2026): Yolande Plas
- Area^{1}: 22.67 km^{2} (8.75 sq mi)
- Elevation: 651 m (2,136 ft)
- Highest elevation: 727 m (2,385 ft)
- Lowest elevation: 568 m (1,864 ft)
- Population (2023): 194
  - Density: 8.56/km^{2} (22.2/sq mi)
- Time zone: UTC+01:00 (CET)
  - Summer (DST): UTC+02:00 (CEST)
- INSEE/Postal code: 23127 /23190
- ^{1} French Land Register data, which excludes lakes, ponds, glaciers > 1 km^{2} (0.386 sq mi or 247 acres) and river estuaries.

Mautes (French pronunciation: [mot]; Occitan: Mautas) is a commune in the Creuse department in the Nouvelle-Aquitaine region in central France.

== Geography ==
A farming area comprising a small village and several hamlets, situated by the banks of the Roudeau river, some 12 miles (19 km) east of Aubusson, at the junction of the D39, D995 and the D25 roads.

== Population ==
Historical population
Year	Pop.	±% p.a.
1968	370	—
1975	313	−2.36%
1982	298	−0.70%
1990	262	−1.60%
1999	220	−1.92%
2007	213	−0.40%
2012	227	+1.28%
2017	210	−1.54%
2023	194	−1.31%
Source: INSEE

== Sights ==
- The church, dating from the thirteenth century.
- The feudal castles at Barmont and Puy-de-Barmont.
- Traces of Roman villas.
- A menhir.
- Canto le chien fantastique.

== See also ==
- Communes of the Creuse department
