= Mainsat =

Commune in Nouvelle-Aquitaine, France

- Commune
- Location of Mainsat
- Location within France Location within Nouvelle-Aquitaine
- Coordinates: 46°03′12″N 2°23′15″E
- Country: France
- Region: Nouvelle-Aquitaine
- Department: Creuse
- Arrondissement: Aubusson
- Canton: Aubusson
- Intercommunality: CC Marche et Combraille en Aquitaine

Government
  - Mayor (2020–2026): David Schmidt
- Area^{1}: 34.81 km^{2} (13.44 sq mi)
- Elevation: 610 m (2,000 ft)
- Highest elevation: 670 m (2,200 ft)
- Lowest elevation: 478 m (1,568 ft)
- Population (2023): 540
  - Density: 16/km^{2} (40/sq mi)
- Time zone: UTC+01:00 (CET)
  - Summer (DST): UTC+02:00 (CEST)
- INSEE/Postal code: 23116 /23700
- ^{1} French Land Register data, which excludes lakes, ponds, glaciers > 1 km^{2} (0.386 sq mi or 247 acres) and river estuaries.

Mainsat (French pronunciation: [mɛ̃sa]; Occitan: Mançac) is a commune in the Creuse department in the Nouvelle-Aquitaine region in central France.

== Geography ==
An area of farming and forestry, lakes and streams, comprising the village and several hamlets situated some 12 miles (19 km) northeast of Aubusson, at the junction of the D4, D19 and the D38 roads.

== Population ==
Historical population
Year	Pop.	±% p.a.
1968	820	—
1975	743	−1.40%
1982	752	+0.17%
1990	748	−0.07%
1999	682	−1.02%
2007	636	−0.87%
2012	599	−1.19%
2017	564	−1.20%
2023	540	−0.72%
Source: INSEE

== Sights ==
- The church, dating from the nineteenth century.
- The fifteenth-century château.
- A dolmen at Pellevoisin.
- The remains of several Roman villas.
- The Château des Portes.
- Vestiges of a château at Montgrenier.

== See also ==
- Communes of the Creuse department
