= Néoux =

Commune in Nouvelle-Aquitaine, France

- Commune
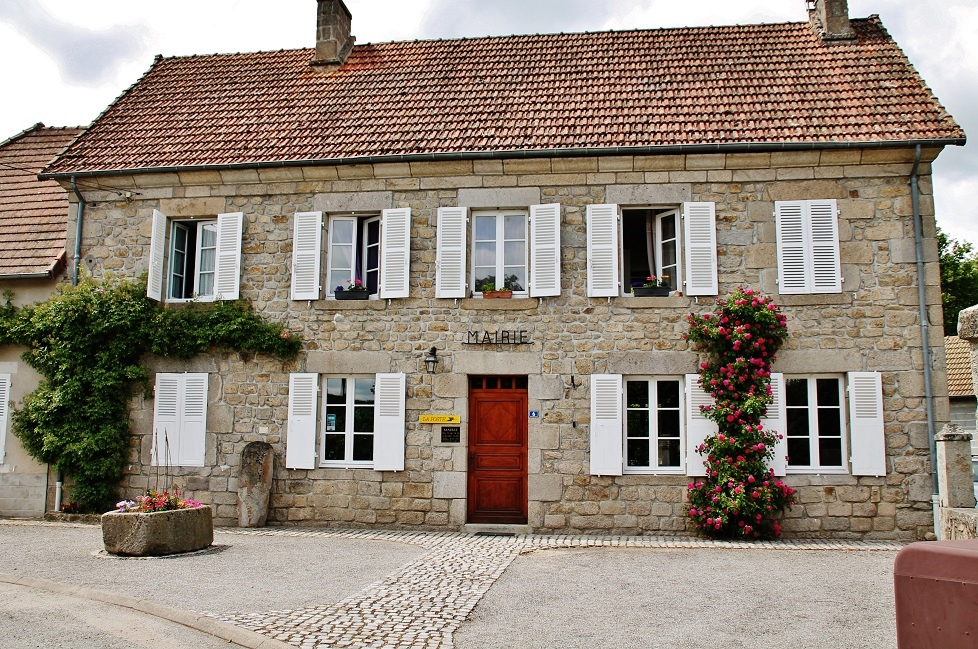
- Town hall
- Location of Néoux
- Location within France Location within Nouvelle-Aquitaine
- Coordinates: 45°54′56″N 2°15′41″E
- Country: France
- Region: Nouvelle-Aquitaine
- Department: Creuse
- Arrondissement: Aubusson
- Canton: Aubusson
- Intercommunality: CC Creuse Grand Sud

Government
  - Mayor (2020–2026): Pascal Merigot
- Area^{1}: 23.81 km^{2} (9.19 sq mi)
- Elevation: 556 m (1,824 ft)
- Highest elevation: 688 m (2,257 ft)
- Lowest elevation: 509 m (1,670 ft)
- Population (2023): 279
  - Density: 11.7/km^{2} (30.3/sq mi)
- Time zone: UTC+01:00 (CET)
  - Summer (DST): UTC+02:00 (CEST)
- INSEE/Postal code: 23142 /23200
- ^{1} French Land Register data, which excludes lakes, ponds, glaciers > 1 km^{2} (0.386 sq mi or 247 acres) and river estuaries.

Néoux (French pronunciation: [neu]; Occitan: Neon) is a commune in the Creuse department in the Nouvelle-Aquitaine region in central France.

== Geography ==
An area of farming and forestry, lakes and streams comprising the village and a few hamlets situated by the banks of the small river Rozeille, just 4 miles (6.4 km) southeast of Aubusson, at the junction of the D38, D40 and the D80 roads.

== Population ==
Historical population
Year	Pop.	±% p.a.
1968	461	—
1975	373	−2.98%
1982	339	−1.36%
1990	295	−1.72%
1999	300	+0.19%
2007	301	+0.04%
2012	296	−0.33%
2017	287	−0.62%
2023	279	−0.47%
Source: INSEE

== Climate ==
It is classified under the Cfb category of the Köppen‑Geiger climate classification (oceanic climate, mild summers, no dry season).

In January (the coldest month), the average maximum temperature is around 4.9 °C, and the minimum around ‑0.2 °C, In August (the warmest month), the average maximum temperature reaches approximately 24.6 °C.

The annual average precipitation is about 694 mm, occurring over roughly 188.6 days per year.

Snowfall occurs during the cold months (January, February, March, and October–December) and occasionally accumulates, but it is not as heavy as in higher mountainous areas.

The driest month is typically February, while June tends to experience higher rainfall.

== Sights ==
- The church, dating from the late thirteenth century.

== See also ==
- Communes of the Creuse department
