= Moutier-Rozeille =

Commune in Nouvelle-Aquitaine, France

- Commune
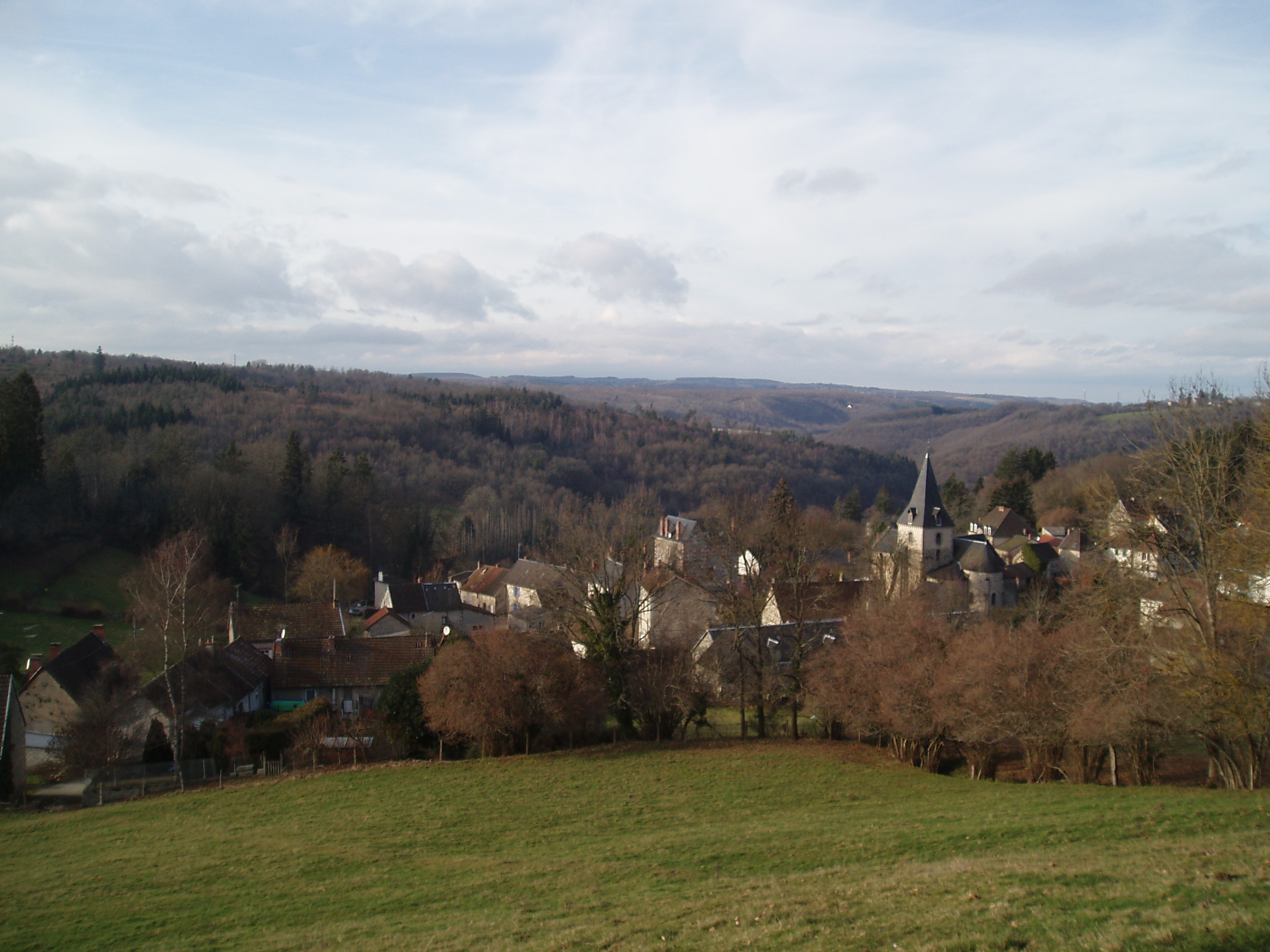
- A general view of Moutier-Rozeille

- Coat of arms
- Location of Moutier-Rozeille
- Location within France Location within Nouvelle-Aquitaine
- Coordinates: 45°55′03″N 2°11′52″E
- Country: France
- Region: Nouvelle-Aquitaine
- Department: Creuse
- Arrondissement: Aubusson
- Canton: Felletin
- Intercommunality: CC Creuse Grand Sud

Government
  - Mayor (2020–2026): Jean-Paul Burjade
- Area^{1}: 19.66 km^{2} (7.59 sq mi)
- Elevation: 538 m (1,765 ft)
- Highest elevation: 671 m (2,201 ft)
- Lowest elevation: 437 m (1,434 ft)
- Population (2023): 432
  - Density: 22.0/km^{2} (56.9/sq mi)
- Time zone: UTC+01:00 (CET)
  - Summer (DST): UTC+02:00 (CEST)
- INSEE/Postal code: 23140 /23200
- ^{1} French Land Register data, which excludes lakes, ponds, glaciers > 1 km^{2} (0.386 sq mi or 247 acres) and river estuaries.

Moutier-Rozeille (French pronunciation: [mutje ʁozɛj]; Occitan: Mostier Roselha) is a commune in the Creuse department in the Nouvelle-Aquitaine region in central France.

== Geography ==
An area of farming and forestry comprising a village and several hamlets situated near where the Creuse joins the Rozeille river, just 3 miles (4.8 km) south of Aubusson, at the junction of the D19, D982 and the D21 roads.

== Population ==
Historical population
Year	Pop.	±% p.a.
1968	507	—
1975	493	−0.40%
1982	475	−0.53%
1990	446	−0.78%
1999	435	−0.28%
2007	439	+0.11%
2012	436	−0.14%
2017	427	−0.42%
2023	432	+0.19%
Source: INSEE

== Sights ==
- The church, dating from the eleventh century.
- The ruins of a feudal castle at Confolent.
- The ruins of the St Hilaire church. Originally built in the mid-7th century around a Gallo-Roman mausoleum, the church has been continuously occupied until the end of the 19th century. With many graves and architectural features, the site is regularly studied by archaeologists since 2007.

== See also ==
- Communes of the Creuse department
