= Vallière =

Commune in Nouvelle-Aquitaine, France

- Commune
- Location of Vallière
- Location within France Location within Nouvelle-Aquitaine
- Coordinates: 45°54′24″N 2°02′05″E
- Country: France
- Region: Nouvelle-Aquitaine
- Department: Creuse
- Arrondissement: Aubusson
- Canton: Felletin
- Intercommunality: CC Creuse Grand Sud

Government
  - Mayor (2020–2026): Valérie Bertin
- Area^{1}: 48.42 km^{2} (18.70 sq mi)
- Highest elevation: 708 m (2,323 ft)
- Lowest elevation: 494 m (1,621 ft)
- Population (2023): 705
  - Density: 14.6/km^{2} (37.7/sq mi)
- Time zone: UTC+01:00 (CET)
  - Summer (DST): UTC+02:00 (CEST)
- INSEE/Postal code: 23257 /23120
- ^{1} French Land Register data, which excludes lakes, ponds, glaciers > 1 km^{2} (0.386 sq mi or 247 acres) and river estuaries.

Vallière (French pronunciation: [valjɛʁ]; Occitan: Valièra, before 1996: Vallières) is a commune in the Creuse department in the Nouvelle-Aquitaine region in central France.

== Geography ==
A farming area comprising the village and several hamlets situated by the banks of the river Banize, some 10 miles (16 km) southwest of Aubusson, at the junction of the D7, D10, D16 and the D36 roads. The commune lies within the natural park of the ‘Millevaches’ (1000 lakes, not cows).

== Population ==
Historical population
Year	Pop.	±% p.a.
1968	994	—
1975	940	−0.79%
1982	885	−0.86%
1990	814	−1.04%
1999	774	−0.56%
2007	756	−0.29%
2012	767	+0.29%
2017	723	−1.17%
2023	705	−0.42%
Source: INSEE

== Sights ==
- The church of St. Martin, dating from the thirteenth century.
- The fourteenth-century château de Villeneuve.
- Two menhirs, at Fraisse and Les Garennes.

== See also ==
- Communes of the Creuse department
