= Blessac =

Commune in Nouvelle-Aquitaine, France

- Commune
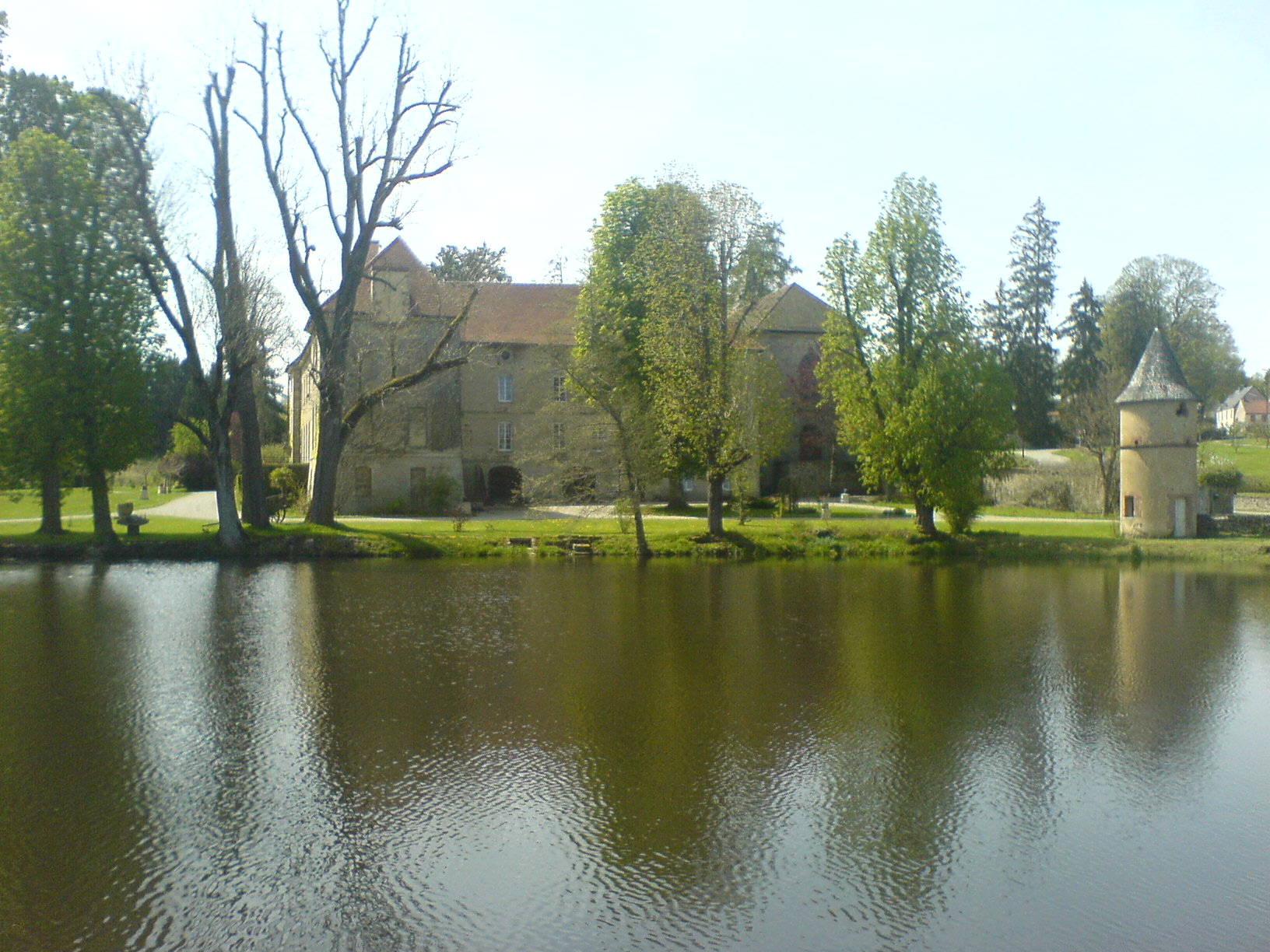
- Chateau

- Coat of arms
- Location of Blessac
- Location within France Location within Nouvelle-Aquitaine
- Coordinates: 45°57′34″N 2°07′39″E
- Country: France
- Region: Nouvelle-Aquitaine
- Department: Creuse
- Arrondissement: Aubusson
- Canton: Aubusson
- Intercommunality: CC Creuse Grand Sud

Government
  - Mayor (2024–2026): Alexis Tourade
- Area^{1}: 17.75 km^{2} (6.85 sq mi)
- Elevation: 550 m (1,800 ft)
- Highest elevation: 665 m (2,182 ft)
- Lowest elevation: 406 m (1,332 ft)
- Population (2023): 525
  - Density: 29.6/km^{2} (76.6/sq mi)
- Time zone: UTC+01:00 (CET)
  - Summer (DST): UTC+02:00 (CEST)
- INSEE/Postal code: 23024 /23200
- ^{1} French Land Register data, which excludes lakes, ponds, glaciers > 1 km^{2} (0.386 sq mi or 247 acres) and river estuaries.

Blessac (French pronunciation: [blɛsak]; Occitan: Blaçac) is a commune in the Creuse department in the Nouvelle-Aquitaine region in central France.

== Geography ==
An area of lakes, forestry and farming comprising the village and some hamlets situated just 4 miles (6.4 km) west of Aubusson, in the Creuse valley and at the junction of the D17, D7 and the D941 roads.

== Population ==
Historical population
Year	Pop.	±% p.a.
1968	316	—
1975	342	+1.14%
1982	411	+2.66%
1990	495	+2.35%
1999	488	−0.16%
2007	518	+0.75%
2012	526	+0.31%
2017	533	+0.26%
2023	525	−0.25%
Source: INSEE

== Sights ==
- The church, dating from the twelfth century.
- A dolmen known as Pierre-la-Fade.
- A seventeenth century chateau.
- The chapel of Notre-Dame, dating from the thirteenth century.

== See also ==
- Communes of the Creuse department
