= Saint-Sulpice-les-Champs =

Commune in Nouvelle-Aquitaine, France

- Commune
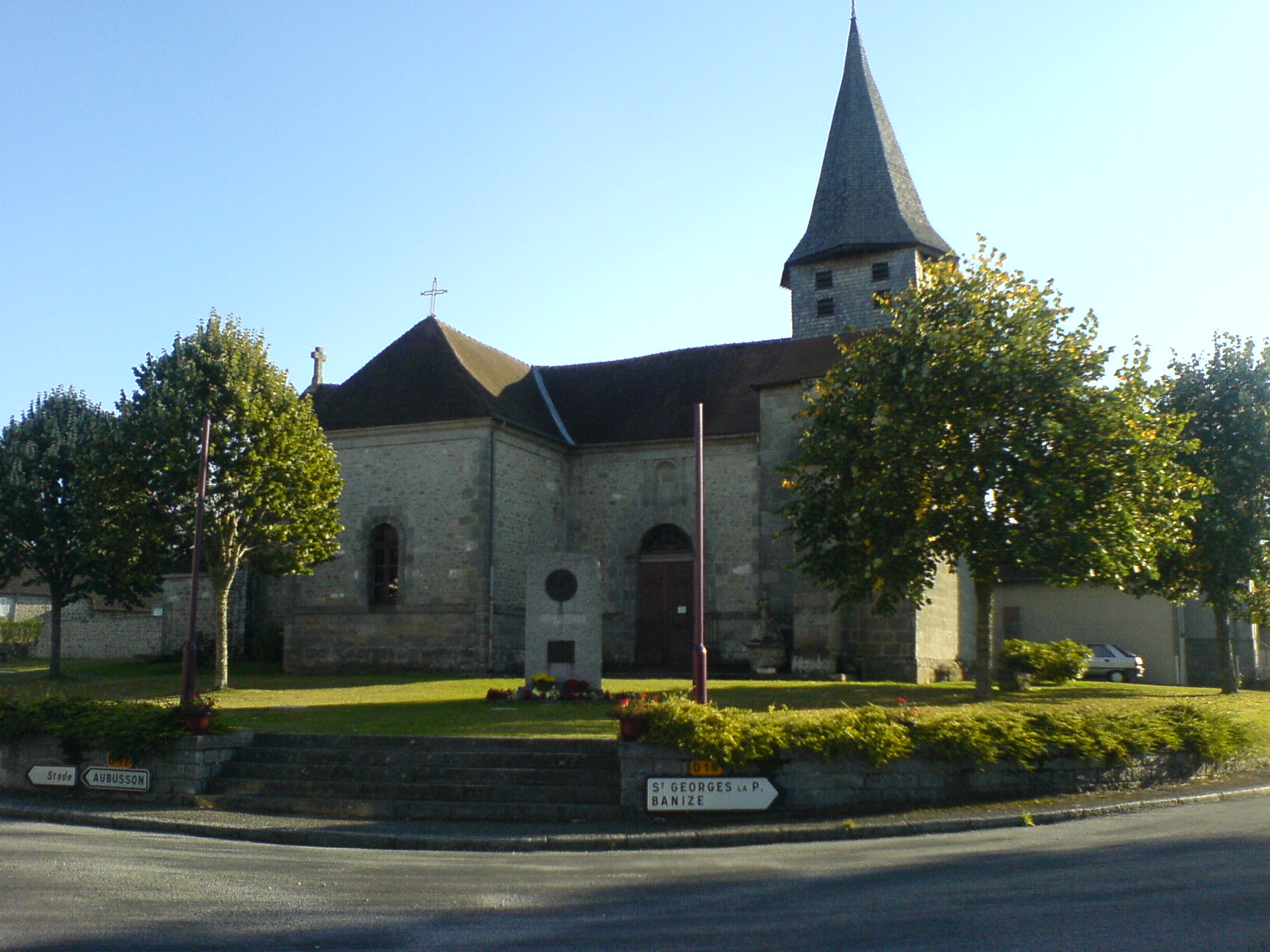
- The church in Saint-Sulpice-les-Champs

- Coat of arms
- Location of Saint-Sulpice-les-Champs
- Location within France Location within Nouvelle-Aquitaine
- Coordinates: 45°59′47″N 2°01′21″E
- Country: France
- Region: Nouvelle-Aquitaine
- Department: Creuse
- Arrondissement: Aubusson
- Canton: Aubusson
- Intercommunality: CC Creuse Grand Sud

Government
  - Mayor (2023–2026): Monique Depeige
- Area^{1}: 21.7 km^{2} (8.4 sq mi)
- Elevation: 612 m (2,008 ft)
- Highest elevation: 651 m (2,136 ft)
- Lowest elevation: 515 m (1,690 ft)
- Population (2023): 340
  - Density: 16/km^{2} (41/sq mi)
- Time zone: UTC+01:00 (CET)
  - Summer (DST): UTC+02:00 (CEST)
- INSEE/Postal code: 23246 /23480
- ^{1} French Land Register data, which excludes lakes, ponds, glaciers > 1 km^{2} (0.386 sq mi or 247 acres) and river estuaries.

Saint-Sulpice-les-Champs (French pronunciation: [sɛ̃ sylpis le ʃɑ̃]; Occitan: Sent Soupise las Chams) is a commune in the Creuse department in central France.

== Population ==
Historical population
Year	Pop.	±% p.a.
1968	469	—
1975	446	−0.72%
1982	406	−1.33%
1990	395	−0.34%
1999	366	−0.84%
2007	383	+0.57%
2012	386	+0.16%
2017	355	−1.66%
2023	340	−0.72%
Source: INSEE

== See also ==
- Communes of the Creuse department
