= Alleyrat, Creuse =

Commune in Nouvelle-Aquitaine, France

Alleyrat
- Commune
- Location of Alleyrat
- Location within France Location within Nouvelle-Aquitaine
- Coordinates: 45°59′21″N 2°09′16″E
- Country: France
- Region: Nouvelle-Aquitaine
- Department: Creuse
- Arrondissement: Aubusson
- Canton: Aubusson
- Intercommunality: CC Creuse Grand Sud

Government
  - Mayor (2020–2026): Guy Brunet
- Area^{1}: 9.54 km^{2} (3.68 sq mi)
- Elevation: 470 m (1,540 ft)
- Highest elevation: 589 m (1,932 ft)
- Lowest elevation: 396 m (1,299 ft)
- Population (2023): 144
  - Density: 15.1/km^{2} (39.1/sq mi)
- Time zone: UTC+01:00 (CET)
  - Summer (DST): UTC+02:00 (CEST)
- INSEE/Postal code: 23003 /23200
- ^{1} French Land Register data, which excludes lakes, ponds, glaciers > 1 km^{2} (0.386 sq mi or 247 acres) and river estuaries.

Alleyrat (French pronunciation: [alɛʁa]; Occitan: Alairac) is a commune in the Creuse department of the Nouvelle-Aquitaine region in central France. The current mayor is Guy Brunet, in office since 2014 and re-elected in 2020.

== Geography ==
Alleyrat is a farming village, some 5 miles (8.0 km) north of Aubusson, at the junction of the D18 and the D942a roads and by the banks of the Creuse river.

== Population ==
Historical population
Year	Pop.	±% p.a.
1968	205	—
1975	176	−2.16%
1982	174	−0.16%
1990	169	−0.36%
1999	166	−0.20%
2007	152	−1.10%
2012	145	−0.94%
2017	143	−0.28%
2023	144	+0.12%
Source: INSEE

== Sights ==
- A church dating from the 12th century
- The ruins of Laubard castle
- The chapel of St. Madeleine

== See also ==
- Communes of the Creuse department
