= Gioux =

Commune in Nouvelle-Aquitaine, France

- Commune
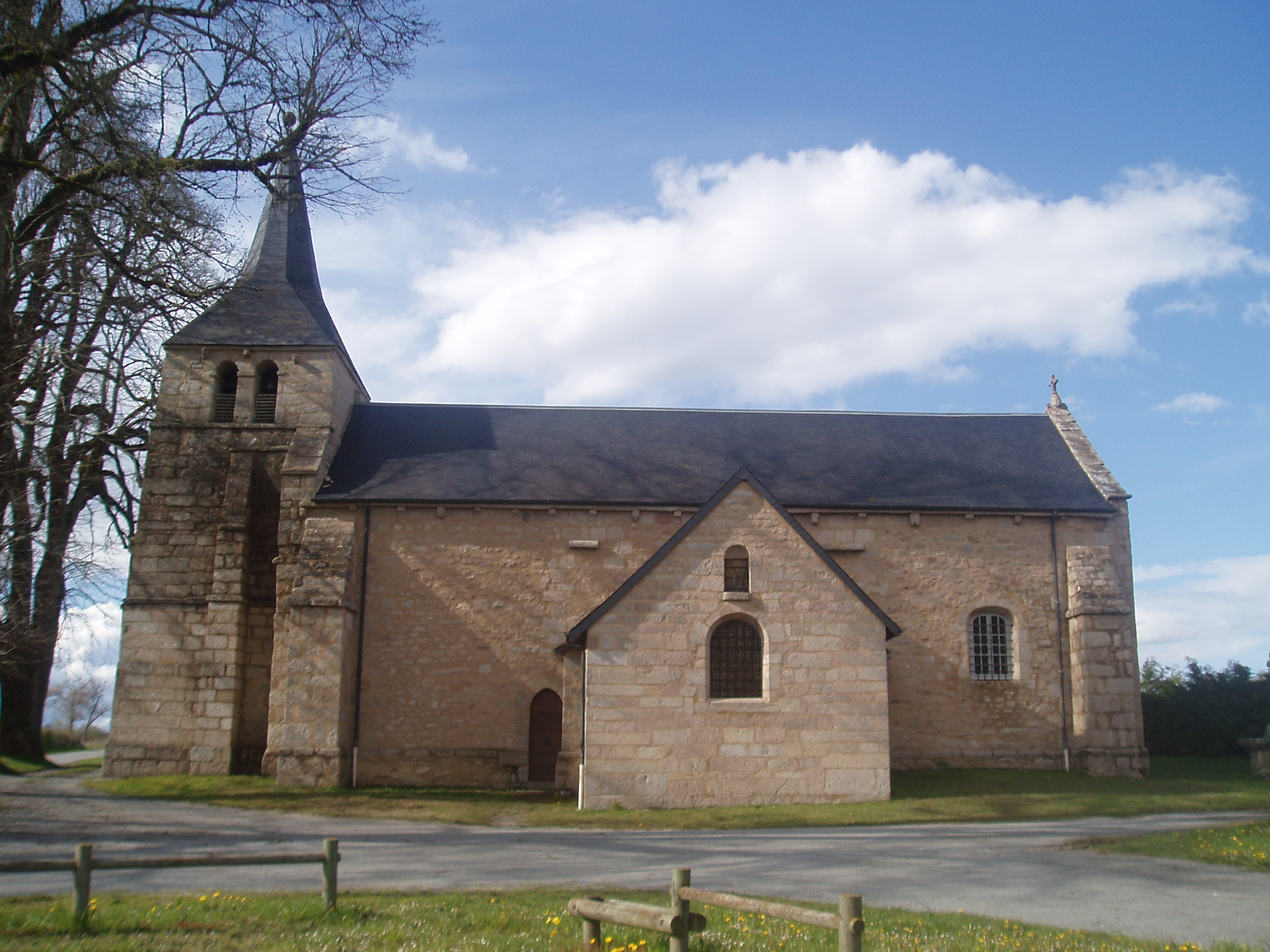
- The church of Saint-Pierre and Saint-Paul, in Gioux
- Location of Gioux
- Location within France Location within Nouvelle-Aquitaine
- Coordinates: 45°48′40″N 2°07′21″E
- Country: France
- Region: Nouvelle-Aquitaine
- Department: Creuse
- Arrondissement: Aubusson
- Canton: Felletin
- Intercommunality: CC Creuse Grand Sud

Government
  - Mayor (2020–2026): Marina Bonifas
- Area^{1}: 37.42 km^{2} (14.45 sq mi)
- Highest elevation: 886 m (2,907 ft)
- Lowest elevation: 608 m (1,995 ft)
- Population (2023): 187
  - Density: 5.00/km^{2} (12.9/sq mi)
- Time zone: UTC+01:00 (CET)
  - Summer (DST): UTC+02:00 (CEST)
- INSEE/Postal code: 23091 /23500
- ^{1} French Land Register data, which excludes lakes, ponds, glaciers > 1 km^{2} (0.386 sq mi or 247 acres) and river estuaries.

Gioux (French pronunciation: [ʒju]; Occitan: Juòus) is a commune in the Creuse department in the Nouvelle-Aquitaine region in central France.

== Geography ==
An area of forestry and farming, comprising the village and several hamlets situated some 10 miles (16 km) south of Aubusson, at the junction of the D35 and the D26 roads. The commune is in the national park of the Millevaches (1000 lakes, not cows).

== Population ==
Historical population
| Year | Pop. | ±% p.a. |
|---|---|---|
| 1968 | 313 | — |
| 1975 | 233 | −4.13% |
| 1982 | 210 | −1.47% |
| 1990 | 214 | +0.24% |
| 1999 | 198 | −0.86% |
| 2007 | 171 | −1.82% |
| 2012 | 179 | +0.92% |
| 2017 | 164 | −1.74% |
| 2023 | 187 | +2.21% |
Source: INSEE

== Sights ==
- The twelfth-century church.
- A menhir known as the Pierre Point.
- A Roman bridge on the way to Feniers.
- Vestiges of a Roman villa at Maisonnières.

== See also ==
- Communes of the Creuse department
