= Communauté de communes Creuse Grand Sud =

Federation of municipalities in France

Creuse Grand Sud
- Communauté de communes
- Interactive map of Creuse Grand Sud
- Coordinates: 45°57′N 02°10′E
- Country: France
- Region: Nouvelle-Aquitaine
- Department: Creuse
- No. of communes: {{{nbcomm}}}
- Established: 2014
- Area: 612.6 km^{2} (236.5 sq mi)
- Population (2018): 11,915
  - Density: 19.45/km^{2} (50.37/sq mi)

The Communauté de communes Creuse Grand Sud is a communauté de communes, an intercommunal structure, in the Creuse department, in the Nouvelle-Aquitaine region, central France. It was created in January 2014 by the merger of the former communautés de communes Aubusson-Felletin and Plateau de Gentioux. Its area is 612.6 km^{2}, and its population was 11,915 in 2018. Its seat is in Aubusson.

== Communes ==
The communauté de communes consists of the following 26 communes:

1. Alleyrat
2. Aubusson
3. Blessac
4. Croze
5. Faux-la-Montagne
6. Felletin
7. Gentioux-Pigerolles
8. Gioux
9. Moutier-Rozeille
10. Néoux
11. La Nouaille
12. Saint-Alpinien
13. Saint-Amand
14. Saint-Avit-de-Tardes
15. Sainte-Feyre-la-Montagne
16. Saint-Frion
17. Saint-Maixant
18. Saint-Marc-à-Frongier
19. Saint-Marc-à-Loubaud
20. Saint-Pardoux-le-Neuf
21. Saint-Quentin-la-Chabanne
22. Saint-Sulpice-les-Champs
23. Saint-Yrieix-la-Montagne
24. Vallière
25. La Villedieu
26. La Villetelle
