= Canton of Aubusson =

Coordinates: 45°59′33″N 2°10′43″E

Aubusson
- Canton
- Interactive map of Aubusson
- Country: France
- Region: Nouvelle-Aquitaine
- Department: Creuse
- No. of communes: {{{nbcomm}}}
- Area: 363.93 km^{2} (140.51 sq mi)
- Population (2023): 8,567
  - Density: 23.54/km^{2} (60.97/sq mi)
- INSEE code: 23 02

The Canton of Aubusson is a canton situated in the Creuse département and in the Nouvelle-Aquitaine region, in central France.

== Geography ==
A farming and woodland area, with the town of Aubusson, in the arrondissement of Aubusson, at its centre. The altitude varies from 396m (Alleyrat) to 715m (Saint-Marc-à-Frongier) with an average altitude of 538m.

== Composition ==
At the French canton reorganisation which came into effect in March 2015, the canton was expanded from 10 to 21 communes:

- Alleyrat
- Aubusson
- Bellegarde-en-Marche
- Blessac
- Bosroger
- Champagnat
- La Chaussade
- Lupersat
- Mainsat
- Mautes
- Néoux
- Saint-Alpinien
- Saint-Amand
- Saint-Avit-de-Tardes
- Saint-Domet
- Saint-Maixant
- Saint-Marc-à-Frongier
- Saint-Pardoux-le-Neuf
- Saint-Silvain-Bellegarde
- Saint-Sulpice-les-Champs
- La Serre-Bussière-Vieille

== Population ==
Historical population
Year	Pop.	±% p.a.
2013	9,528	—
2018	9,109	−0.90%
Source: INSEE

== See also ==
- Arrondissements of the Creuse department
- Cantons of the Creuse department
- Communes of the Creuse department
