= Saint-Domet =

Commune in Nouvelle-Aquitaine, France

- Commune
- Coat of arms
- Location of Saint-Domet
- Location within France Location within Nouvelle-Aquitaine
- Coordinates: 46°02′39″N 2°18′03″E
- Country: France
- Region: Nouvelle-Aquitaine
- Department: Creuse
- Arrondissement: Aubusson
- Canton: Aubusson
- Intercommunality: CC Marche et Combraille en Aquitaine

Government
  - Mayor (2020–2026): Catherine Pinlon
- Area^{1}: 15.33 km^{2} (5.92 sq mi)
- Elevation: 430 m (1,410 ft)
- Highest elevation: 544 m (1,785 ft)
- Lowest elevation: 422 m (1,385 ft)
- Population (2023): 160
  - Density: 10/km^{2} (27/sq mi)
- Time zone: UTC+01:00 (CET)
  - Summer (DST): UTC+02:00 (CEST)
- INSEE/Postal code: 23190 /23190
- ^{1} French Land Register data, which excludes lakes, ponds, glaciers > 1 km^{2} (0.386 sq mi or 247 acres) and river estuaries.

Saint-Domet (French pronunciation: [sɛ̃ dɔmɛ]; Occitan: Sent Domèt) is a commune in the Creuse department in central France.

== Geography ==
The river Tardes forms most of the commune's eastern border.

== Population ==
Historical population
Year	Pop.	±% p.a.
1968	317	—
1975	265	−2.53%
1982	238	−1.52%
1990	205	−1.85%
1999	176	−1.68%
2007	176	+0.00%
2012	165	−1.28%
2017	176	+1.30%
2023	160	−1.58%
Source: INSEE

== See also ==
- Communes of the Creuse department
