= Féniers =

Commune in Nouvelle-Aquitaine, France

- Commune
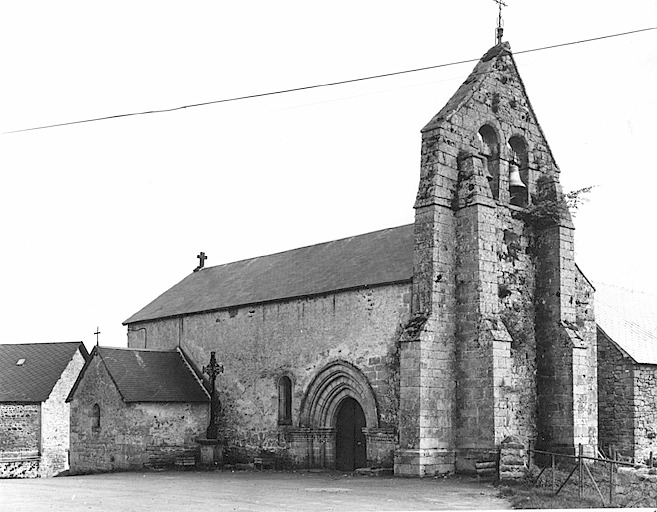
- The church in Féniers
- Location of Féniers
- Location within France Location within Nouvelle-Aquitaine
- Coordinates: 45°45′05″N 2°07′39″E
- Country: France
- Region: Nouvelle-Aquitaine
- Department: Creuse
- Arrondissement: Aubusson
- Canton: Felletin
- Intercommunality: Haute-Corrèze Communauté

Government
  - Mayor (2020–2026): Nathalie Peyrat
- Area^{1}: 14.33 km^{2} (5.53 sq mi)
- Highest elevation: 922 m (3,025 ft)
- Lowest elevation: 772 m (2,533 ft)
- Population (2023): 111
  - Density: 7.75/km^{2} (20.1/sq mi)
- Time zone: UTC+01:00 (CET)
  - Summer (DST): UTC+02:00 (CEST)
- INSEE/Postal code: 23080 /23100
- ^{1} French Land Register data, which excludes lakes, ponds, glaciers > 1 km^{2} (0.386 sq mi or 247 acres) and river estuaries.

Féniers (French pronunciation: [fenje]; Occitan: Feniers) is a commune in the Creuse department in the Nouvelle-Aquitaine region in central France.

== Geography ==
An area of lakes, forestry and farming, comprising the village and several hamlets situated in the upper valley of the Creuse, some 15 miles (24 km) south of Aubusson, at the junction of the D31, D26 and the D8 roads.

== Population ==
Historical population
Year	Pop.	±% p.a.
1968	136	—
1975	128	−0.86%
1982	110	−2.14%
1990	105	−0.58%
1999	93	−1.34%
2007	86	−0.97%
2012	91	+1.14%
2017	94	+0.65%
2023	111	+2.81%
Source: INSEE

== Sights ==
- The twelfth-century church.
- A menhir.

== See also ==
- Communes of the Creuse department
