= Saint-Pardoux-le-Neuf, Creuse =

Commune in Nouvelle-Aquitaine, France

Saint-Pardoux-le-Neuf
- Commune
- Location of Saint-Pardoux-le-Neuf
- Location within France Location within Nouvelle-Aquitaine
- Coordinates: 45°55′50″N 2°14′01″E
- Country: France
- Region: Nouvelle-Aquitaine
- Department: Creuse
- Arrondissement: Aubusson
- Canton: Aubusson
- Intercommunality: CC Creuse Grand Sud

Government
  - Mayor (2020–2026): Gérard Aumeunier
- Area^{1}: 7.51 km^{2} (2.90 sq mi)
- Elevation: 500 m (1,600 ft)
- Highest elevation: 645 m (2,116 ft)
- Lowest elevation: 498 m (1,634 ft)
- Population (2023): 189
  - Density: 25.2/km^{2} (65.2/sq mi)
- Time zone: UTC+01:00 (CET)
  - Summer (DST): UTC+02:00 (CEST)
- INSEE/Postal code: 23228 /23200
- ^{1} French Land Register data, which excludes lakes, ponds, glaciers > 1 km^{2} (0.386 sq mi or 247 acres) and river estuaries.

Saint-Pardoux-le-Neuf (French pronunciation: [sɛ̃ paʁdu lə nœf]; Occitan: Sent Pardós lo Nuòu) is a commune in the Creuse department in central France.

== Population ==
Historical population
Year	Pop.	±% p.a.
1968	146	—
1975	153	+0.67%
1982	175	+1.94%
1990	164	−0.81%
1999	165	+0.07%
2007	174	+0.67%
2012	181	+0.79%
2017	192	+1.19%
2023	189	−0.26%
Source: INSEE

== See also ==
- Communes of the Creuse department
