= La Villedieu, Creuse =

Commune in Nouvelle-Aquitaine, France

La Villedieu
- Commune
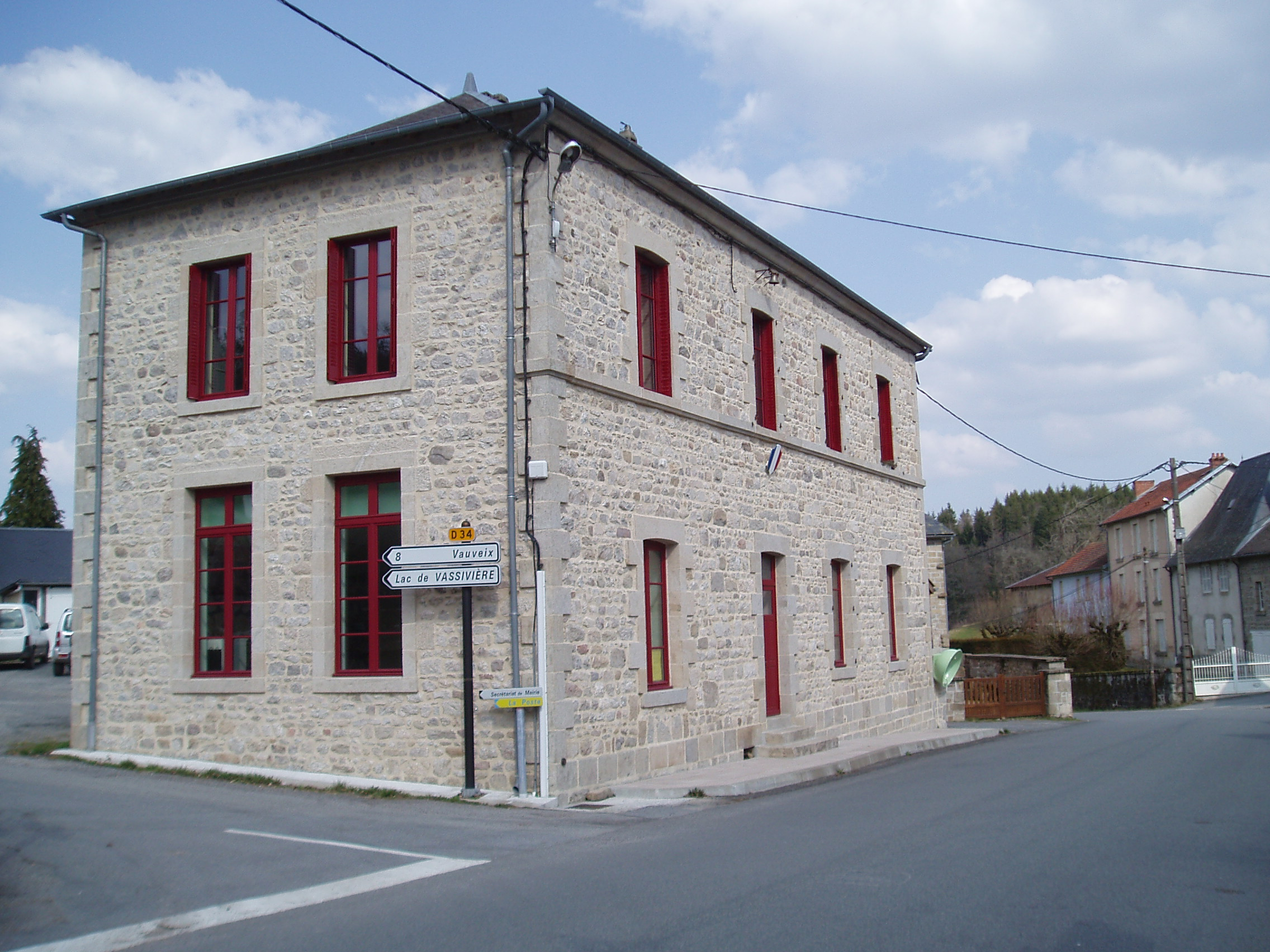
- Town hall
- Location of La Villedieu
- Location within France Location within Nouvelle-Aquitaine
- Coordinates: 45°44′03″N 1°53′15″E
- Country: France
- Region: Nouvelle-Aquitaine
- Department: Creuse
- Arrondissement: Aubusson
- Canton: Felletin
- Intercommunality: CC Creuse Grand Sud

Government
  - Mayor (2020–2026): Thierry Letellier
- Area^{1}: 5.63 km^{2} (2.17 sq mi)
- Highest elevation: 717 m (2,352 ft)
- Lowest elevation: 532 m (1,745 ft)
- Population (2023): 52
  - Density: 9.2/km^{2} (24/sq mi)
- Time zone: UTC+01:00 (CET)
  - Summer (DST): UTC+02:00 (CEST)
- INSEE/Postal code: 23264 /23340
- ^{1} French Land Register data, which excludes lakes, ponds, glaciers > 1 km^{2} (0.386 sq mi or 247 acres) and river estuaries.

La Villedieu (French pronunciation: [la vildjø]; Occitan: La Viala-Diau) is a commune in the Creuse department in the Nouvelle-Aquitaine region in central France.

== Geography ==
A very small farming village situated some 19 miles (31 km) southwest of Aubusson, at the junction of the D34 with the D992 road.

== Population ==
Historical population
| Year | Pop. | ±% p.a. |
|---|---|---|
| 1968 | 91 | — |
| 1975 | 72 | −3.29% |
| 1982 | 55 | −3.77% |
| 1990 | 53 | −0.46% |
| 1999 | 43 | −2.30% |
| 2007 | 46 | +0.85% |
| 2012 | 45 | −0.44% |
| 2017 | 48 | +1.30% |
| 2023 | 52 | +1.34% |
Source: INSEE

== Sights ==
- The twelfth-century church.

== See also ==
- Communes of the Creuse department
