= Faux-la-Montagne =

Commune in Nouvelle-Aquitaine, France

- Commune
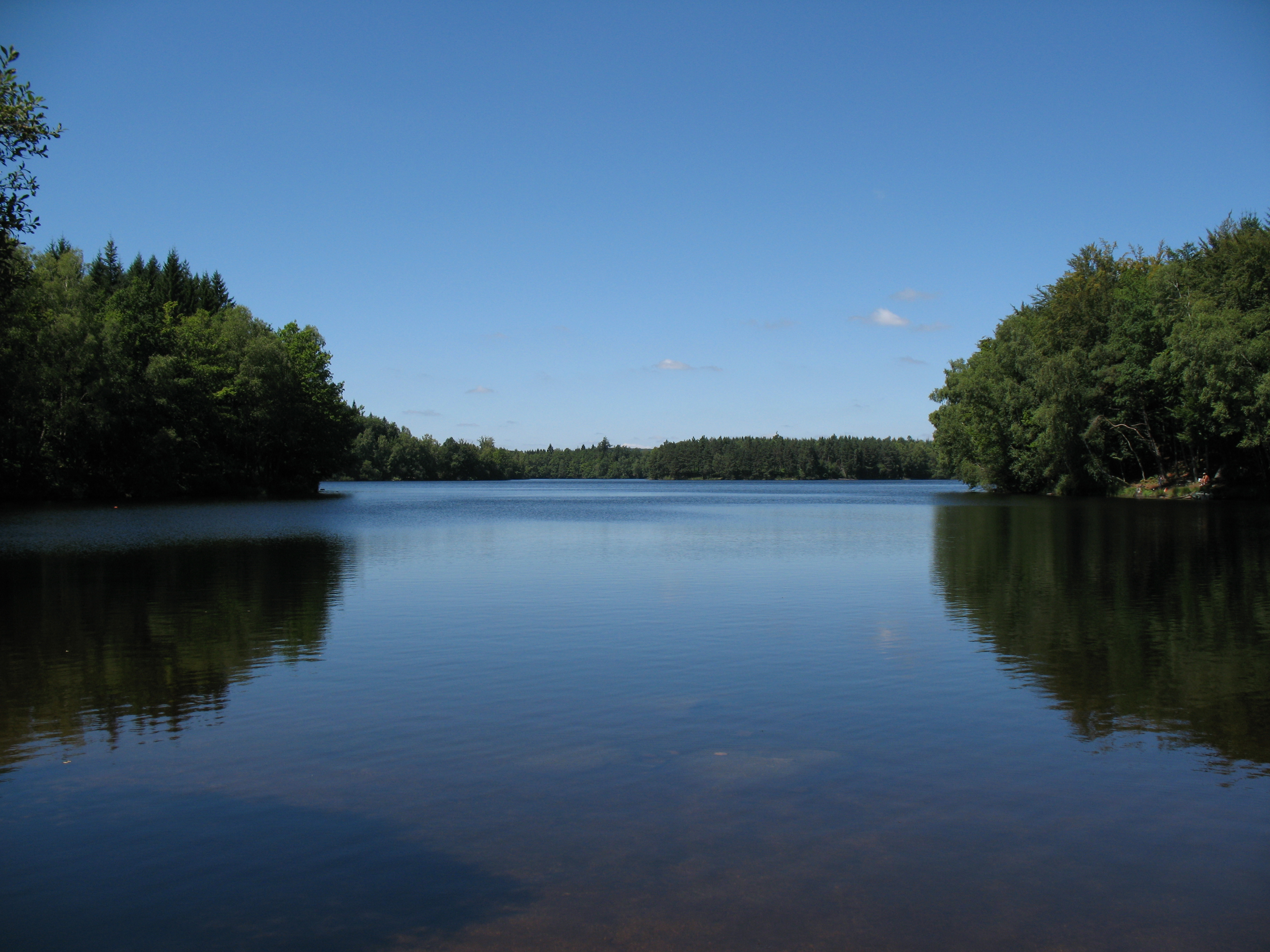
- Faux Lake
- Location of Faux-la-Montagne
- Location within France Location within Nouvelle-Aquitaine
- Coordinates: 45°45′06″N 1°56′08″E
- Country: France
- Region: Nouvelle-Aquitaine
- Department: Creuse
- Arrondissement: Aubusson
- Canton: Felletin
- Intercommunality: CC Creuse Grand Sud

Government
  - Mayor (2020–2026): Catherine Moulin
- Area^{1}: 47.89 km^{2} (18.49 sq mi)
- Highest elevation: 826 m (2,710 ft)
- Lowest elevation: 525 m (1,722 ft)
- Population (2023): 443
  - Density: 9.25/km^{2} (24.0/sq mi)
- Time zone: UTC+01:00 (CET)
  - Summer (DST): UTC+02:00 (CEST)
- INSEE/Postal code: 23077 /23340
- ^{1} French Land Register data, which excludes lakes, ponds, glaciers > 1 km^{2} (0.386 sq mi or 247 acres) and river estuaries.

Faux-la-Montagne (French pronunciation: [fo la mɔ̃taɲ]; Occitan: Faus lo Montanha) is a commune in the Creuse department in the Nouvelle-Aquitaine region in central France.

== Geography ==
An area of lakes and streams, forestry and farming comprising the village and several hamlets some 19 miles (31 km) southwest of Aubusson at the junction of the D3, D85 and the D992 roads. On its southern and eastern sides, the commune borders the department of Corrèze and is within the national park of the Millevaches (not 1000 cows, but lakes).

== Population ==
Historical population
Year	Pop.	±% p.a.
1968	565	—
1975	417	−4.25%
1982	396	−0.74%
1990	391	−0.16%
1999	394	+0.08%
2007	366	−0.92%
2012	352	−0.78%
2017	421	+3.64%
2023	443	+0.85%
Source: INSEE

== Sights ==
- The twelfth-century church.
- Two chapels.
- A dolmen at Landoras
- The Lac de Vassivière and the dam, built in 1952.
- Two châteaux, at the hamlets of La Feuillade and Thézillat.

== See also ==
- Communes of the Creuse department
