= Sainte-Feyre-la-Montagne =

Commune in Nouvelle-Aquitaine, France

- Commune
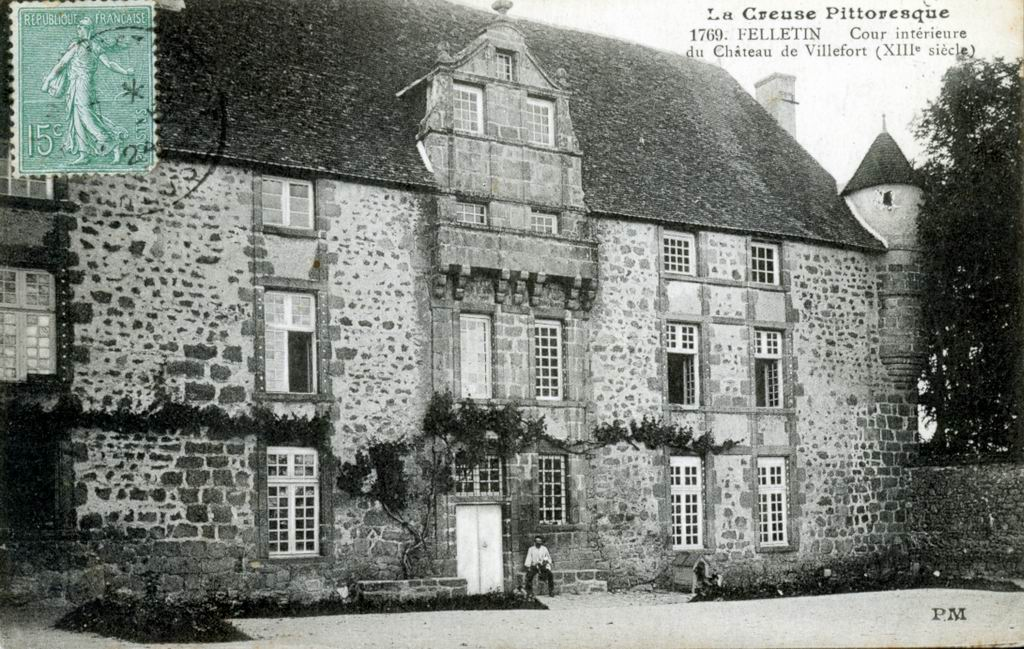
- The Château of Villefort
- Location of Sainte-Feyre-la-Montagne
- Location within France Location within Nouvelle-Aquitaine
- Coordinates: 45°53′59″N 2°14′00″E
- Country: France
- Region: Nouvelle-Aquitaine
- Department: Creuse
- Arrondissement: Aubusson
- Canton: Felletin
- Intercommunality: CC Creuse Grand Sud

Government
  - Mayor (2020–2026): Claude Bialoux
- Area^{1}: 6.84 km^{2} (2.64 sq mi)
- Highest elevation: 688 m (2,257 ft)
- Lowest elevation: 540 m (1,770 ft)
- Population (2023): 121
  - Density: 17.7/km^{2} (45.8/sq mi)
- Time zone: UTC+01:00 (CET)
  - Summer (DST): UTC+02:00 (CEST)
- INSEE/Postal code: 23194 /23500
- ^{1} French Land Register data, which excludes lakes, ponds, glaciers > 1 km^{2} (0.386 sq mi or 247 acres) and river estuaries.

Sainte-Feyre-la-Montagne (French pronunciation: [sɛ̃t fɛʁ la mɔ̃taɲ]; Occitan: Sent Afeiran la Montanha) is a commune in the Creuse department in central France.

== Population ==
Historical population
Year	Pop.	±% p.a.
1968	138	—
1975	133	−0.53%
1982	144	+1.14%
1990	144	+0.00%
1999	122	−1.83%
2007	111	−1.17%
2012	132	+3.53%
2017	130	−0.30%
2023	121	−1.19%
Source: INSEE

== See also ==
- Communes of the Creuse department
