= Saint-Amand, Creuse =

Commune in Nouvelle-Aquitaine, France

Saint-Amand
- Commune
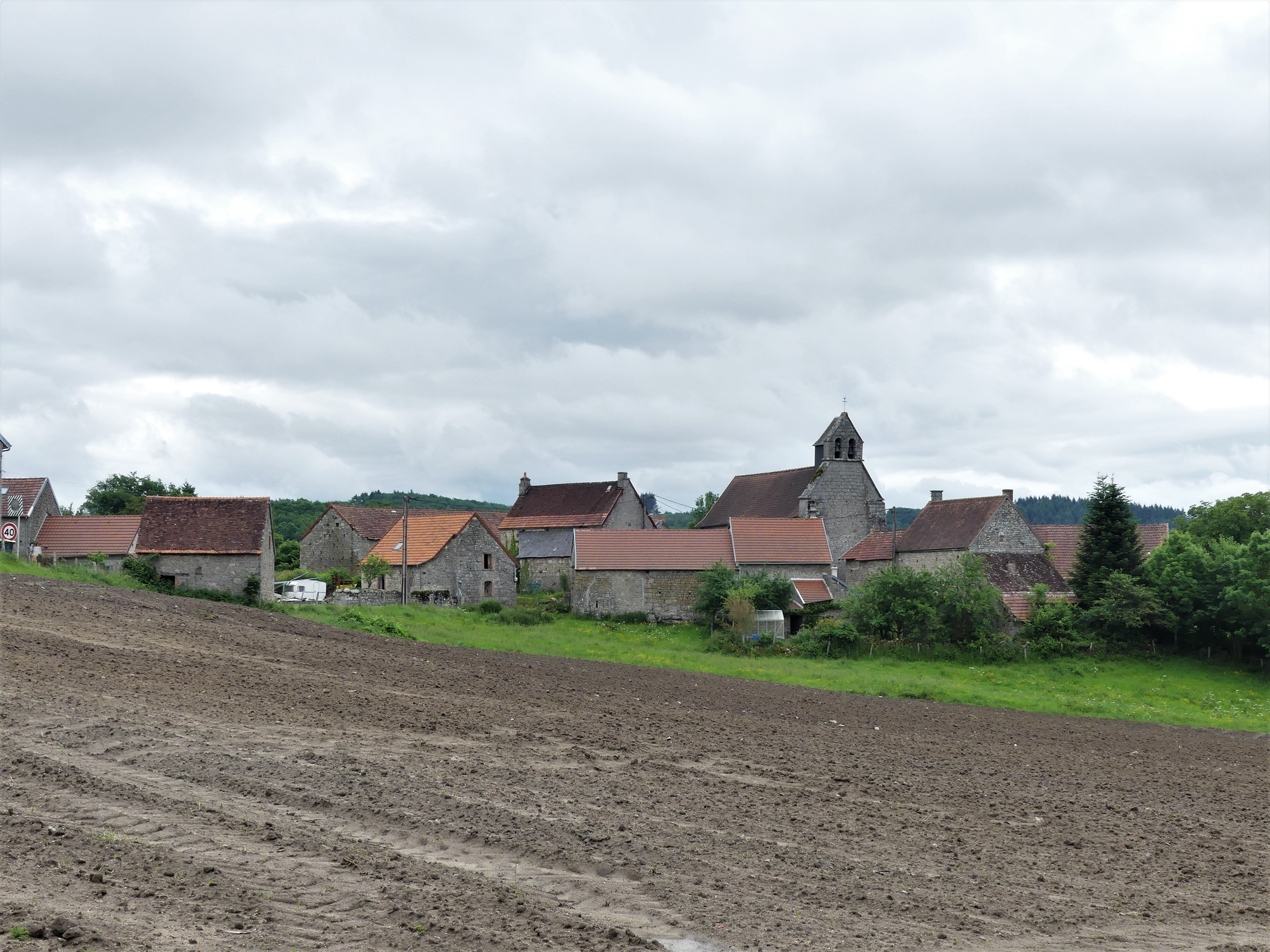
- Town of Saint-Amand
- Location of Saint-Amand
- Location within France Location within Nouvelle-Aquitaine
- Coordinates: 45°58′57″N 2°12′32″E
- Country: France
- Region: Nouvelle-Aquitaine
- Department: Creuse
- Arrondissement: Aubusson
- Canton: Aubusson
- Intercommunality: CC Creuse Grand Sud

Government
  - Mayor (2020–2026): Laurence Chevreux
- Area^{1}: 8.05 km^{2} (3.11 sq mi)
- Elevation: 480 m (1,570 ft)
- Highest elevation: 641 m (2,103 ft)
- Lowest elevation: 477 m (1,565 ft)
- Population (2023): 449
  - Density: 55.8/km^{2} (144/sq mi)
- Time zone: UTC+01:00 (CET)
  - Summer (DST): UTC+02:00 (CEST)
- INSEE/Postal code: 23180 /23200
- ^{1} French Land Register data, which excludes lakes, ponds, glaciers > 1 km^{2} (0.386 sq mi or 247 acres) and river estuaries.

Saint-Amand (French pronunciation: [sɛ̃.t‿amɑ̃]; Auvergnat: Sent Amand) is a commune in the Creuse department of the region Nouvelle-Aquitaine in central France.

== Politics and administration ==
=== List of mayors ===
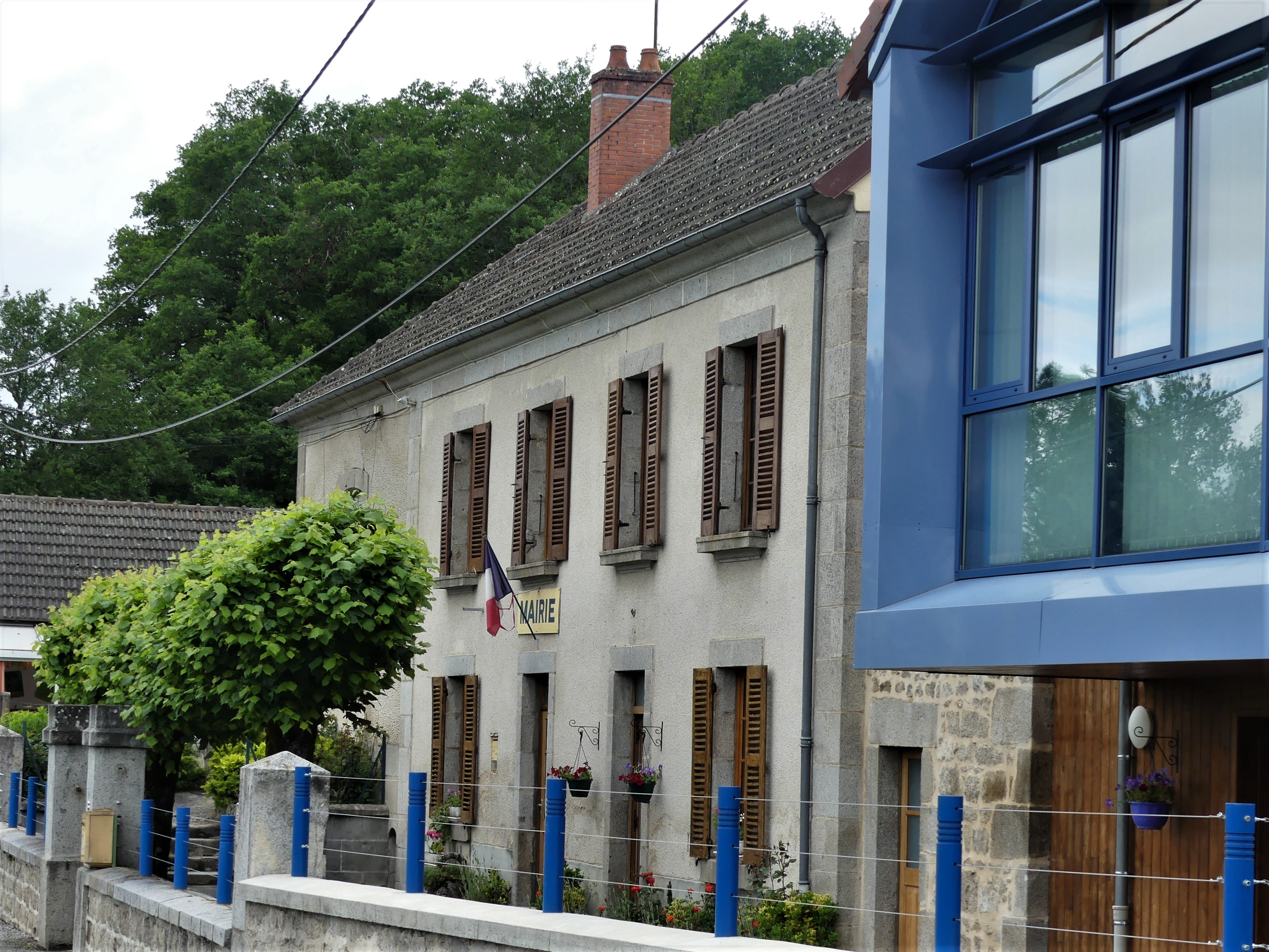
Mairie de Saint-Amand

List of successive mayors of Saint-Amand
In office		Mayor	Party	Capacity	Ref.
Incomplete values are to be completed.
March 2001	March 2008	Jean-Jacques Nadaud	DVD	General Councillor	
March 2008	July 2020	Jean-Marie Le Guiader	DVD	Professor	
July 2020	Incumbent	Laurence Chevreux			

== Population and demographics ==
Historical population
Year	Pop.	±% p.a.
1968	234	—
1975	243	+0.54%
1982	307	+3.40%
1990	534	+7.16%
1999	527	−0.15%
2007	516	−0.26%
2012	506	−0.39%
2017	493	−0.52%
2023	449	−1.55%
Source: INSEE

== Local culture and heritage ==
=== Historic locations and monuments ===
- The Château de Fot in neo-gothic style.
- Saint-Amand church with its bell-gable.

== See also ==
- Communes of the Creuse department
