= Saint-Yrieix-la-Montagne =

Commune in Nouvelle-Aquitaine, France

- Commune
- Location of Saint-Yrieix-la-Montagne
- Location within France Location within Nouvelle-Aquitaine
- Coordinates: 45°53′02″N 2°01′21″E
- Country: France
- Region: Nouvelle-Aquitaine
- Department: Creuse
- Arrondissement: Aubusson
- Canton: Felletin
- Intercommunality: CC Creuse Grand Sud

Government
  - Mayor (2020–2026): Didier Miomandre
- Area^{1}: 24.04 km^{2} (9.28 sq mi)
- Elevation: 613 m (2,011 ft)
- Highest elevation: 736 m (2,415 ft)
- Lowest elevation: 556 m (1,824 ft)
- Population (2023): 219
  - Density: 9.11/km^{2} (23.6/sq mi)
- Time zone: UTC+01:00 (CET)
  - Summer (DST): UTC+02:00 (CEST)
- INSEE/Postal code: 23249 /23460
- ^{1} French Land Register data, which excludes lakes, ponds, glaciers > 1 km^{2} (0.386 sq mi or 247 acres) and river estuaries.

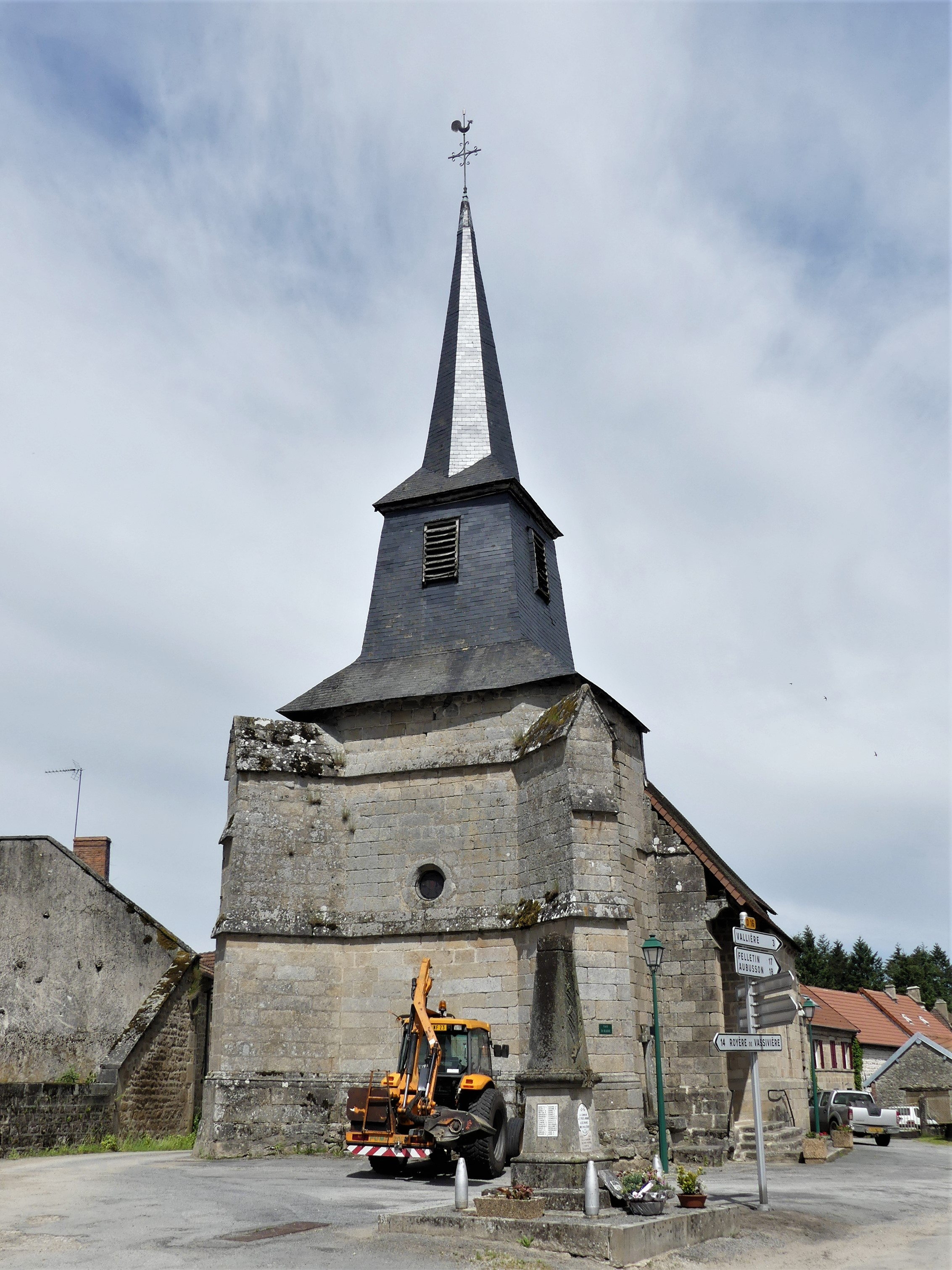
Saint-Yrieix-la-Montagne église

Saint-Yrieix-la-Montagne (French pronunciation: [sɛ̃.t‿iʁjɛ la mɔ̃taɲ]; Occitan: Sent Iries la Montanha) is a commune in the Creuse department in central France.

== Population ==
Historical population
Year	Pop.	±% p.a.
1968	327	—
1975	324	−0.13%
1982	303	−0.95%
1990	283	−0.85%
1999	233	−2.14%
2007	230	−0.16%
2012	212	−1.62%
2017	224	+1.11%
2023	219	−0.38%
Source: INSEE

== See also ==
- Communes of the Creuse department
