= Saint-Quentin-la-Chabanne =

Commune in Nouvelle-Aquitaine, France

- Commune
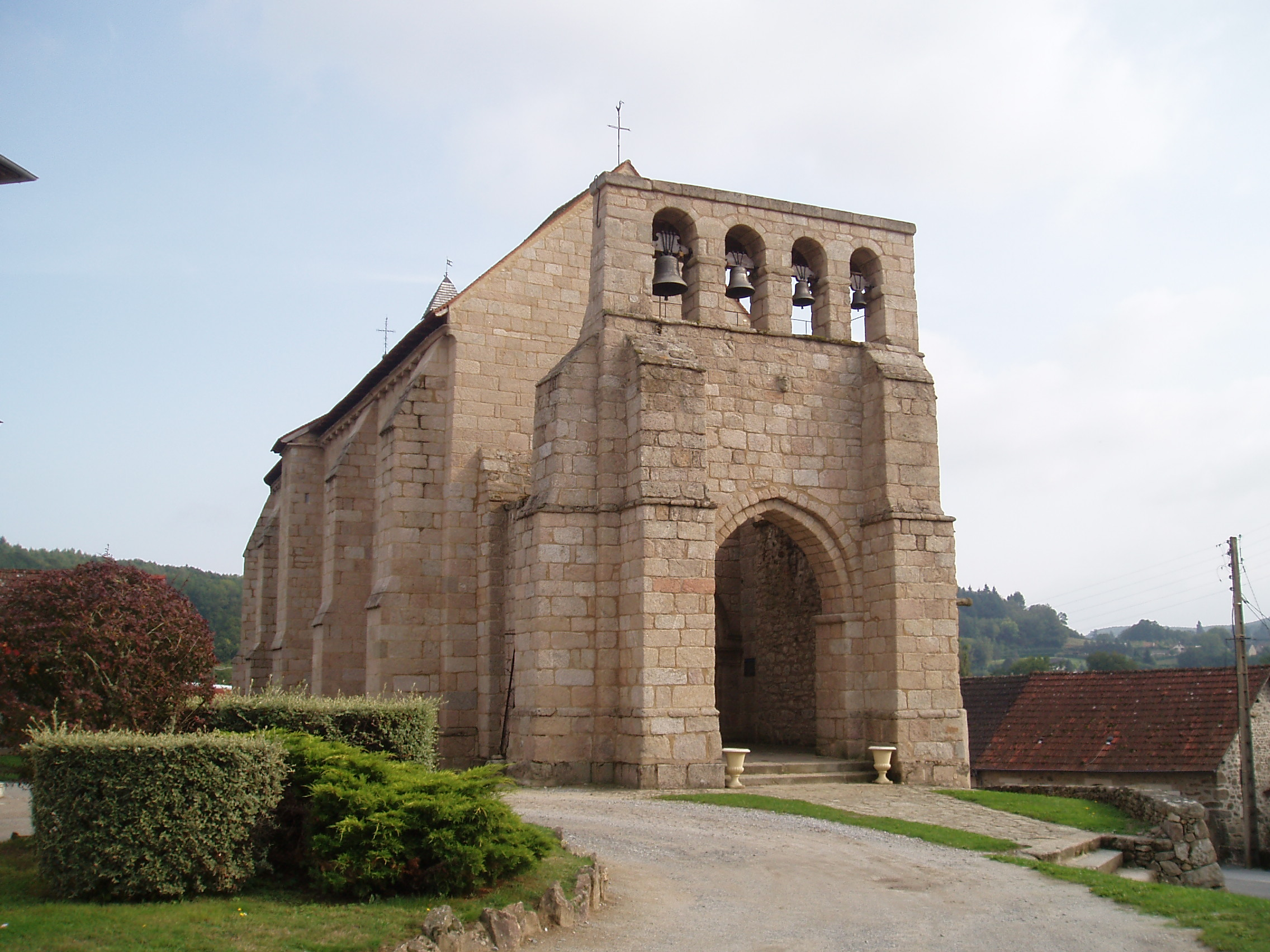
- The church in Saint-Quentin-la-Chabanne
- Location of Saint-Quentin-la-Chabanne
- Location within France Location within Nouvelle-Aquitaine
- Coordinates: 45°51′55″N 2°09′21″E
- Country: France
- Region: Nouvelle-Aquitaine
- Department: Creuse
- Arrondissement: Aubusson
- Canton: Felletin
- Intercommunality: CC Creuse Grand Sud

Government
  - Mayor (2020–2026): Denis Priouret
- Area^{1}: 29.59 km^{2} (11.42 sq mi)
- Elevation: 550 m (1,800 ft)
- Highest elevation: 811 m (2,661 ft)
- Lowest elevation: 460 m (1,510 ft)
- Population (2023): 362
  - Density: 12.2/km^{2} (31.7/sq mi)
- Time zone: UTC+01:00 (CET)
  - Summer (DST): UTC+02:00 (CEST)
- INSEE/Postal code: 23238 /23500
- ^{1} French Land Register data, which excludes lakes, ponds, glaciers > 1 km^{2} (0.386 sq mi or 247 acres) and river estuaries.

Saint-Quentin-la-Chabanne (French pronunciation: [sɛ̃ kɑ̃tɛ̃ la ʃaban]; Occitan: Sent Quentin) is a commune in the Creuse department in central France.

== Population ==
Historical population
Year	Pop.	±% p.a.
1968	431	—
1975	419	−0.40%
1982	416	−0.10%
1990	443	+0.79%
1999	372	−1.92%
2007	354	−0.62%
2012	354	+0.00%
2017	404	+2.68%
2023	362	−1.81%
Source: INSEE

== See also ==
- Communes of the Creuse department
