= Saint-Avit-de-Tardes =

Commune in Nouvelle-Aquitaine, France

- Commune
- Location of Saint-Avit-de-Tardes
- Location within France Location within Nouvelle-Aquitaine
- Coordinates: 45°55′08″N 2°17′10″E
- Country: France
- Region: Nouvelle-Aquitaine
- Department: Creuse
- Arrondissement: Aubusson
- Canton: Aubusson
- Intercommunality: CC Creuse Grand Sud

Government
  - Mayor (2020–2026): Pierrette Legros
- Area^{1}: 14.42 km^{2} (5.57 sq mi)
- Elevation: 540 m (1,770 ft)
- Highest elevation: 699 m (2,293 ft)
- Lowest elevation: 504 m (1,654 ft)
- Population (2023): 159
  - Density: 11.0/km^{2} (28.6/sq mi)
- Time zone: UTC+01:00 (CET)
  - Summer (DST): UTC+02:00 (CEST)
- INSEE/Postal code: 23182 /23200
- ^{1} French Land Register data, which excludes lakes, ponds, glaciers > 1 km^{2} (0.386 sq mi or 247 acres) and river estuaries.

Saint-Avit-de-Tardes (Occitan: Sant Avit de Tard) is a commune in the Creuse department in central France.

== Geography ==
The village lies on the left bank of the Tardes, which flows west through the southern part of the commune, then north through its western part.

== Population ==
Historical population
Year	Pop.	±% p.a.
1968	284	—
1975	248	−1.92%
1982	212	−2.22%
1990	206	−0.36%
1999	171	−2.05%
2007	191	+1.39%
2012	182	−0.96%
2017	173	−1.01%
2023	159	−1.40%
Source: INSEE

== See also ==
- Communes of the Creuse department
