= Felletin =

Commune in Nouvelle-Aquitaine, France

- Commune
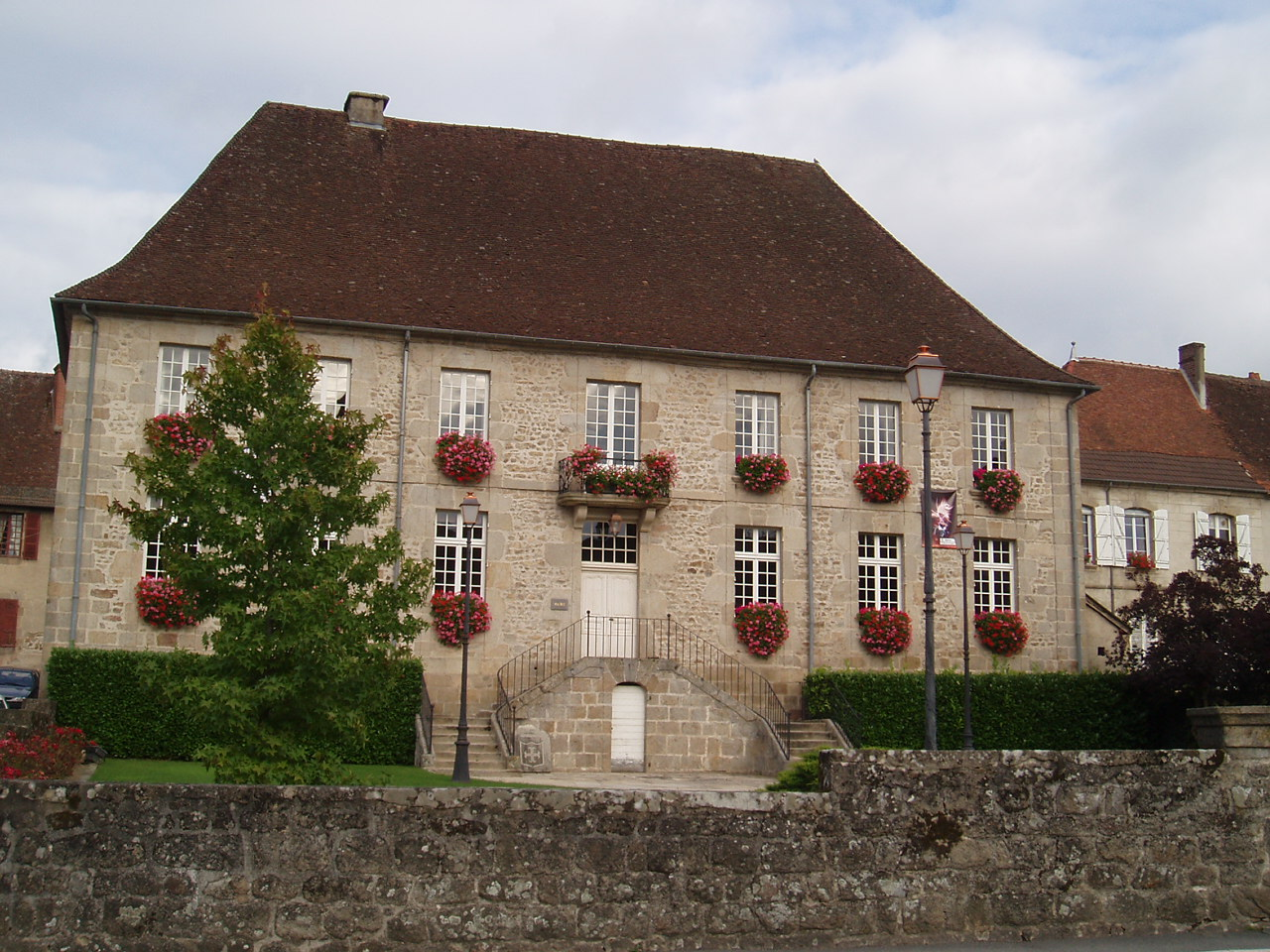
- The town hall of Felletin

- Coat of arms
- Location of Felletin
- Location within France Location within Nouvelle-Aquitaine
- Coordinates: 45°53′04″N 2°10′25″E
- Country: France
- Region: Nouvelle-Aquitaine
- Department: Creuse
- Arrondissement: Aubusson
- Canton: Felletin
- Intercommunality: CC Creuse Grand Sud

Government
  - Mayor (2024–2026): Olivier Cagnon
- Area^{1}: 13.74 km^{2} (5.31 sq mi)
- Highest elevation: 685 m (2,247 ft)
- Lowest elevation: 459 m (1,506 ft)
- Population (2023): 1,577
  - Density: 114.8/km^{2} (297.3/sq mi)
- Time zone: UTC+01:00 (CET)
  - Summer (DST): UTC+02:00 (CEST)
- INSEE/Postal code: 23079 /23500
- ^{1} French Land Register data, which excludes lakes, ponds, glaciers > 1 km^{2} (0.386 sq mi or 247 acres) and river estuaries.

Felletin (French pronunciation: [fɛltɛ̃]; Occitan: Falatin) is a commune in the Creuse department in the Nouvelle-Aquitaine region in central France.

Historically, the term Aubusson tapestry often covers the similar products made in the nearby town of Felletin, 8 kilometres away, whose products are often treated as "Aubusson". The industry had probably developed since soon after 1300 in looms in family workshops, perhaps already run by the Flemings that are noted in documents from the 16th century.

== Geography ==
An area of lakes and streams, forestry and farming comprising a small town and several villages and hamlets situated by the banks of the Creuse just 5 miles (8.0 km) south of Aubusson at the junction of the D10, D19, D23 and the D982 roads. The commune is within the national park of the Millevaches (not 1000 cows, but lakes). The very last passenger train to ever arrive at Felletin railway station was the TER service from Limoges Bénédictins, which pulled in shortly before 7:15 PM on Sunday, August 31, 2025, permanently ending the station's 143-year operational history. A regular rail service to Felletin (and also Aubusson) is no longer active. [1]

== Population ==
The town had 3,814 inhabitants in 1841.

Historical population
Year	Pop.	±% p.a.
1968	2,278	—
1975	2,291	+0.08%
1982	2,196	−0.60%
1990	1,985	−1.25%
1999	1,892	−0.53%
2007	1,889	−0.02%
2012	1,760	−1.40%
2017	1,593	−1.97%
2023	1,577	−0.17%
Source: INSEE

== Sights ==
- The twelfth-century church.
- Three chapels from the fifteenth century.
- The church of Notre-Dame, from the fifteenth century.
- Two dolmens.
- A thirteenth-century castle and later ramparts
- The present and previous mairies, both dating from the eighteenth century.
- Several ancient houses.
- A medieval bridge over the Creuse.
- A thirteenth-century octagonal monument in the cemetery.

== Personalities ==
- Fernand de Brinon, French wartime Nazi collaborator, b. 26th Aug 1885, executed 15 April 1947, was buried at Felletin.
- Peter Watkins, British film director, lived in Felletin for the last 25 years of his life.

== International relations ==
Felletin is twinned with:

- Schladming, Austria, since 1960.

== See also ==
- Communes of the Creuse department
