= Saint-Marc-à-Frongier =

Commune in Nouvelle-Aquitaine, France

- Commune
- Location of Saint-Marc-à-Frongier
- Location within France Location within Nouvelle-Aquitaine
- Coordinates: 45°55′51″N 2°07′18″E
- Country: France
- Region: Nouvelle-Aquitaine
- Department: Creuse
- Arrondissement: Aubusson
- Canton: Aubusson
- Intercommunality: CC Creuse Grand Sud

Government
  - Mayor (2020–2026): Jean-Louis Joslin
- Area^{1}: 25.45 km^{2} (9.83 sq mi)
- Elevation: 572 m (1,877 ft)
- Highest elevation: 715 m (2,346 ft)
- Lowest elevation: 493 m (1,617 ft)
- Population (2023): 428
  - Density: 16.8/km^{2} (43.6/sq mi)
- Time zone: UTC+01:00 (CET)
  - Summer (DST): UTC+02:00 (CEST)
- INSEE/Postal code: 23211 /23200
- ^{1} French Land Register data, which excludes lakes, ponds, glaciers > 1 km^{2} (0.386 sq mi or 247 acres) and river estuaries.

Saint-Marc-à-Frongier (French pronunciation: [sɛ̃ maʁk a fʁɔ̃ʒje]; Occitan: Sent Marc a Frongier) is a commune in the Creuse department in central France.

== Population ==
Historical population
Year	Pop.	±% p.a.
1968	394	—
1975	367	−1.01%
1982	376	+0.35%
1990	407	+1.00%
1999	348	−1.73%
2007	350	+0.07%
2012	366	+0.90%
2017	425	+3.03%
2023	428	+0.12%
Source: INSEE

== See also ==
- Communes of the Creuse department
