= Saint-Maixant, Creuse =

Commune in Nouvelle-Aquitaine, France

Saint-Maixant
- Commune
- Coat of arms
- Location of Saint-Maixant
- Location within France Location within Nouvelle-Aquitaine
- Coordinates: 45°59′40″N 2°12′29″E
- Country: France
- Region: Nouvelle-Aquitaine
- Department: Creuse
- Arrondissement: Aubusson
- Canton: Aubusson
- Intercommunality: CC Creuse Grand Sud

Government
  - Mayor (2020–2026): Evelyne Pinlon
- Area^{1}: 13.86 km^{2} (5.35 sq mi)
- Elevation: 560 m (1,840 ft)
- Highest elevation: 628 m (2,060 ft)
- Lowest elevation: 420 m (1,380 ft)
- Population (2023): 222
  - Density: 16.0/km^{2} (41.5/sq mi)
- Time zone: UTC+01:00 (CET)
  - Summer (DST): UTC+02:00 (CEST)
- INSEE/Postal code: 23210 /23200
- ^{1} French Land Register data, which excludes lakes, ponds, glaciers > 1 km^{2} (0.386 sq mi or 247 acres) and river estuaries.

Saint-Maixant (French pronunciation: [sɛ̃ mɛksɑ̃]; Occitan: Sent Maissenç) is a commune in the Creuse department in central France.

== Population ==
Historical population
Year	Pop.	±% p.a.
1968	320	—
1975	304	−0.73%
1982	298	−0.28%
1990	255	−1.93%
1999	260	+0.22%
2007	228	−1.63%
2012	225	−0.26%
2017	243	+1.55%
2023	222	−1.50%
Source: INSEE

== See also ==
- Communes of the Creuse department
