= Saint-Frion =

Commune in Nouvelle-Aquitaine, France

- Commune
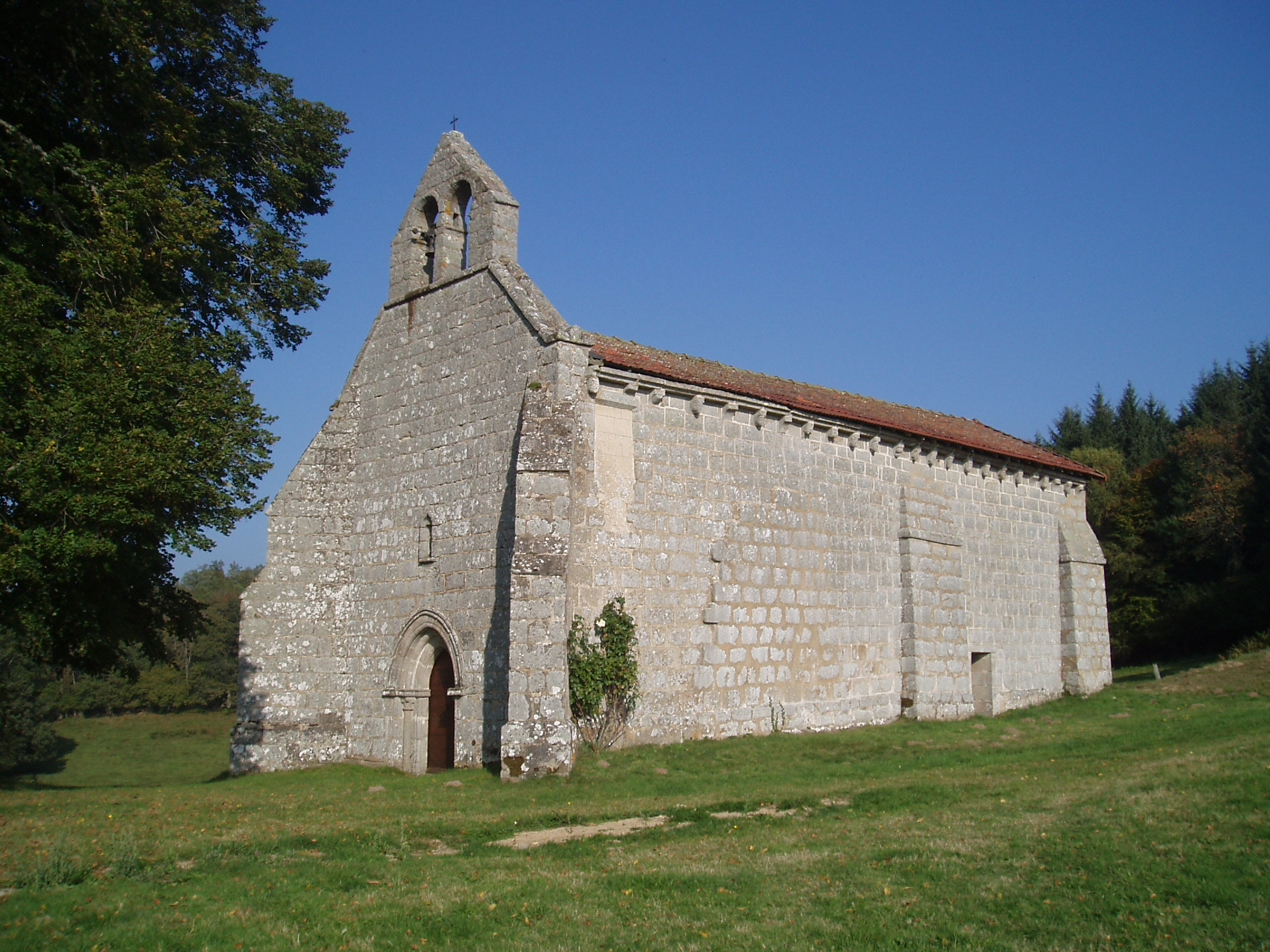
- The chapel Fonteyne, in Saint-Frion
- Location of Saint-Frion
- Location within France Location within Nouvelle-Aquitaine
- Coordinates: 45°51′53″N 2°13′45″E
- Country: France
- Region: Nouvelle-Aquitaine
- Department: Creuse
- Arrondissement: Aubusson
- Canton: Felletin
- Intercommunality: CC Creuse Grand Sud

Government
  - Mayor (2020–2026): Christian Arnaud
- Area^{1}: 18.76 km^{2} (7.24 sq mi)
- Elevation: 695 m (2,280 ft)
- Highest elevation: 727 m (2,385 ft)
- Lowest elevation: 523 m (1,716 ft)
- Population (2023): 251
  - Density: 13.4/km^{2} (34.7/sq mi)
- Time zone: UTC+01:00 (CET)
  - Summer (DST): UTC+02:00 (CEST)
- INSEE/Postal code: 23196 /23500
- ^{1} French Land Register data, which excludes lakes, ponds, glaciers > 1 km^{2} (0.386 sq mi or 247 acres) and river estuaries.

Saint-Frion (French pronunciation: [sɛ̃ fʁijɔ̃]; Occitan: Sent Frion) is a commune in the Creuse department in central France.

== Population ==
Historical population
Year	Pop.	±% p.a.
1968	238	—
1975	225	−0.80%
1982	191	−2.31%
1990	180	−0.74%
1999	177	−0.19%
2007	191	+0.96%
2012	242	+4.85%
2017	254	+0.97%
2023	251	−0.20%
Source: INSEE

== See also ==
- Communes of the Creuse department
