= Canton of Felletin =

Coordinates: 45°52′27″N 2°09′30″E

Felletin
- Canton
- Interactive map of Felletin
- Country: France
- Region: Nouvelle-Aquitaine
- Department: Creuse
- No. of communes: {{{nbcomm}}}
- Area: 577.45 km^{2} (222.95 sq mi)
- Population (2023): 6,471
  - Density: 11.21/km^{2} (29.02/sq mi)
- INSEE code: 23 09

The Canton of Felletin is a canton situated in the Creuse département and in the Nouvelle-Aquitaine region of central France.

== Geography ==
An area of farming and wooded valleys, with the town of Felletin, in the arrondissement of Aubusson, at its centre. The altitude varies from 437m (Moutier-Rozeille) to 861m (Poussanges) with an average altitude of 596m.

== Composition ==
At the French canton reorganisation which came into effect in March 2015, the canton was expanded from 9 to 19 communes:

- Croze
- Faux-la-Montagne
- Felletin
- Féniers
- Gentioux-Pigerolles
- Gioux
- Le Monteil-au-Vicomte
- Moutier-Rozeille
- La Nouaille
- Poussanges
- Royère-de-Vassivière
- Sainte-Feyre-la-Montagne
- Saint-Frion
- Saint-Marc-à-Loubaud
- Saint-Martin-Château
- Saint-Quentin-la-Chabanne
- Saint-Yrieix-la-Montagne
- Vallière
- La Villedieu

== See also ==
- Arrondissements of the Creuse department
- Cantons of the Creuse department
- Communes of the Creuse department
