= La Nouaille =

Commune in Nouvelle-Aquitaine, France

- Commune
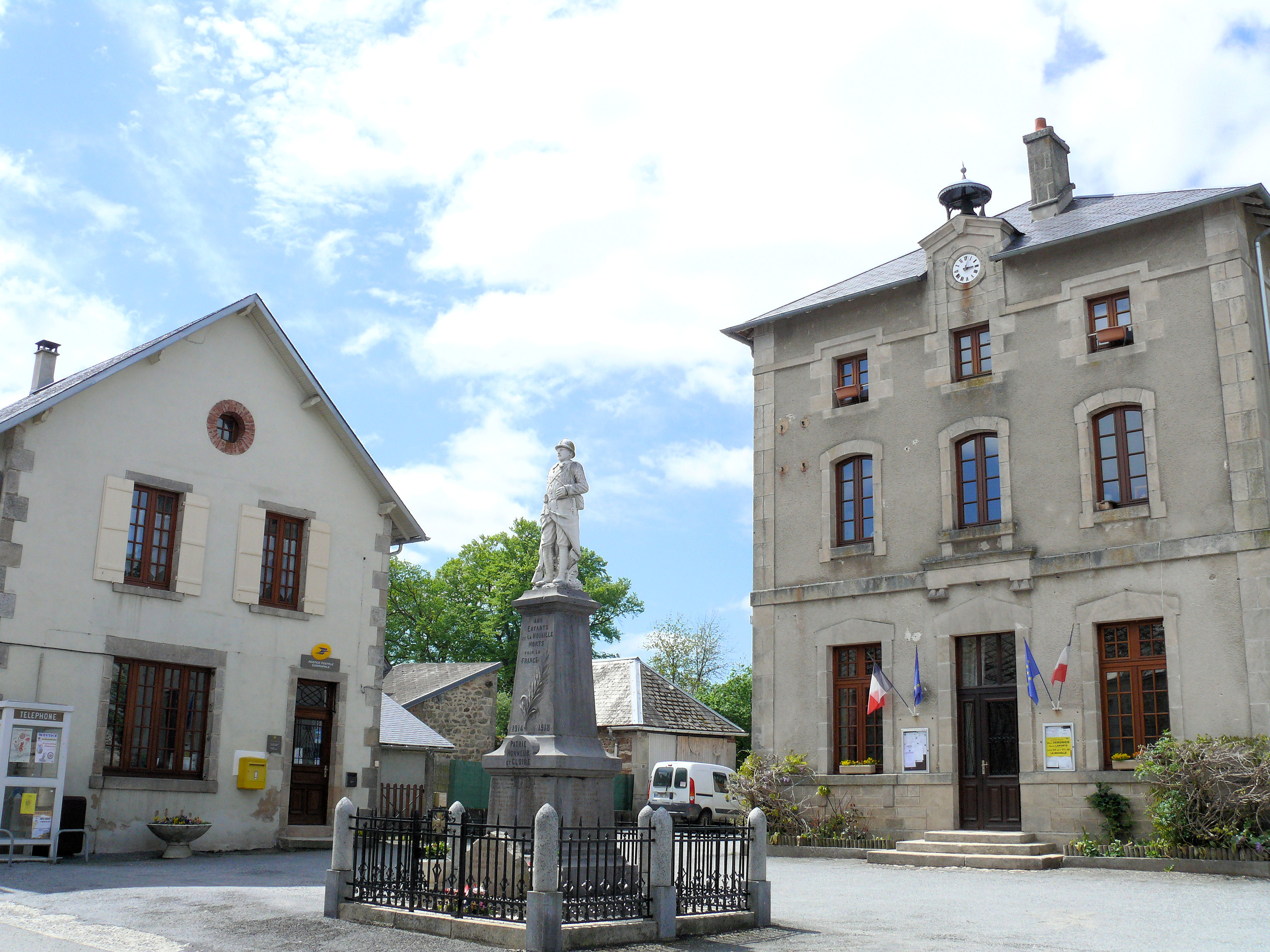
- The town hall and the war memorial, in La Nouaille
- Location of La Nouaille
- Location within France Location within Nouvelle-Aquitaine
- Coordinates: 45°50′51″N 2°03′56″E
- Country: France
- Region: Nouvelle-Aquitaine
- Department: Creuse
- Arrondissement: Aubusson
- Canton: Felletin
- Intercommunality: CC Creuse Grand Sud

Government
  - Mayor (2020–2026): Nadine Ravet
- Area^{1}: 48.12 km^{2} (18.58 sq mi)
- Highest elevation: 846 m (2,776 ft)
- Lowest elevation: 576 m (1,890 ft)
- Population (2023): 224
  - Density: 4.66/km^{2} (12.1/sq mi)
- Time zone: UTC+01:00 (CET)
  - Summer (DST): UTC+02:00 (CEST)
- INSEE/Postal code: 23144 /23500
- ^{1} French Land Register data, which excludes lakes, ponds, glaciers > 1 km^{2} (0.386 sq mi or 247 acres) and river estuaries.

La Nouaille (French pronunciation: [la nwaj]; Occitan: La Noalha) is a commune in the Creuse department in the Nouvelle-Aquitaine region in central France.

== Geography ==
An area of lakes, forestry and farming comprising a small village and a couple of hamlets situated in the valleys of the Thaurion and Banize rivers, some 10 miles (16 km) southwest of Aubusson, at the junction of the D26 with the D59 and on the D992 road.

== Population ==
Historical population
Year	Pop.	±% p.a.
1968	401	—
1975	379	−0.80%
1982	329	−2.00%
1990	264	−2.71%
1999	248	−0.69%
2007	245	−0.15%
2012	255	+0.80%
2017	249	−0.48%
2023	224	−1.75%
Source: INSEE

== Sights ==
- The twelfth-century church of Saint-Pierre-et-Saint-Paul.
- The fifteenth-century manorhouse, the Domaine de Banizette, a national heritage site.

== See also ==
- Communes of the Creuse department
