= Saint-Alpinien =

Commune in Nouvelle-Aquitaine, France

- Commune
- Location of Saint-Alpinien
- Location within France Location within Nouvelle-Aquitaine
- Coordinates: 45°58′43″N 2°14′20″E
- Country: France
- Region: Nouvelle-Aquitaine
- Department: Creuse
- Arrondissement: Aubusson
- Canton: Aubusson
- Intercommunality: CC Creuse Grand Sud

Government
  - Mayor (2020–2026): Evelyne Chabant
- Area^{1}: 15.21 km^{2} (5.87 sq mi)
- Elevation: 652 m (2,139 ft)
- Highest elevation: 674 m (2,211 ft)
- Lowest elevation: 536 m (1,759 ft)
- Population (2023): 290
  - Density: 19/km^{2} (49/sq mi)
- Time zone: UTC+01:00 (CET)
  - Summer (DST): UTC+02:00 (CEST)
- INSEE/Postal code: 23179 /23200
- ^{1} French Land Register data, which excludes lakes, ponds, glaciers > 1 km^{2} (0.386 sq mi or 247 acres) and river estuaries.

Saint-Alpinien (French pronunciation: [sɛ̃.t‿alpinjɛ̃]; Occitan: Sent Auprian) is a commune in the Creuse department in central France.

== Population ==
Historical population
Year	Pop.	±% p.a.
1968	344	—
1975	316	−1.21%
1982	318	+0.09%
1990	350	+1.21%
1999	320	−0.99%
2007	290	−1.22%
2012	307	+1.15%
2017	273	−2.32%
2023	290	+1.01%
Source: INSEE

== See also ==
- Communes of the Creuse department
