= Saint-Marc-à-Loubaud =

Commune in Nouvelle-Aquitaine, France

- Commune
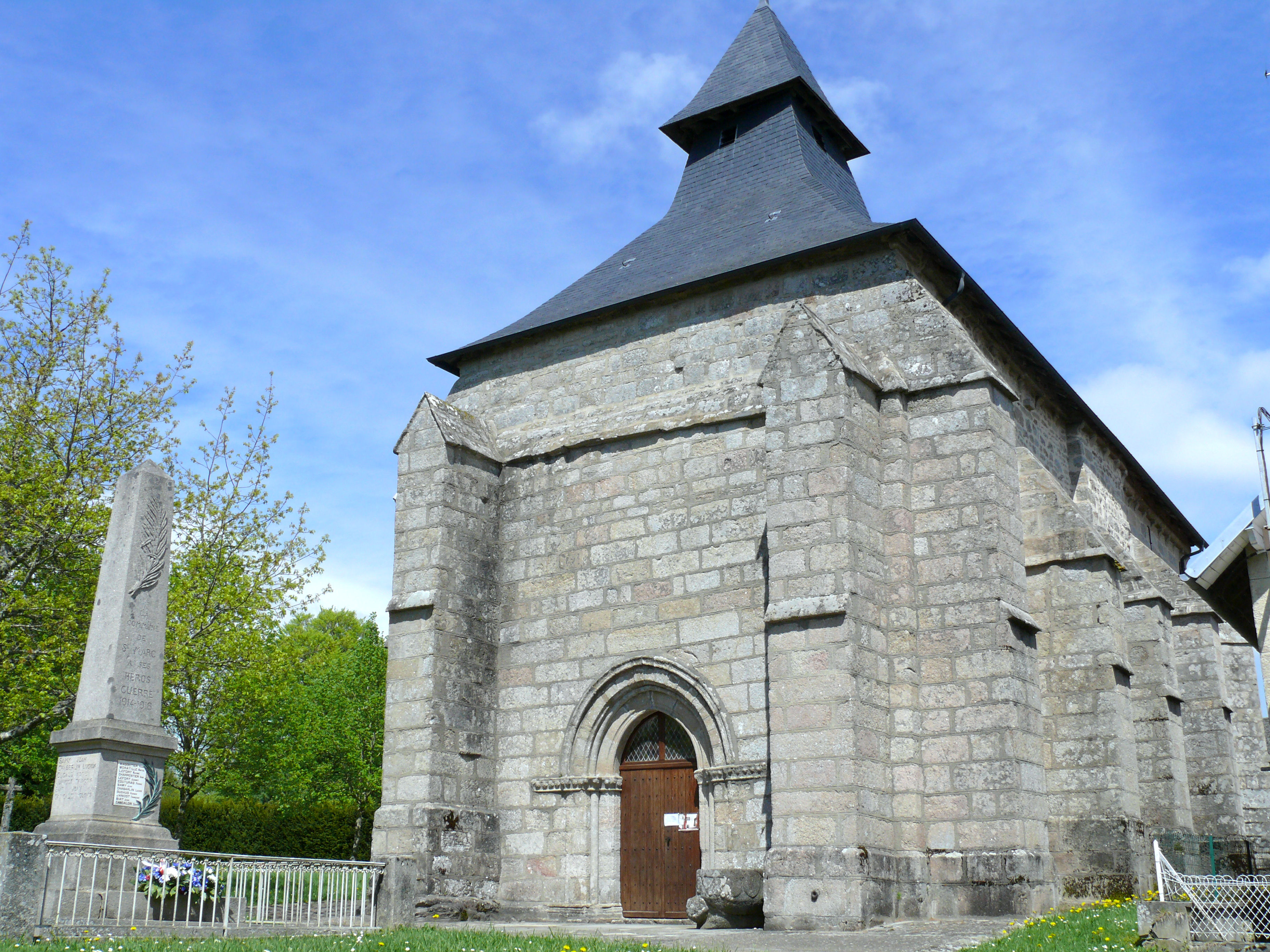
- The church of Saint-Marc-Sainte-Agathe and the war memorial, in Saint-Marc-à-Loubaud
- Location of Saint-Marc-à-Loubaud
- Location within France Location within Nouvelle-Aquitaine
- Coordinates: 45°50′58″N 1°59′50″E
- Country: France
- Region: Nouvelle-Aquitaine
- Department: Creuse
- Arrondissement: Aubusson
- Canton: Felletin
- Intercommunality: CC Creuse Grand Sud

Government
  - Mayor (2020–2026): Roger Fougeron
- Area^{1}: 18.42 km^{2} (7.11 sq mi)
- Elevation: 700 m (2,300 ft)
- Highest elevation: 774 m (2,539 ft)
- Lowest elevation: 634 m (2,080 ft)
- Population (2023): 126
  - Density: 6.84/km^{2} (17.7/sq mi)
- Time zone: UTC+01:00 (CET)
  - Summer (DST): UTC+02:00 (CEST)
- INSEE/Postal code: 23212 /23460
- ^{1} French Land Register data, which excludes lakes, ponds, glaciers > 1 km^{2} (0.386 sq mi or 247 acres) and river estuaries.

Saint-Marc-à-Loubaud (French pronunciation: [sɛ̃ maʁk a lubo]; Occitan: Sent Marc a Lobaud) is a commune in the Creuse department in central France.

== Population ==
Historical population
Year	Pop.	±% p.a.
1968	166	—
1975	134	−3.01%
1982	107	−3.16%
1990	91	−2.00%
1999	122	+3.31%
2007	134	+1.18%
2012	139	+0.74%
2017	136	−0.44%
2023	126	−1.26%
Source: INSEE

== See also ==
- Communes of the Creuse department
