= Aubusson, Creuse =

Subprefecture and commune in Nouvelle-Aquitaine, France

Aubusson
- Subprefecture and commune
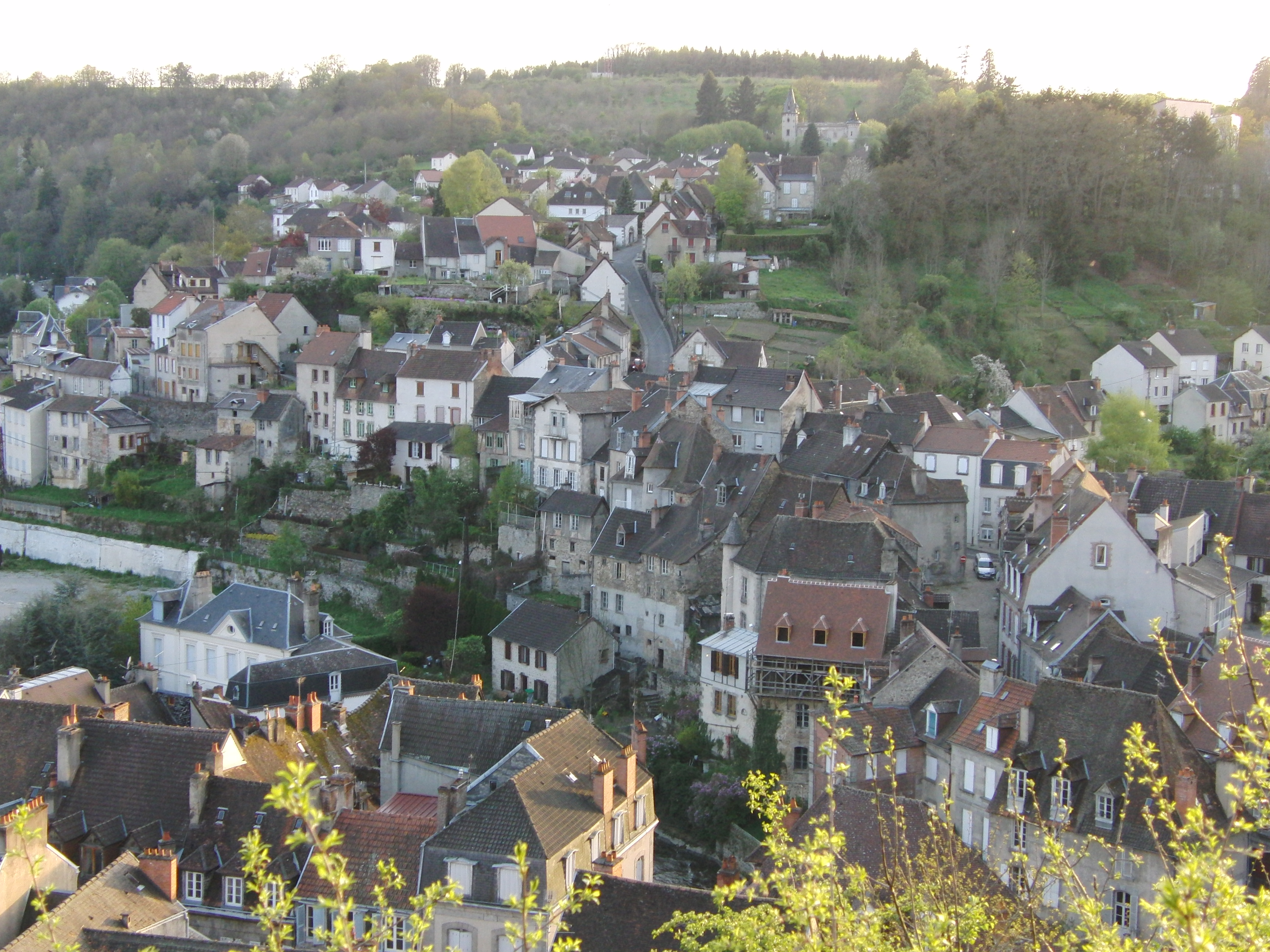
- A general view of Aubusson

- Coat of arms
- Location of Aubusson
- Location within France Location within Nouvelle-Aquitaine
- Coordinates: 45°57′25″N 2°10′06″E
- Country: France
- Region: Nouvelle-Aquitaine
- Department: Creuse
- Arrondissement: Aubusson
- Canton: Aubusson
- Intercommunality: CC Creuse Grand Sud

Government
  - Mayor (2023–2026): Stéphane Ducourtioux
- Area^{1}: 19.21 km^{2} (7.42 sq mi)
- Elevation: 512 m (1,680 ft)
- Highest elevation: 608 m (1,995 ft)
- Lowest elevation: 416 m (1,365 ft)
- Population (2023): 3,018
  - Density: 157.1/km^{2} (406.9/sq mi)
- Time zone: UTC+01:00 (CET)
  - Summer (DST): UTC+02:00 (CEST)
- INSEE/Postal code: 23008 /23200
- ^{1} French Land Register data, which excludes lakes, ponds, glaciers > 1 km^{2} (0.386 sq mi or 247 acres) and river estuaries.

Aubusson (French pronunciation: [obysɔ̃]; Occitan auvergnat: Le Buçon, formerly Aubuçon) is a commune in the Creuse department region in central France.

== Geography ==
Aubusson is situated in the southern part of the département, at the confluence of the rivers Creuse and Beauze. The route nationale N141 goes through the town.

== History ==
Local lore previously held that the community was settled by defeated Berbers following the 8th-century Battle of Tours, but it is now established that Aubusson has existed at least since the Gallo-Roman period. The Camp des Châtres, within the town's boundaries, for a long time considered a Roman fort, actually dates back a little further, to the Iron Age.

The town was known as Albuciensis in 936 and under the name Albuconis in 1070. The name possibly originates from the name of a man, Albucius Other scholars claim the name is from a Celtic word meaning craggy. In the Middle Ages the town was ruled by viscounts. The vicecomital family also produced a troubadour named Joan d'Aubusson.

== Tapestry ==
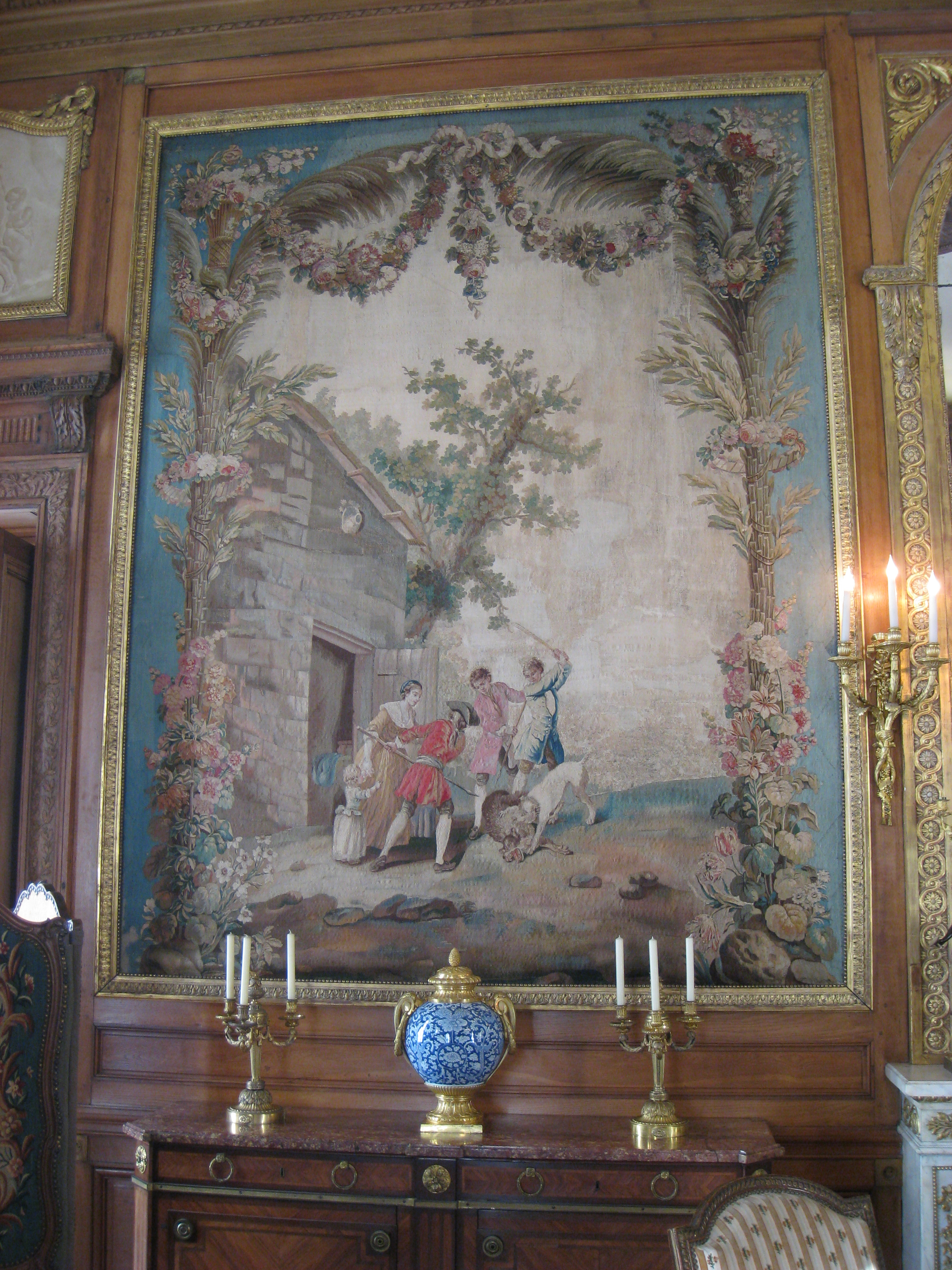
Aubusson tapestry in the Musée Nissim de Camondo, Paris

Aubusson is well known for its tapestry and carpets, which have been famous throughout the world since the 14th century. The origins of this craft date to the arrival of weavers from Flanders, who took refuge in Aubusson around 1580. There is a famous collection of Aubusson tapestries at Vallon-Pont-d'Arc. The style of the tapestries produced has changed through the centuries, from scenes of green landscapes through to hunting scenes.

In the 17th century, the Aubusson and Felletin workshops were given "Royal Appointment" status. A downturn in fortunes came after the French Revolution and the arrival of wallpaper. However, tapestry made something of a comeback during the 1930s, with artists such as Cocteau, Dufy, Dali, Braque, Calder and Picasso being invited to Aubusson to express themselves through the medium of wool. Aubusson tapestry still thrives today, preserving a range of traditional skills. In 1983, l’Atelier Raymond Picaud chose Burhan Doğançay's Ribbon Series as a tapestry subject. Coventry cathedral's famous Christ in Glory tapestry, designed by artist Graham Sutherland, was woven in nearby Felletin. Installed in 1962, this was the world's largest vertical tapestry up until the 1990s.

== Population ==
Historical population

Year	Pop.	±% p.a.
1793	4,445	—
1800	3,460	−3.52%
1806	3,818	+1.65%
1821	4,251	+0.72%
1831	4,847	+1.32%
1836	5,631	+3.04%
1841	5,092	−1.99%
1846	5,436	+1.32%
1851	5,666	+0.83%
1856	6,061	+1.36%
1861	6,003	−0.19%
1866	6,625	+1.99%
1872	6,427	−0.50%
1876	6,847	+1.60%
1881	6,782	−0.19%
1886	6,723	−0.17%
1891	6,672	−0.15%
1896	6,671	−0.00%
1901	7,067	+1.16%

Year	Pop.	±% p.a.
1906	7,015	−0.15%
1911	7,211	+0.55%
1921	6,485	−1.06%
1926	6,324	−0.50%
1931	6,078	−0.79%
1936	5,830	−0.83%
1946	5,512	−0.56%
1954	5,595	+0.19%
1962	5,669	+0.16%
1968	5,934	+0.76%
1975	6,227	+0.69%
1982	5,710	−1.23%
1990	5,097	−1.41%
1999	4,662	−0.99%
2007	4,181	−1.35%
2012	3,699	−2.42%
2017	3,366	−1.87%
2023	3,018	−1.80%

Source: EHESS and INSEE (1968–2023)

== Sights ==
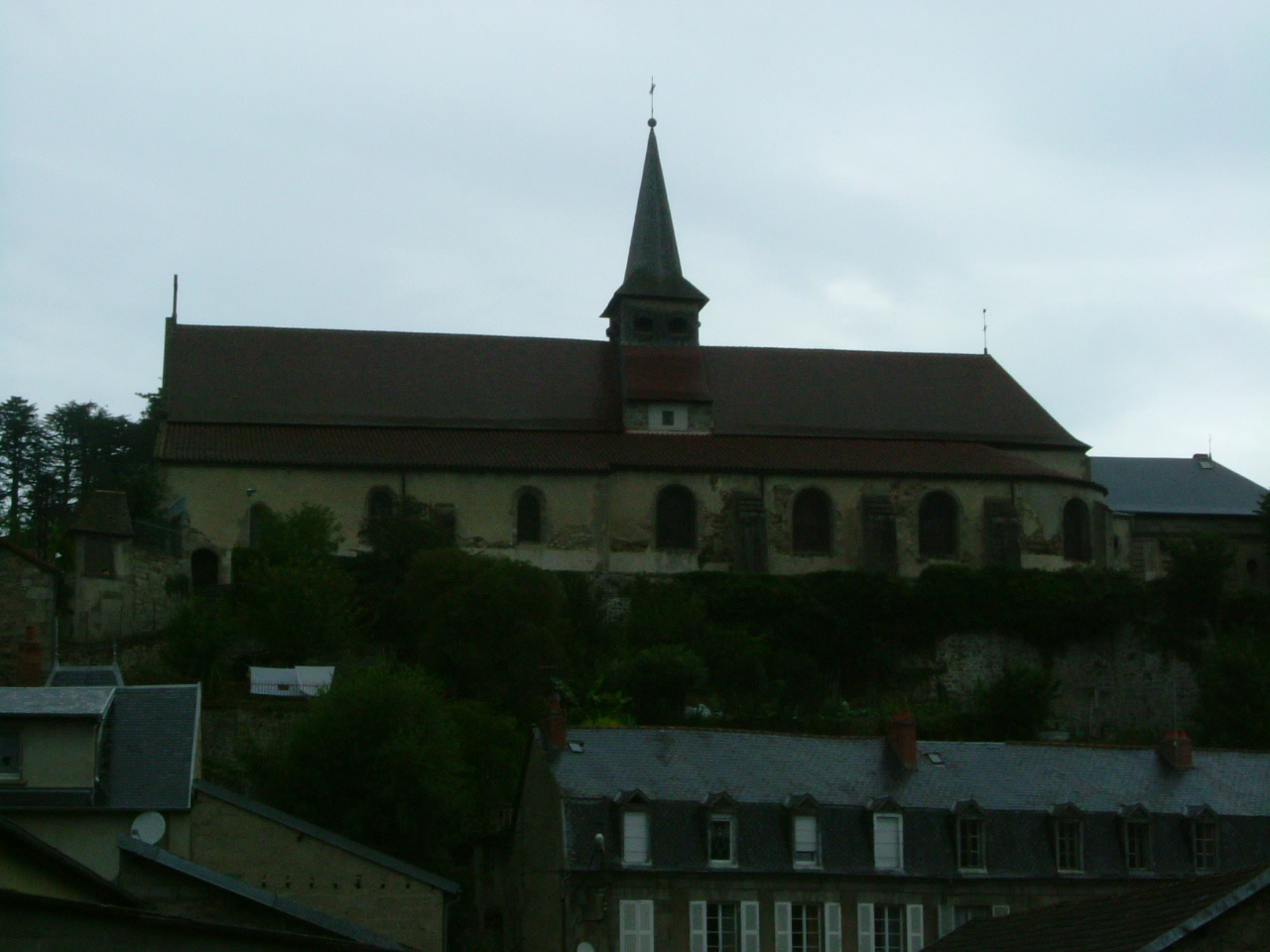
The church at Aubusson.

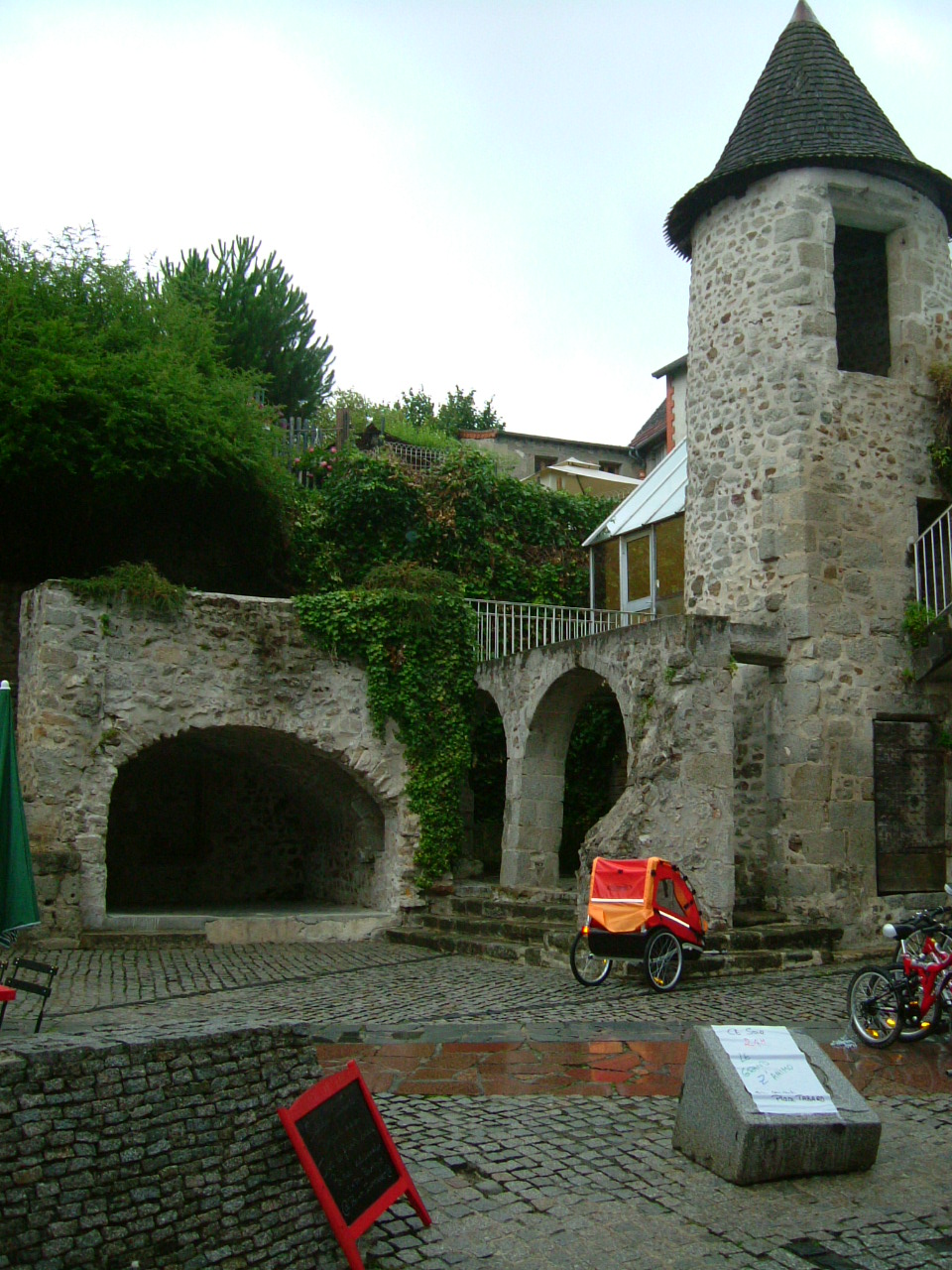
Tabard square, Aubusson.

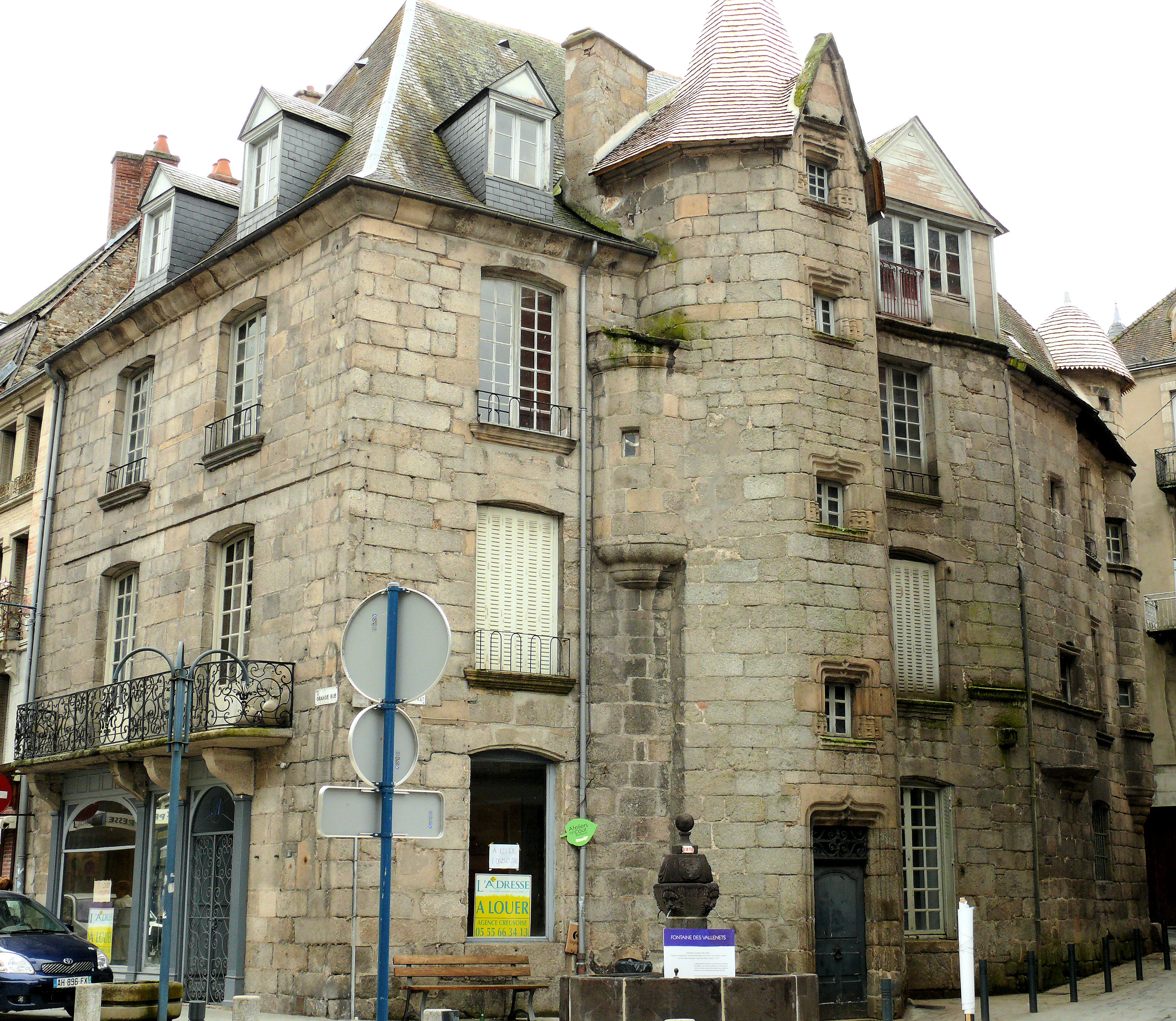
The Vallenet House, Aubusson

=== Musée Départemental de la Tapisserie ===
Created in 1981, the museum exhibits nearly 600 years of tapestry creation and production. This rich collection is composed of 17th, 18th and 19th century tapestries and carpets. As well as works from the museum's own collection, there are also regular exhibitions of tapestries from around the world, showcasing works right up to the present day.

=== Maison du Tapissier ===
This is a permanent exhibition that is held in an ancient Creusois house in Aubusson. The interior tells the history and traditions of tapestry as well as showing furniture of the period.

=== Historical buildings ===
- The Clock Tower
- The old town (ancient buildings)
- Sainte-Croix church
- Ruins of the chateau (also called le Chapitre)
- The Vallenet House

== Rulers ==
In the medieval period, Aubusson was a vicomté (fr) which is similar to the English vice-county. Its rulers were:

- Ranulf I ?-934
- Robert I 934-942
- Renaud I 942-958 (son of Ranulf I)
- Ranulf II Cabridel 958-1031
- Ranulf III 1031-1060
- Renaud III 1060-1069
- William I 1069-1106
- Renaud IV 1106-?
- Renaud V The Leper ?-1185
- Guy I 1185- ?
- Renaud VI ?-1249
- Ranulf V 1249-c. 1265
- William II (heir) 1263, lord of La Borne, La Feuillade, Monteil-au-Vicomte, Poux, Pintarion and Damoiseau (1317), started a noble line that continued with his son Renaud VIII (1317–1353) and his successors.

Around 1263/1266 the vice-county was sold to the count of La Marche.

== Notable people ==
- Jules Sandeau (1811–1883), member of the Académie française
- André Jorrand (1921–2007), composer and organist
- André Chandernagor (1921–2025), politician

== International relations ==
Aubusson is twinned with:

- Eguisheim, France
- Assen, Netherlands

== Climate ==
Climate data for Aubusson (1991–2020 normals, extremes 1991–present)
Month	Jan	Feb	Mar	Apr	May	Jun	Jul	Aug	Sep	Oct	Nov	Dec	Year
Record high °C (°F)	21.9 (71.4)	24.4 (75.9)	26.4 (79.5)	28.6 (83.5)	32.3 (90.1)	38.3 (100.9)	39.6 (103.3)	39.7 (103.5)	37.2 (99.0)	34.0 (93.2)	26.4 (79.5)	19.7 (67.5)	39.7 (103.5)
Mean daily maximum °C (°F)	7.4 (45.3)	8.5 (47.3)	12.3 (54.1)	15.1 (59.2)	19.0 (66.2)	22.7 (72.9)	25.0 (77.0)	25.2 (77.4)	21.2 (70.2)	16.8 (62.2)	11.2 (52.2)	8.0 (46.4)	16.0 (60.8)
Daily mean °C (°F)	3.1 (37.6)	3.4 (38.1)	6.3 (43.3)	8.7 (47.7)	12.4 (54.3)	16.0 (60.8)	17.9 (64.2)	17.8 (64.0)	14.1 (57.4)	11.0 (51.8)	6.4 (43.5)	3.7 (38.7)	10.1 (50.2)
Mean daily minimum °C (°F)	−1.2 (29.8)	−1.7 (28.9)	0.2 (32.4)	2.2 (36.0)	5.8 (42.4)	9.3 (48.7)	10.8 (51.4)	10.4 (50.7)	7.0 (44.6)	5.2 (41.4)	1.5 (34.7)	−0.6 (30.9)	4.1 (39.4)
Record low °C (°F)	−16.1 (3.0)	−20.5 (−4.9)	−21.0 (−5.8)	−8.2 (17.2)	−2.8 (27.0)	−0.8 (30.6)	2.0 (35.6)	−0.1 (31.8)	−3.0 (26.6)	−9.6 (14.7)	−14.0 (6.8)	−16.0 (3.2)	−21.0 (−5.8)
Average precipitation mm (inches)	73.4 (2.89)	65.8 (2.59)	67.2 (2.65)	87.2 (3.43)	91.2 (3.59)	85.9 (3.38)	76.5 (3.01)	76.0 (2.99)	77.2 (3.04)	73.4 (2.89)	83.9 (3.30)	81.4 (3.20)	939.1 (36.97)
Average precipitation days (≥ 1.0 mm)	12.9	11.7	11.2	12.4	12.4	9.9	8.9	8.9	9.3	11.2	12.9	13.0	134.7
Source: Meteociel

== See also ==
- Communes of the Creuse département
