= Saint-Priest =

Saint Priest or Saint-Priest may refer to:

== People ==
- Praejectus (625–676), bishop of Clermont
- François-Emmanuel Guignard, comte de Saint-Priest (1735–1821), French politician and diplomat
- Guillaume Emmanuel Guignard, vicomte de Saint-Priest (1776–1814), French-born general who fought in the Russian army
- Armand Charles Emmanuel Guignard, comte de Saint-Priest (1782–1863), French aristocrat
- Alexis Guignard, comte de Saint-Priest (1805–1851), French diplomat and historian
- Emmanuel Louis Marie Guignard, vicomte de Saint-Priest (1789–1881), French politician and diplomat

== Places ==
Saint-Priest is the name or part of the name of several communes in France:

- Saint-Priest, Metropolis of Lyon
- Saint-Priest, Ardèche
- Saint-Priest, Creuse
- Saint-Priest-Bramefant, in the Puy-de-Dôme department
- Saint-Priest-d'Andelot, in the Allier department
- Saint-Priest-de-Gimel, in the Corrèze department
- Saint-Priest-des-Champs, in the Puy-de-Dôme department
- Saint-Priest-en-Jarez, in the Loire department
- Saint-Priest-en-Murat, in the Allier department
- Saint-Priest-la-Feuille, in the Creuse department
- Saint-Priest-la-Marche, in the Cher department
- Saint-Priest-la-Plaine, in the Creuse department
- Saint-Priest-la-Prugne, in the Loire department
- Saint-Priest-la-Roche, in the Loire department
- Saint-Priest-la-Vêtre, in the Loire department
- Saint-Priest-les-Fougères, in the Dordogne department
- Saint-Priest-Ligoure, in the Haute-Vienne department
- Saint-Priest-Palus, in the Creuse department
- Saint-Priest-sous-Aixe, in the Haute-Vienne department
- Saint-Priest-Taurion, in the Haute-Vienne department

== Sports ==
- AS Saint-Priest, French football team
