= Guignard =

Guignard is a surname. Notable people with the surname include:

- Alberto da Veiga Guignard (1896–1962), Brazilian artist
- Alexis Guignard, comte de Saint-Priest (1805–1851), French diplomat and historian
- André Guignard, Swiss engineer initially educated as a watchmaker
- Armand Charles Emmanuel Guignard, comte de Saint-Priest (1782–1863), French aristocrat
- Charlène Guignard (born 1989), French-Italian ice dancer
- Christelle Guignard (born 1962), retired French alpine skier
- Emmanuel Louis Marie Guignard, vicomte de Saint-Priest (1789–1881), French politician and diplomat during the Bourbon Restoration
- Eric J. Guignard (born 1975), American author, anthologist, and publisher
- François-Emmanuel Guignard, comte de Saint-Priest (1735–1821), French politician and diplomat during the Ancien Régime and French Revolution
- Guillaume Emmanuel Guignard, vicomte de Saint-Priest (1776–1814), French émigré general who fought in the Russian army
- Jane Bruce Guignard (1876–1963), American physician, suffragist
- Léon Guignard (1852–1928), French botanist and pharmacist
- Jazz Guignard, popular Haitian jazz musician in the 1930s

== See also ==
- Château Lamothe-Guignard, sweet white wine
- Guignard University of Art of Minas Gerais, university of fine arts in Brazil
- Gruinard Island, an island of the Inner Hebrides in northwestern Scotland
