= Ulrica Eleonora Rålamb =

Swedish countess and socialite

Ulrica Eleonora Rålamb (née von Düben; 19 August 1769 – 9 February 1847) was a politically active Swedish countess and socialite.

She was born to count Carl Wilhelm von Düben and Ulrica von Düben. She came from a family of courtiers, being related to Emerentia von Düben, Fredrika Eleonora von Düben and Ulrika Eleonora von Düben. Prior to her marriage, she served as hovfröken (Maid of honour) to the royal duchess Charlotte. In 1794, she married the courtier baron Claes Rålamb (1750–1826). As was customary in the Swedish nobility at the time when a female married a male with a lower title, she took her husband's last name, but kept her own title, as countess was a higher title than baroness, and became known as countess Rålamb even though her husband was still baron Rålamb. She had one son and two daughters, one of whom was Clara Bonde.

Ulrica Eleonora Rålamb was described as an intelligent beauty interested in politics and became a leading member of Stockholm high society after her marriage. Known for her interest in state affairs, she was on several occasions suspected to be involved in various plots and intrigues. In 1795, duchess Charlotte mention her in her famous diary as a suspected agent for the Russian Empire. According to the rumor, Rålamb was the lover of count Carl Mörner, who had a central position at the royal court and well informed about classified state secrets. In parallel, she was also a close acquaintance of the French émigré François-Emmanuel Guignard, comte de Saint-Priest, spouse of Constance Wilhelmine de Saint-Priest, who was well known to be a Russian agent in Sweden. According to the information of Charlotte, Rålamb acquired classified information from the well informed Mörner, and in turn gave the information to Saint Priest, who sent it to Platon Zubov, the favorite of Catherine the Great, in Russia. Rålamb was never officially charged with spying, however.

Ulrica Eleonora Rålamb was known to belong to the advisories of Gustav IV Adolf of Sweden and hosted the opposition of the monarch in her salon. Before and during the deposition of Gustav IV Adolf of Sweden during the Coup of 1809, numerous libelous pamphlets caricatured politically active people in the capital. One of them caricatured different political actors by a list giving them subscriptions to various plays. Rålamb was on the list and subscribed the play Intrigerna i fönsterna (Intrigues in the windows).

In March 1812, Ulrica Eleonora Rålamb was again suspected for a political plot. The spy of Crown Prince Charles John, Mazér, reported that a plot was prepared to assassinate the crown prince and his son Oscar on the night of 13–14 March. Mazér was given this information from the pub owner Jan Lindbom, who was questioned. Lindbom referred to courtier baron Klinckowström, who in turn claimed that plots were prepared by the opposition in the house of countess Rålamb, implicating several people at court, such as count De la Gardie and the Maître d'hôtel of the royal court Holmgren. This, in turn, implicated queen Charlotte because of her close affiliation to Holmgren – and, though they were not personal friends, Rålamb had previously been her maid of honor. The whole affair was eventually deemed to be fictitious or in any case not worthy of a serious investigation, but it did damage the confidence between the queen and the crown prince.

Rålamb died in Strängnäs.
