= Senoueix Bridge =

Bridge in France

Coordinates: 45°49′3.4″N 1°59′47.3″E

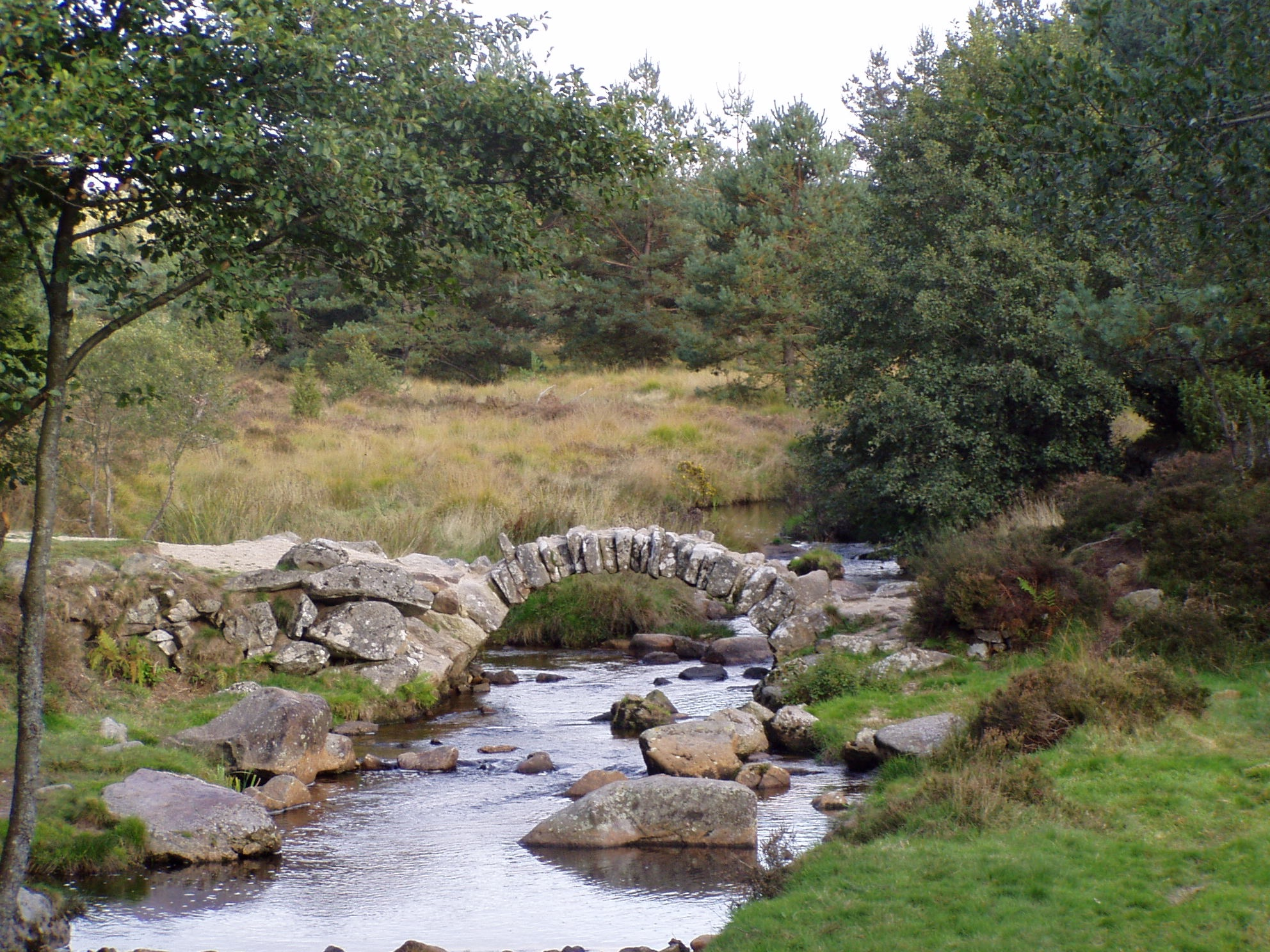
Pont de Senoueix

The Senoueix bridge is a small arch of stones, which are the remains of a bridge. It is also sometimes known under the name: "the Roman bridge", but its Roman origin is doubtful. It was probably built in the 17th century. A bridge might have been built during the Roman era but the bridge that can be seen now is much more recent.

The bridge is located on the Gentioux-Pigerolles communal territory, five kilometers north, on the road to Saint-Marc-à-Loubaud. The bridge crosses the Taurion river. It belongs to the "Plateau de Millevaches" region, in the south of Creuse.

== Architecture ==
Only one arch remains; the cause of the destruction of the rest of the bridge have not been determined.

The Senoueix Bridge is highly likely to have been built on a curve, based on the surfacing rock. It is 0.6 meters wide, 1.70 meters high and 3.4 meters long.

== Economy ==
In the past centuries, local peasants used to cross the Taurion using the Senoueix bridge in order to reach one of the water mills built along the river.

A new and wider road was built and then paved in the 20th century, with a bigger and stronger bridge crossing the Thaurion, only 50 meters from the previous bridge. The water mills have been partly destroyed, and are now considered as romantic remains of the past.

The partial destruction of the bridge has not been dated, but probably happened prior to the 20th century.

== Agriculture ==
The moor landscape surrounding the bridge and the river is used to herd small groups of cattle during spring and summer time.

== Arts ==
=== Photographs ===
The bridge has been a subject for thousands of photographs for the past 50 years. Many tourists crossing the department of Creuse stop there to take a souvenir picture of the landmark.

Many postcards sold in the Limousin region feature the bridge as a charming and emblematic landmark.

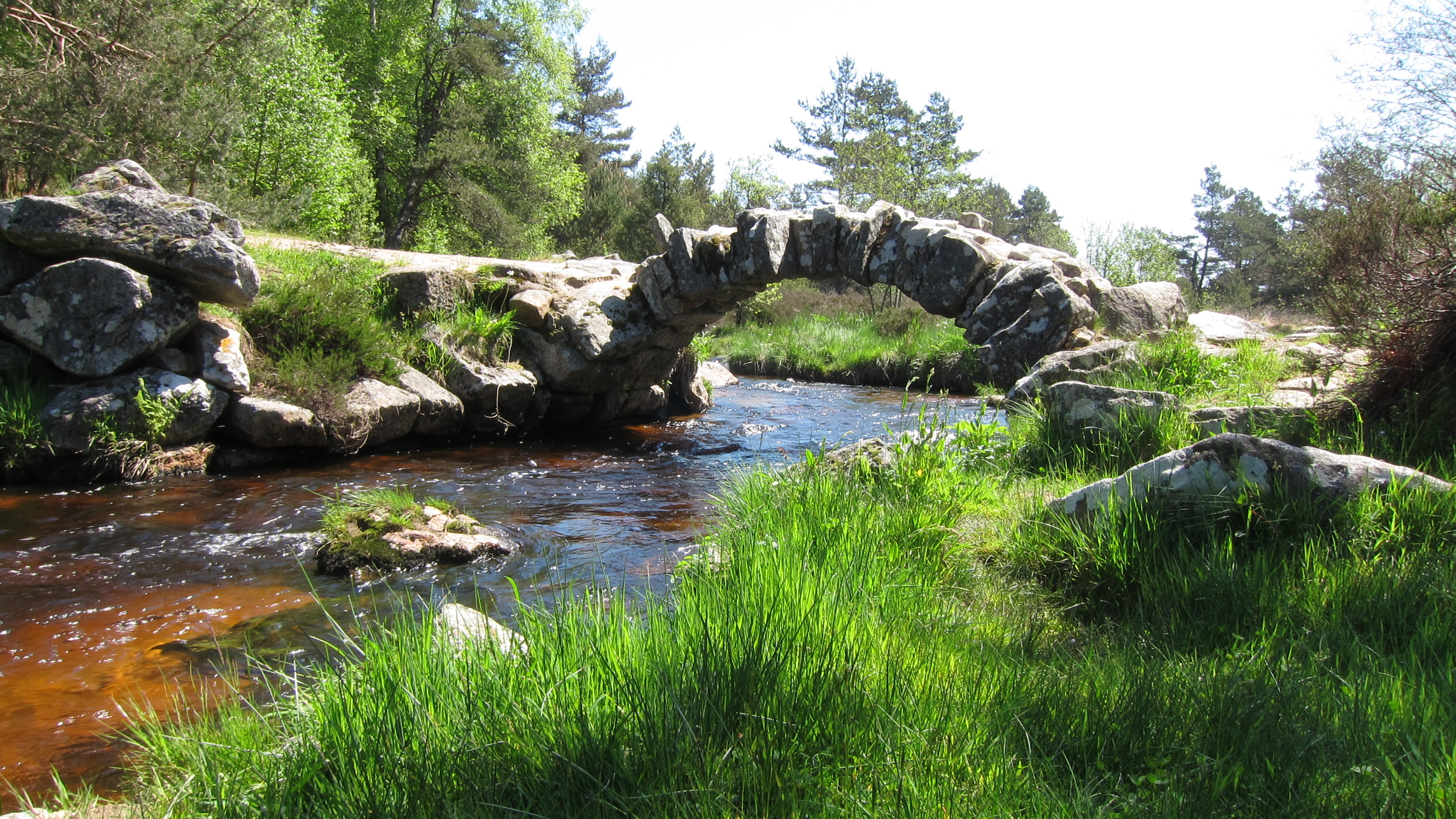
Pont du Thaurion near Senoueix in Creuse, France

=== Paintings ===
A few artists, inspired by the site, decided to paint the bridge and its environment. Among them, were Edith Messmer.

== Natural environment ==
The area belongs to the regional park of plateau de Millevaches. Millevaches can be directly translated to "Thousands cows" but the ancient Occitan refers to "vascas" as "sources" given the high number of river sources within the area.

=== Minerals ===
The lands surrounding the bridge are essentially bog and acidic ground, which allows only a particular type of vegetation to grow

Deeper underground is mostly granite as is the whole Southern area of Creuse.

=== Vegetation ===
Cultivated plants: Douglas belonging to the Douglas-fir family; épicéa belonging to Picea gender. Common plants: heather belonging to the family of Ericaceae.

== Life style ==
Since 1992, the "Senoueix Bridge Fest and Pastorale" has been held around mid August.
