= Louis Marie de Pons Saint-Maurice =

French diplomat

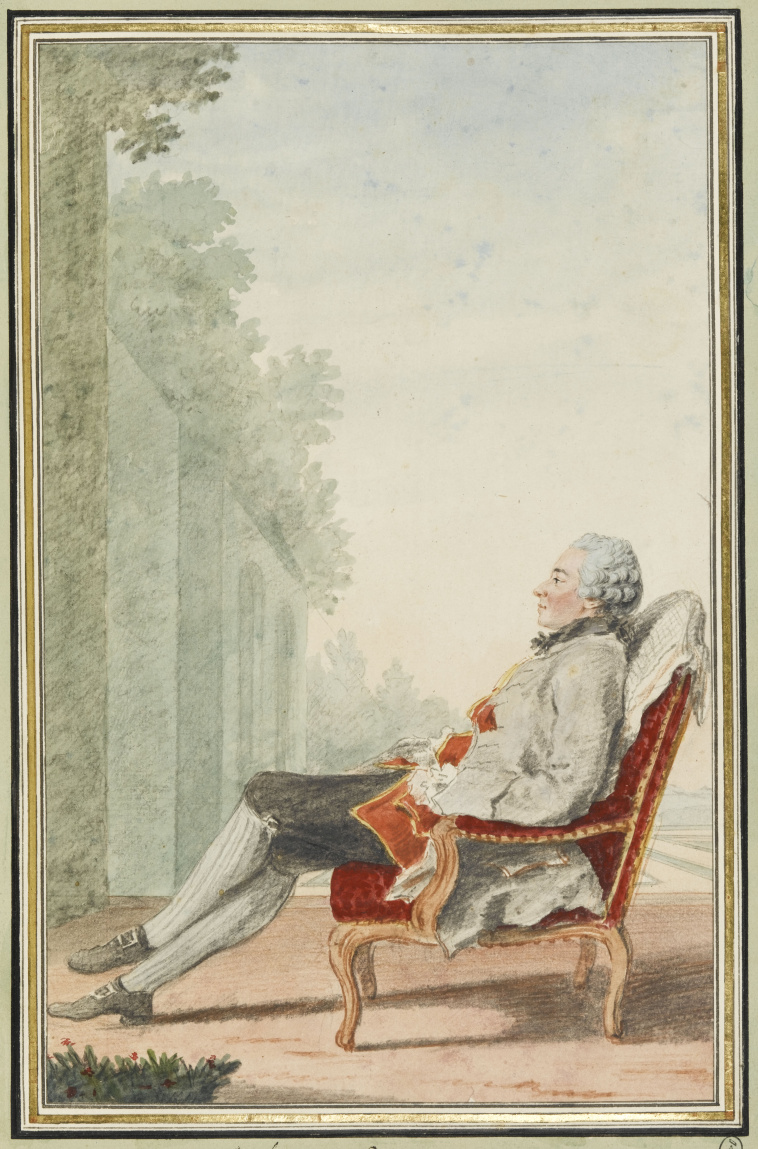
Portrait du marquis de Pons, by Carmontelle (musée Condé).

Louis Marie de Pons Saint-Maurice, born in 1739, was a French diplomat.

Grand-son of Michel Joseph Hyacinthe Lallemant de Betz (1684-1773) and Marie Marguerite Maillet de Batilly (1704-1762), and son of Marie-Charlotte Lallemant de Betz (1721-?) and Charles Philippe, comte de Pons (1709-1771), he was first aide-de-camp, then the ambassador of France in Berlin (1773), then in Stockholm from 1783 to 1789, and in Madrid in 1790.

He married in november 1763 Emmanuelle-Marie-Anne de Cossé-Brissac (1745-1796), and was the father of the politically active Camille du Bois de la Motte and five other children.

He wrote a travel journal in Italy, a Grand Tour (1790-1791).

Returned in Paris, he left no trace.
