= Taurion =

River in France

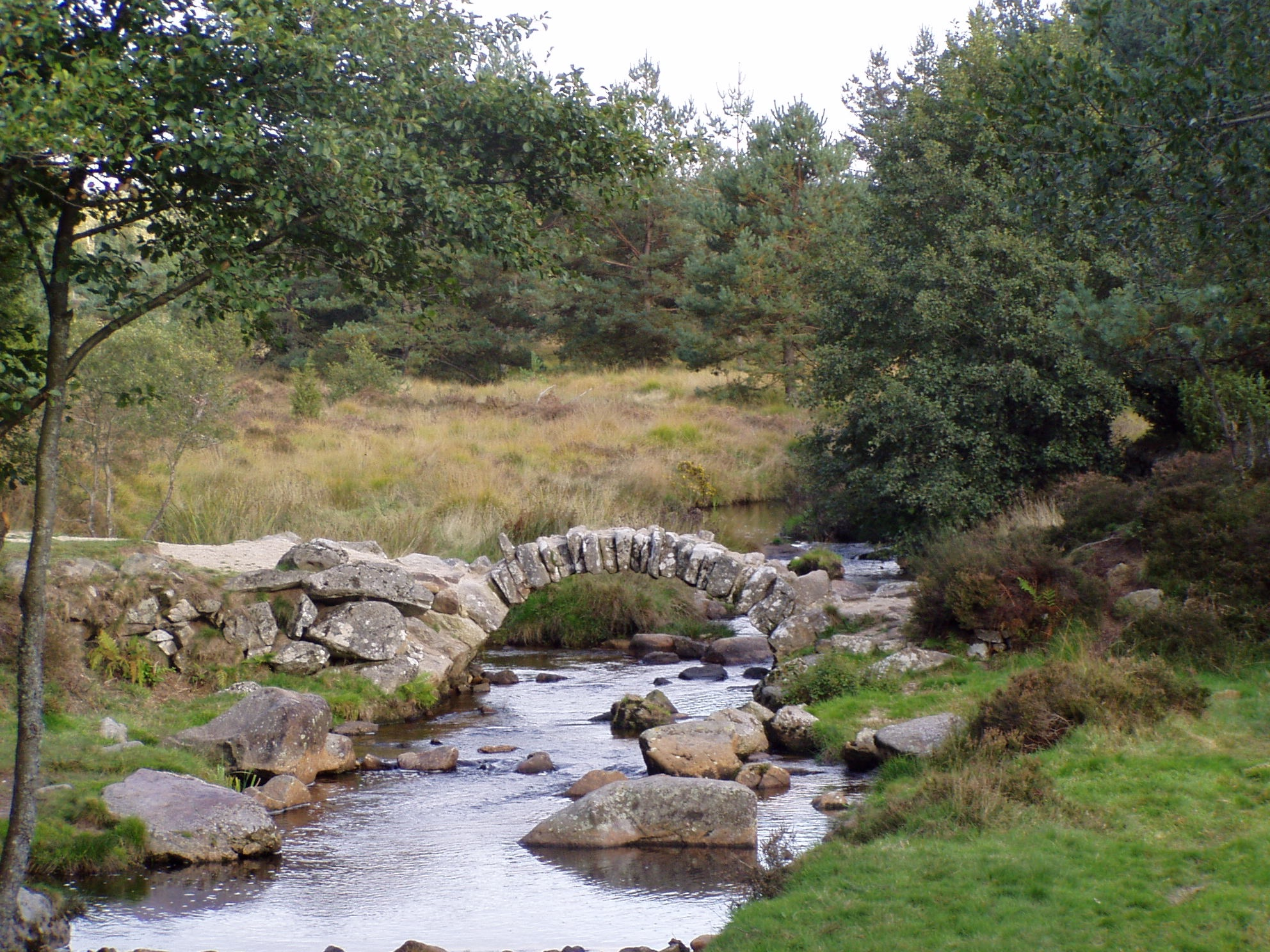

- Location within France Location within Nouvelle-Aquitaine

Location
- Country: France

Physical characteristics
- Source
  - location: Limousin
  - elevation: 785 m (2,575 ft)
- Mouth
  - location: Vienne
  - coordinates: 45°53′3″N 1°23′40″E
  - elevation: 232 m (761 ft)
- Length: 107.5 km (66.8 mi)
- Basin size: 1,030 km^{2} (400 sq mi)
- Discharge
  - average: 18.9 m^{3}/s (670 cu ft/s) at Saint-Priest-Taurion

Basin features
- Progression: Vienne→ Loire→ Atlantic Ocean

The Taurion (French pronunciation: [toʁjɔ̃]; Occitan: Taurion), as it is known in Haute-Vienne, or Thaurion, as it is known in Creuse, is a 107.5 km long river in western France, tributary of the Vienne river.

Its source is at an altitude of 785 m on the Plateau de Millevaches, on the flanks of the Puy de Groscher, near Gentioux in the commune of Gentioux-Pigerolles, in the Creuse département.

It passes under the bridge of Sénoueix, feeds the Lac de Lavaud-Gelade, and then crosses the Rigole du diable. It flows into the Vienne on the right bank at Saint-Priest-Taurion, at 232 m elevation. Hydro-electric dams are built along the river, (La Roche Talamy, l'Étroit, Saint-Marc, Chauvan).

The Taurion flows through the following départements and towns:

- Creuse: Gentioux-Pigerolles, Saint-Hilaire-le-Château, Pontarion, Bourganeuf
- Haute-Vienne: Saint-Priest-Taurion
