= Alexis Guignard, comte de Saint-Priest =

French diplomat and historian

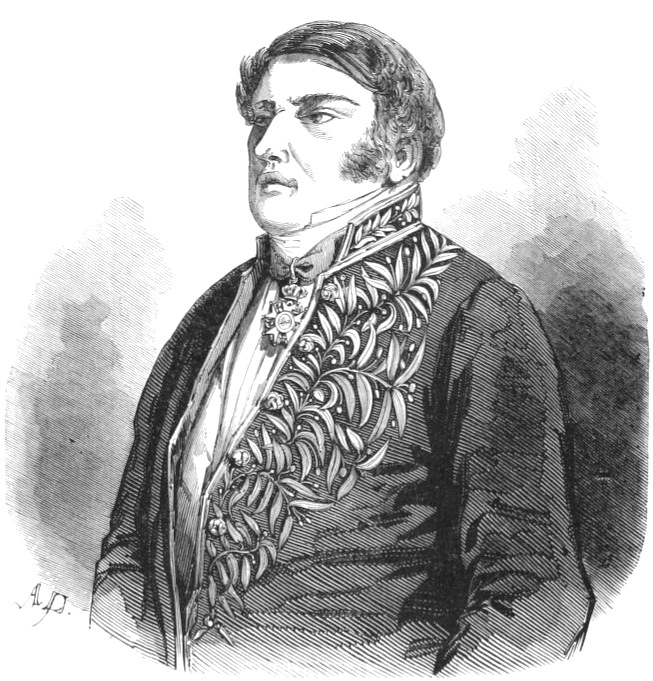
- Born: 27 April 1805; Saint Petersburg, Russian Empire
- Died: 29 September 1851 (aged 46); Moscow, Russian Empire
- Occupations: Diplomat and historian
- Title: Peer of France
- Parents: Armand Charles Emmanuel Guignard (father); Princess Sophie Galitzine (mother)
- Relatives: François-Emmanuel Guignard (grandfather)

Alexis Guignard, comte de Saint-Priest (27 April 1805 in Saint Petersburg – 29 September 1851 in Moscow) was a French diplomat, historian, and Peer of France. He was the eleventh member elected to occupy seat 4 of the Académie française in 1849.

Guignard was the son of an émigré French nobleman Armand Charles Emmanuel Guignard, comte de Saint-Priest (1782–1863) and his Russian wife, Princess Sophie Galitzine. His grandfather, François-Emmanuel Guignard, comte de Saint-Priest, was one of the last ministers of Louis XVI.

Educated in Russia, where his father was the Governor of Podolia and Odessa, Guignard returned to France with his father in 1822. During the July Monarchy, he departed from the Legitimist tradition of his family, particularly that of his uncle Emmanuel Louis Marie de Guignard, vicomte de Saint Priest, to become a warm friend to King Louis-Philippe of France, whom he served between 1833 and 1838 as an ambassador in Brazil, Portugal and Denmark.

In the 1840s, Guignard made his mark as a historian and writer. His most important works were the Histoire de la royauté considérée dans ses origines jusqu'à la formation des principales monarchies de l'Europe (2 vols, 1842), the Histoire de la chute des Jésuites (1844) and the Histoire de la conquête de Naples (4 vols, 1847-1848).

Guignard died while on a visit to Moscow, on 29 September 1851.

== Works ==
- Les ruines françaises - poésies (1823)
- Athenaïs, ou le souvenir d'une femme - comédie (1826)
- Le présent et le passé - épître (1828)
- L'Espagne, fragments de voyage (1830)
- Histoire de la royauté considérée dans ses origines jusqu'à la formation des principales monarchies de l'Europe (2 vol., 1842)
- Histoire de la chute des Jésuites au XVIIIe siècle (1844)
- Histoire de la conquête de Naples par Charles d'Anjou 4 vol. (1847)
- Études diplomatiques et littéraires (2 vol., 1850)

== Bibliography ==
- "Le comte Alexis de Saint-Priest". Revue des deux mondes (in French). 1852. This obituary by Albert de Broglie is available through Gallica, Bibliothèque nationale de France
- "Alexis Guignard de Saint-Priest (1805-1851)" (in French). Académie française. 2009.
