= Gentioux-Pigerolles =

Commune in Nouvelle-Aquitaine, France

- Commune
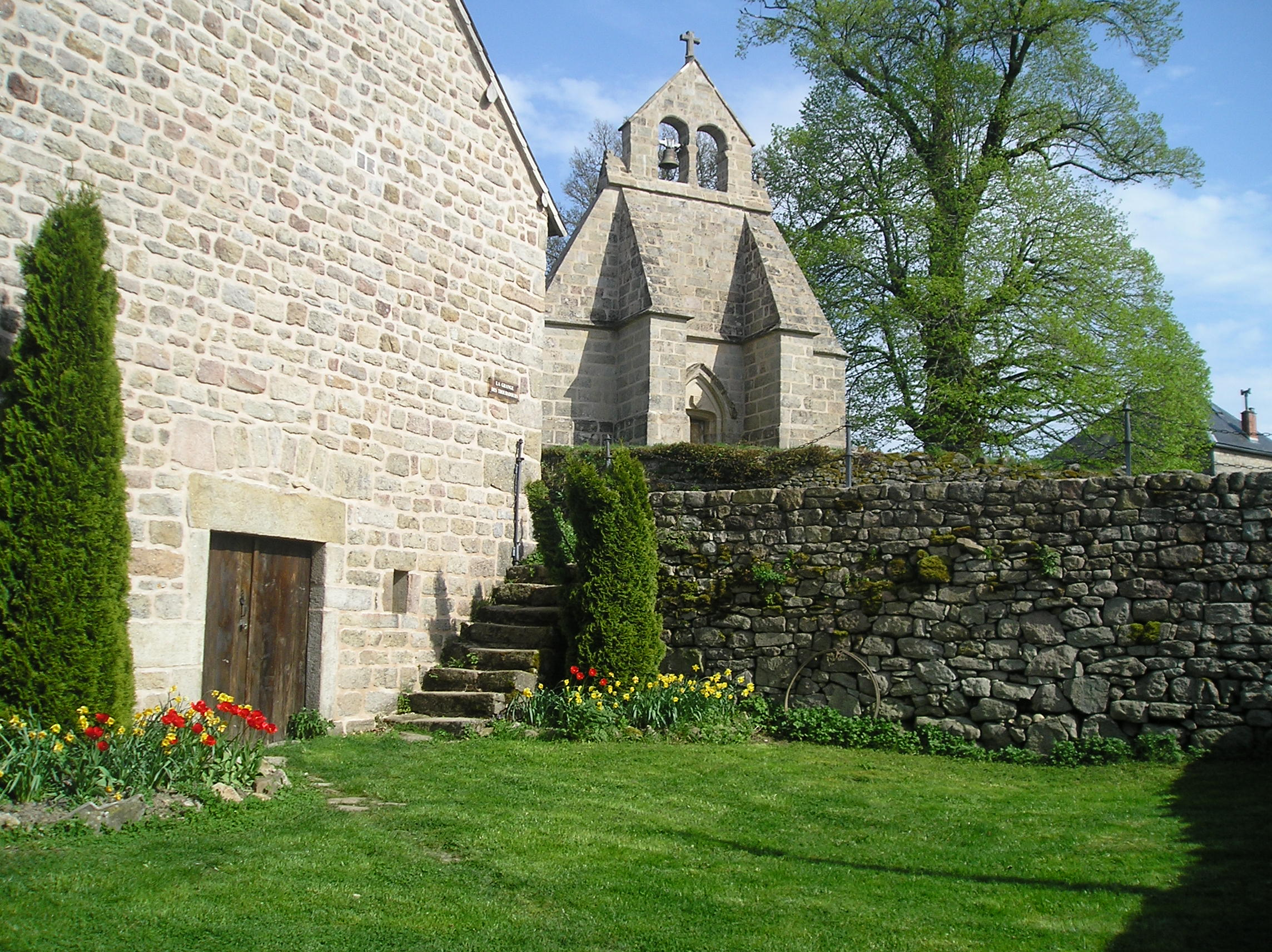
- The church seen from behind the Royal Notary hotel

- Coat of arms
- Location of Gentioux-Pigerolles
- Location within France Location within Nouvelle-Aquitaine
- Coordinates: 45°47′07″N 1°59′42″E
- Country: France
- Region: Nouvelle-Aquitaine
- Department: Creuse
- Arrondissement: Aubusson
- Canton: Felletin
- Intercommunality: CC Creuse Grand Sud

Government
  - Mayor (2021–2026): Benjamin Simons
- Area^{1}: 79.29 km^{2} (30.61 sq mi)
- Elevation: 800 m (2,600 ft)
- Highest elevation: 929 m (3,048 ft)
- Lowest elevation: 653 m (2,142 ft)
- Population (2023): 398
  - Density: 5.02/km^{2} (13.0/sq mi)
- Time zone: UTC+01:00 (CET)
  - Summer (DST): UTC+02:00 (CEST)
- INSEE/Postal code: 23090 /23340
- ^{1} French Land Register data, which excludes lakes, ponds, glaciers > 1 km^{2} (0.386 sq mi or 247 acres) and river estuaries.

Gentioux-Pigerolles (French pronunciation: [ʒãsju piʒʁɔl]; Occitan: Genciòus) is a commune in the Creuse department in the Nouvelle-Aquitaine region in central France.

== Geography ==
An area of lakes, forestry, quarries and farming, comprising three villages and several hamlets situated in the upper valleys of both the Maulde and Thaurion rivers, some 15 miles (24 km) southwest of Aubusson, at the junction of the D8, D992, D35 and the D16 roads. The commune is in the national park of the Millevaches (1000 lakes, not cows).

== Population ==
Historical population
Year	Pop.	±% p.a.
1968	535	—
1975	419	−3.43%
1982	371	−1.72%
1990	367	−0.14%
1999	389	+0.65%
2007	376	−0.42%
2012	397	+1.09%
2017	405	+0.40%
2023	398	−0.29%
Source: INSEE

== Sights ==
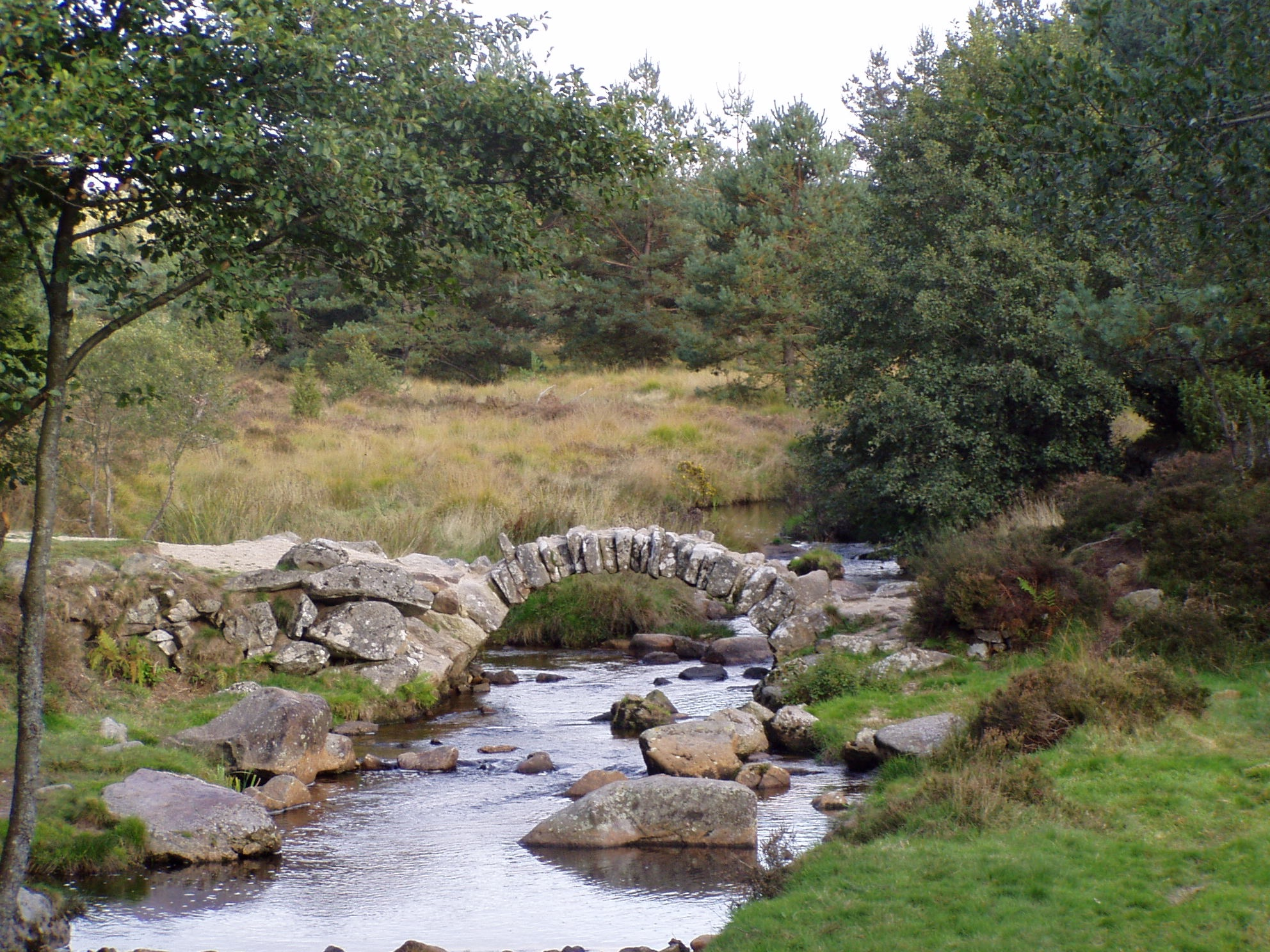
The Roman bridge - Pont de Senoueix

- The three 12th-century churches at Gentioux, Pallier and Pigerolles.
- A dolmen.
- A Roman bridge over the Thaurion at Senoueix.

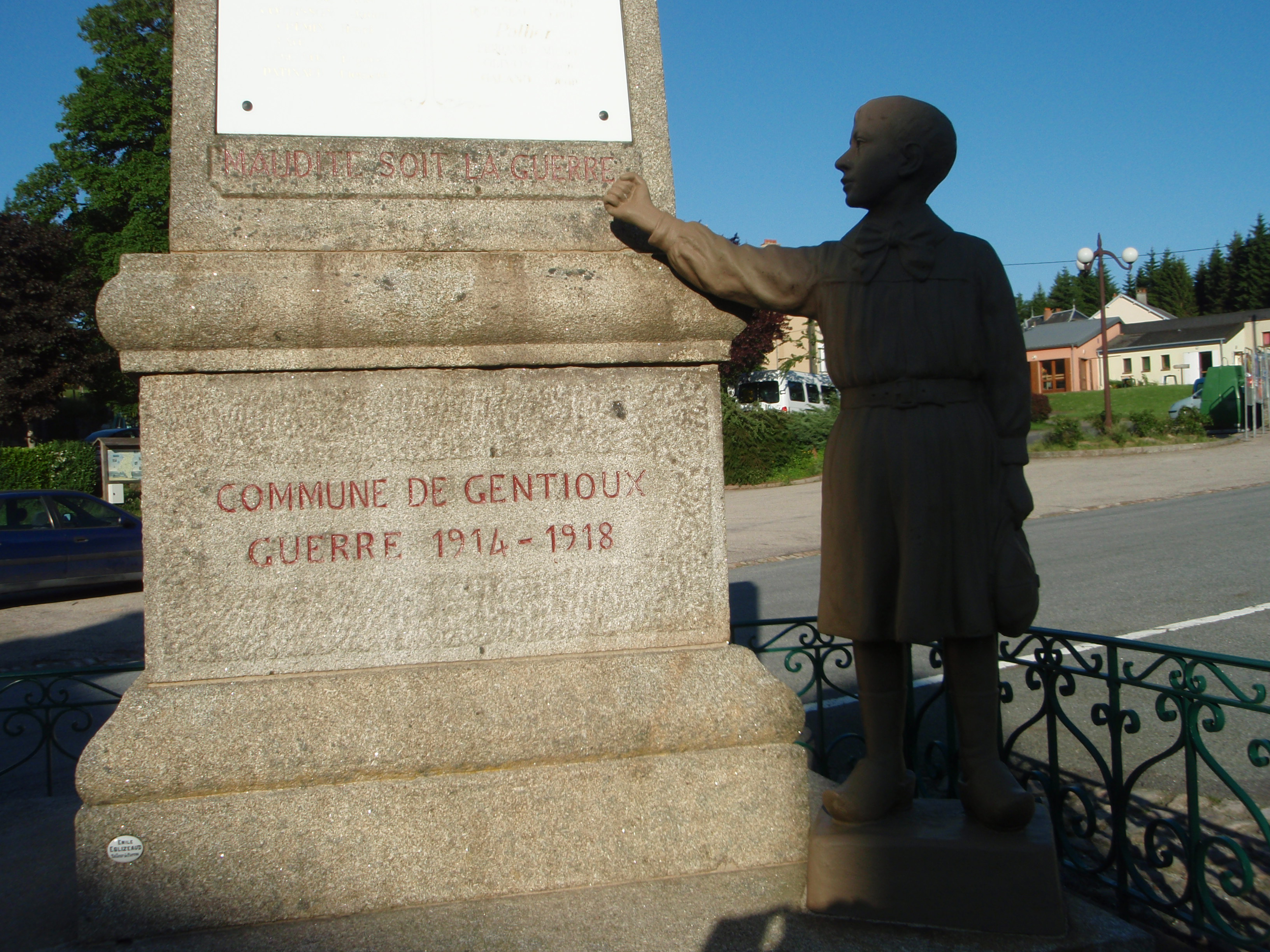
War memorial.

- War memorial: after World War I, some towns in France set up pacifist war memorials. Instead of commemorating the glorious dead, these memorials denounce war with figures of grieving widows and children rather than soldiers. Such memorials provoked anger among veterans and the military in general. The most famous one is located in Gentioux. Below the column which lists the name of the fallen, stands an orphan in bronze pointing to an inscription ‘Maudite soit la guerre’ (war be damned). Feelings ran so high that the memorial was not officially inaugurated until 1990 and soldiers at the nearby army camp were under orders to turn their heads when they walked past.
- An 18th-century house at Pallier, once owned by the notary royal.
- The chapel of Villemoneix, dating from the 18th century.

== Gallery ==
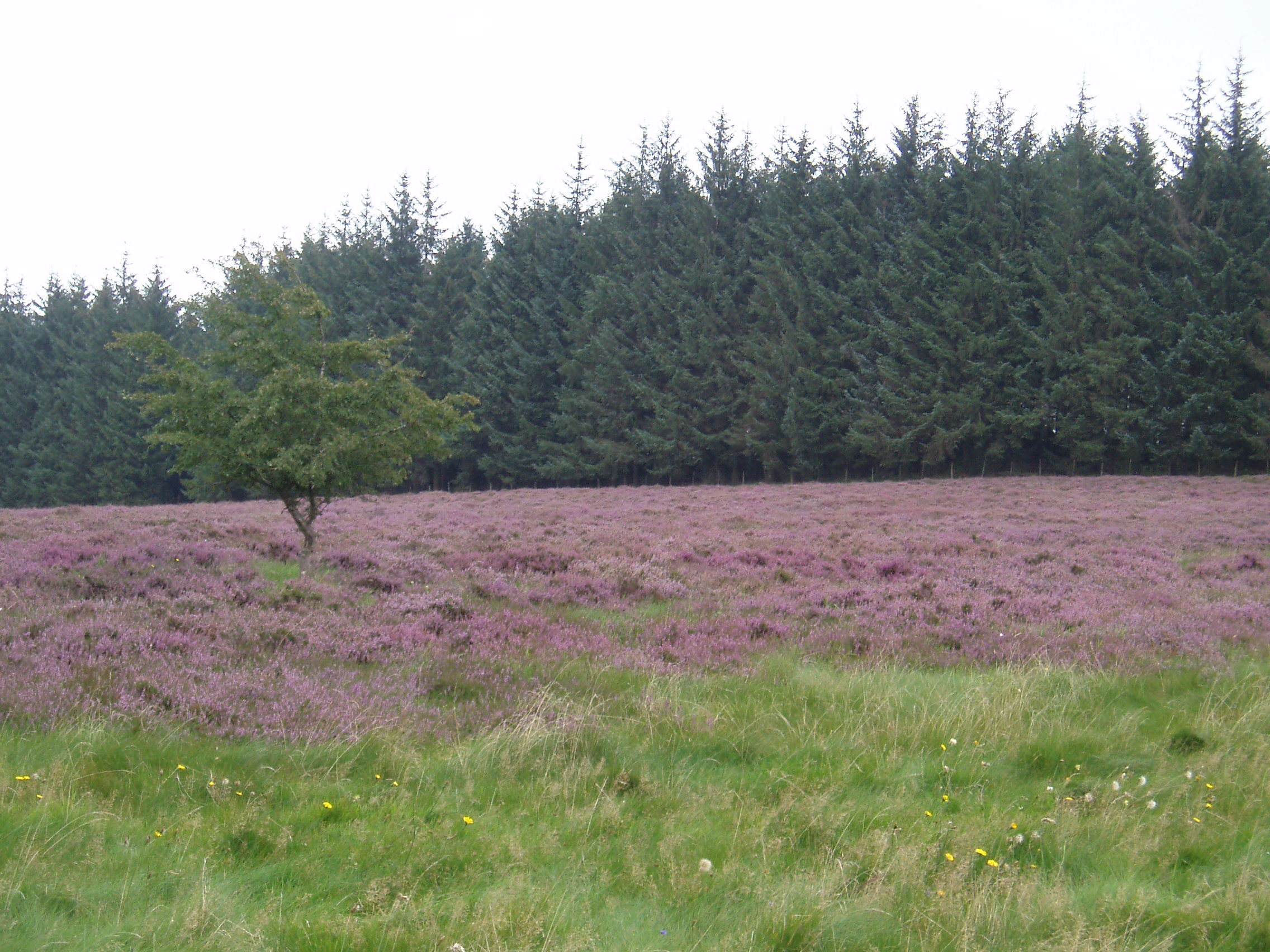

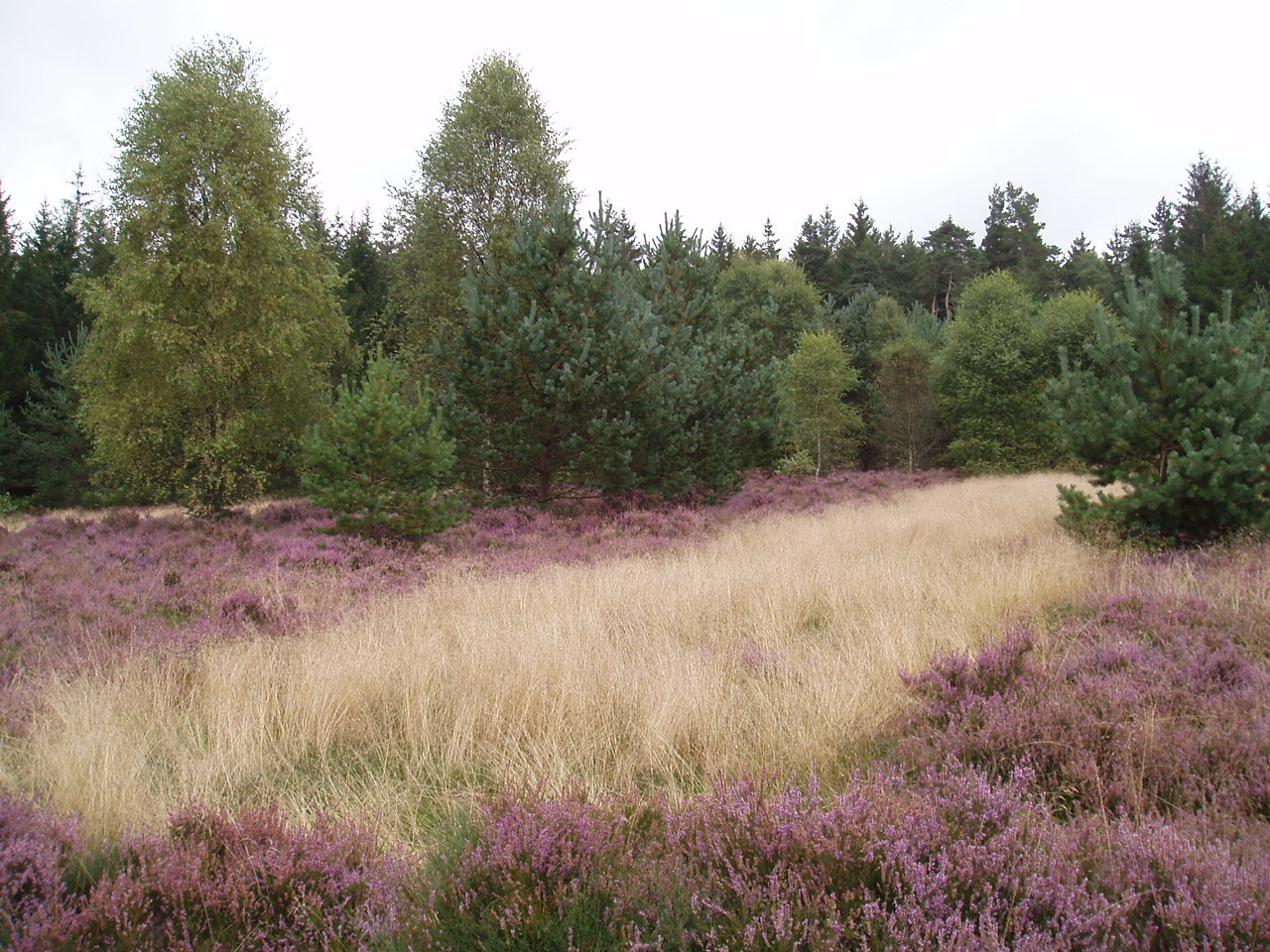

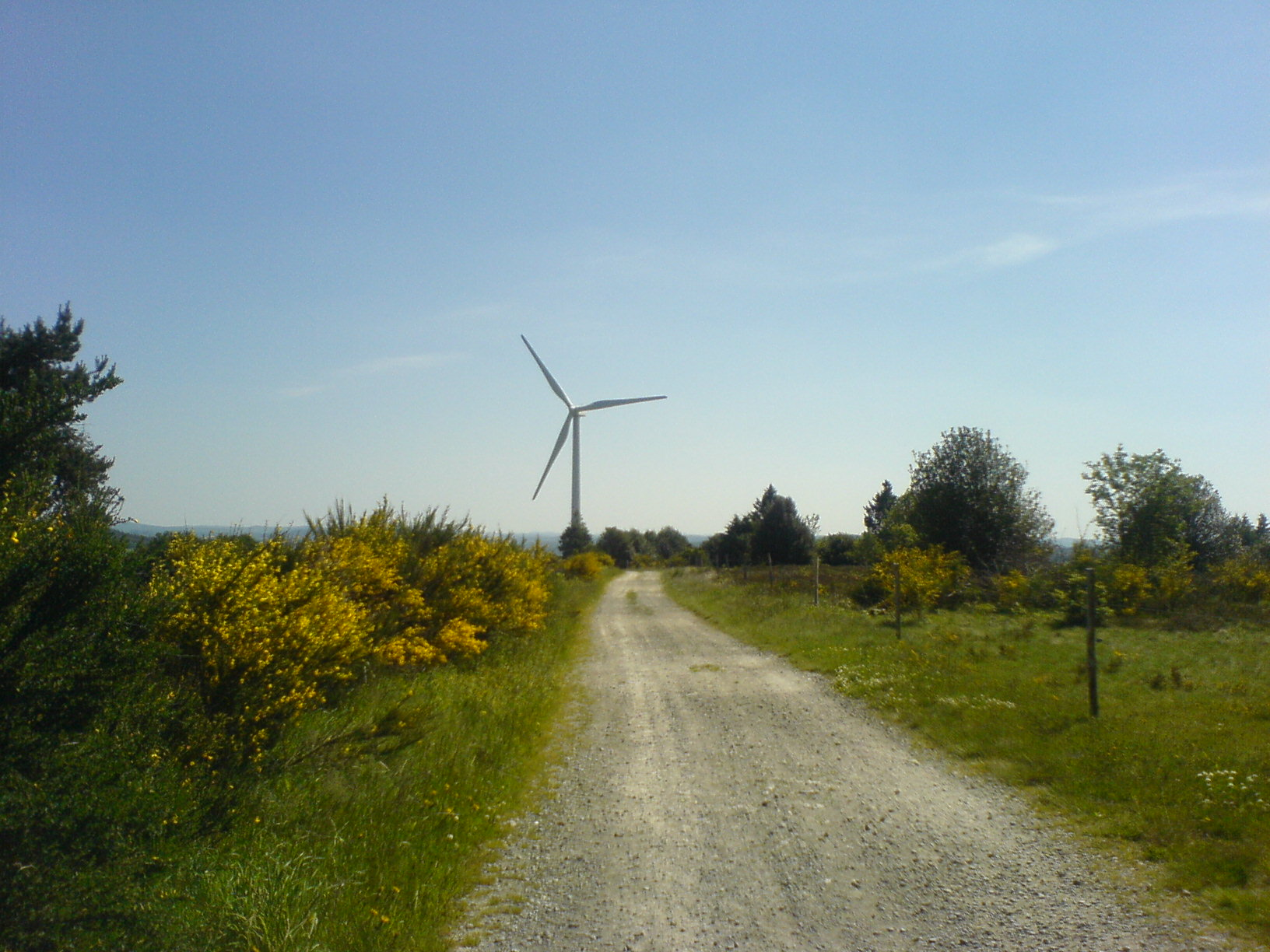

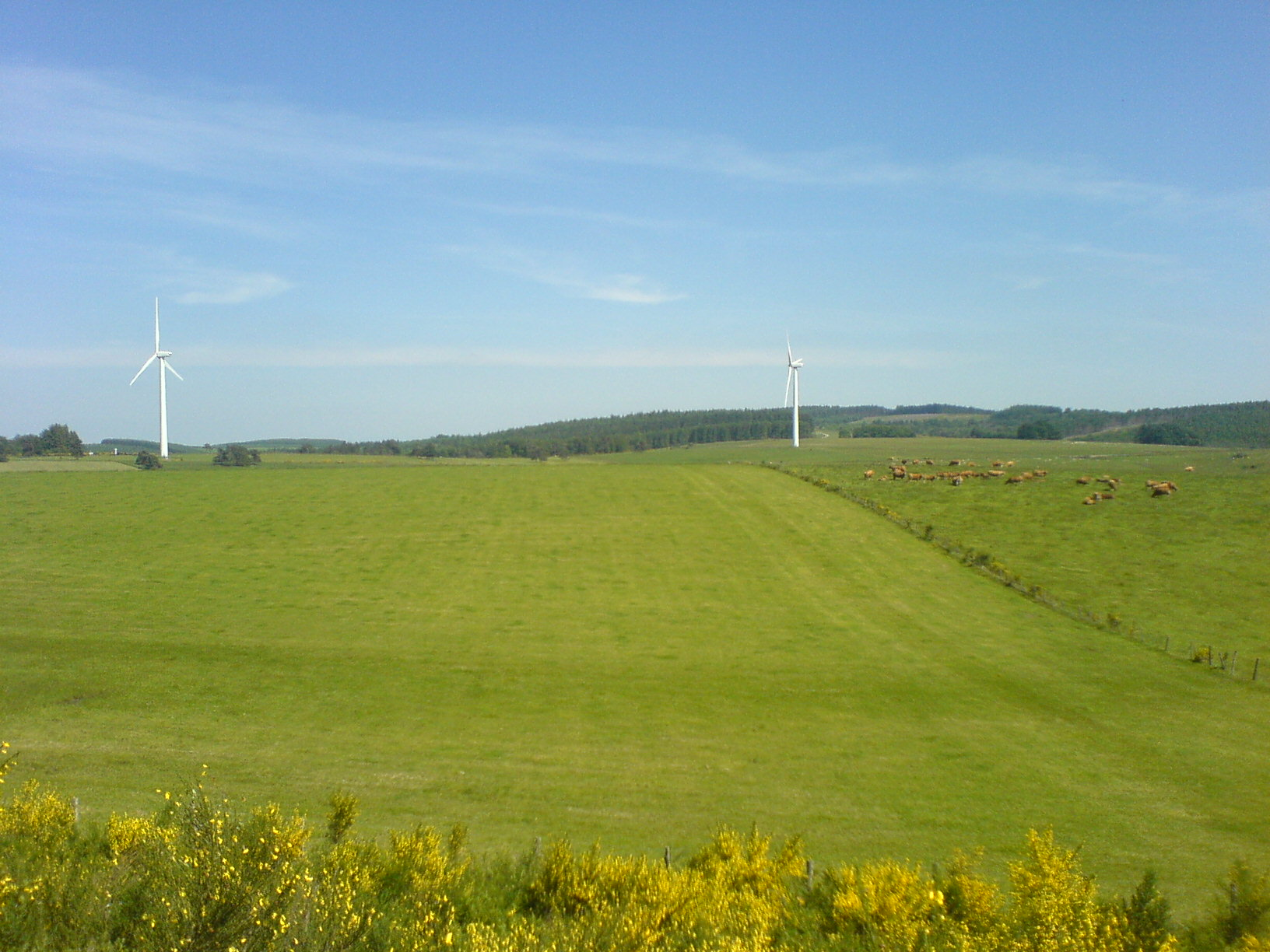

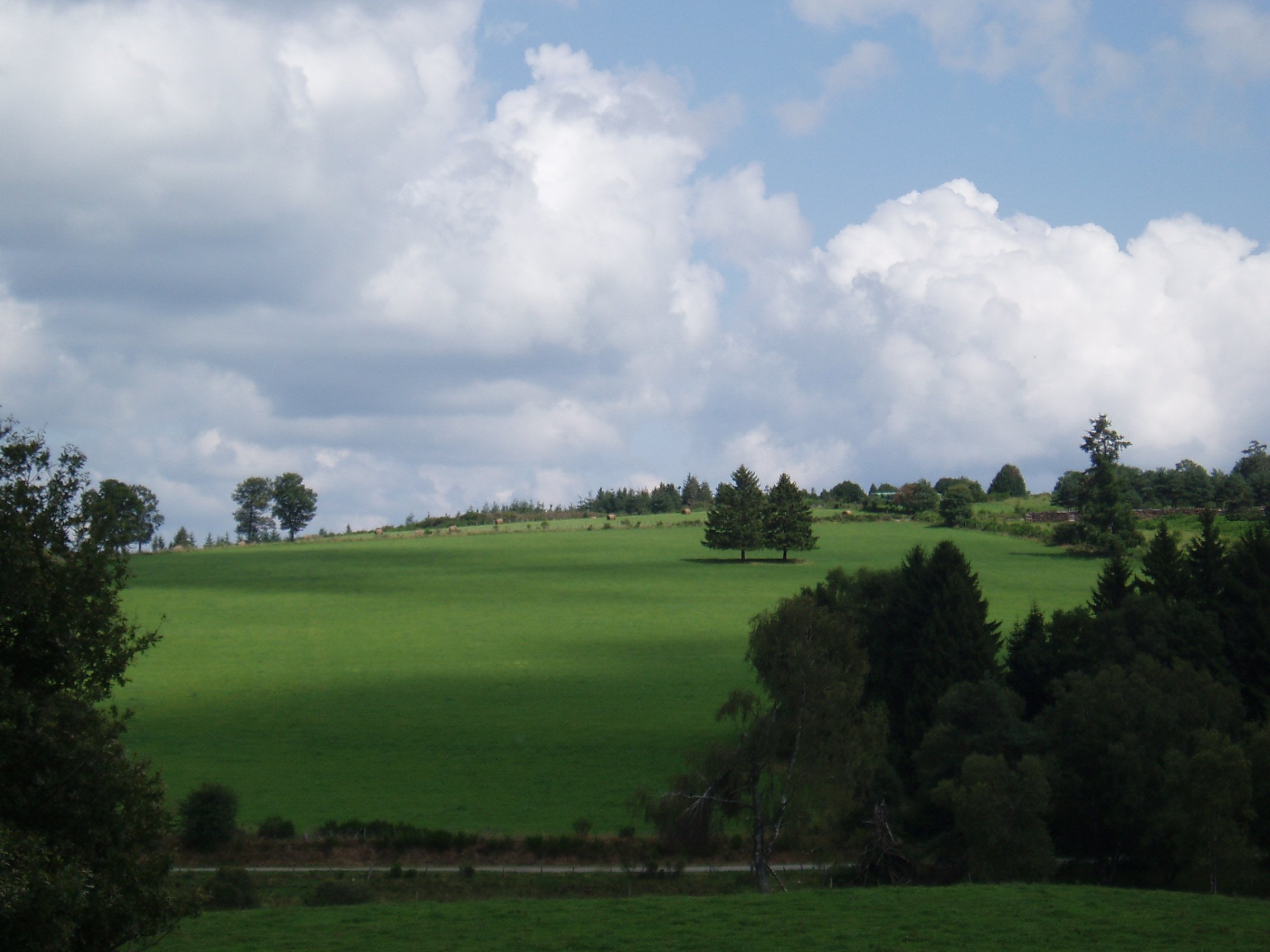

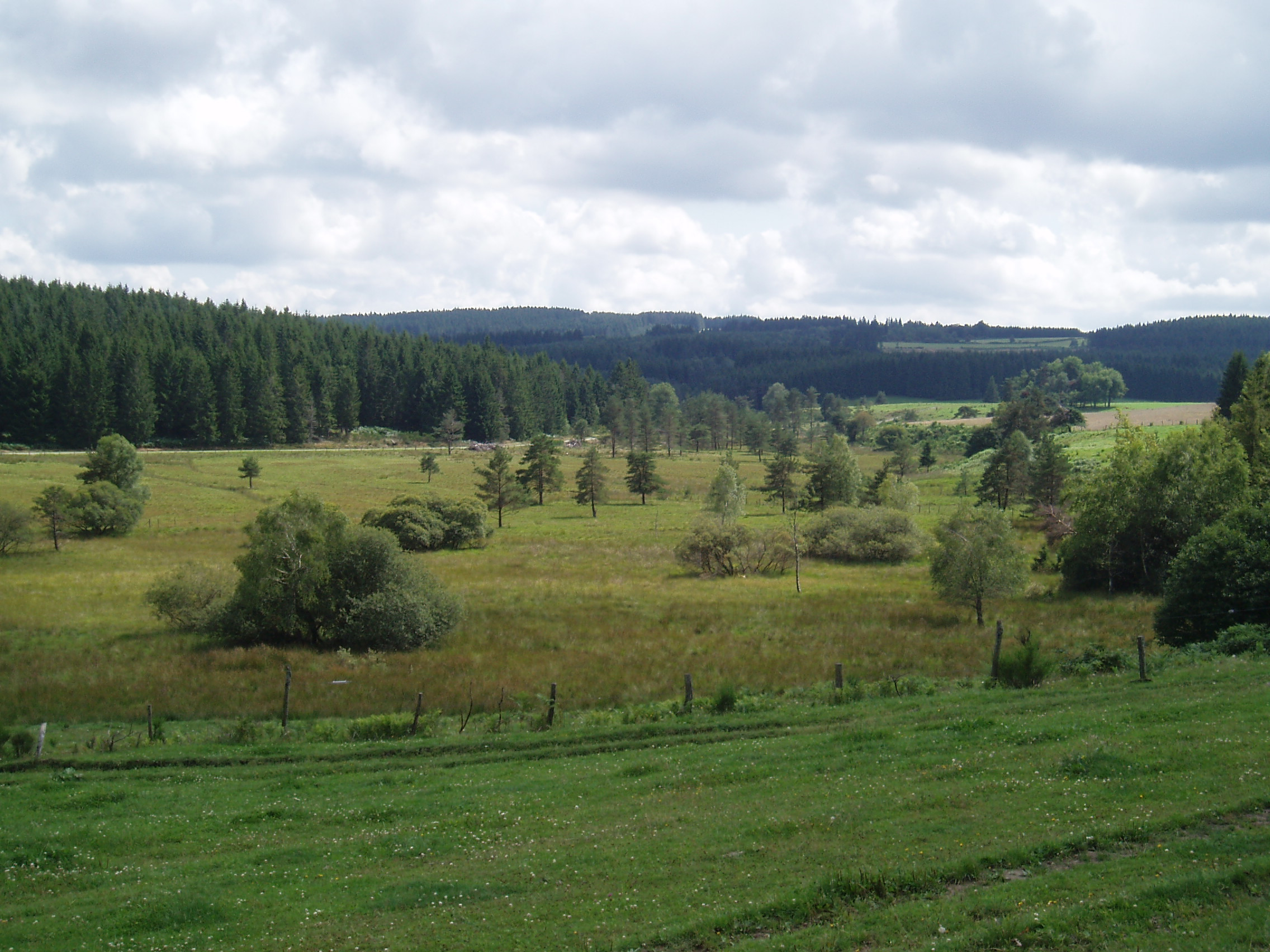

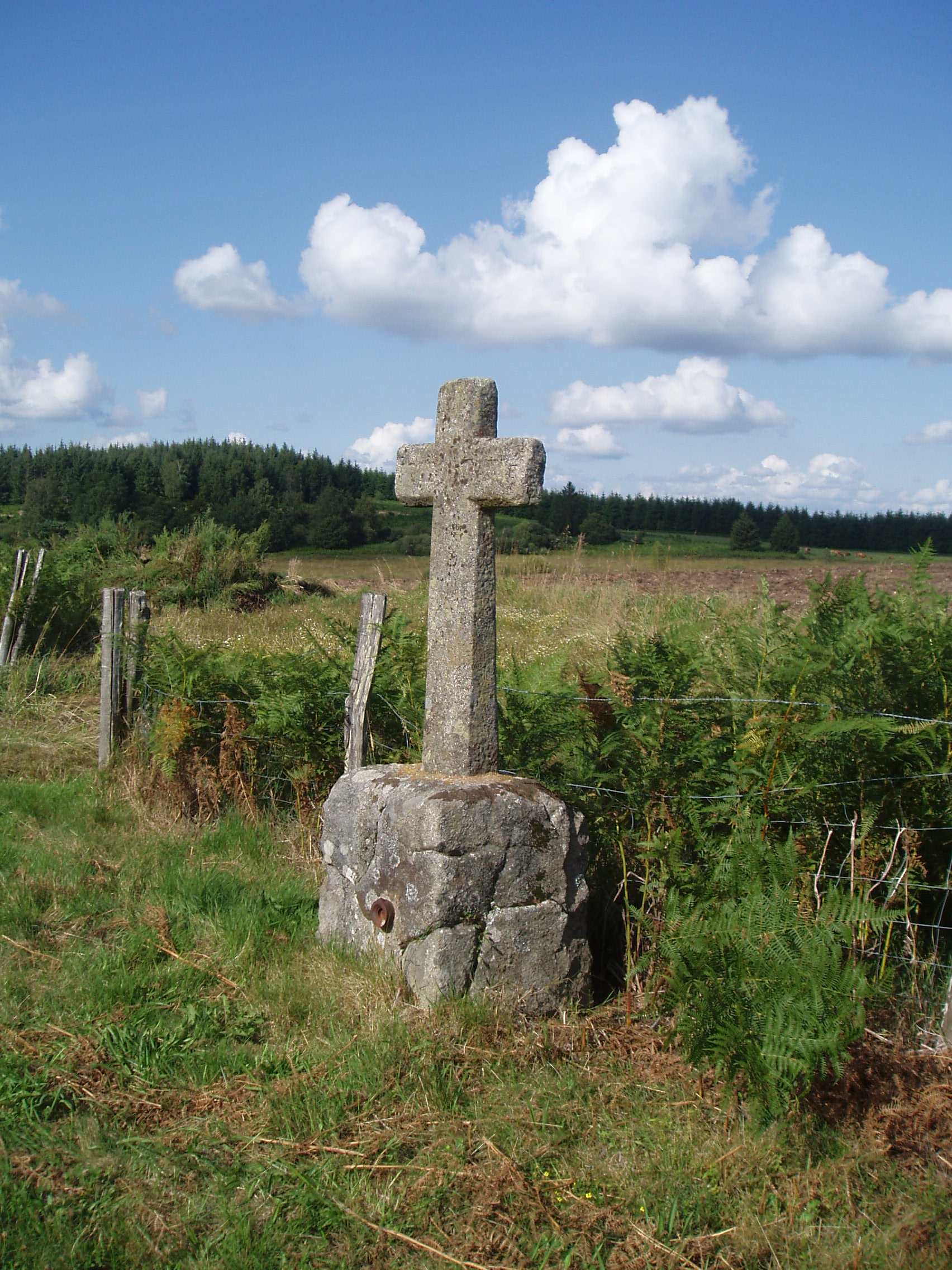

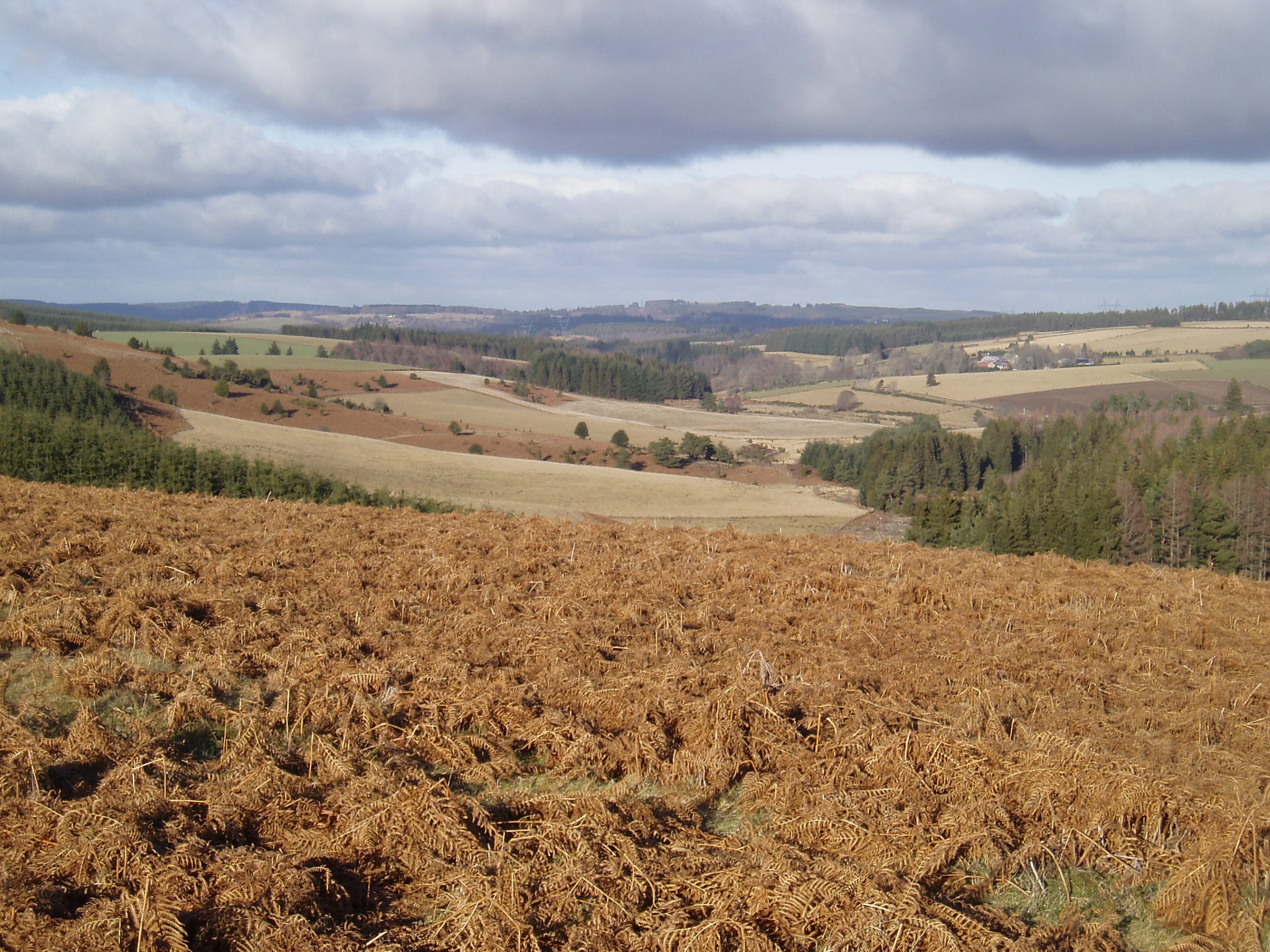

== See also ==
- Communes of the Creuse department
