= Camille du Bois de la Motte =

French marchioness and political activist

Camille du Bois de la Motte (1764–1819) was a French marchioness and political activist. In 1789, she was involved in the plans of Princess Hedvig Elisabeth Charlotte, a future queen of Sweden, to depose King Gustav III of Sweden, and acted as the link between Hedvig Elisabeth Charlotte and the Fersen family.

== Stay in Sweden ==
=== Friendship with duchess Charlotte ===
Camille Antoinette was the daughter of Louis Marie de Pons Saint-Maurice, the ambassador of France in Sweden in 1783–1789. As she had done during his tenure in Madrid, she accompanied him to Stockholm, where she acted as his hostess and secretary, and assisted him by creating a net of valuable contacts within the aristocracy and diplomatic corps through her role as a hostess.

In 1780, she married Emmanuel Paul Vincent, marquis de Cahideuc du Bois de La Motte (1764-1843).

In 1784, she made herself the personal friend of Princess Hedvig Elisabeth Charlotte during the absence of Sophie von Fersen, and that summer, the three women made a pledge of friendship by uniting in the order La verite et constante amitie at the Rosersberg Palace.

=== French agent ===
France, which was the ally of both Sweden and Russia, opposed the Russo-Swedish War (1788–90), and her father wished to initiate peace negotiations between Sweden and Russia through France. Camille du Bois de la Motte was given the task to use her friendship with Charlotte to arrange a meeting with her father and the King Gustav III of Sweden.

During the meeting, in the park of Karlberg Palace, Camille du Bois de la Motte handled the negotiations alone with the King in the presence of her father and Charlotte. She convinced the king to agree to peace negotiations. They were to be handled by her father, who would keep in touch with Russia through the French ambassador in Russia, and the Swedish king through Charlotte. The negotiations, however, failed, and she told Charlotte that she believed Gustav III to have agreed to them to stall time and that it had been his intention to trick France all along.

During the war, her friendship with Charlotte was criticized, as it was believed that she used it to inform the foreign diplomats in Stockholm of war secrets given to her by Charlotte. Princess Charlotte denied this, but it was likely the truth.

During the Riksdag of 1789, Hedvig Elisabeth Charlotte prepared to depose Gustav III and place her husband Duke Charles upon the throne, and the war and the Union and Security Act had made her a leading part of the opposition from the nobility. She cooperated with Prince Frederick Adolf and Gustaf Adolf Reuterholm. The plan was to force Charles to act as a symbol of the opposition to the Union and Security Act when the time was right. When the time arrived to make Charles act, however, he refused, which effectively discontinued the coup. Camille du Bois de la Motte is known to have been involved in the attempted coup: she acted as a channel between the party of the princess and that of the von Fersen family, who represented the opposition of the nobility, as well as the diplomatic corps of Stockholm.

== Later life ==
Camille du Bois de la Motte left Sweden with her father when the diplomatic contact between France and Sweden was severed during the war in late 1789. She followed her father to Berlin, where she acted as his secretary and hostess during his post there. They later returned to France.

She and Charlotte continued their correspondence even after all correspondence between France and Sweden were banned by Gustav III after the French Revolution. She may have influenced Charlotte's political views: initially, Charlotte, as a sympathizer of a constitutional monarchy, welcomed the revolution, but her views became conservative during the 1790s. Camille du Bois de la Motte was a French royalist, whose family lost its assets during the revolution. She acted as the agent of Charlotte in France, and Charlotte's friend, Sophie von Fersen, are known to have sent sensitive letters to Axel von Fersen the Younger through her.

In 1792, Camille du Bois de la Motte warned Charlotte that the next appointed ambassador of France to Sweden, Raymond de Verninac Saint-Maur, was an untrustworthy Jacobin, a warning she is to have sent Charlotte on the mission of queen Marie Antoinette.

== See also ==
- Constance Wilhelmine de Saint-Priest, another contemporary Frenchwoman active as a spy and diplomat in Sweden
