= Clara Bonde =

Swedish courtier

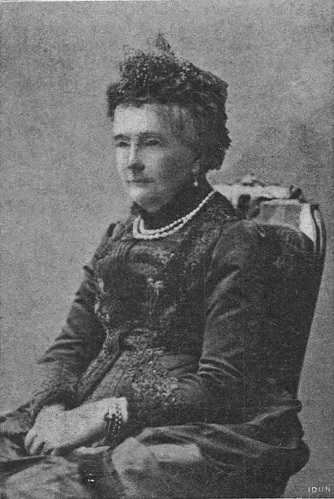
A portrait of Clara Christina Eleonora Bonde

Clara Christina Eleonora Bonde af Björnö, née Rålamb (1 July 1806 - 12 January 1899) was a Swedish courtier.

She was born to the royal equerry baron Claes Rålamb and the former maid of honor Ulrika Eleonora von Düben. In 1823, she was appointed hovfröken (maid of honor) to queen Desiree, and became a member of the first court staff of the queen, who returned to Sweden after twelve years in exile that year. She is described as good humored and witty and became a leading figure in social court life. Because of her manner and good French, she was able to handle the infamous hot temperament of king Charles XIV John, and because of this, she was often given the task to present him with news, especially such news which could upset him.

On 16 December 1828, she married count Gustaf Ulf Bonde af Björnö and retired from court to participate in the high society life of Stockholm for a couple of years. Hers was described as the last of the weddings celebrated in accordance with all honors formerly customarily afforded members of the court when they married.

In 1836, she returned to court and was appointed statsfru (Lady of the Bedchamber) to queen Desirée, a position she kept until the queen's death in 1861. She was a favorite of the queen who referred to her as Ma cherie Claire and trusted her advice. She was also well liked by the other members of the royal house: crown prince Oscar and crown princess Josephine referred to her as aunt Clara and the santa claus of the royal palace and regarded her a family member. The correspondence between her and the members of the royal family are preserved.

After the death of her spouse in 1855, she was for a time given the responsibility for several estates until the heirs were old enough to manage them.
