= Duke of Almazán de Saint Priest =

Dukedom of Spain

Dukedom of Almazán de Saint Priest
- Creation date: 30 September 1830
- Created by: Ferdinand VII
- Peerage: Peerage of Spain
- First holder: Emmanuel Louis Marie Guignard de Saint-Priest, 1st Duke of Almazán
- Present holder: Béatrice Marguerite Marie-Thérèse de Castellane, 5th Duchess of Almazán de Saint Priest

Duke of Almazán de Saint Priest (Spanish: Duque de Almazán de Saint Priest), is a title of Spanish nobility that is accompanied by the dignity of Grandee of Spain. It was granted to Emmanuel Louis Guignard de Saint-Priest on 30 September 1830 by King Ferdinand VII.

At the death of the 3rd Duchess, the title became vacant, until Juan Carlos I rehabilitated it on behalf of Louis Provence Boniface de Castellane, a direct descendant of the 3rd Duchess, on 22 January 1993. Initially created as "Duke of Almazán", it was rehabilitated as "Duke of Almazán de Saint Priest", in order to differentiate it from the older Dukedom of Almazán.

== Dukes of Almazán de Saint Priest (1830) ==
- Emmanuel Louis Marie Guignard de Saint-Priest, 1st Duke of Almazán
- François Marie Joseph Guignard de Saint-Priest, 2nd Duke of Almazán
- Marguerite Louise Guignard de Saint-Priest, 3rd Duchess of Almazán
- Louis Provence Boniface de Castellane, 4th Duke of Almazán de Saint Priest
- Béatrice Marguerite Marie-Thérèse de Castellane, 5th Duchess of Almazán de Saint Priest

== See also ==
- List of dukes in the peerage of Spain
- List of current grandees of Spain
