= Constance Wilhelmine de Saint-Priest =

French countess

- Born: 7 May 1752
- Died: 12 February 1807 (aged 54)
- Spouse: François-Emmanuel Guignard (m. 1774)
- Children: Guillaume Emmanuel Guignard; Armand Charles Emmanuel Guignard; Emmanuel Louis Marie Guignard

Constance Wilhelmine de Saint-Priest (7 May 1752–12 February 1807) was a French countess. She was active as a spy and diplomat in Sweden.

She was born to count Wilhelm Moritz Heinrich von Ludolf, Ambassador of Naples in Constantinople, and Catherine Chabert, and married the ambassador of France, François-Emmanuel Guignard, comte de Saint-Priest, in October 1774.

During the French Revolution, the couple left for Sweden, where they participated in high society. In the summer of 1794, they were banned from the Swedish royal court at Drottningholm Palace, as it had become known that they were given an allowance from Catherine the Great and assumed to be dangerous Russian spies. In the spring of 1796, the movement of Russian troops along the Finnish border gave rise to suspicions in Sweden that Russia was preparing war because of the discontent of Catherine the Great that Gustav IV Adolf of Sweden had been engaged to Duchess Louise Charlotte of Mecklenburg-Schwerin instead of Grand Duchess Alexandra Pavlovna of Russia. The Swedish government of Gustaf Adolf Reuterholm tried to negotiate with the Russian ambassador to Stockholm, Andrei Budberg, but without success. Constance Wilhelmine de Saint-Priest, known for her Russian connections, was thereby assigned through the Spanish ambassador to issue negotiations with Budberg and convince him to agree to informal negotiations with a representative. She succeeded, and Budberg met with Hans Henric von Essen at her apartment. The negotiations were successful. When Gustav IV Adolf of Sweden left for Russia for his engagement with Grand Duchess Alexandra Pavlovna of Russia later that year, de Saint-Priest implied that it was due to her intermission that Sweden and Russia had agreed to avoid war through a marriage alliance.

Constance Wilhelmine de Saint-Priest was rewarded by Gustaf Adolf Reuterholm by being admitted to court again and by having a position at court secured for her current lover Aminoff. She died in Stockholm.

== See also ==
- Camille du Bois de la Motte, another contemporary Frenchwoman active as a spy and diplomat in Sweden
