= Emmanuel Louis Marie Guignard de Saint-Priest, 1st Duke of Almazán =

French politician and diplomat (1789–1881)

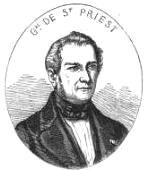

Emmanuel Louis Marie Guignard, vicomte de Saint-Priest, 1st Duke of Almazán, GE (1789, Paris – February 26, 1881), was a French politician and diplomat during the Bourbon Restoration. He was the son of François-Emmanuel Guignard, comte de Saint-Priest, one of King Louis XVI's last ministers. Born during the opening days of the French Revolution, he was the godson of Queen Marie Antoinette.

Like his eldest brother, Guilliame Emmanuel Guignard, vicomte de Saint-Priest (1776–1814), he took part in the Allied invasion of France in 1814 as part of the Russian army. During the Bourbon Restoration, he was attached to the service of King Louis XVIII's nephew, Louis-Antoine, Duc d'Angoulême, and during the Hundred Days tried to rouse the Dauphiné region in favor of the royal cause.

He served with distinction in Spain in 1823, where he was promoted to the rank of lieutenant-general. After two years at court of Berlin, he became the French ambassador in Madrid, where he negotiated in 1828 the settlement of the Spanish debt. When the July Revolution in 1830 compelled his retirement, the Spanish king Ferdinand VII in recognition of his services made him a grandee of Spain, with the title of Duke of Almazán.

He then joined the circle of former King Charles X's widowed daughter-in-law, Caroline Ferdinande Louise, duchesse de Berry, at Naples, and arranged her escapade in Provence in 1832. Saint-Priest was arrested, and was only released after an imprisonment of ten months. Having arranged for an asylum in Austria for the duchess, he returned to Paris, where he was one of the leaders of Legitimist society until his death, which occurred at Saint-Priest, near Lyon.
