= Saint-Priest-Taurion =

- Commune
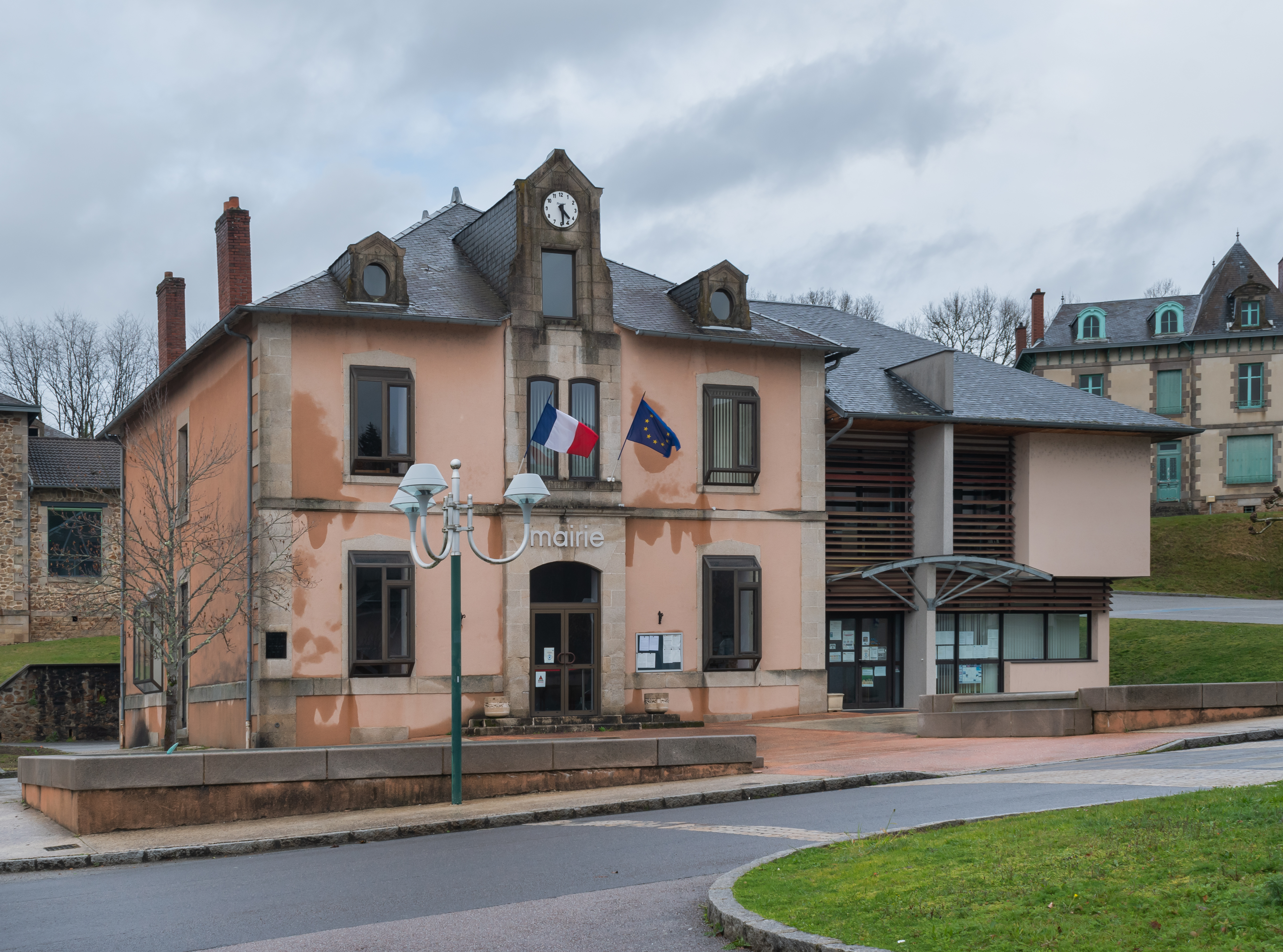
- Town hall of Saint-Priest-Taurion
- Location of Saint-Priest-Taurion
- Location within France Location within Nouvelle-Aquitaine
- Coordinates: 45°53′15″N 1°24′03″E
- Country: France
- Region: Nouvelle-Aquitaine
- Department: Haute-Vienne
- Arrondissement: Limoges
- Canton: Saint-Léonard-de-Noblat

Government
  - Mayor (2020–2026): Claudette Rossander
- Area^{1}: 27.00 km^{2} (10.42 sq mi)
- Highest elevation: 428 m (1,404 ft)
- Lowest elevation: 223 m (732 ft)
- Population (2023): 2,901
  - Density: 107.4/km^{2} (278.3/sq mi)
- Time zone: UTC+01:00 (CET)
  - Summer (DST): UTC+02:00 (CEST)
- INSEE/Postal code: 87178 /87480
- ^{1} French Land Register data, which excludes lakes, ponds, glaciers > 1 km^{2} (0.386 sq mi or 247 acres) and river estuaries.

Saint-Priest-Taurion (French pronunciation: [sɛ̃ pʁijɛ(st) toʁjɔ̃]; Occitan: Sent Prech) is a commune in the Haute-Vienne department in the Nouvelle-Aquitaine region in west-central France. Its INSEE code is 87178 and its postal code is 87480.

== Population ==
Historical population
Year	Pop.	±% p.a.
1968	1,687	—
1975	1,690	+0.03%
1982	2,266	+4.28%
1990	2,506	+1.27%
1999	2,613	+0.47%
2007	2,684	+0.34%
2012	2,830	+1.07%
2017	2,881	+0.36%
2023	2,901	+0.12%
Source: INSEE

== See also ==
- Communes of the Haute-Vienne department
