= François-Emmanuel Guignard, comte de Saint-Priest =

French diplomat

The Count of Saint-Priest
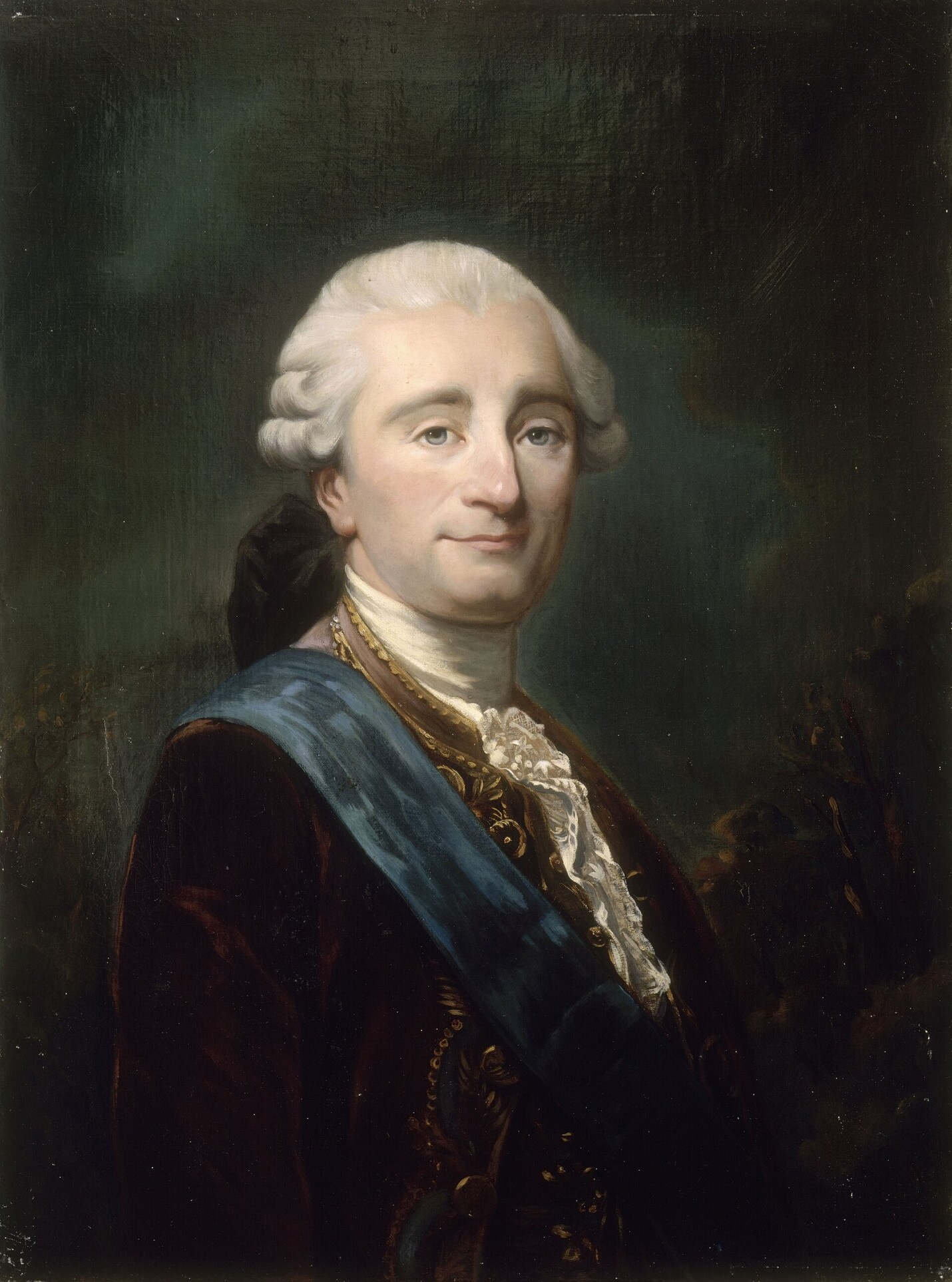

Minister of the Interior
- In office 7 August 1790 – 25 January 1791
- Preceded by: Office established
- Succeeded by: Claude Antoine de Valdec de Lessart

Secretary of State of the Maison du Roi
- In office 19 July 1789 – 7 August 1790
- Preceded by: Pierre-Charles Laurent de Villedeuil
- Succeeded by: Office abolished

Ambassador to the Ottoman Empire
- In office 1768–1784
- Preceded by: The Count of Vergennes
- Succeeded by: Marie-Gabriel-Florent-Auguste de Choiseul-Gouffier

Personal details
- Born: 12 March 1735 Grenoble, Kingdom of France
- Died: 26 February 1821 (aged 85) Saint-Priest, Kingdom of France
- Spouse: Wilhelmina von Ludolf (m. 1774; died 1807)
- Children: Guillaume Emmanuel Guignard; Armand Charles Emmanuel Guignard; Emmanuel Louis Marie Guignard

François-Emmanuel Guignard, comte de Saint-Priest (12 March 1735 – 26 February 1821), was a French politician and diplomat during the Ancien Régime and French Revolution.

== Biography ==
=== Early life and career ===
Born in Grenoble, he was admitted as a chevalier to the Order of Malta at five years of age, and at fifteen entered the army. He left active service in 1763 with the rank of colonel, and for the next four years represented the court of France in Portugal.

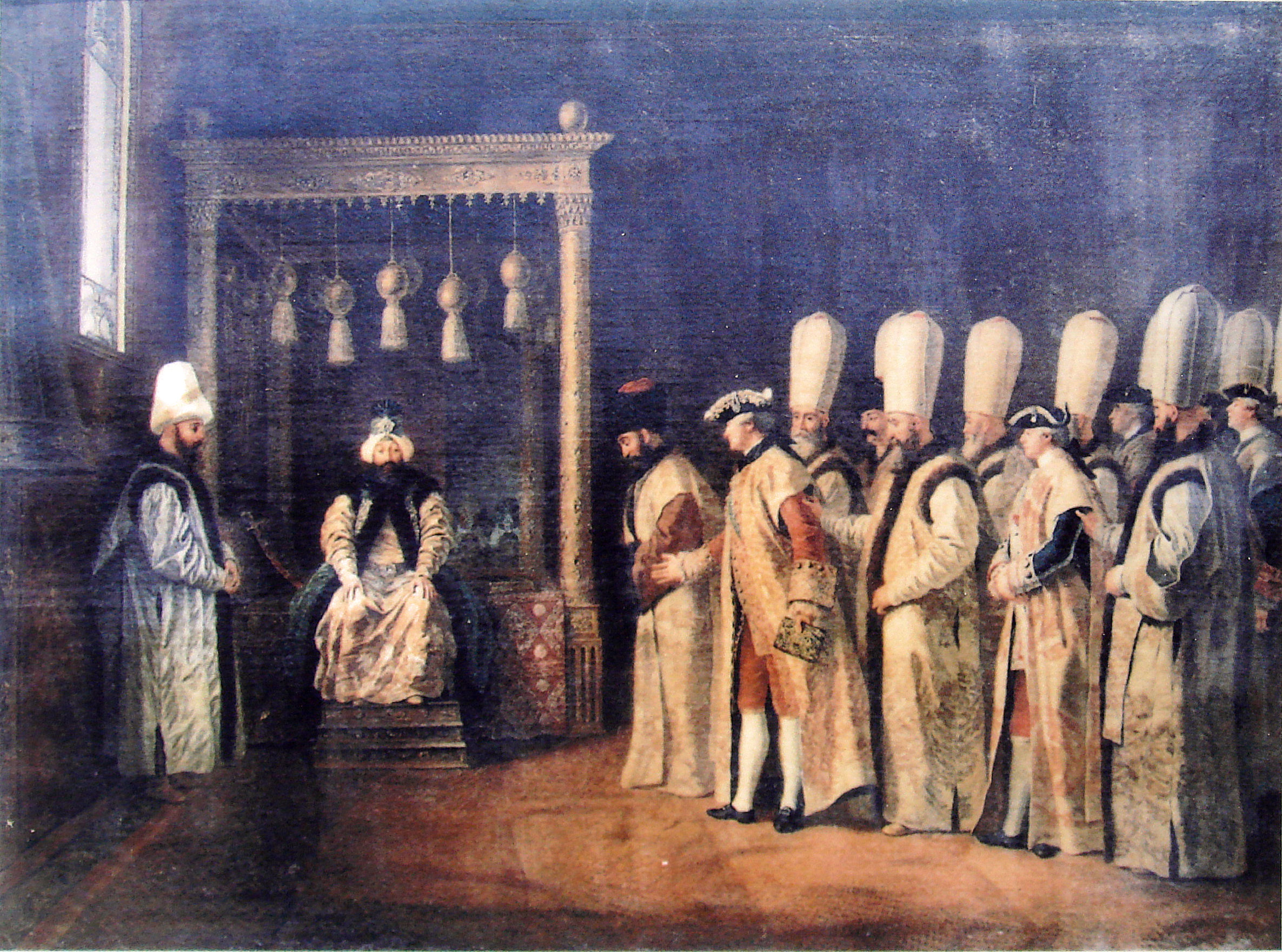
Reception ceremony of the Comte de Saint Priest at the Ottoman Porte, by Antoine de Favray, 1767.

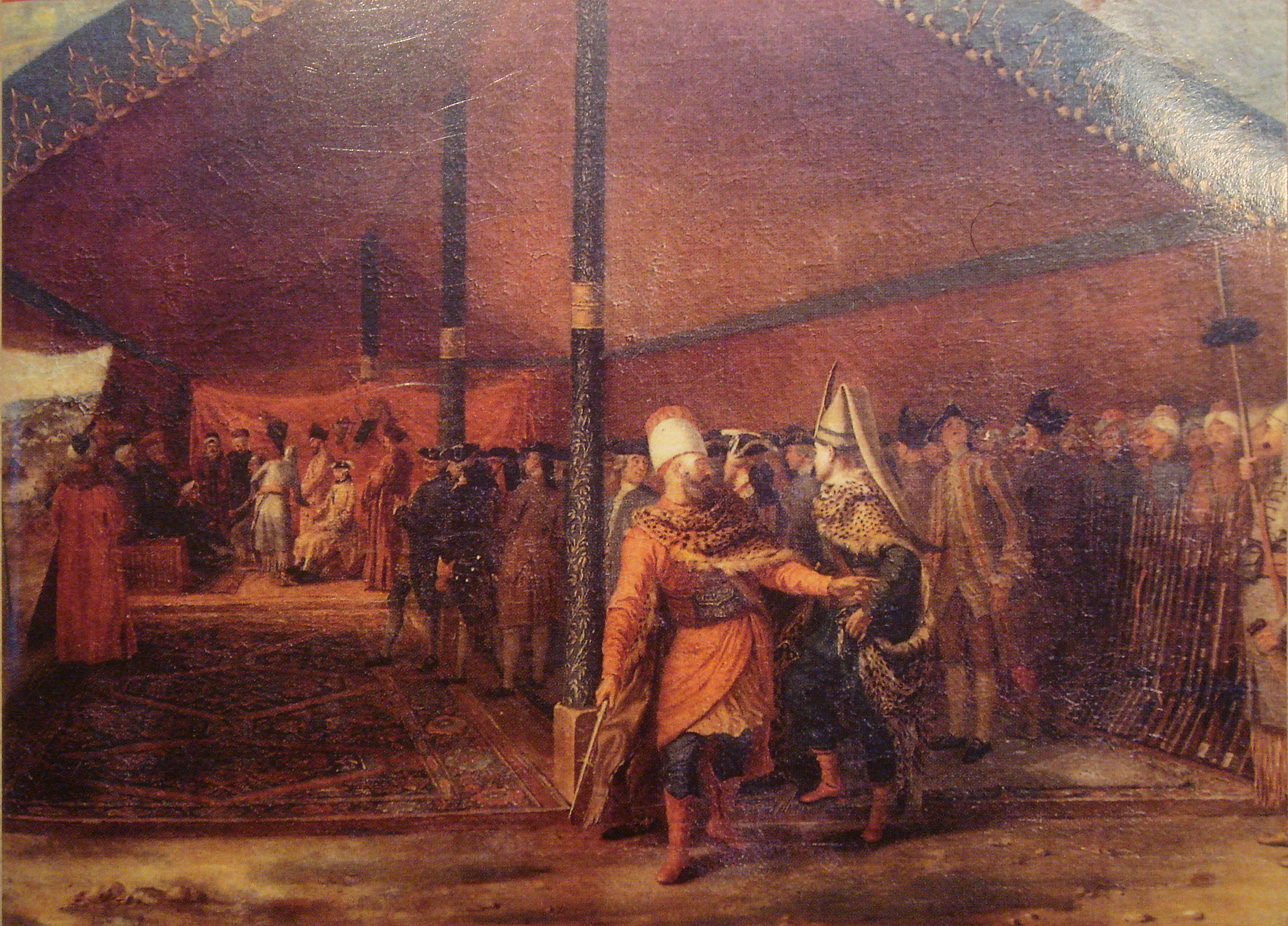
M. de Saint-Priest with the Grand Vizier at the camp of Daud Pasha in 1769, by Antoine de Favray.

Saint-Priest was sent as an ambassador in 1768 to the Ottoman Empire, where he remained (with the exception of one short interval) until 1784. He sponsored the reconstruction of Saint Pierre Han, a commercial facility for French and other European merchants, which had been destroyed by fire in 1771. While there, he married Wilhelmina von Ludolf, the daughter of the ambassador of the Kingdom of Naples to the Sublime Porte. His Mémoires sur l'ambassade de France en Turquie et le commerce des Français dans le Levant, prepared during a return visit to France, were only published in 1877, when they were edited by Charles Schefer. Besides these, he wrote an Examen des assemblés provinciales (1787).

=== Revolution ===
In 1788, after a few months spent at the court of The Hague, he joined the ministry of Jacques Necker as a minister without portfolio. He was one of three liberals dismissed from their posts when the conservative intrigues of the comte d'Artois (the king's youngest brother) and the duchesse de Polignac reached a climax during the second week of July 1789. That success, however, ended with the storming of the Bastille. In Necker's subsequent second cabinet, St.-Priest was reinstated as the secrétaire d'état of the royal household, the Maison du Roi. Later, in August 1790, he was also named by King Louis XVI as the Ministre de l'Intérieur.

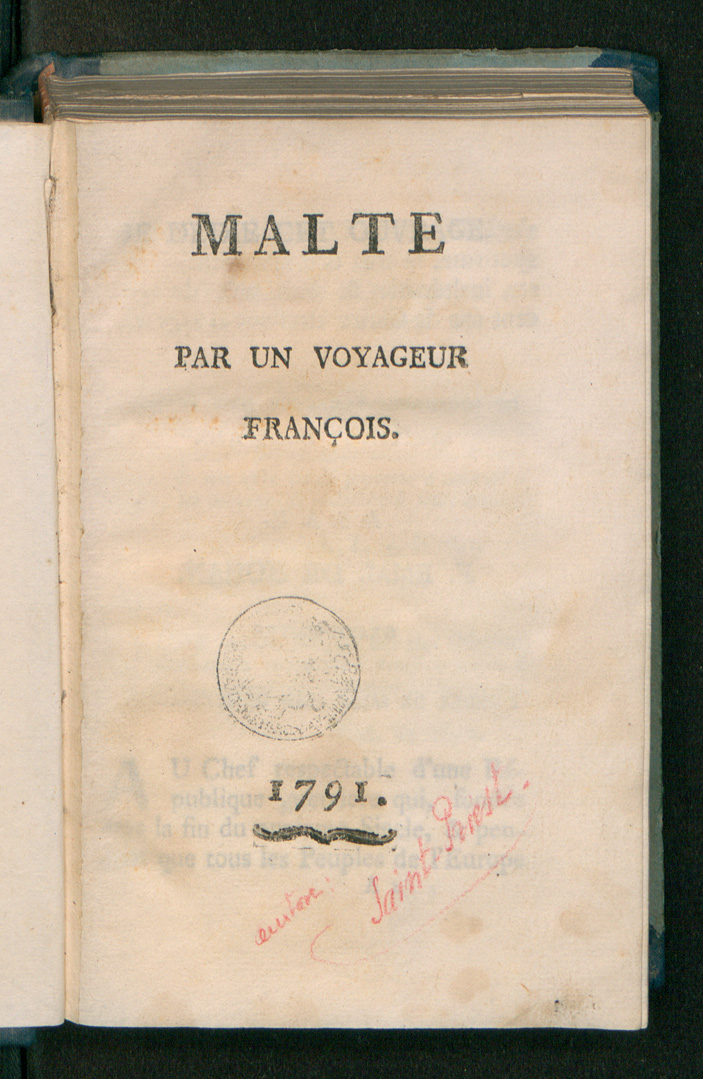
Malte, 1791

As the French Revolution progressed, he became alarmed at the increase of the National Constituent Assembly's power at the expense of the King's royal authority. He became a special object of popular hatred when he was alleged to have replied to women begging for bread: "You had enough while you had only one king; demand bread of your twelve hundred sovereigns". Nevertheless, he held office until January 1791.

=== Exile ===
Shortly after his resignation he went to Stockholm, where his brother-in-law was the ambassador of the Holy Roman Emperor, Leopold II, to the Swedish court.

In 1795, the royal duchess Charlotte mentioned him in her famous diary as a suspected agent for the Russian Empire. According to the rumor, countess Ulrica Eleonora Rålamb was the lover of count Carl Mörner (1755–1821), who had a central position at the royal court and was well informed about classified state secrets. In parallel, she was also a close acquaintance of François-Emmanuel Guignard, comte de Saint-Priest, whose wife Constance Wilhelmine de Saint-Priest was well known to be a Russian agent in Sweden. According to the information of Charlotte, Rålamb acquired classified information from the well informed Mörner, and gave the information to Saint Priest, who in turn sent it to Platon Zubov, the favorite of Catherine the Great, in Russia. The suspected activities were never officially investigated, however.

In 1795 he joined King Louis XVI's middle brother, the comte de Provence, at Verona as an émigré minister of the House of Bourbon. After the death of Louis XVI's son, the comte de Provence declared himself King Louis XVIII. Later, Saint-Priest accompanied Louis XVIII's exiled court to Blankenburg and Mittau. In 1808, in disagreement with the policies of Louis XVIII, he retired to Switzerland. After vainly seeking permission from Napoleon to return to France, he was expelled from Switzerland, and wandered about Europe until the Bourbon Restoration.

=== Return to France and death ===
Despite his years of service to Louis XVIII, his early liberalism in the late 1780s, his resignation from the émigré government in 1808 and his attempts to seek a rapprochement with Bonaparte meant that he was not allowed by the restored king to participate in the new Ultra-royalist government. As a result, he lived quietly at his country estates until his death in 1821.

== Family ==
His eldest son, Guillaume Emmanuel (1776–1814) became a major-general in the Russian army, and served in the Napoleonic campaigns of Alexander I. The second son, Armand Emmanuel Charles (1782–1863), became the Governor of Podolia and Odessa in Russia The third son of François, Emmanuel Louis Marie (1789–1881), became a diplomat, leader of the Legitimist society in Paris and first Duke of Almazán de Saint Priest in the peerage of Spain.

François' nephew, Louis-Alexandre de Launay, comte d'Antraigues (1753–1812), was a famous pamphleteer, diplomat, spy and political adventurer during the French Revolution and the Napoleonic Wars.

Diplomatic posts
Preceded by Charles Gravier de Vergennes	Ambassador to the Ottoman Empire; 1768–1784	Succeeded by Marie-Gabriel-Florent-Auguste de Choiseul-Gouffier
