= Armand Charles Emmanuel Guignard, comte de Saint-Priest =

French aristocrat (1782–1863)

Armand Charles Emmanuel Guignard
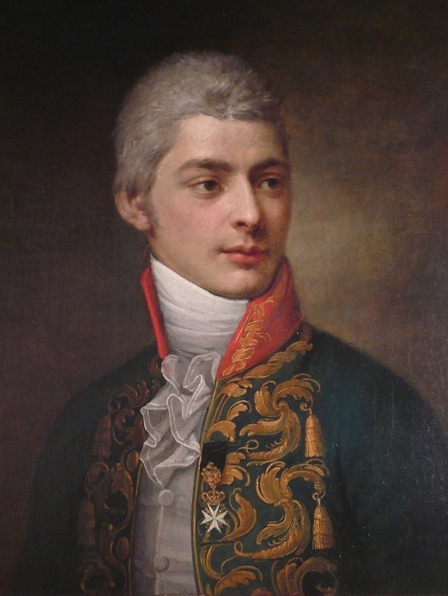
- Born: 1782
- Died: 1863 (aged 80–81)
- Occupation: Diplomat
- Years active: 1820s–1860s
- Title: Peer of France
- Spouse: Princess Sophie Alexeievna Galitzine
- Children: Alexis Guignard
- Parent(s): François-Emmanuel Guignard and Constance Wilhelmine de Saint-Priest

Armand Charles Emmanuel Guignard, comte de Saint-Priest (1782–1863) was a French aristocrat who was involved in both the politics of France and the Russian Empire during the First French Empire and the Bourbon Restoration. He was the second son of prominent French émigré diplomat François-Emmanuel Guignard, comte de Saint-Priest, one of King Louis XVI of France's last ministers.

During the Napoleonic Wars, he served Czar Alexander I of Russia. During this time, he married Princess Sophie Alexeievna Galitzine (23 November 1777 – 23 July 1814), the daughter of a highly noble Lithuanian-Russian family. In appreciation of his loyalty, Alexander made him the Governor of Podolia and Odessa.

In 1822, he returned to France with his son, Alexis Guignard, comte de Saint-Priest, and was made a Peer of France.
