= Guillaume Emmanuel Guignard, vicomte de Saint-Priest =

French émigré general who fought in the Imperial Russian Army (1776-1814)

Guillaume Emmanuel Guignard de Saint-Priest
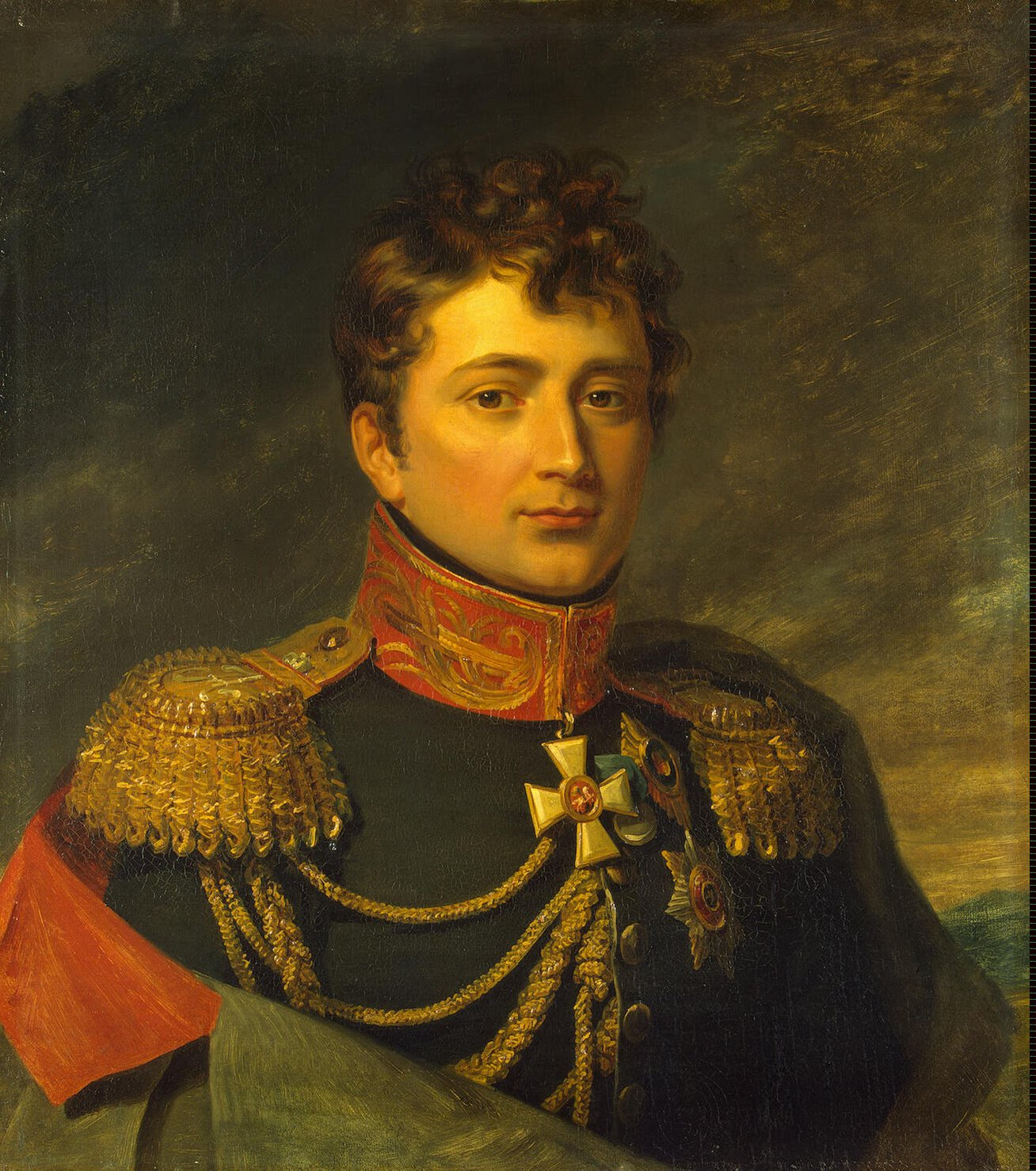
- Guillaume Emmanuel Guignard by George Dawe
- Born: 4 March 1776; Constantinople, Ottoman Empire
- Died: 29 March 1814 (aged 38); Laon, France
- Other name: Emmanuil Francevich Saint-Priest
- Military career
- Allegiance: Russian Empire
- Rank: Major-general
- Conflicts: Napoleonic Wars; Battle of Großdrebnitz; Battle of Reims
- Awards: (Russian Empire) Order of St. Anna, 1st class; (Russian Empire) Order of St. Vladimir, 2nd class; (Russian Empire) Order of St. George, 2nd class; (Russian Empire) Order of St. George, 3rd class; (Russian Empire) Order of St. George, 4th class; (Russian Empire) Gold Sword for Bravery with diamonds; (Order of Knights of the Hospital of Saint John of Jerusalem) Order of St. John of Jerusalem; (Kingdom of Prussia) Pour le Mérite

Guillaume Emmanuel Guignard, vicomte de Saint-Priest (Note: Russian: Эммануил Францевич Сен-При, romanized: Emmanuil Francevich Sen-Pri) (4 March 1776, in Constantinople – 29 March 1814) was a French émigré general who fought in the Imperial Russian Army during the French Revolutionary Wars and the Napoleonic Wars.

He was the eldest son of prominent émigré diplomat François-Emmanuel Guignard, comte de Saint-Priest (1735–1821), one of King Louis XVI's last ministers, and Constance Wilhelmine de Saint-Priest.

Guillaume Emmanuel became a major-general in the Russian army under Emperor Alexander I of Russia, and fought against the forces of Napoleon. Some weeks before the Battle of Leipzig, he and his cavalry defeated the troops of French brigade general François Basile Azemar in the Battle of Großdrebnitz. Saint-Priest was defeated and mortally wounded during the 1814 Allied invasion of France in the Battle of Reims and died two weeks later at Laon.
