= List of compositions by Iannis Xenakis =

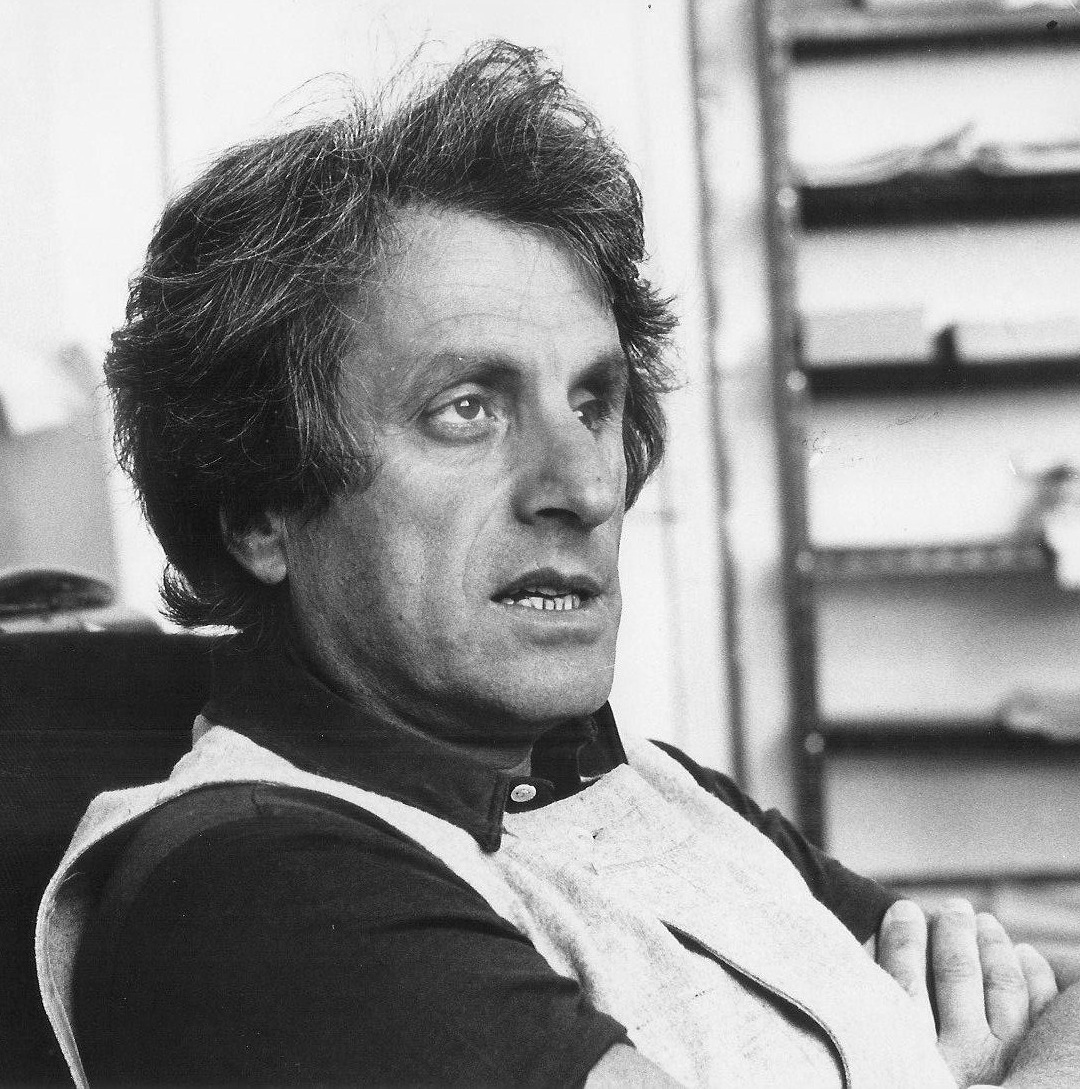
Iannis Xenakis in his Paris studio, c. 1970

This article presents a complete list of compositions by Iannis Xenakis (1922-2001), organized by instrumentation. Within each category, the works are arranged chronologically by year of composition.

== Orchestral works ==
=== Vocal ===
- Anastenaria: Procession aux eaux claires, for SATB chorus of 30 voices, male choir of 15 voices, and orchestra (1953)
- Polla ta dhina, for children's choir and orchestra (1962)
- Cendrées, for chorus and orchestra (1973–74)
- Anémoessa, for SATB chorus of 42 or 84 voices and orchestra (1979)
- Aïs, for amplified baritone, percussion and orchestra (1980)
- Nekuïa, for SATB chorus of 54 or 80 voices and orchestra (1981)

=== Stage ===
- Kraanerg, ballet for orchestra and tape (1968)
- Antikhthon, ballet for orchestra (1971)

=== Other orchestral ===
- Anastenaria: Le sacrifice (1953)
- Metastaseis (1953–54, also known as Metastaseis^{B})
- Pithoprakta (1955–56)
- Achorripsis, for an orchestra of 21 instruments (1956–57)
- Duel, for 2 small orchestras (1959)
- Syrmos, for string orchestra (1959)
- Stratégie for 2 orchestras (1959–62)
- ST/48, 1-240162 (1959–62)
- Hiketides (les suppliantes d'Eschyle), for brass quartet & 24 strings (1964)
- Akrata, for wind orchestra (1964–65)
- Terretektorh (1966)
- Polytope [de Montréal], for 4 orchestras (1967)
- Nomos gamma (1967–8)
- Synaphaï, for piano and orchestra (1969)
- Eridanos (1972)
- Erikhthon, for piano and orchestra (1974)
- Noomena (1974)
- Empreintes (1975)
- Jonchaies (1977)
- Pour les baleines, for string orchestra (1982)
- Lichens (1983)
- Shaar (1983)
- Alax, for three ensembles of 10 instruments each (1985)
- Horos (1986)
- Keqrops, for piano and orchestra (1986)
- Ata (1987)
- Tracées (1987)
- Kyania (1990)
- Tuorakemsu (1990)
- Dox-Orkh, for violin and orchestra (1991)
- Krinoïdi (1991)
- Roáï (1991)
- Troorkh, for trombone and orchestra (1991)
- Mosaïques (1993)
- Dämmerschein (1993–94)
- Koïranoï (1994)
- Ioolkos (1995)
- Voile, for string orchestra (1995)
- Sea-Change (1997)
- O-Mega, for percussion soloist and chamber orchestra (1997)

== Vocal works ==
=== Choral ===
- Zyia, for soprano soloist, male chorus, flute and piano (1952, also exists in a version for soprano soloist, flute and piano)
- Oresteia, for chorus and 12 instruments (1965–66)
- Medea senecae, for male voices and 6 instruments (1967)
- Nuits, for SATB chorus of 12 voices (1967–68)
- À Colone, for male or female voices and 3 instruments (1977)
- À Hélène, for female voices (1977)
- Pour la Paix, for SATB chorus, two male speakers, two female speakers, and tape (1981)
- Serment-Orkos, for SATB chorus of 32 or more voices (1981)
- Chant des Soleils, for SATB chorus, children's choir, brass ensemble and percussion (1983)
- Idmen A/Idmen B, for SATB chorus of 64 or more voices and percussion (1985)
- Knephas, for SATB chorus of 32 or more voices (1990)
- Pu wijnuej we fyp, for children's choir (1992)
- Les Bacchantes, for baritone soloist, female voices and 9 instruments (1993)
- Sea–Nymphs, for SATB chorus of 24 or more voices (1994)

=== Other vocal ===
- N'shima, for two mezzo-soprano or alto soloists, 2 horns, 2 trombones and cello (1975)
- Akanthos, for soprano, flute, clarinet, piano, 2 violins, viola, cello and double bass (1977)
- Pour Maurice, for baritone and piano (1982)
- Kassandra, for baritone/psalterion and percussion (1987, an additional movement for Oresteïa)
- La déesse Athéna, for baritone soloist, piccolo, oboe, E-flat clarinet, doublebass clarinet, contrabassoon, horn, piccolo trumpet, trombone, tuba, percussion and cello (1992, an additional movement for Oresteïa)

== Chamber music ==
=== With piano ===
- Eonta, for 2 trumpets, 3 trombones and piano (1963–64)
- Palimpsest, for English horn, bass clarinet, bassoon, horn, percussion, piano and string quintet (1979)
- Dikhthas, for violin and piano (1979)
- Thalleïn, for piccolo, oboe, clarinet, bassoon, horn, piccolo trumpet, trombone, percussion, piano and string quintet (1984)
- Akea, for piano and string quartet (1986)
- Paille in the Wind, for cello and piano (1992)
- Plektó, for flute, clarinet, percussion, piano, violin and cello (1993)

=== For string ensemble ===
- ST/4, 1-080262, for string quartet (1956–62, transcription of ST/48, 1-240162)
- Analogique A, for string ensemble (1958, must be performed with tape work Analogique B)
- Aroura, for string ensemble of 12 players (1971)
- Retours-Windungen, for 12 cellos (1976)
- Ikhoor, for string trio (1978)
- Tetras, for string quartet (1983)
- Tetora, for string quartet (1990)
- Ergma, for string quartet (1994)
- Hunem-Iduhey, for violin and cello (1996)
- Ittidra, for string sextet (1996)
- Roscobeck, for cello and double bass (1996)

=== For percussion ensemble ===
- Persephassa, for 6 percussionists (1969)
- Pléïades, for 6 percussionists (1978)
- Okho, for 3 djembés and bass-drum (1989)

=== Other chamber ===
- ST/10, 1-080262, for clarinet, bass clarinet, 2 horns, harp, percussion and string quartet (1956–62)
- Morsima-Amorsima, for piano, violin, cello and double bass (1962)
- Atrées, for flute, clarinet, bass clarinet, horn, trumpet, trombone, 2 percussionists, violin and cello (1962)
- Anaktoria, for clarinet, bassoon(and contrabasson), horn, string quartet and double bass (1969)
- Charisma, for clarinet and cello (1971)
- Linaia-Agon, for horn, trombone and tuba (1972)
- Phlegra, for flute, oboe, clarinet, bassoon, horn, trumpet, trombone, violin, viola, cello and double bass (1975)
- Epeï, for English horn, clarinet, trumpet, 2 trombones and double bass (1976)
- Dmaathen, for oboe and percussion (1976)
- Komboï, for amplified harpsichord and percussion (1981)
- Khal Perr, for brass quintet and 2 percussionists (1983)
- Nyūyō, for shakuhachi, sangen and 2 koto (1985)
- À l'île de Gorée, for amplified harpsichord, piccolo, oboe, clarinet, bassoon, horn, trumpet and string quintet (1986)
- Jalons, for piccolo, oboe, bass clarinet, doublebass clarinet, contrabassoon, horn, trumpet, trombone, tuba, harp, string quintet (1987)
- XAƧ, for saxophone quartet (1987)
- Waarg, for piccolo, oboe, clarinet, bassoon, horn, trumpet, trombone, tuba and string quintet (1988)
- Échange, for solo bass clarinet, flute, oboe, clarinet, bassoon, horn, trumpet, trombone, tuba and string quintet (1989)
- Epicycles, for solo cello, flute, oboe, clarinet, horn, trumpet, trombone, tuba, 2 violins, viola and double bass (1989)
- Oophaa, for harpsichord and percussion (1989)
- Mnamas xapin Witoldowi Lutoslavskiemu, for 2 horns and 2 trumpets (1994)
- Kaï, for flute, clarinet, bassoon, trumpet, trombone, violin, viola, cello and double bass (1995)
- Kuïlenn, for flute, 2 oboes, 2 clarinets, 2 bassoons and 2 horns (1995)
- Zythos, for trombone and six percussionists (1996)

== Solo instrumental ==
=== For piano ===
- Six Chansons pour piano (1950)
- Herma, for piano (1961)
- Evryali, for piano (1973)
- Mists, for piano (1981)
- à r. (Hommage à Ravel), for piano (1987)

=== For string instrument ===
- Nomos Alpha, for cello (1965–66)
- Mikka, for violin (1971)
- Theraps, for double bass (1975–76)
- Mikka 'S', for violin (1976)
- Kottos, for cello (1977)
- Embellie, for viola (1981)

=== Other solo instrumental ===
- Gmeeoorh, for organ (1974), commissioned by and for the 1974 International Contemporary Organ Music Festival at the Hartt School of Music, premiered by Clyde Holloway.
- Psappha, for percussion (1975)
- Khoaï, for harpsichord (1976)
- Naama, for amplified harpsichord (1984)
- Keren, for trombone (1986)
- Rebonds, for percussion (1988)

== Tape ==
- Diamorphoses, 2-track (1957–58)
- Concret PH, 2-track (1958)
- Analogique B, 2-track (1958–59, to be performed with the chamber work Analogique A)
- Orient-Occident, 2-track (1960, film score)
- The Thessaloniki World Fair, 1-track (1961)
- Bohor, 8-track (1962)
- Hibiki-Hana-Ma, 12-track (Polytope of Osaka, 1969–70)
- Persépolis, 8-track (Polytope of Persepolis, 1971)
- Polytope de Cluny, 8-track (1972)
- Polytope II (1974)
- La légende d'Eer (Diatope), 4- or 8-track (1977)

=== Created using UPIC ===
- Mycenae alpha, 2-track (Polytope of Mycenae, 1978)
- Taurhiphanie, 2-track (1987)
- Voyage absolu des Unari vers Andromède, 2-track (1989)

=== Created using dynamic stochastic synthesis ===
- GENDY3, 2-track (1991)
- S.709, 2-track (1994)

== Unpublished or withdrawn ==
This section lists early pieces by Xenakis that were not published during his lifetime and works that were withdrawn from the catalog by the composer himself for various reasons.

- Untitled piece for piano (February 1949, revised in June)
- Untitled piece for piano (March 1949)
- Untitled piece for piano (27 May 1949)
- Untitled piece for piano (October 1949)
- Menuet, for piano
- Air populaire, for piano
- Allegro molto, for piano
- Untitled piece for piano (January 1950)
- Mélodie, for piano
- Untitled piece for piano (April 1950)
- Untitled piece for piano (15 June 1950)
- Andante, for piano
- Thème et conséquences, for piano (1951, unpublished)
- Dhipli zyia, for violin and cello (1951, unpublished)
- Tripli zyia, for flute, voice and piano (1952, unpublished)
- Trois poèmes, for voice and piano (1952, unpublished)
- La colombe de la paix, for alto soloist and SATB chorus (1953, unpublished)
- Stamatis Katotakis, for soloist and male voices (1953, unpublished)
- Vasarely, tape (1960, film score, withdrawn)
- Formes rouges, tape (1961, film score, withdrawn)
- Amorsima-Morsima (1956–62, withdrawn)
- GENDY301, tape (1991, withdrawn)
- Erod, tape (1997, withdrawn, created using UPIC in collaboration with Brigitte Robindoré)
