= Antikhthon =

- by Iannis Xenakis
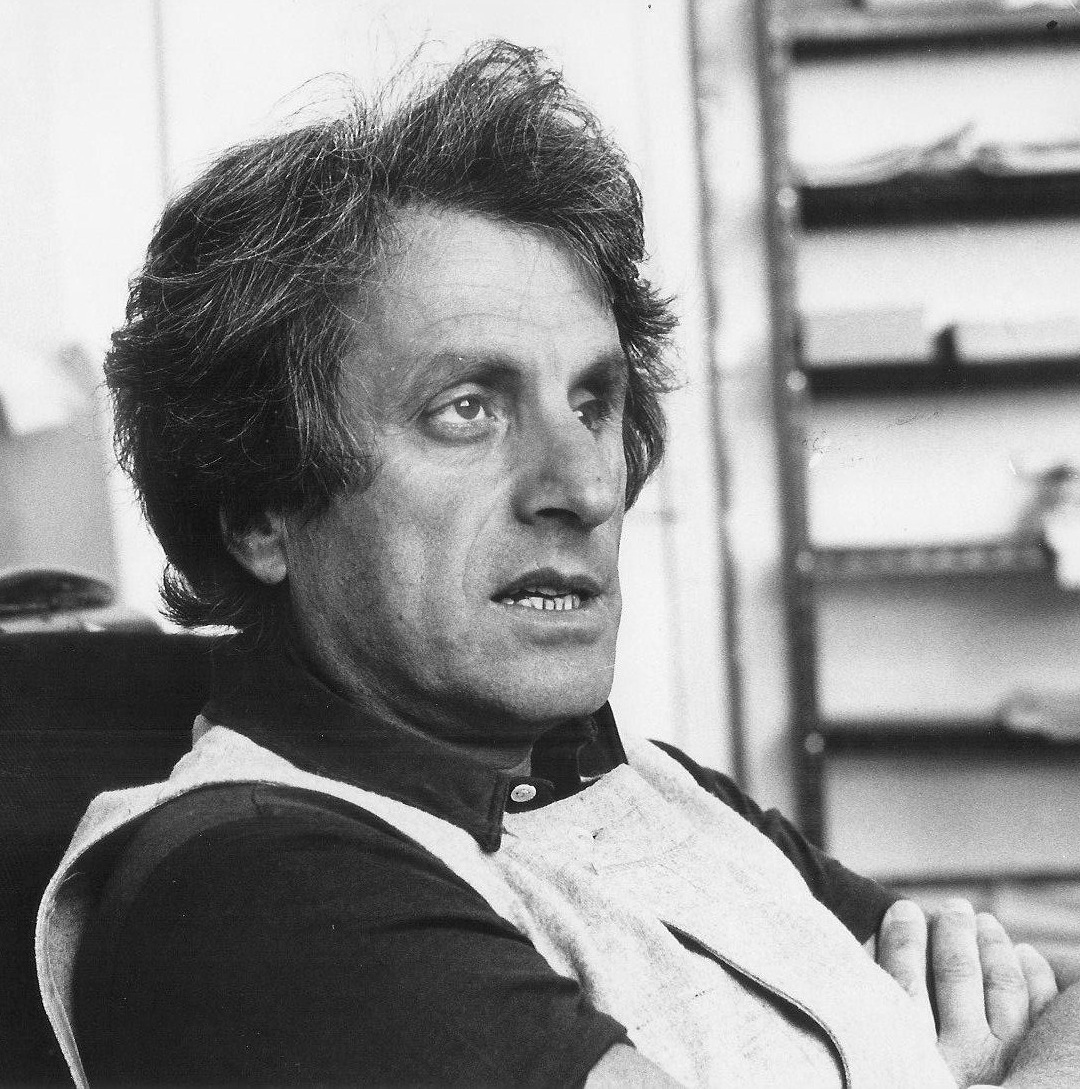
- Iannis Xenakis c. 1970
- Genre: Contemporary music
- Form: Ballet
- Composed: 1971: Bloomington — Paris
- Performed: 21 September 1974: Bonn
- Published: 1986: Paris
- Duration: 23 minutes
- Scoring: 86 (or 60) musicians

Antikhthon (Greek: Ἀντίχθων, which can be translated as Counter-Earth) is a ballet for orchestra composed by Iannis Xenakis in 1971.

== Composition ==
George Balanchine commissioned this composition in 1969, after having choreographed successfully two compositions by Xenakis in the past: Metastaseis and Pithoprakta, completed in 1955 and 1957 respectively. Even though these two compositions were not initially thought to be ballets, Xenakis already had previously written a ballet: Kraanerg, for orchestra and tape. Antikhthon was composed to be premiered by the New York City Ballet. As Xenakis puts it:

He left the choice of subject to me; I could write either program music with a plot or music without a story, i. e. abstract music. I chose this latter form, but I gave it a mysterious, evocative title, in order to convey to the choreographer a semblance of an argument that would be more "concrete" than pure musical thoughts.

— Iannis Xenakis, Notes on the orchestral score of Antikhthon

The Pythagorean term anti-khthon means Counter-Earth. This Greek term comes from the fifth or sixth century, when the Pythagoreans were the first people to assert that the earth is not the center of the universe. They believe that all the planets and stars, including a counter-earth which was invisible from the earth, revolved around a central invisible fire. According to Xenakis, his music displayed an involuntary affinity with these ideas.

The premiere of Antikhthon took place in Bonn, on the Festival Xenakis, on 21 September 1974, with the Festival Xenakis Orchestra conducted by Michel Tabachnik. The piece was later published by Éditions Salabert in 1986. George Balanchine, who commissioned the piece, never staged the ballet. Even though Xenakis felt deeply appealed by the idea of the Antikhthon, Balanchine was much more pragmatic about what he thought he could achieve, as he stated that it is limited to "the movements we can make with our limbs, our trunk and our head — and that's all. The vocabulary of ballet... is not rich".

== Structure ==
This composition is in only one movement and takes around 23 minutes to perform. The piece is score for an orchestra or either 86 or 60 musicians, with variations on the amount of performers in the string section. Some critics claim that the composition can be divided into five distinct sections. However, this division is not present nor recognizable in the original score.

Antikhthon is scored for three flutes, three oboes, three clarinets in B-flat, three bassoons, four French horns in F, three trumpets in C, three trombones, one tuba, timpani, two snare drums without snares, two sets of four tom-toms (8 in total), and a large string section. The composition also requires a special layout for the orchestra on stage. The orchestra has to be divided into five vertical sections, into which all the instruments, including the string section, are separated. The strings also have their own distribution norms.

Antikhthon is also remarkable for the clarinets' split sounds used along the whole piece. Clarinetists have to play up to four different techniques, entitled "Zones" by Xenakis, which alter and enrich their sonorities. The clarinet part annotations were set out by the Conservatoire de Paris clarinet professor and Xenakis's contemporary Guy Deplus. In the piece, some musicians are also asked to play quarter tones and also third tones.

== Recordings ==
- The New Philharmonia Orchestra under Elgar Howarth recorded this piece between 28 and 29 November 1975. The recording took place in Kingsway Hall, London, and was released by Decca in 1976 and again in 2013.
