= Palimpsest (Xenakis) =

Composition by Iannis Xenakis

- by Iannis Xenakis
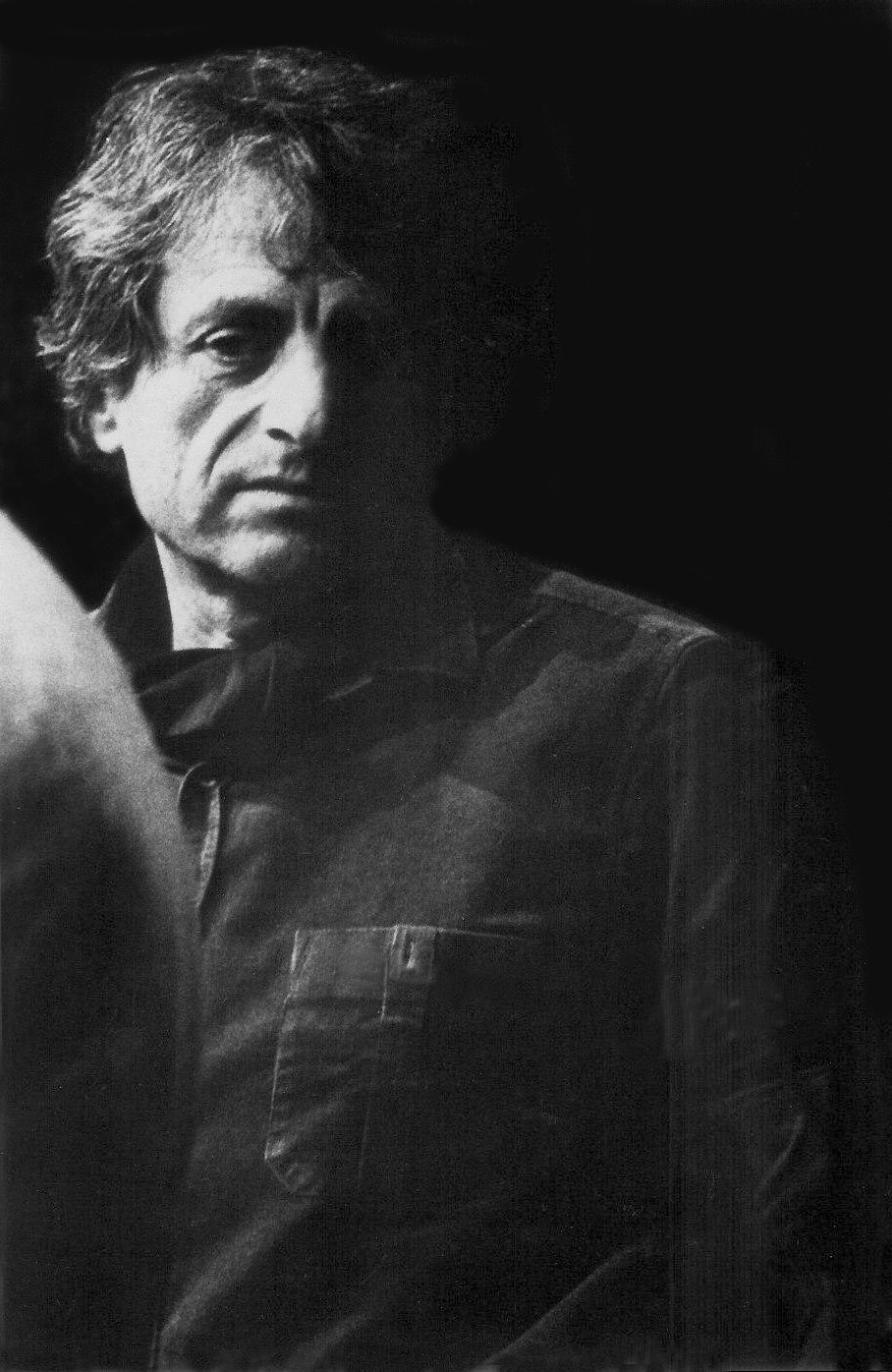
- Iannis Xenakis in 1975
- Composed: 1979
- Performed: March 3, 1979
- Published: 1986
- Publisher: Editions Salabert
- Recorded: 1986
- Duration: 11 minutes
- Movements: 1
- Scoring: Ensemble of eleven instrumentalists

Premiere
- Date: March 3, 1979
- Location: L'Aquila, Italy
- Conductor: Sandro Gorli
- Performers: Divertimento Ensemble

Palimpsest is a composition for chamber ensemble by Greek-French composer Iannis Xenakis. It was composed in 1979.

== Background ==
Palimpsest was a joint commission of the Accademia Filarmonica Romana, the Unione Musicale di Torino, the Società Aquilana dei Concerti, the Associazione Siciliana Amici della Musica di Palermo, and the Associazione Amici della Musica di Perugia. This marked Xenakis's first Italian commission. The title comes from the term palimpsest, referring to the process of scraping parchments with several superimposed text in order to find the meaning in different layers of writings; similarly, Xenakis uses that notion of layering in his compositional process, as he appears to have composed it by writing over an existing different text. Although the concept is present in the structure, Xenakis came up with the title only after the music was completed.

It was first performed at L'Aquila on March 3, 1979, by the Divertimento Ensemble conducted by Sandro Gorli, who also went on tour in several Italian cities in a programme also including Anaktoria and two other piece by Sylvano Bussotti. It was dedicated to Adriana Panni, the President of the Accademia Filarmonica Romana, and subsequently published by Editions Salabert in 1986.

== Structure ==
Palimpsest is scored for eleven musicians: an oboe (with an English horn), a B-flat clarinet (with a bass clarinet), a bassoon, a French horn in F, a piano, percussion (two bongos, one tumba, three tom-toms, and timpani), and a string quintet (first and second violins, a viola, a cello, and a double bass). It has a total duration of around eleven minutes and 126 bars.

The piece starts with a very difficult piano solo. The tempo is = 40 MM with some tempo changes along the piece, at a regular and unchanging 4/4. However, rapid thirty-second notes and triplets and complicated polyrhythmic patterns are common. Among the avant-garde techniques Xenakis used in Palimpsest are complex polyrhythmic structures, microtones, prominent glissandi, polyphonic arborescences, and timbral sound exploration. Though it is generally not classified as a double concerto, both the percussion and the piano parts are prominent and notable for their difficulty. For example, in the initial solo piano passage, the multilayered melodies have as many as four different simultaneous tempi. In this sense, arborescences are the main driving force, as all instruments employ this technique to a greater or a lesser extent.

Xenakis left instructions regarding on-stage layout. Musicians are required to sit in a curved line, almost semi-circular, facing the audience. The order is strictly as follows: bassoon, first violin, clarinet, cello, second violin, oboe, viola, double bass, and French horn. The piano and the percussionist are asked to be placed behind each one of the line's ends, both on the left side (piano) and the right side (percussion). No specifications for conductors were made, but it is common for conductors to be present in public performances.

== Recordings ==
As in the case of Phlegra, Palimpsest has only been recorded in a few occasions. The following is a list of recordings of this composition:

- The earliest recording available (and the only one made in the presence of the composer) is the one made in 1986 in Amsterdam with composer Huub Kerstens and an unnamed musical ensemble. Oboist Frank van Koten, clarinetist John Anderson, bassoonist Christ Bestley, hornist Hans Dullaert, violinists Mifune Tsuji and Nico Brandon, violist Ben Jolis, cellist Tadashi Tanaka, double bassist Thom de Ligt, pianist Aki Takahashi, and percussionist Johan Faber performed the piece for a recording that would later be released on compact disc by BV Haast Records in 2005.
- Conductor Guy Protheroe also recorded the piece that same year with the Spectrum ensemble, consisting of oboist Robin Canter, clarinet David Campbell, bassoonist Joanna Graham, hornist Philip Eastop, pianist Claude Helffer, percussionist Terence Emery, violinists Irvine Arditti and Richard Studt, violist Levine Andrade, cellist Rohan de Saram, and double bassist Barry Guy. The recording, taken in London, was released on compact disc in 1990 by Wergo
- Conductor Charles Zacharie Bornstein also recorded the piece with the ST-X Ensemble Xenakis USA, on May 30, 1997, at St. Peter's Church in Chelsea, New York City. The recording was released on compact disc in 1997 by Vanderburg Wave.
- Long-time champion Aki Takahashi performed the piece again with The Society of New Music with conductor Charles Peltz. The piece was performed by oboist Paige Morgan, clarinetist E. Michael Richards, bassoonist Lee Goodhew, hornist William Bernatis, percussionist Robert Bridge, violinists James Krehbiel and Lisa Hegyi, violist Deborah Moree, cellist Elizabeth Simkin, and double bassist Darrin Howell. The recording took place at the Cathedral of the Immaculate Conception, in Syracuse, New York, on April 5, 1998. It was later released by Mode Records on compact disc in 1999.
