= À r. =

Composition for piano by Iannis Xenakis

à r.
- (Hommage à Ravel)
- by Iannis Xenakis
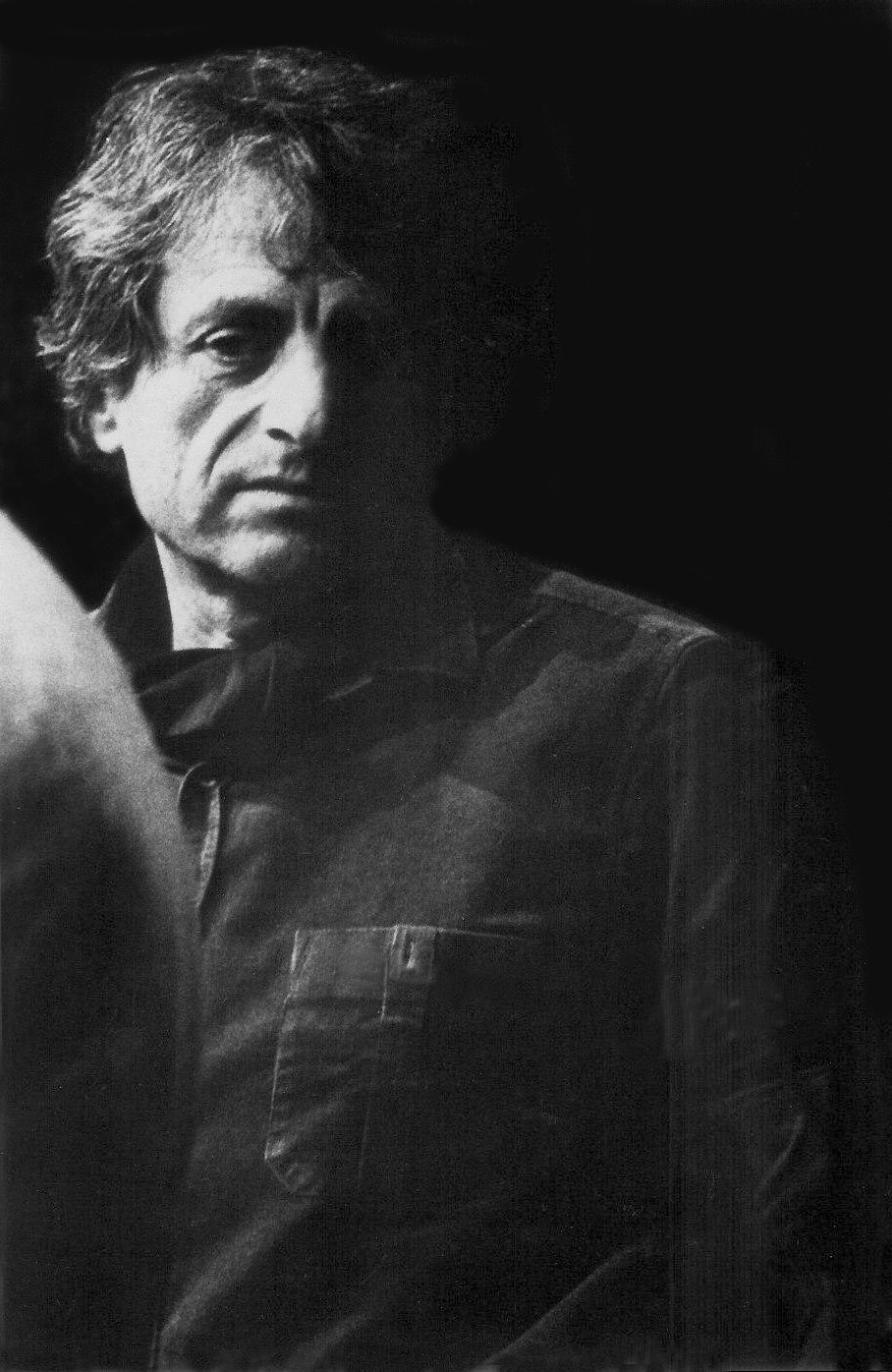
- Iannis Xenakis in 1975
- Year: 1987
- Period: Contemporary
- Occasion: 50th anniversary of Ravel's death
- Composed: 1987
- Dedication: Maurice Ravel
- Published: Paris — 1989
- Publisher: Éditions Salabert
- Duration: 3 minutes
- Movements: 1
- Scoring: Piano

à r., (Note: Because of the unusual nature of the title, many alternate spellings are used by record labels, musicologists, and publishers alike. Some of these alternate spellings include À r., À R., à R., A.R., A r., A R., and a R..) which usually includes the affix (Hommage à Ravel) (French for Homage to Ravel) for clarity, is a short composition for piano by Greek/French composer Iannis Xenakis. Composed in 1987, it is the last composition for solo piano by the composer.

== Background ==
The piece was composed in 1987 and premiered that same year, at the Festival International de Radio France, in Montpellier, France, on August 2, by pianist Håkon Austbø. Its title, à r., is a reference to "à Ravel", as the festival where it premiered marked the 50th anniversary of Ravel's death. The piece was published by Éditions Salabert in 1989.

== Structure ==
This short piece has a total duration of three minutes and is scored for solo piano. Only lasting for 21 bars, it features a characteristically slow tempo marking of ≃ 46 MM, implying that the tempo does not have to match the metronome marking exactly, but it has to approximate that tempo. As was usual in Xenakis, despite the slow tempo, long thirty-second note tuplet and sixty-fourth note passages are frequent, with sharp dynamic changes and isolated quarter notes and half notes. Also as customary in Xenakis, it is in standard 4/4, which does not necessarily mean that it follows a natural 4/4 rhythm, but rather that it can be used to make it easier to read — as most Xenakis works, the composition is very technically demanding and analytically complex.

This homage to Ravel bears a few distinctive, though not obvious, traits of Ravel's music, mainly the virtuosity and the brilliance of harmonic color. Xenakis uses, indeed, the whole range of the keyboard, constantly racing up and down and intersecting these passages with very complex chords or tone clusters. Stylistically, it represent late Xenakis's composition style fairly closely, and it can be compared to other chamber works of the same period, for example, Jalons (1986), XAS (1987), and Waarg (1988).

=== Analysis ===
The content used in à r. is formed by two different types of textures: on the one hand, random walks and, on the other hand, simultaneities. Simultaneities can be described as Xenakis's adaptation of the concept of a sound mass as a complex chord, which therefore creates a vertical block of timbral color. Random walks, on the contrary, are monodic lines the steps, direction, length, and other properties of which are governed entirely by chance, a feature that Xeankis first used in the solo violin composition Mikka (1971). The walks are always presented as two melodic lines, each one played by a different hand, except in certain passages, which present ambiguous textures where random walks are presented as chords (from measures 7-8 onwards), therefore blurring the line that draws a distinction between these two features. This was referred to by Ronald Squibbs as a "random walk of simultaneities".

The overall form of the piece is never dramatic nor does it follow any type of discursiveness. As many of other Xenakis's works, the piece lacks a sense of climax, tension, or descent, and is, thus, a piece with no narrative value. According to scholar Makis Solomos, the structures used in Xenakis's music "are simply there, like steep cliffs made out of heterogeneous blocks of stone". Squibbs, on the other hand, believes larger structural units can help the listener navigate the work. To determine the duration and specific pitches used in both textures, Xenakis used his own composition method, the "sieve theory", which helped him determine, through mathematical calculations and formulas instead of traditionally using harmonic relationships between sounds, every detail in his music, from note duration to dynamics. This, in turn, helped him create pitch-class sets, which are groups of notes to be used together.

In terms of temporal form structure, Xenakis admitted in the 90s that he did not follow specific patterns to determine the duration of structures, even if musicologists may arrive at conclusions that may be correct — unlike his work in the 50s, in which he used the Fibonacci sequence to determine the duration of structures in works such as Metastaseis, Xenakis did not make any such conscious decisions in his composition process in the 80s. It has been proposed by Squibbs that the temporal organization of the work was exclusively guided by simple proportional systems.

== Recordings ==
Piano	Date of recording	Place of recording	Label	Release date
Aki Takahashi	March 1998	Carnegie Mellon University, Pittsburgh	Mode Records	2006
