= Phlegra =

Phlegra most often refers to:

- Phlegra (mythology), a location in both Greek and Roman mythology
- Phlegra (spider), a large genus of jumping spiders

It may also refer to:

- Phlegra (Xenakis), a 1975 composition by Iannis Xenakis
