= Naama (Xenakis) =

Composition for amplified harpsichord

- Nάαμα
- by Iannis Xenakis
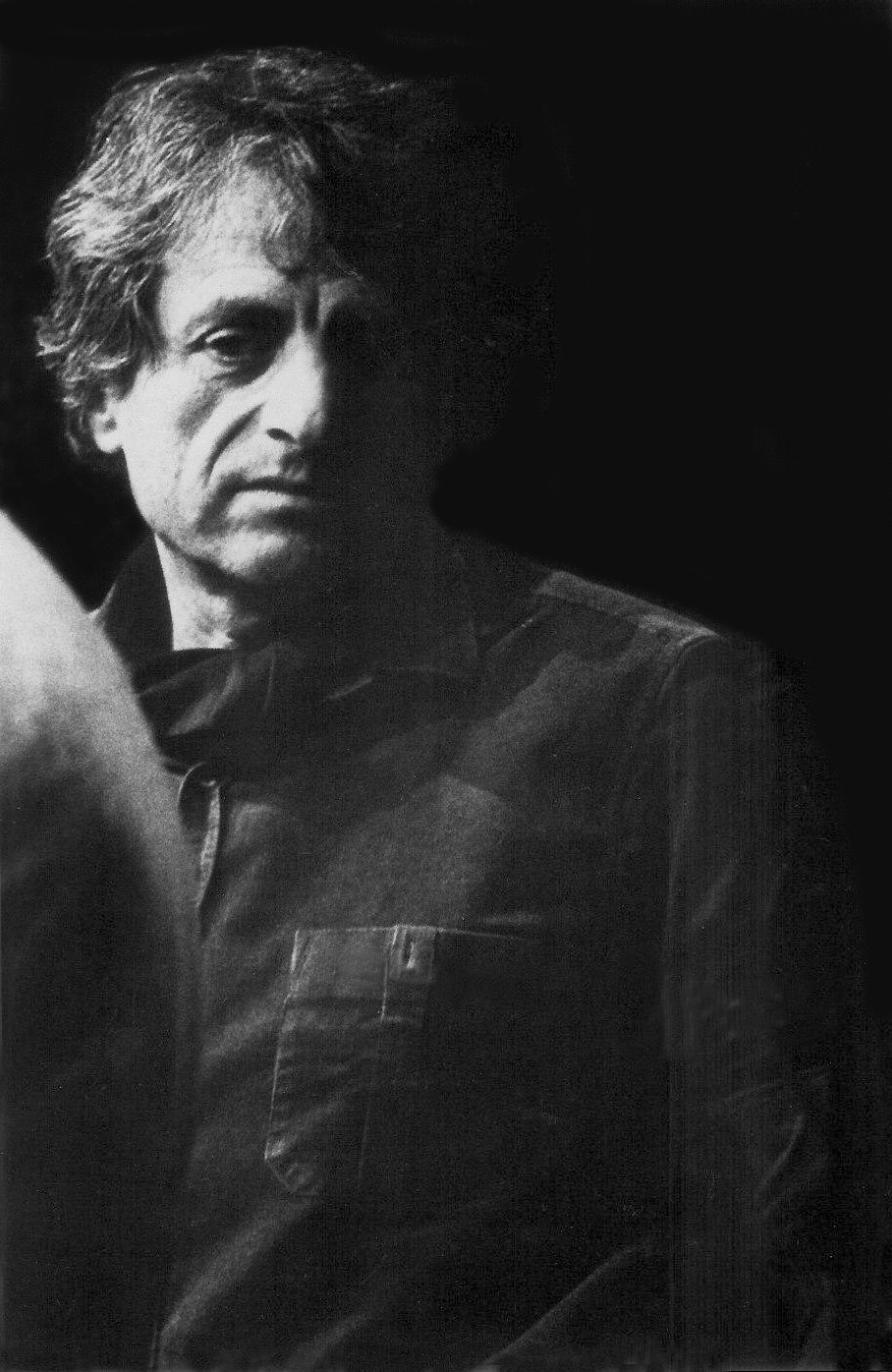
- Iannis Xenakis in 1975
- Dedication: Elisabeth Chojnacka
- Performed: May 20, 1984 - Luxembourg
- Published: Paris - 1984
- Publisher: Éditions Salabert
- Duration: 16 minutes
- Movements: 1
- Scoring: Amplified harpsichord

Naama (in Greek, Nάαμα) is a composition for amplified harpsichord by Greek/French composer Iannis Xenakis. Completed in 1984, it is the composer's last work for solo harpsichord.

== Background ==
Naama, which can be translated as "flow" or "flux", was commissioned by the Société Luxembourgeoise de Musique Contemporaine and the Cercle Littéraire des Communautés Européennes, at the instigation of Anise Koltz and Olivier Frank. The piece was completed in 1984 and was dedicated to long-time collaborator and virtuoso harpsichordist Elisabeth Chojnacka, who had also premiered other works by Xenakis and was also the dedicatee of Xenakis's first work for solo harpsichord, Khoaï. The premiere took place at RTL Studios, in Luxembourg City, on May 20, 1984, with Chojnacka at the harpsichord. The composition was published that same year by Éditions Salabert.

== Structure ==
This work is scored for amplified solo harpsichord and has a total duration of around 16 minutes in one movement. The piece is generally characterized by highly-contrasting sections, with very complex chords that, as in the case of other Xenakis's works, are akin to tone clusters. Rhythm is generally unpredictable, as it is determined by stochastic processes. As was customary in Xenakis, the piece employs a standard 4/4 time signature, even though the complexity of the rhythm indicates it is only used to make it easier to read and navigate. The tempo is also characteristically very slow ( ≥ 36 MM) with a few tempo changes; however, the fast-paced sixteenth and thirty-second note make it seem rhythmically jolty.

Unlike most other works for keyboard by Xenakis, Xenakis focuses on the percussive aspect of the instrument. The "flux" in the title refers to the navigation through the different levels of regularity and irregularity in the piece, as the piece is laid out as blocks of clearly defined and differentiated material. The differential factor can be either tempo, specific sets of chords used, limited register, etc. These different passages "flow" from one into the other, sometimes overlapping.

Xenakis describe the score as calling for "periodic constructions" realized thanks to a "group of hexahedral transformations as well as stochastic distributions". Thus, the flux of regularities and irregularities often happens on several planes at the same time, which requires virtuoso qualities from the performer and deep knowlefge of techniques that are specific to the harpsichord instead of any other keyboards. According to the dedicatée, Elisabeth Chojnacka, "it is as if he were writing for the two hands of a percussionist."

== Reception ==
Naama has been generally favorably by critics. Some have compared it to Nancarrow's player piano works, Bartók, and Messiaen's output from the 50s. Musicologist Zorica Premate wrote the following after a performance of various works by Xenakis, among which was Naama, which took place at the National Museum in Belgrade on April 24, 1985: "The pieces with their enormous internal expressiveness, extraordinary technical demands and untamed temper, left the performers and the audience nearly out of breath".

== Recordings ==
Harpsichord	Date of recording	Place of recording	Label	Release date
Elisabeth Chojnacka	June 1987	Radio France, Paris	Erato Records / Warner Classics	1990
Daniel Grossmann (MIDI programming)	2008	—	Neos	2008
