= Dikhthas =

- by Iannis Xenakis
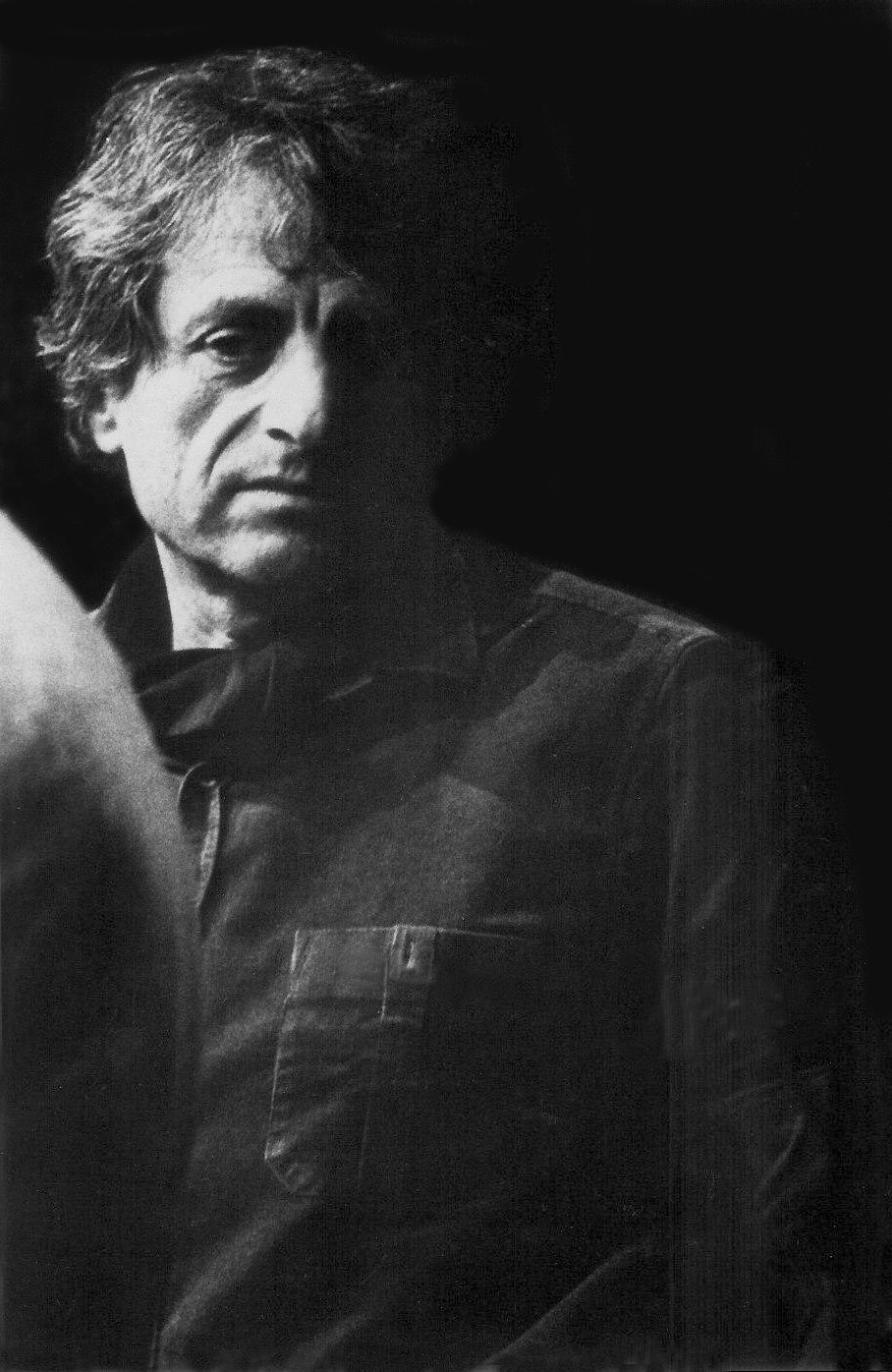
- Iannis Xenakis in 1975
- Native name: Διχθάς
- Year: 1979
- Style: Modern
- Occasion: 30th Beethoven Festival in Bonn
- Time: 4/4
- Dedication: Hans-Jürgen Nagel
- Performed: 1980
- Published: 1982 - Paris
- Publisher: Éditions Salabert
- Duration: 13 minutes approximately
- Scoring: Violin and piano

Dikhthas (from Greek, Διχθάς, meaning "dual" or "asunder") is a composition for violin and piano by composer Iannis Xenakis. Xenakis's only composition for violin and piano, it was completed in 1979.

== Background ==
Dikhthas was composed on commission from the city of Bonn, at the request of Hans-Jürgen Nagel, former director of the Bonn Conservatory and the administrator responsible for the city’s cultural and artistic projects between 1972 and 1980, for the 30th Beethoven Festival in 1980. It was finished in 1979 and premiered at the festival on June 4, 1980, performed by violinist Salvatore Accardo and pianist Bruno Canino. The work was dedicated to Nagel and was first published by Éditions Salabert in 1982.

== Structure ==
The composition is a duet for violin and piano. It lasts approximately twelve minutes, as indicated in the score, and comprises a total of 175 bars. The work is atonal and stochastic in character. It begins at a tempo of ♩ ≙ 46 MM, although this soon shifts to ♩ ≅ 80 MM at the violin’s entry, followed by frequent and sometimes abrupt tempo changes throughout. As in many works by Xenakis, no key or time signature is specified, although the music is largely notated in 4/4, to help the performers navigate it. The complexity of its notation is reflected in the performance indications provided by the composer. According to Xenakis's specification, the violinist is instructed to play "sul ponticello" in certain passages with an emphasis on upper harmonics, even completely concealing the fundamental, and to maintain a completely non-vibrato tone throughout the whole piece. Extended glissandi passages are guided by intermediate reference pitches that serve as points of orientation rather than notes of arrival. In addition, the metronome markings are approximate, indicating minimum tempi rather than fixed values.

Xenakis described the work as a “personage made up of two natures,” a formulation that reflects the meaning of the title as a division into two entities. These are represented by the two instruments, whose musical characters are conceived as fundamentally contrasting, even though they occasionally converge in rhythm or harmony. Their interaction unfolds as a kind of "confrontation", in which each instrument develops its own material and explores distinct technical possibilities. This contrast is particularly evident in the piano writing, which features dense clusters and highly complex polyrhythmic structures. The pianist is often required to articulate four or more simultaneous melodic strands at different rhythms, a texture Xenakis described as “arborescences” and employed extensively in other works. To accommodate this, the piano part is notated on three staves. By contrast, the violin part emphasizes timbral and microtonal variation, including double-stop glissandi, quarter-tones, and an assortment of other extended techniques in search of uncommon and unorthodox timbres.

== Recordings ==
Dikhthas is one of Xenakis's minor chamber compositions, but it has been recorded a few times. Here is a list of recordings of the piece:

Recordings of Xenakis's Dikhthas
Violin	Piano	Date of recording	Place of recording	Label	Notes
Irvine Arditti	Claude Helffer	1986	London, England, UK	Wergo	
Irvine Arditti	Claude Helffer	June 1991	Kulturzentrum Lindlar, Lindlar, Germany	Montaigne	
Jane Peters	Aki Takahashi	February 1999	Troy Music Hall, Troy, New York, USA	Mode Records	
Carolyn Widmann	Simon Lepper	December 2006	Kölner Funkhaus, Cologne, Germany	ECM	
Sarah Saviet	Joseph Houston	June 2024	Saal 3, Haus des Rundfunks, Berlin, Germany	Winter & Winter	
