= Theraps (Xenakis) =

- by Iannis Xenakis
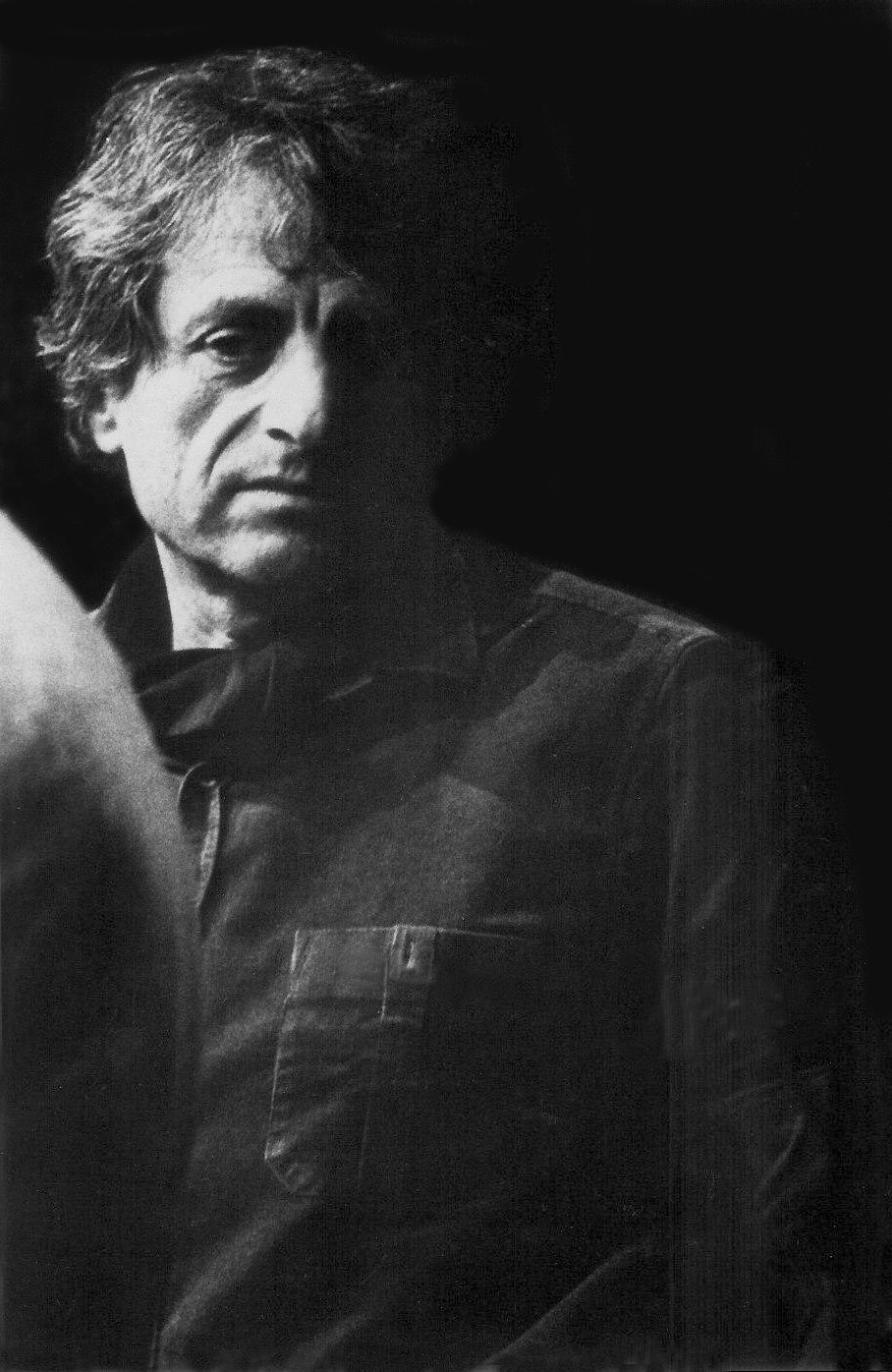
- Iannis Xenakis in 1975
- Composed: 1975–76
- Performed: March 26, 1976
- Published: 1976
- Movements: 1
- Scoring: Solo double bass

Theraps is a composition for solo double bass by Iannis Xenakis.

== Background ==
Theraps was composed during 1975–1976, and is dedicated to Fernando Grillo, who premiered it on March 26, 1976, at the Festival de Royan in Royan, France. The title signifies "achievement, level of conscience," and stems from the same root as "therapy." With a duration of 11 to 12 minutes, it is one of a group of small-scale works involving string instruments in which Xenakis explores continuously changing pitch curves (glissandi) derived from Brownian motion. Similar works from that time period are Charisma for clarinet and cello (1971), Mikka and Mikka "S" for solo violin (1971 and 1976), Kottos for solo cello (1977), and Embellie for solo viola (1981).

Theraps was published by Éditions Salabert in 1976. In 1981, Salabert published a new edition featuring modified tempo indications plus expanded instructions and notes. The score is notated at sounding pitch, rather than an octave higher, as is traditional with music for the double bass.

== Material and form ==
Theraps begins and ends with repeated descending glissandi that are loud, grinding, and brief. (The opening passage is marked "crushing the string.") The body of the piece consists of three types of music: single-note glissandi based on random walks; double-stop glissandi that often move in contrary motion; and slowly-changing double-stop natural harmonics. These texture types appear in various successions which, along with the movement of the registrally wide-ranging lines, constitute the form of the piece. The preface to the score states that the dynamic range should be as wide as possible, and stipulates that bowed sounds should be noisy.

== Performative considerations ==
Like many of Xenakis's compositions, Theraps poses many challenges for the performer, and requires a great deal of stamina. The music covers five octaves, and the player is required to produce quarter tones and quadruple-stop chords, in addition to the extremely difficult contrary motion double-stop glissandi.

Bassist and composer Barry Guy called the piece "an intense work, one that demands you throw yourself into it wholeheartedly," and stated that it "takes you to the limit of your physical capabilities." He recalled: "my whole bodily frame would be in a state of shock by the end... My right arm and left fingers would be shaking." However, he noted that he has "learned to control the muscular exertions," and commented: "if you go for it, it turns from being a piece that is slightly dry and cerebral to being a glorious piece of strength in music and expression."

Bassist Robert Black called Theraps "a masterpiece," and remarked: "It is intense, powerful, deep, and beautiful. It is transcendent. It is a gift from the 'gods'." He stated that, in preparation for playing it, he "devised a number of exercises (quasi-etudes) that would train my muscles and mind to do things they had not done before," and noted "the emotional commitment, and sheer physical effort required to play the work." He also recalled that, in his initial meeting with Xenakis, the composer urged him to make the music "much more extreme, savage, grotesque and beautiful." Black went on to record the work for Neuma Records.
