= Aroura =

Aroura may refer to:

- Arura, an Homeric word for earth, land
- Aroura (Xenakis), a 1971 composition for strings by Iannis Xenakis
- Bani Zeid al-Sharqiya, a Palestinian village
- Aroura, an Ancient Greek unit of area

== See also ==
- Aurora (disambiguation)
