= Aïs (Xenakis) =

Composition by Iannis Xenakis

- by Iannis Xenakis
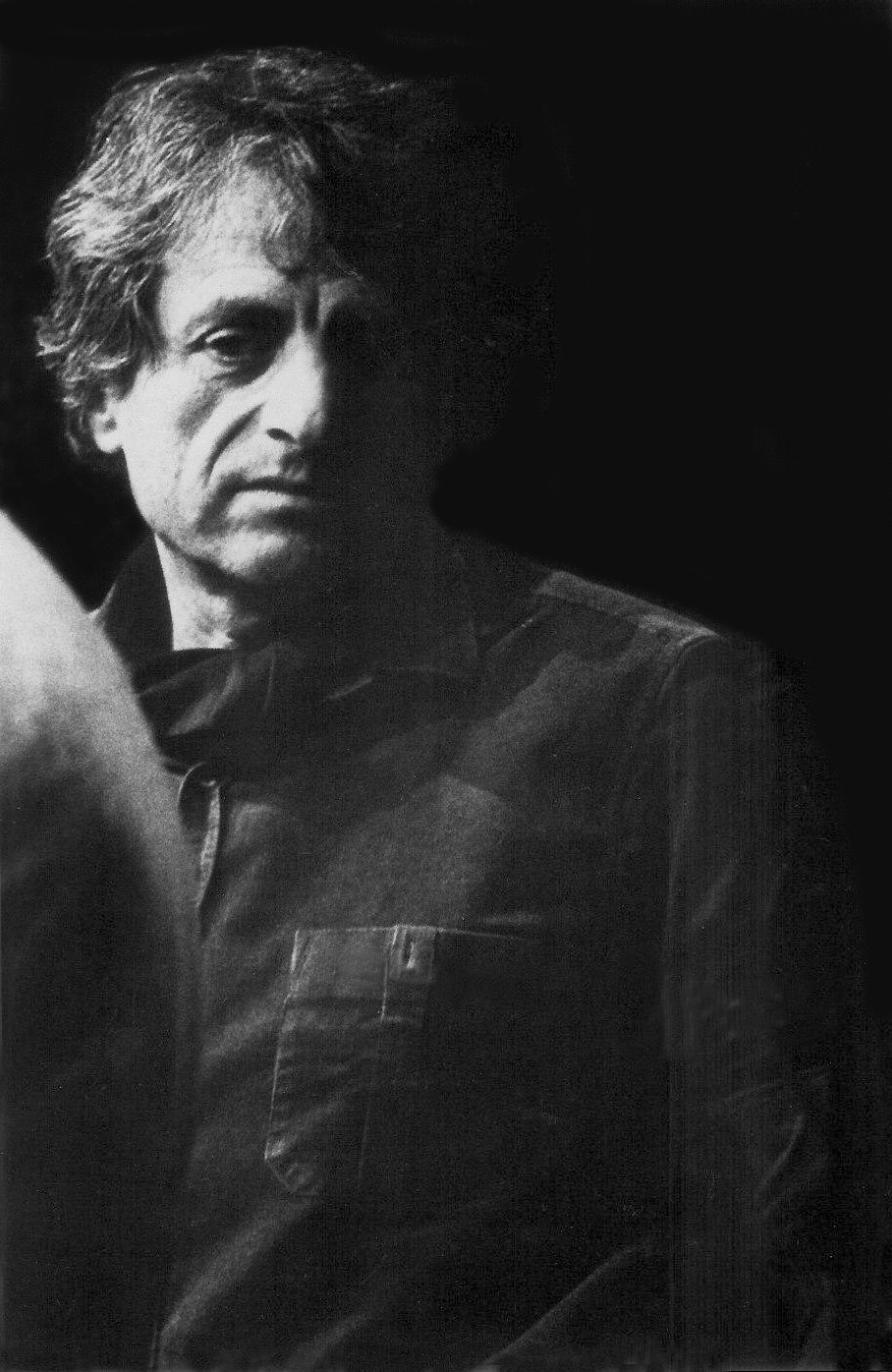
- Iannis Xenakis in 1975
- Text: Homer's Odyssey; Sappho's fragment 95; Homer's Iliad
- Composed: 1980
- Performed: February 13, 1981
- Published: 1988
- Movements: 1
- Scoring: Baritone, solo percussion, and large orchestra

Aïs is a composition for amplified baritone, solo percussion, and large orchestra by Greek composer Iannis Xenakis written in 1980.

== Composition ==
The title Aïs comes from Aidos, with which Xenakis references "the domain of the dead, [the] Hades of the shadows". It was commissioned by Bayerischer Rundfunk and finished in 1980. It then premiered on February 13, 1981, at the Herkulessaal der Residenz, at the Musica Viva festival. Baritone Spyros Sakkas and percussionist Sylvio Gualda gave the first performance with the Symphonieorchester des Bayerischen Rundfunks, with conductor Michel Tabachnik. It was then published by Éditions Salabert in 1988.

== Structure ==
Aïs is a single-movement piece for amplified baritone, solo percussion, and large orchestra. The orchestra is made up of 96 musicians in total: four flutes (fourth flute doubling piccolo), four oboes (fourth oboe doubling cor anglais, four clarinets in B-flat (fourth clarinet doubling clarinet in E-flat), fourth bassoons (fourth bassoon doubling contrabassoon), four French horns in F, four trumpets in C, four trombones, a tuba, a percussion section made up of twelve hanging cymbals, four bongos, eight tom-toms, and two bass drums, a piano, and a large string section, made up of sixteen first violins, fourteen second violins, twelve violas, ten cellos, and eight double basses. The percussion solo part plays a set of skins made up of a series of bongos, a tumba, three tom-tom, and a very deep bass drum, a glockenspiel, timpani, and two wood blocks.

The text used in Aïs is taken from three sources: Homer's Odyssey, chant XI, verses 36—37 and 205–208, where Ulysses visits the land of the dead; Sappho's fragment 95, where the writer mixes the desire to live with a nostalgia for death; and, finally, the Iliad, where the author recounts Patroclus's death. Xenakis's attempt to be faithful to the text is present in his specifications about phonetics and prosody, as he asks the performer to use ancient rhythms in the text and use presumed ancient phonetics. The baritone is also required to scream at specific spots in the piece, according to the markings cri horrible (horrible scream), cri d'airain (hoarse scream), cri éraillé (rasping scream), and cri rauque (rough scream) present in the score.

The depiction of death in Aïs, one of Xenakis's most dramatic works, is not morbid, but rather poetic and stylized. According to academic James Harley, Xenakis might had found inspiration in Spyros Sakkas when composing the piece, as Xenakis included cries and other elemental utterances between different text fragments. The text is meant to be sung in the low register of the baritone, with occasional interjections in the extreme falsetto range. For this reason, the piece calls for a three-octave range on the baritone part. The solo percussion part was also written in collaboration with fellow musician Sylvio Gualda.

The piece opens with a loud C5 played in the high register of the trombones. Then, the baritone joins in playing the same note followed by a cri horrible. and a series of arborescences by the strings. A series of cluster by the high woodwinds and fast glissandi in the strings ensues, and the introduction is then cut off at bar 38. The first extract of the Odyssey is played by the baritone in the next section, with the percussion, harmonics in the strings, and low bassons. The second extract comes when the percussion adds woodblocks to the drums and the strings start introducing melodies. After yet another scream by the baritone, an orchestral segment ensues from bars 76 to 90.

The Sappho section starts right after the interlude, with less regular rhythms, fast staccato, and tremolo. The fragment ends with an F4 by the baritone which is then taken over by the horns, which, after the percussion entry, leads the piece into the Illiad segment. After that last segment is finished, the concluding segment takes the piece to its end, gradually fading out on a sustained chord, with outbursts both by the voice and the percussion.

== Recordings ==
- The world premiere of Aïs was recorded and released under Col Legno on compact disc in 2003.
