= Jean-Pierre Guézec =

French composer (1934–1971)

Jean-Pierre Guézec (19 August 1934 – 9 March 1971) was a French composer.

== Life ==
Born in Dijon, Guézec studied music at the Conservatoire de Paris with Darius Milhaud, Jean Rivier and Olivier Messiaen. He also worked with Iannis Xenakis. His very personal language is influenced by the techniques of modern painting, in particular those of Mondrian and Vasarely. His research led him to compose works in which the contrasts of sound materials and a very original sense of colour dominate, as evidenced by the title of his works. From 1969 to 1971, he held an analysis class at the Conservatoire de Paris until his early death at the age of 36 in Paris.

Xenakis dedicated his 1971 composition Charisma to Guézec.

=== Awards ===
- Musical composition prize of the 1963 Tanglewood Music Center.
- Grand Prix for the symphonic promotion of the SACEM in 1968

=== Principal compositions ===
- Concert for main violin and 14 instruments (1960)
- Concert en 3 parties, for percussion and 10 musicians (1961)
- Trois poèmes de Henri Michaux, for voice and piano (1961)
- La Loreley, on a theme by Guillaume Apollinaire for soprano, baritone, narrator and orchestra (1961)
- Suite pour Mondrian, 7 parts to play in any order, for 73 musicians (1963)
- Architectures colorées, for ensemble of 15 musicians (1964)
- Cinq pièces pour orchestre et ensemble vocal, for 3 soprani, 3 alti, 3 tenors, 3 basses and orchestra (1964)
- Ensemble multicolore, for an ensemble of 18 musicians (1965)
- Formes, for 92 musicians (1966)
- Saül, musical radio illustration on lyrics by André Gide, for octet (1966)
- Textures enchaînées, for instrumental ensemble (1967)
- Assemblages, for 28 musicians (1967)
- Trio pour violon, alto et violoncelle (1968)
- Successif-simultané, for 12 strings (1968)
- Forme-Couleurs, for 2 main harps and 9 musicians (1969)
- Reliefs polychromés, for 12 real vocal parts (1969)
- Onze pour cinq, for 5 percussionists (1970)

== Sources ==
- Dictionnaire de la musique française, Larousse, Marc Vignal
