= Khoaï (Xenakis) =

Khoaï Χοαί
- by Iannis Xenakis
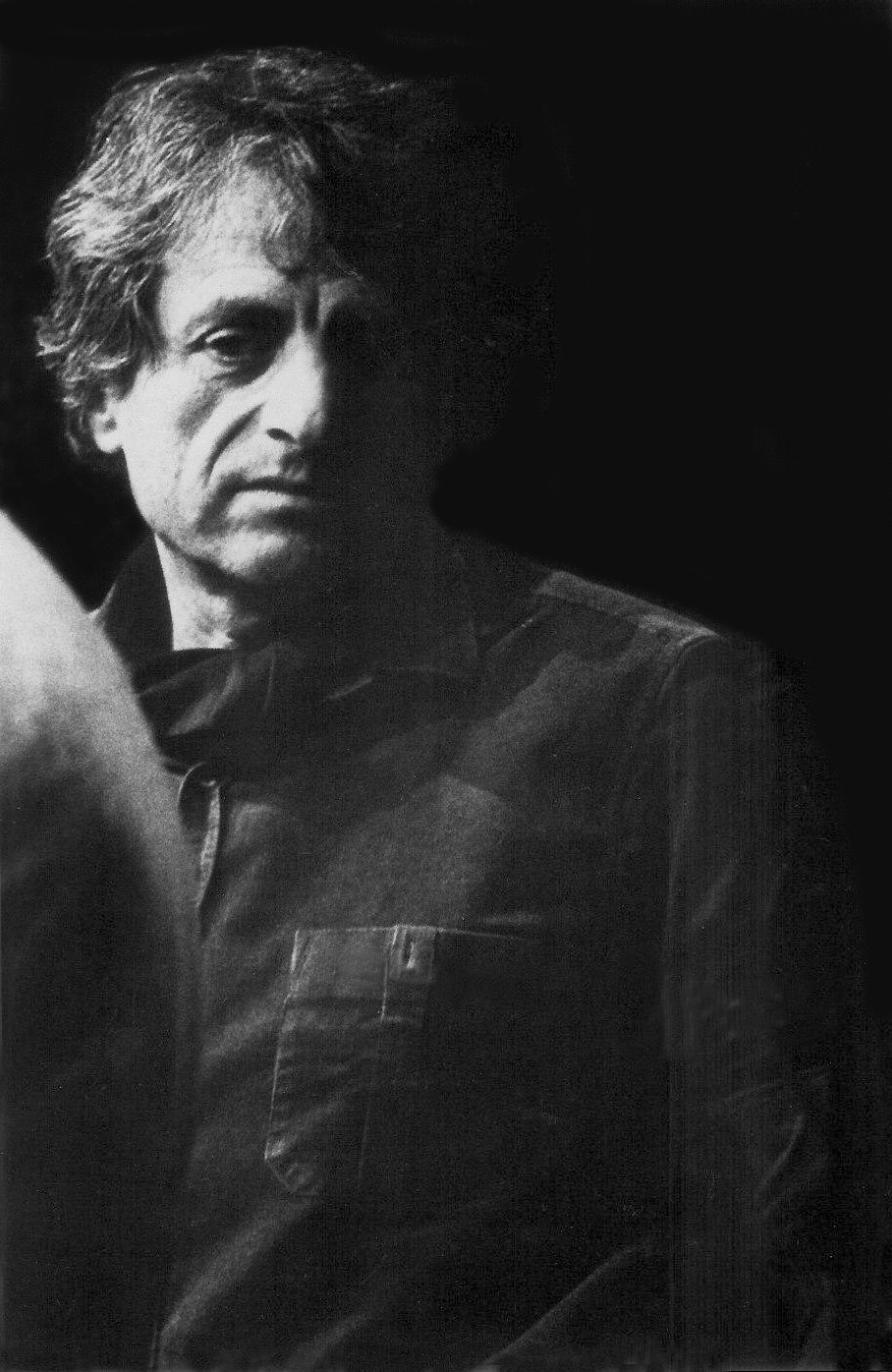
- Iannis Xenakis
- Composed: 5 May 1976
- Performed: 15 May 1976: Cologne
- Published: 1976: Paris
- Scoring: Harpsichord

Khoaï, also referred to by its original Greek title, Χοαί, is a 1976 composition for solo harpsichord by Iannis Xenakis.

== Background ==
Khoaï was written in one of Xenakis's most prolific periods, not only as a composer, as he composed four chamber works only in 1976, but also as a lecturer, as he traveled around the world and was present in many performances. The title refers to "offerings of wine or water poured into the ground; libations and vows to the Chthonians (infernal Gods)". It was written in a period where the harpsichord was gaining momentum as a concert instrument, popularized by some Polish virtuosos such as Wanda Landowska and the dedicatee of this piece, Elisabeth Chojnacka, who collaborated frequently with Xenakis throughout most of his career. Khoaï was the first in a series of commissions entitled "Musik der Zeit", made by the Westdeutscher Rundfunk in Cologne.

This piece was finished on May 5, 1976, in Cologne. There are very little details about the first public performance of Khoaï, although it is known to have been performed by Chojnacka on May 15, 1976. In 1980, Xenakis said that he had heard Chojnacka play works by François-Bernard Mâche and Luc Ferrari and he "sensed that she had the powers needed" to overcome the technical, psychological and poetic challenges of the piece and "that was why I composed this work for her and dedicated it to her". The piece was published that year by Éditions Salabert and was recorded a few years later by the dedicatee.

== Structure ==
Khoaï is scored for solo harpsichord and has a total duration of around 15 minutes. It has a total of 331 bars and has an initial tempo marking of ♩ ≧ 96 MM. It is an extremely complex and difficult work, with many arborescent structures and rapid repetitions of individual notes, a method Xenakis also explored in Synaphaï. Some passages are written in six different staves for both hands. The performer is sometimes also asked to play on both keyboards at once and to change from one register to another with their feet instantaneously. The lute stop is used frequently and clashes of rhythm (for example, 7/8 against 9/8) are also common. A demanding piece, Khoaï requires a large amount of stamina on the part of the performer.

I had a month to prepare for Khoai, and was close to a nervous breakdown because of the difficulty of reading the piece. At first sight, everything seemed impossible. But then the difficulties appeared to me rather at the "limits" of what is possible.

— Elisabeth Chojnacka, on performing Khoaï.

== Reception ==
The dedicatee, Elisabeth Chojnacka, who also gave the piece its first public performance, said she was "completely panic-stricken by its fiendish notation" when she first received the score, despite having worked closely with Xenakis on the practicality and possibilities of the harpsichord as an instrument.

== Recordings ==
Being one of Xenakis's most difficult pieces for harpsichord, it has been recorded by only a few virtuosos:

- Elisabeth Chojnacka first recorded the piece in a recital given in the Salon Honorrat, at the Cité Universitaire in Paris, in January 1979. The live recording was released by Erato on LP in 1980.
- Elisabeth Chojnacka recorded the piece again in a studio recording in June 1987, at Studio 107, Radio France. The recording was released in 1990 on compact disc by Erato and was later reissued by Erato in 2000 and by Warner Classics under its Apex series in 2007.
- Jukka Tiensuu recorded the piece for Finlandia Records at the Puotila Chapel, in Helsinki. The recording was released in 1987.
- Conductor Daniel Grossmann sequenced a MIDI version of the piece between 2005 and 2008. It was released on compact disc by Neos in 2008.
