= Six chansons pour piano =

Six chansons pour piano is a short piano suite and one of the earliest completed compositions by Greek composer Iannis Xenakis. It was composed between 1950 and 1951 and dedicated to Bernard Le Floc'h.

== Composition ==
Xenakis composed this suite for solo piano during his studies in Paris, with Darius Milhaud and Olivier Messiaen. However, because Xenakis always considered Metastaseis his first composition from which he would start his career as a musician, this work remained unpublished and unknown. This work was eventually published and premiered in 2000, at the 17th Rencontres Musicales de Pont-l'Abbé, by Georges Pludermacher.

== Structure ==
The suite consists of six pieces and takes approximately 10 minutes to perform:

- I. ΜΟΣΚΟΣ ΜΥΡΙΖΕΙ... (Ça sent le musc...)
- II. Είχα μια αγάπη κάποτε... (J'avais un amour autrefois...)
- III. Μια πέρδικα κατέβαινε... (Une perdrix descendait de la montagne...)
- IV. Τρείς καλογέροι κρητικοί... (Trois moines crétois...)
- V. Σήμερα μαύρος ουρανός... (Aujourd'hui le ciel est noir...)
- VI. ΣΟΥΣΤΑ (Sousta, danse)

At the time of writing it, Xenakis stated that he was trying to find his cultural roots: "I was trying to find my identity, and my Greek origins suddenly became important to me; the example of Mussorgsky and Bartók warned me that I had to understand and love Greek folk music". Therefore, this suite features plenty of Romanian and Greek folk elements.

The first movement's title alludes to the musk and is a monothematic and simple movement in the Aeolian mode, but it shows the style of a theme and variations; counterpoint is clearly visible throughout the entire movement and the presence of second, fourth and fifth intervals is evident. The fourth movement is apparently based on the Greek folksong Three Cretan Monks and has many meter and rhythm changes. The sixth movement are a Cretan dance in 2/4 time, with a strong presence of dissonant chords and trills.
