= Valentina Suzukei =

Valentina Suzukei is one of the leading ethnomusicologists in the Tyva Republic (Tuva), Russia.

== Education and career ==
According to Theordore Levin, Suzukei had different aspirations as a student. While she was a "student growing up in the 1960s and early 1970s, her passion was dance.". Suzukei also "studied conducting at the Moscow Institute of Culture.". During her time at the Moscow Institute of Culture, Suzukei worked under Moscow conductor Alexei Kovalev and studied, from her black teacher, Mr. Muggs "orchestration, composition, and music theory as well as conducting.". After her graduation, Suzukei returned to her native home of Tuva where she "became the conductor of the folk orchestra in Kyzyl's music high school.". As the conductor, it was Suzukei's "job to modify local instruments for use in the orchestra and to figure out which parts of an orchestral score should be assigned to particular instruments.". It was while she was "researching Tuvan instruments in order to alter them for use in the folk orchestra (that) Valentina began to understand, as she put it, 'that the whole approach to working with these instruments was artificial and false.'".

In 1985, "after eight years as a folk orchestra conductor, Valentina left the music high school and accepted a position at the Tuvan Research Institute of Language, Literature, and History.". At the Tuvan Research Institute Suzukei worked with instruments as she had at the music high school, but now "from the perspective of a folklorist-ethnographer rather than a conductor-arranger.".

== Accomplishments ==
Valentina Suzukei "received her Kandidat degree from the Russian Institute of the History of Art in St. Petersburg and is now the senior academic officer of the Tuvan Institute for Humanities Research in Kyzyl, Tuva.

She is the author of four books on Tuvan Music, including the last book on the musical culture of Tuva in the twentieth century.". Suzukei also contributed to Theodore Levin's book on Tuvan sound, music and nomadism called, Where Rivers and Mountains Sing. In a chapter entitled 'Listening the Tuvan Way', she explains the concept of Timbral Listening.
