= Metastaseis and Pithoprakta =

Ballet by George Balanchine

Metastaseis and Pithoprakta is a ballet by New York City Ballet co-founder and ballet master George Balanchine to two orchestral works by Iannis Xenakis: Metastaseis, written 1953–54, and Pithoprakta, written 1955–56. The premiere took place 18 January 1968, at the New York State Theater, Lincoln Center with lighting designed by Ronald Bates.

== Casts ==
=== Original ===
- Metastaseis

and 22 women

and 6 men

- Pithoprakta

- Suzanne Farrell

and 7 women

- Arthur Mitchell

and 5 men

=== Revivals ===
==== Suzanne Farrell Ballet ====
- Pithoprakta

===== Washington DC 2007 =====
- t.b.a.

===== New York City Center 2008 Fall for Dance festival =====
- t.b.a.

== Articles ==
- Washington Post, November 16, 2007

== Reviews ==
- NY Times by Don McDonagh, January 19, 1968
- NY Times by Donal Henahan, January 19, 1968
- NY Times by Clive Barnes, January 22, 1968
- NY Times by Alastair Macaulay, November 27, 2007
- Washington Post, November 16, 2007
- Ballet, November, 2007
