= Anastenaria (Xenakis) =

Anastenaria is a triptych cycle of compositions for SATB chorus, male chorus and orchestra by Greek composer Iannis Xenakis. It is, also, one of his most successful early compositions. The three movements of this cycle were composed between 1952 and 1954.

== Composition ==
After winning the first prize in the Bucharest Music Festival in 1953 for La colombe de la paix, one of his unpublished works, Xenakis decided to complete the first and the second movement of his Anastenaria trilogy, strongly influenced by his Greek roots. He was then studying with Arthur Honegger, Darius Milhaud and, most especially, with Olivier Messiaen, who even made several changes to the original conception of this work.

== Conception ==
Xenakis claimed that the work is based on a Greek Ritual which, after Constantine the Great, it has been reinterpreted to be a Christian ritual. In this ritual, Xenakis distinguishes up to three different phases:

- Phase A: the procession of the priests, the "Anastenarides", and the crowds from several villages, thus performing a ritual in which the ceremony is centered on instrumental and choral music. The priest say prayers while the Anastenarides ladle out holy water for the people to drink or to wash themselves with.
- Phase B: On the evening before 21 May, a holy steer is brought from the fields to the church. A huge fire is lit out on the church square and the Anastenarides dance effusively on hot coals with their bare feet, as part of the ritual.

Xenakis decided not to compose the third phase, in which the steer blessed by Orthodox priest is sacrificed on 21 May.

== Analysis ==
This work consists of three movements, which are often performed individually. The movement list is as follows:

1. Procession aux eaux claires, for large orchestra, SATB chorus of 30 voices and male chorus of 15 voices (1952/1953)
2. Le sacrifice, for large orchestra (1953)
3. Metastaseis, for 61 solo instruments (1953/54)

The first movement is largely tonal, unlike the rest of the work. According to Hans Rudolf Zeller, the divisi in the choral parts create musical phenomena of mass resulting from the individualization of the leading voice. It is also based on the principle of overlapping, which makes each voice to proceed from its own melodic, harmonic or rhythmic personality.

The second movement, which treats the evening before the sacrifice, is conceived purely instrumentally; this movement is clearly closer to the style of his contemporaries. However, from this movement on, Xenakis would no longer be constrained by serial techniques, and would explore his musical viewpoints and perspectives by using glissandos and discontinuous pitches.

The third movement was the result of this change, even though it would still not be considered stochastic music, which Xenakis would explore further in Pithoprakta. However, Xenakis removed completely any trace of serial music and started working to bring his vocal compositions to the same level as that of his instrumental and electroacoustic compositions. According to the composer himself, the third movement was separated from the rest because it was "such a step forward".
