= Charisma (Xenakis) =

- by Iannis Xenakis
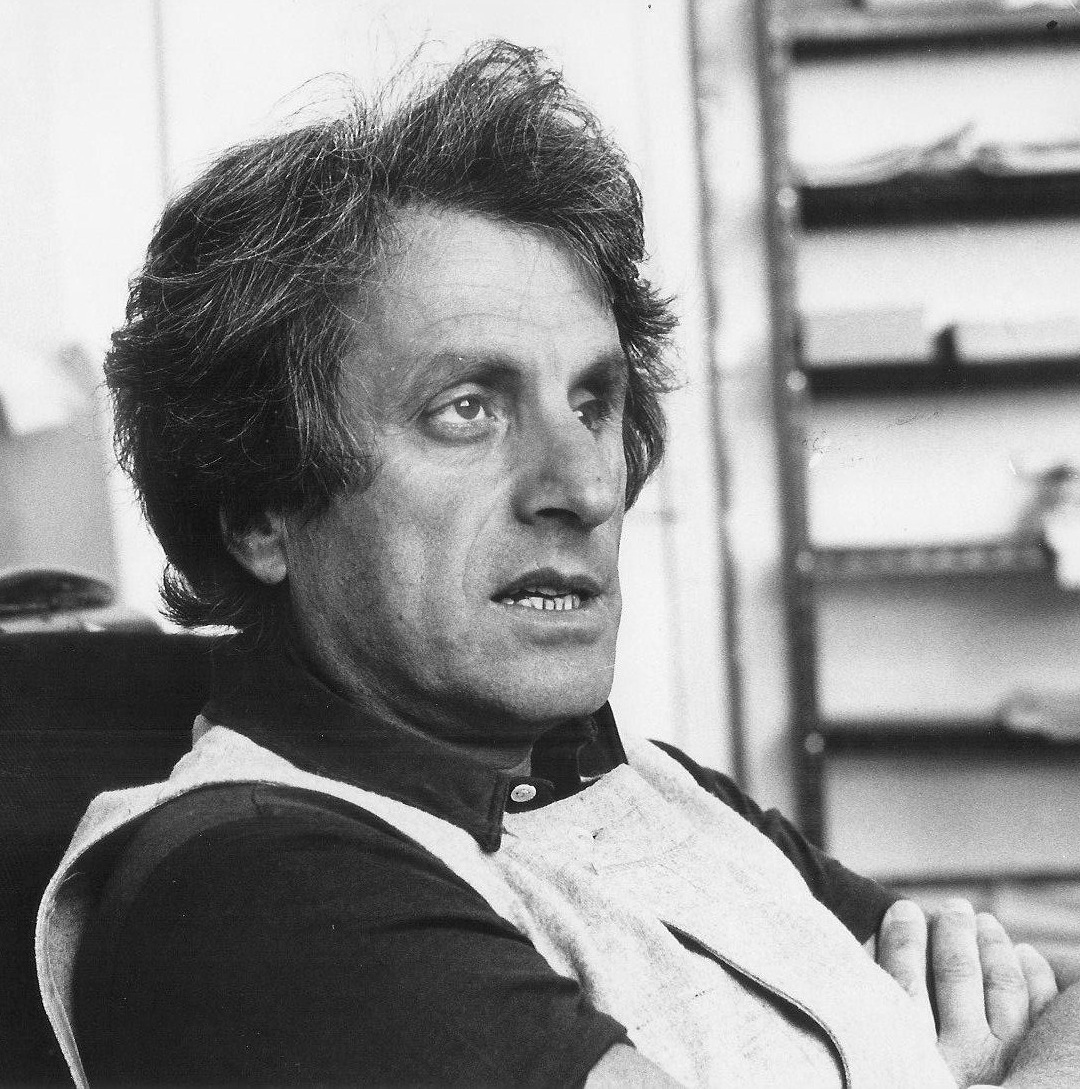
- Iannis Xenakis in his Paris studio, c. 1970
- Composed: 1971
- Performed: April 6, 1971
- Published: 1971
- Movements: 1
- Scoring: Clarinet and cello

Charisma is a composition for clarinet and cello by Iannis Xenakis.

== Background ==
Charisma for clarinet and cello was composed in 1971, and has a duration of about four minutes. It is dedicated to the memory of composer Jean-Pierre Guézec, who had been a student of Xenakis at Tanglewood in 1963, and who died at the age of 36. At the top of the score is a quote from the Iliad: "then the soul like smoke moved into the earth, grinding." According to Xenakis, the quote describes "the death of Patroclos and how his young soul entered the earth weeping for the fatal issue and for the loss of youth and power." The composer noted that the music is not a mere illustration of the text, commenting: "Poetry and music form a sort of epitaph to the memory of the young composer..."

Charisma was published by Éditions Salabert in 1971, and was premiered at the Festival de Royan in Royan, France on April 6, 1971, roughly one month after Guézec's death, by clarinetist Guy Deplus and cellist Jacques Wiederker.

== Material and form ==
For the most part, the piece is composed of sonorities of long duration, with widely-ranging dynamics and timbral properties, surrounding a central outburst of more active material. In his analysis of the work, theorist Michael Boyd identified its core oppositions as those of "noisy vs. harmonic timbres," as well as "constant vs. contoured dynamic envelopes," and suggested that Charisma "ultimately gravitates toward noise as it unfolds."

== Performative considerations ==
Like many of Xenakis's works, Charisma is extremely challenging for the performers. Cellist Christophe Roy recalled that he and clarinetist Dominique Clément "sweated on this work, which lasts 4 minutes and in which there are only twenty sounds to play, for a whole year before getting what we wanted!" A wide range of extended techniques and timbral effects are employed. There are no tempo markings; instead, durations of sections are indicated in units of time.

The clarinetist is asked to execute wide registral leaps, as well as quarter tones, some in extreme registers, and multiphonics. In addition, they must transition slowly from one sound to another; an example is found on page 1 of the score over a sustained A natural: "trill to start with B natural slowly, then accelerate and simultaneously lower the B natural towards the A, passing through a very large pitch vibrato, then change progressively into a flutter on A, then play a smooth A." Multiphonics are played in four different "zones" or "regions," played with the same fingering but with changes in embouchure; detailed instructions on how to produce these were written by Guy Deplus at the request of the composer, and are included in the preface to the score. The work ends with repeated "noise of the clarinet keys by closing them." Clarinetist Lori Freedman compared the music to a tapestry, and stated that she "invent[s] compounds of colors that come and go in a maze of timings (textures) that are somehow built by the content within the colors themselves."

The cellist is also asked to produce a wide range of sounds, including quarter tones, artificial harmonic glissandi, and glissandi over many octaves. In a number of places, they are asked to grind with the bow near the bridge, producing a noisy sonority. Near the end of the piece, the cellist must detune the instrument's lowest string by over an octave, then violently bow the string, producing what the composer calls "electronic sounds."

The score also features a number of passages in which the instruments play sustained unison pitches, with the clarinetist slowly raising and lowering their pitch in order to create beating effects. Clarinetist Alain Damiens remarked that, while preparing the work, he "noticed that Xenakis managed to make a whole system of beats, those vibratos you hear when you play extremely lightly... you could feel an incredible sound vibration."
