= Timbral listening =

Timbral listening is the process of actively listening to the timbral characteristics of sound.

== Concept ==
In timbral listening, "pitch is subordinate to timbre". Instead, the specific quality of a musical tone is determined by considering "the presence, distribution and relative amplitude of overtones."

When using this listening technique/ method of perception / interpretation there is "a relation between timbre and spectral content which is analogous to that between pitch and frequency in that one is the prevalent cultural construct of the other."

The most common form of timbral listening is listening to speech. This is demonstrated by listening to, for example, the vowels /a/ and /i/ spoken at the same pitch and intensity. The difference between the two sounds is entirely one of spectrum, or as the term is used in this article, timbre.

== Nature ==
It has been suggested that "timbral listening is an ideal sonic mirror of the natural world". It is often (but not always) used in association with musics that are based in mimicry of sounds in the natural environment. Valentina Suzukei suggests that 'it was the nomadic way of life and its focus on the timbral qualities of natural sounds that created this kind of musicality'. This is especially prevalent in Canada where composers such as Hildegard Westerkamp apply the thinking of R. Murray Schafer's World Soundscape Project to their compositions.

== Descriptive language and notation ==
As timbre has "no domain-specific adjectives" it "must be described in metaphor or by analogy to other senses". This method also has limitations.

== Examples ==
=== Traditional music in Tuva and other Turkic cultures of inner Asia ===
The composition of timbre-centered music in the nomadic communities of Tuva involves mimicry of sounds heard in the environment. Timbral listening is a fundamental component of listening to, understanding and being able to correctly perform this music using vocal techniques such as throat singing "khoomei" and harmonic producing instruments such as the jaw harp, bzaanchy, shoor, qyl qiyak, qyl-gobyz, ku-rai, and igil.

=== Barundi whispered Inanga or Inanga Chucotée in Africa ===
This music employs a fundamental drone and overtone harmonics. It consists of "a whispered text, accompanied by the inanga, a trough zither of eight strings. To listen correctly (using timbral listening), one must consider "the effect of the combined timbres of the noisy whisper and the inanga" as a whole sound.

=== Some forms of contemporary electronic music ===
More recently, computers and synthesizers are being used by contemporary composers to produce timbral-centered music. Contemporary composers state timbral listening as the correct technique to adopt in listening to and analysing their timbre (as opposed to pitch) based compositions. In the context of electronic music, the approach of spectromorphology provides ways to describe the temporally shifting nature of timbre, following an article by Denis Smalley named Spectromorphology explaining sound shapes (1997). 'Pure timbres' are explored using methods such as granular synthesis in works such as Dragon of the Nebula by Mara Helmuth.

=== Shakuhachi music in Japan ===
The music produced by the Shakuhachi end blown flute such as honkyoku, contains timbral variations that are of equal importance to pitch variations. These timbral variations are indicated in Shakuhachi musical notation.

== Application ==
The technique of timbral listening is used by sound engineers to evaluate timbre differences.

== See also ==
- Spectral music
- Sound mass
- Timbre recognition
