= Aroura (Xenakis) =

1971 string composition by Iannis Xenakis

- by Iannis Xenakis
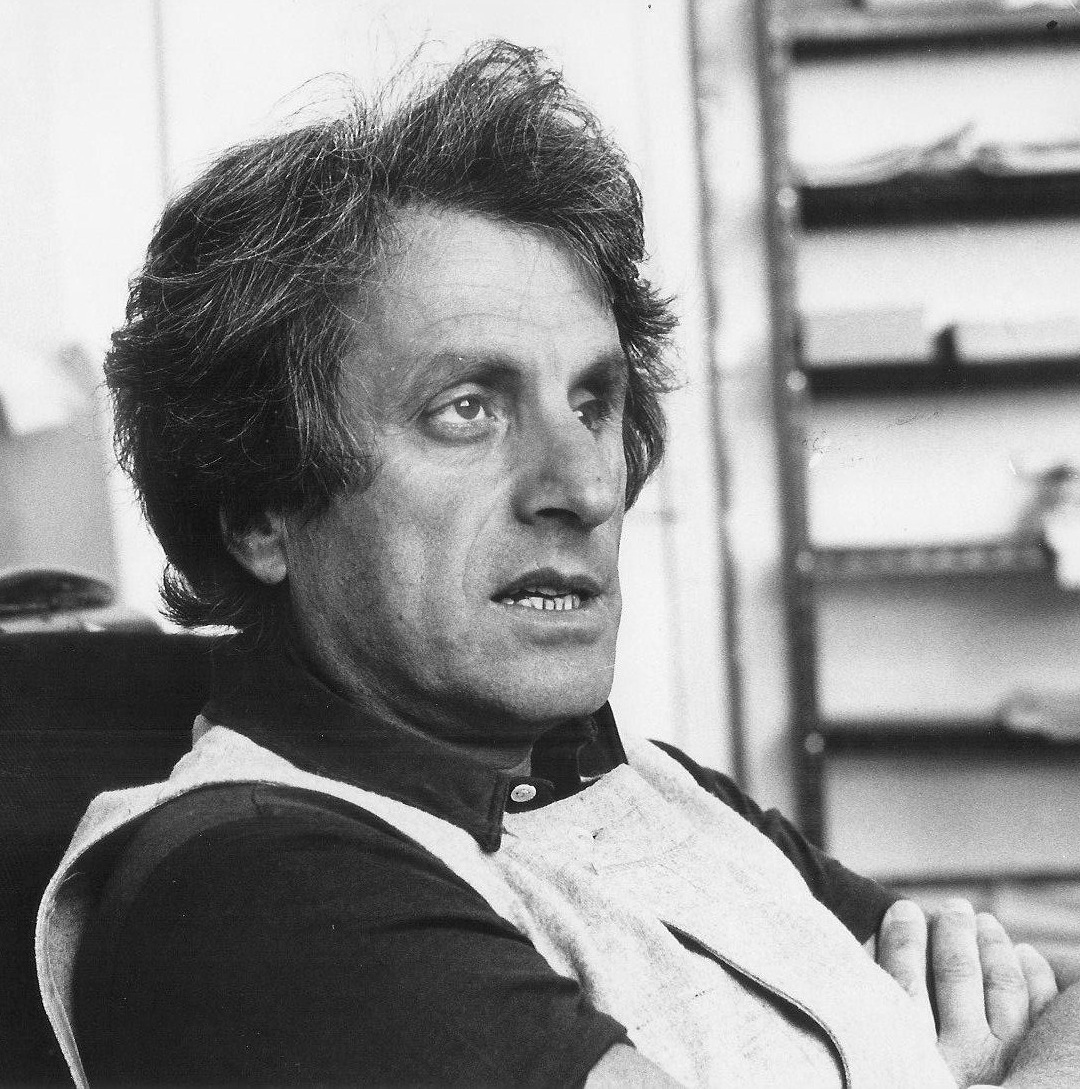
- Xenakis, around the time of this composition
- Composed: 1971
- Performed: 24 August 1971: Lucerne
- Scoring: 12 strings or string orchestra

Aroura is a composition for strings by Greek/French composer Iannis Xenakis. It was composed in 1971.

== Composition ==
The title of this composition should be translated as "Earth". It was first performed on 24 August 1971, at the Lucerne Festival. It was premiered by Rudolf Baumgartner with the festival's Lucerne Festival Strings. It was published shortly after by Éditions Salabert.

== Structure ==
The piece is in only one movement and takes around 12 minutes to perform. It is scored for four first violins, three second violins, two violas, two cellos and one double bass, even though it is clarified by Xenakis that it can also be performed by a larger string orchestra or ensemble. Aroura makes an extensive use of glissandos, jagged chords, sound clusters and other techniques exploited in avant-garde movements.

The piece has a tempo of 𝅗𝅥 = 60 (which means two beats per second). The register of the piece ranges from a C1 (played by the double bass) to D8, played by one of the first violins. First and second violins rarely play unison, but each of the violinist has their own line. Xenakis uses graphic notation up to six times in the score, the first one being the opening of the composition.

== Recordings ==
- On November 29, 1975, Elgar Howarth with the New Philharmonia Orchestra recorded the piece in Kingsway Hall, in London. The recording was released by Decca and Explore Records.
- In 2005, Johannes Kalitzke conducting the Ensemble Resonanz recorded the piece for Mode Records.
- In October 2010, Tammin Julian Lee conducting the Solistenensemble Kaleidoskop released a recording of the piece under Ars Produktion. The recording took place in the Jesus-Christus-Kirche, Dehlem in Berlin.
