= Phlegra (Xenakis) =

Composition by Iannis Xenakis

- by Iannis Xenakis
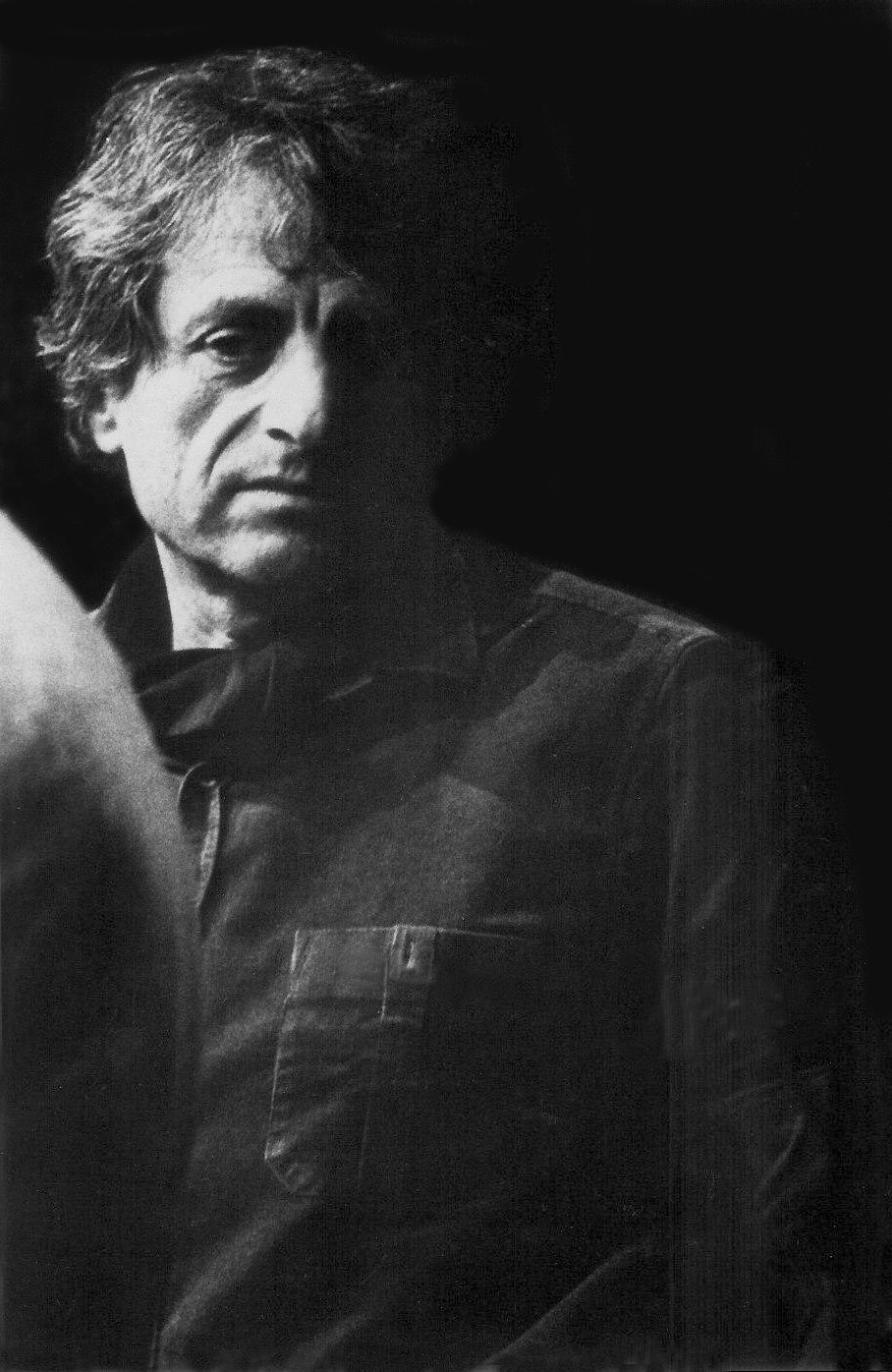
- Iannis Xenakis in 1975
- Composed: 1975
- Performed: January 1976
- Published: 1976
- Publisher: Editions Salabert
- Recorded: 1990
- Duration: 13 minutes
- Movements: 1
- Scoring: Ensemble of eleven instrumentalists

Premiere
- Date: January 1976
- Location: London
- Conductor: Michel Tabachnik
- Performers: London Sinfonietta

Phlegra (Greek: Φλέγρα) is a composition for ensemble by composer Iannis Xenakis. It was composed in 1975.

== Background ==
The composition was commissioned by the Gulbenkian Foundation for the London Sinfonietta, to whom it was also dedicated. It finished in 1975 and was premiered at the Queen Elizabeth Hall in January 1976 by the London Sinfonietta with long-time collaborator and conductor Michel Tabachnik. The title, Phlegra, is meant to refer to "the battlefield where the Gigantes and the new gods of Olympus clashed". It was subsequently published by Éditions Salabert in 1976.

== Structure ==
Phlegra is a one-movement, thirteen-minute composition scored for an ensemble of eleven instrumentalists: a flute (with a piccolo), an oboe, a B-flat clarinet (with a bass clarinet), a bassoon, a French horn in F, a trumpet, a trombone, a violin, a viola, a cello, and a double bass. The tempo is an unchanging ≅ 48 M. M. (~ 16'). At a regular 4/4, as in most of Xenakis's compositions, time signatures serve as references points for musicians, but they are not expected to play accents or mark downbeats. It has a total of 152 bars.

In terms of scoring and composition techniques used, Phlegra is generally associated with Empreintes: both compositions use the same type of instruments, but Phlegra only uses one of each instrument. As in Empreintes, he also uses avant-garde techniques, such as melodic arborescences in the woodwinds and brass, brownian movements in the strings, and rhythmic patterns played by repeating specific notes.

The composition is also notable for its use of consecutive glissandi: each note in the main melodies is meant to be played without any real separation, as they are merely points of reference in a continuous glissando, both up and down. The original score is written in C, while the double bass is written an octave higher and the piccolo is written an octave lower. Musicians are required to play with no vibrato. On stage, the musicians are expected to be seated in a straight line facing the public, with a conductor in front of them.

== Reception ==
Dominic Gill, music critic for The Financial Times, wrote that Phlegra is an "unusual, haunting piece" and that "the first impression of the music is less that of a battlefield than of a metropolis of songs and flowers - powerful, solid forms woven with lyrical colour, embroidered with all manner of formal texture".

== Recordings ==
Partly because of its difficulty and the unusual nature of its scoring, Phlegra has not been very commonly performed. The only recording available worldwide is the authoritative recording made by Michel Tabachnik with the Ensemble InterContemporain. Flutist Emmanuelle Ophèle, oboist László Hadady, clarinetists Alain Damiens and Guy Arnaud, bassoonist Pascal Gallois, hornist Jacques Deleplancque, trumpetist Antoine Curé, trombonists Jérôme Naulais and Benny Sluchin, violinist Jeanne-Marie Conquer, violist Jean Sulem, cellist Pierre Strauch, and double bassists Frédéric Stochl and Alex Bouchaud recorded the piece in July 1990. The recording was released by Erato on compact disc in 1992 and re-released by Erato in 2000 and Warner Classics in 2007.
