= Phlegra (mythology) =

Location in Greek and Roman mythology

Phlegra (Ancient Greek: Φλέγρα) is both a real and a mythical location in Greek and Roman mythology.

Phlegra is a peninsula of Macedonia (more specifically in Chalkidike) in modern Greece; it is an ancient name for Pallene in historical Thrace, the latter as per the toponymy of the ancients. Pallene and Phlegra is most commonly called nowadays Kassandra, or Peninsula of Kassandra. In Greek mythology, it is the site of Zeus's overthrowing of the Giants (Gigantes) at the end of the Gigantomachy.

The Greek geographer Strabo (c.63 BC – c. 24 AD) writes:

The peninsula Pallene, on whose isthmus is situated the city formerly called Potidaea and now Cassandreia, was called Phlegra in still earlier times. It used to be inhabited by the giants of whom the myths are told, an impious and lawless tribe, whom Heracles destroyed.

— Strabo, Geography. Book VII, fragment 27.

Nevertheless, various places have been associated with the Gigantomachy. The presence of volcanic phenomena, and the frequent unearthing of the fossilized bones of large prehistoric animals throughout these locations may explain why such sites became associated with the Giants. Pindar writes that the battle occurred at Phlegra ("the place of burning"), as do other early sources. Phlegra was an ancient name for Pallene, and Phlegra/Pallene was the usual birthplace of the Giants and site of the battle. Apollodorus, who placed the battle at Pallene, says the Giants were born "as some say, in Phlegrae, but according to others in Pallene". The name Phlegra and the Gigantomachy were also often associated, by later writers, with the Phlegraean Plain, the volcanic fields, at the east of Cumae. Diodorus Siculus presents a war featuring multiple battles, with one at Pallene, one on the Phlegraean Fields, and one on Crete. Even when, as in Apollodorus, the battle starts at one place, individual battles between Giant and god might range further afield, with Enceladus buried beneath Sicily, and Polybotes under the island of Nisyros (or Kos).

Strabo also refers to the Phlegraean Plain (Φλέγρας πεδίον, Phlegras pedion, or Φλεγραία πλάξ, Phlegraia plax, later Campi Flegrei), in Campania, "which mythology has made the setting of the story of the Giants":

This river [Liternus] flows through Venafrum and the centre of Campania. Next in order after these two cities comes Cumae [...] In earlier times, then, the city was prosperous, and so was what is called the Phlegraean Plain, which mythology has made the setting of the story of the Giants — for no other reason, it would seem, than that the land, on account of its excellence, was a thing to fight for.

— Strabo, Geography. Book V, chapter IV

According to the Greek geographer, the Giants who survived, were driven out by Heracles, finding refuge with their mother in Leuca (Apulia), in Italy's 'heel'. A fountain there had smelly water the locals claimed to be from the ichor of the giants. Strabo also mentions an account of Heracles battling Giants at Phanagoria, a Greek colony on the shores of the Black Sea.

== See also ==
- Greek mythology in popular culture
- Phlegra (disambiguation)
