= Oresteia (Xenakis) =

Greek opera by Iannis Xenakis

- Opera by Iannis Xenakis
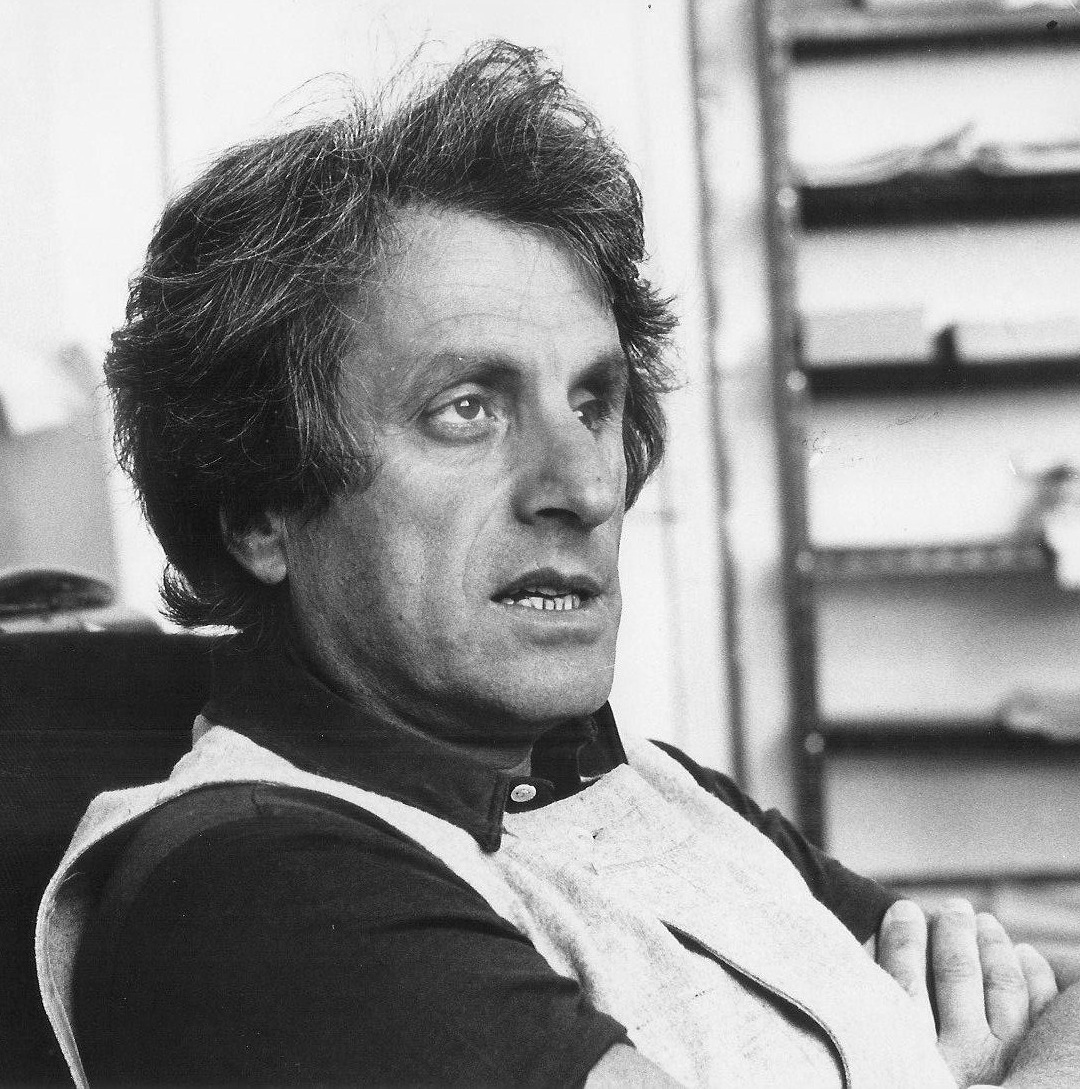
- Composer Iannis Xenakis
- Language: Greek
- Based on: The tragedy of Aeschylus
- Premiere: August 21, 1987; Sicily, Italy

Oresteia is a Greek opera by Iannis Xenakis originally composed in 1965 and 1966. The work is based on the Oresteia by Aeschylus. It is written for a chorus and twelve instrumentalists, and runs approximately 50 minutes. Xenakis composed two further movements of the work in the 1980s and 1992.

== Plot ==
Orestia begins at the end of the Trojan War with a song from the chorus about the sadness of human fate. Cassandra retells her rejection of Apollo, who punished her by allowing her to see the future but never to be believed by anyone. She goes on to describe the death of Agamemnon at the hands of his wife and her lover, Aegisthus. The chorus proceeds to sing a song mourning his death. Agamemnon's son, Orestes, vows revenge for his father's death. Orestes sets off to kill Aegisthus and his mother, and screams from off-stage indicate that he was successful. At Delphi, furies and the chorus realize Orestes' deed and decry him as a murderer who must be tried by the gods. As the trial of Orestes is held, Athena intervenes instead of allowing him to be convicted. She redefines the purpose of the court as a means of righting and preventing wrongs and persuades the furies to take a new role in human affairs. As the furies enter their new role, a hymn is sung to celebrate the new bond between humans and gods.

== Development ==
The bulk of the opera was finished in 1966, composed for a Greek Festival in Ypsilanti, Michigan. The festival would make the work's American premier on June 18, 1966, under the direction of Alexis Solomos.

To prepare the opera for a world stage, however, Xenakis knew the opera would have to be lengthened substantially. In the mid-1980s, Xenakis composed a cantata for an additional movement, titled Kassandra. The lengthened work would go on to make a world stage premier in Sicily, Italy on August 21, 1987, with conductors Michel Tabachnik and Dominique Debart.

In the 1992, Xenakis would give his final addition, La Déesse Athéna (the goddess Athena), for the Athens production of his work. This would be one of the composer's last vocal works and his last addition into the Oresteia trilogy. The composer never specified why he decided to expand the roles of Athena and Kassandra instead of focusing on characters that were more important to the story, such as Orestes.

== Music and instrumentation ==
The opera is scored for a children's chorus and twelve instrumentalists. The choral sections are often described as chant-like with crude sounding yet complex instrumental interludes. These are often compared to Stravinsky's The Rite of Spring and cited as being ruggedly dissonant.

== Notable performances ==
The work has been performed many times since its publishing. These include:

- Ypsilanti, Michigan, Directed by Alexis Solomos, June 18, 1966.
- Sicily, Italy, Conductors Michel Tabachnik and Dominique Debart, August 21, 1987.
- Opéra de Rennes, Conductor Sylvain Blassel, March 30, 2016.
- Antonín Dvořák Theatre, Conductor Petr Kotík, June 30, 2016.
- Theater Basel, Conductor Franck Ollu, March 24, 2017.
- Auditorio de Zaragoza, Conductor Asier Puga, May 9, 2022.
- Teatro Romano de Mérida, Conductor Asier Puga, July 1, 2023.
