= Neos (record label) =

German music record label

Neos is a German jazz and classical contemporary music record label established by Wulf Weinmann, formerly owner and label manager of Col Legno. Neos is notable for the premiere recordings of several modern composers, starting with a series with the Adam Mickiewicz Institute, of five albums of mainly previously unreleased works by the Russian-Polish composer Mieczysław Weinberg, recorded at the Bregenzer Festspiele 2010.
