= Guy Deplus =

French clarinetist (1924–2020)

Guy Gaston Simon Deplus (29 August 1924 – 14 January 2020) was a French clarinetist.

== Biography ==
Deplus was born in Vieux-Condé and studied clarinet at the Conservatoire de Paris, where he would later become a professor of clarinet, and received Premiers Prix in clarinet and chamber music. He taught many French orchestral clarinetists. He was also one of the clarinetists who collaborated with Buffet Crampon on the creation of the Tosca, Festival and RC Prestige clarinets. Together with Pierre Boulez, Deplus co-founded the "Concerts du Domaine Musical". He was a soloist in the Paris Opera. Deplus received the Lifetime Achievement Award from the International Clarinet Association (for "Outstanding Performance, Teaching, Research, and Service to the Clarinet).

He died aged 95 in Nogent-sur-Marne.

== Discography ==
- Olivier Messiaen - Never Before Released, with Christian Lardé and the BBC Philharmonic Orchestra. Jade, 2008.
- (Le) Domain Musical 1956 - 1967, with various artists. Accord, 2006.
- Autour de Mozart, with Olivier Voize and Quatuor Sollare. Quantum, 1996.
- Homage To Stravinsky, Soloists & Domaine Musical Ensemble, Conductor Pierre Boulez. 3 Pieces For Clarinet, Everest 3184.
