= Mode Records =

American classical and avant-garde record label

- Genre: Contemporary classical, jazz, avant-garde
- Country of origin: U.S.
- Location: New York City
- Official website: moderecords.com

Mode Records is an American record label in New York City that concentrates on contemporary classical music and other forms of avant-garde music. The label was founded by Brian Brandt in 1984, with a goal of releasing music composed by John Cage.

Composers featured include John Cage, Morton Feldman, Iannis Xenakis, Giacinto Scelsi, and Harry Partch. Performers include Steve Lacy, Aki Takahashi, Martine Joste, the Arditti Quartet, and Gerry Hemingway. The label also has a commitment to younger composers with releases featuring Jason Eckardt, Joshua Fineberg, and Lei Liang.

An earlier unrelated Mode Records existed for a short time in the 1950s and was involved West Coast jazz. It is now controlled by VSOP.

== See also ==
- List of record labels
