= Aki Takahashi =

Japanese pianist (born 1944)

- Born: September 6, 1944; Kamakura, Kanagawa
- Other name: 高橋 アキ
- Occupation: pianist
- Spouse: Kuniharu Akiyama
- Relatives: Yūji Takahashi (brother)

Aki Takahashi (高橋 アキ, Takahashi Aki; born September 6, 1944) is a Japanese pianist specializing in contemporary classical music.

== Biography ==
Born in Kamakura, she began studying piano at the age of five and received her M.A. degree from the Tokyo National University of Fine Arts and Music. Her teachers included Yutaka Ito, Ray Lev, and George Vásárhelyi. She presented her first public recital in 1970 and her European debut in 1972.

She has released numerous recordings and many 20th-century composers, including John Cage, Morton Feldman, Peter Garland, Alvin Lucier, Isang Yun, Joji Yuasa, Toshi Ichiyanagi, Carl Stone, Maki Ishii, and Takehisa Kosugi, have written pieces for her. She has also performed works by Olivier Messiaen, Pierre Boulez, Iannis Xenakis, Tōru Takemitsu, and her brother, Yuji Takahashi. On the occasion of the premiere of Triadic Memories, Morton Feldman, described her as follows: "Aki Takahashi is very different [from David Tudor or Roger Woodward]. Takahashi appears to be absolutely still. undisturbed, unperturbed, as if in a concentrated prayer... The effect of her playing on me is that I feel privileged to be invited to a very religious ritual."

Takahashi has toured extensively throughout the United States, Europe, and Asia, and served as Artist-in-Residence at the State University of New York at Buffalo from 1980–81. She was a guest professor at the California Institute of the Arts in 1984 and 1985.
