= Pithoprakta =

Piece by Iannis Xenakis for string orchestra

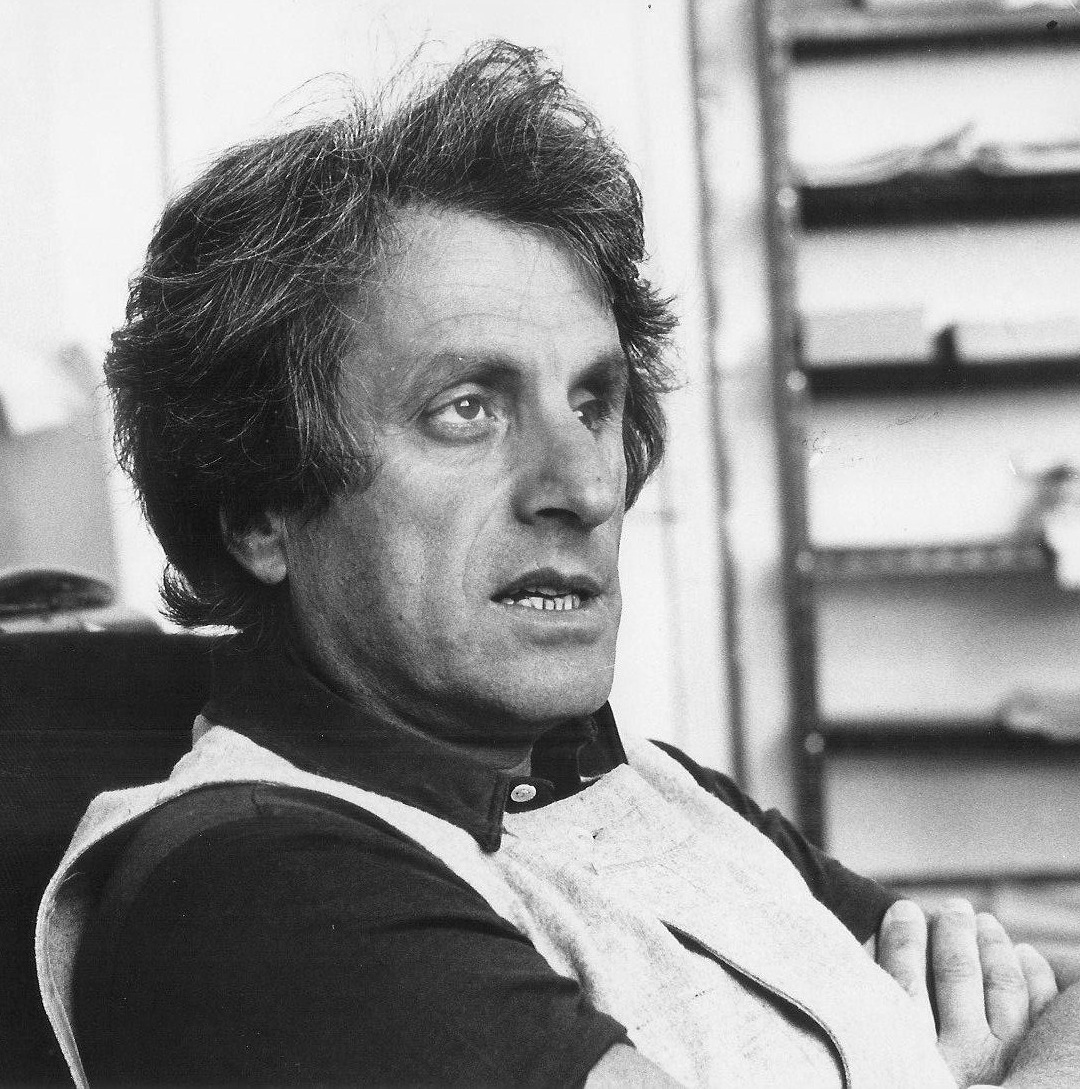
Iannis Xenakis in his Paris studio, c. 1970

Pithoprakta (1955–56) is a piece by Iannis Xenakis for string orchestra (with 46 separate solo parts), two trombones, xylophone, and wood block, premièred by conductor Hermann Scherchen in Munich in March 1957. A typical performance of the piece lasts about 10 minutes.

The word Pithoprakta translates to "actions through probability". This relates to Jacob Bernoulli's law of large numbers which states that as the number of occurrences of a chance event increases, the average outcome approaches a determinate end. The piece is based on the statistical mechanics of gases, Gauss's law, or Brownian motion. Each instrument is conceived as a molecule obeying the Maxwell–Boltzmann distribution law, with Gaussian distribution of temperature fluctuation. This theory states that "the temperature of a gas derives from the independent movement of its molecules." Xenakis drew an analogy between the movement of a gas molecule through space and that of a string instrument through its pitch range.

To construct the seething movement of the piece, he governed the 'molecules' according to a coherent sequence of imaginary temperatures and pressures. Brownian motion is a four-dimensional phenomenon (three spatial dimensions and time), and Xenakis created the score by first creating a two-dimensional graph, necessitating some simplifications. The abscissa (x) represents time at 5 cm = 26 MM, while the ordinates (y) represent pitch at 1 semitone = .25 cm, when transcribed into musical notation 5 cm = 1 measure. This length is subdivided into three, four, and five equal parts, allowing for fine differences in duration but also creating a steady pulse in each instrumental part, reducing the rhythm of the random walk to steady footsteps. Composer Simon Emmerson notes that this regularity is "impossible in reality and fails to use his ‘stochastic’ approach in this instance." Each part gets nowhere, but as a whole the mass's pitch is freely modulated and its speed-determined "temperature" varies.

This piece was made into a ballet by George Balanchine, Metastaseis and Pithoprakta, along with the earlier Metastaseis.
