= Francis Salabert =

French music publisher

Francis Salabert (born François-Joseph-Charles Salabert, 27 July 1884 – 28 December 1946) (Note: Some sources give the date of his death as 22 December, but accident records give the date as 28 December.) was an innovative and influential French music publisher, who was the head of Éditions Salabert in the first half of the twentieth century.

== Biography ==
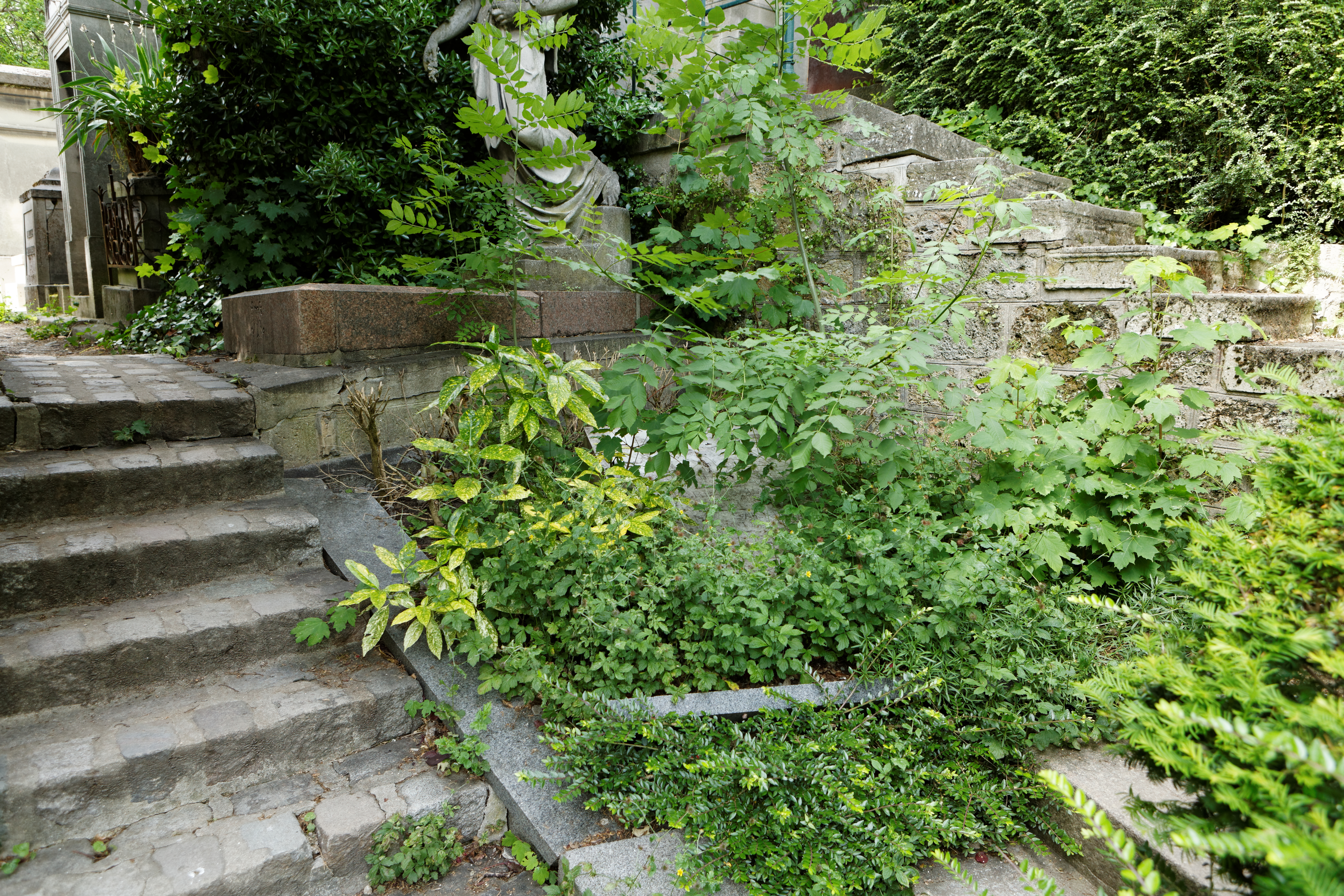
Tomb of Francis Salabert at the Père-Lachaise Cemetery.

He was born François-Joseph-Charles Salabert in Paris. His father, Edouard Salabert (1838-1903), started the publishing business Éditions Salabert in the rue de la Victoire in 1878, initially to publish martial music, and acquired the rights to the marches of John Philip Sousa. However, Edouard became incapacitated through illness, and in 1901 Francis took over running the company at the age of 16.

In 1908 he moved the business to rue Chauchat, and began expanding it to include the repertoires of composers and writers of light music, including Henri Christiné, Reynaldo Hahn, Aristide Bruant, Maurice Yvain, Vincent Scotto, Georges Van Parys, and, later, Charles Trenet. For Christiné's successful operetta Phi-Phi in 1919, Salabert devised a system for displaying the song's words above the theatre stage, so that the audience could sing along. He also started the practice of signing songwriters to exclusive contracts. He ensured that he retained the copyrights of French songs performed abroad, and routinely added his name as "arranger" to recordings of the songs. Salabert published the music of Erik Satie. He also acquired the rights to film music, and the music performed by singers such as Trenet, Mistinguett, Josephine Baker, Edith Piaf, and Yves Montand. For a time after World War I, he was also responsible for directing the Moulin Rouge nightclub.

During Salabert's lifetime, Éditions Salabert also acquired the rights to publish such important works as Arthur Honegger's Jeanne d'Arc au bûcher (first privately printed, then published by them in reduction in 1939) and the same composer's first and second symphonies (published by them in 1930 and 1942), for example.

Salabert died in December 1946, aged 62, in a plane crash on the approach to Shannon Airport, Ireland. His widow Mica continued to run the business.
