= Aleatoric music =

Music in which some element of the composition is left to chance

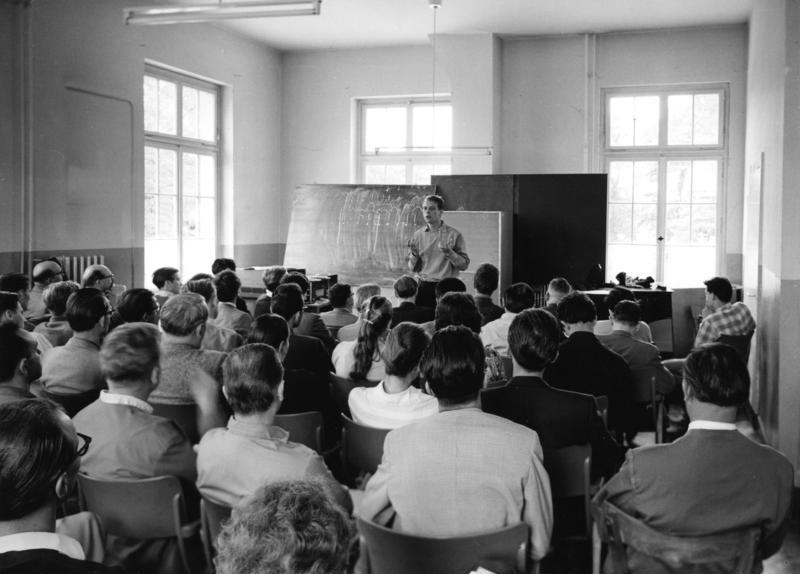
Karlheinz Stockhausen lecturing on Klavierstück XI at Darmstadt, July 1957

Aleatoric music (also aleatory music or chance music; from the Latin word alea, meaning "dice") is music in which some element of the composition is left to chance, or some primary element of a composed work's realization is left to the determination of its performer(s), or both. The term is most often associated with procedures in which the chance element involves a relatively limited number of possibilities.

The term became known to European composers through lectures by acoustician Werner Meyer-Eppler at the Darmstadt International Summer Courses for New Music in the beginning of the 1950s. According to his definition, "a process is said to be aleatoric ... if its course is determined in general but depends on chance in detail". Through a confusion of Meyer-Eppler's German terms Aleatorik (noun) and aleatorisch (adjective), his translator created a new English word, "aleatoric" (rather than using the existing English adjective "aleatory"), which quickly became fashionable and has persisted. More recently, the variant "aleatoriality" has been introduced.

== History ==
=== Early precedents ===
Compositions that could be considered a precedent for aleatory composition date back to at least the late 15th century, with the genre of the catholicon, exemplified by the Missa cuiusvis toni of Johannes Ockeghem. A later genre was the Musikalisches Würfelspiel or musical dice game, popular in the late 18th and early 19th century. (Such dice games are attributed to Carl Philipp Emanuel Bach, Joseph Haydn, and Wolfgang Amadeus Mozart.) These games consisted of a sequence of musical measures, for which each measure had several possible versions and a procedure for selecting the precise sequence based on the throwing of a number of dice.

The French artist Marcel Duchamp composed two pieces between 1913 and 1915 based on chance operations. One of these, Erratum Musical, written with Duchamp's sisters Yvonne and Magdeleine for three voices, was first performed at the Manifestation of Dada on 27 March 1920, and was eventually published in 1934. Two of his contemporaries, Francis Picabia and Georges Ribemont-Dessaignes, also experimented with chance composition, these works being performed at a Festival Dada staged at the Salle Gaveau concert hall, Paris, on 26 May 1920. American composer John Cage's Music of Changes (1951) was "the first composition to be largely determined by random procedures", though his indeterminacy is of a different order from Meyer-Eppler's concept. Cage later asked Duchamp: "How is it that you used chance operations when I was just being born?"

=== Modern usage ===
The earliest significant use of aleatory features is found in many of the compositions of American Charles Ives in the early 20th century. Henry Cowell adopted Ives's ideas during the 1930s, in such works as the Mosaic Quartet (String Quartet No. 3, 1934), which allows the players to arrange the fragments of music in a number of different possible sequences. Cowell also used specially devised notations to introduce variability into the performance of a work, sometimes instructing the performers to improvise a short passage or play ad libitum. Later American composers, such as Alan Hovhaness (beginning with his Lousadzak of 1944) used procedures superficially similar to Cowell's, in which different short patterns with specified pitches and rhythm are assigned to several parts, with instructions that they be performed repeatedly at their own speed without coordination with the rest of the ensemble. Some scholars regard the resultant blur as "hardly aleatory, since exact pitches are carefully controlled and any two performances will be substantially the same" although, according to another writer, this technique is essentially the same as that later used by Witold Lutosławski. Depending on the vehemence of the technique, Hovhaness's published scores annotate these sections variously, for example as "Free tempo / humming effect" and "Repeat and repeat ad lib, but not together".

In Europe, following the introduction of the expression "aleatory music" by Meyer-Eppler, the French composer Pierre Boulez was largely responsible for popularizing the term.

Other early European examples of aleatory music include Klavierstück XI (1956) by Karlheinz Stockhausen, which features 19 elements to be performed in a sequence to be determined in each case by the performer. A form of limited aleatory was used by Witold Lutosławski (beginning with Jeux Vénitiens in 1960–61), where extensive passages of pitches and rhythms are fully specified, but the rhythmic coordination of parts within the ensemble is subject to an element of chance.

There has been much confusion of the terms aleatory and indeterminate/chance music. One of Cage's pieces, HPSCHD, itself composed using chance procedures, uses music from Mozart's Musikalisches Würfelspiel, referred to above, as well as original music.

== Types of indeterminate music ==
Some writers do not make a distinction between aleatory, chance, and indeterminacy in music, and use the terms interchangeably. From this point of view, indeterminate or chance music can be divided into three groups: (1) the use of random procedures to produce a determinate, fixed score, (2) mobile form, and (3) indeterminate notation, including graphic notation and texts.

The first group includes scores in which the chance element is involved only in the process of composition, so that every parameter is fixed before their performance. In John Cage's Music of Changes (1951), for example, the composer selected duration, tempo, and dynamics by using the I Ching, an ancient Chinese book which prescribes methods for arriving at random numbers. Because this work is absolutely fixed from performance to performance, Cage regarded it as an entirely determinate work made using chance procedures. On the level of detail, Iannis Xenakis used probability theories to define some microscopic aspects of Pithoprakta (1955–56), which is Greek for "actions by means of probability". This work contains four sections, characterized by textural and timbral attributes, such as glissandi and pizzicati. At the macroscopic level, the sections are designed and controlled by the composer while the single components of sound are controlled by mathematical theories.

In the second type of indeterminate music, chance elements involve the performance. Notated events are provided by the composer, but their arrangement is left to the determination of the performer. Karlheinz Stockhausen's Klavierstück XI (1956) presents nineteen events which are composed and notated in a traditional way, but the arrangement of these events is determined by the performer spontaneously during the performance. In Earle Brown's Available forms II (1962), the conductor is asked to decide the order of the events at the very moment of the performance.

The greatest degree of indeterminacy is reached by the third type of indeterminate music, where traditional musical notation is replaced by visual or verbal signs suggesting how a work can be performed, for example in graphic score pieces. Earle Brown's December 1952 (1952) shows lines and rectangles of various lengths and thicknesses that can read as loudness, duration, or pitch. The performer chooses how to read them. Another example is Morton Feldman's Intersection No. 2 (1951) for piano solo, written on coordinate paper. Time units are represented by the squares viewed horizontally, while relative pitch levels of high, middle, and low are indicated by three vertical squares in each row. The performer determines what particular pitches and rhythms to play.

== Open form music ==
Open form is a term sometimes used for 'mobile' or 'polyvalent' musical forms, where the order of movements or sections is indeterminate or left up to the performer. Roman Haubenstock-Ramati composed a series of influential "mobiles" such as Interpolation (1958).

However, "open form" in music is also used in the sense defined by the art historian Heinrich Wölfflin to mean a work which is fundamentally incomplete, represents an unfinished activity, or points outside of itself. In this sense, a "mobile form" can be either "open" or "closed". An example of a "dynamic, closed" mobile musical composition is Stockhausen's Zyklus (1959).

== Stochastic music ==
Stochastic processes may be used in music to compose a fixed piece or may be produced in performance. Stochastic music was pioneered by Xenakis, who coined the term stochastic music. Specific examples of mathematics, statistics, and physics applied to music composition are the use of the statistical mechanics of gases in Pithoprakta, statistical distribution of points on a plane in Diamorphoses, minimal constraints in Achorripsis, the normal distribution in ST/10 and Atrées, Markov chains in Analogiques, game theory in Duel and Stratégie, group theory in Nomos Alpha (for Siegfried Palm), set theory in Herma and Eonta, and Brownian motion in N'Shima.

Xenakis frequently used computers to produce his scores, such as the ST series including Morsima-Amorsima and Atrées, and founded CEMAMu.

== Film music ==
Examples of extensive aleatoric writing can be found in small passages from John Williams' score for the film Images. Other film composers using this technique are Mark Snow (X-Files: Fight the Future), John Corigliano, and others. Snow used digital samples of acoustic instruments "to merge starkly electronic timbres with acoustically based sounds, an approach developed extensively in his much celebrated music for The X-Files (1993–2002, 2016–18). Over the course of the series, Snow's often ambient music dissolved distinctions between sound design and musical score."

Howard Shore employed aleatoric composition in The Lord of the Rings: The Fellowship of the Ring during the Fellowship's encounter with the Watcher in the Water outside of the gates of Moria.

== See also ==
- Aleatoricism
- Algorithmic composition
- Generative music
