= Evryali =

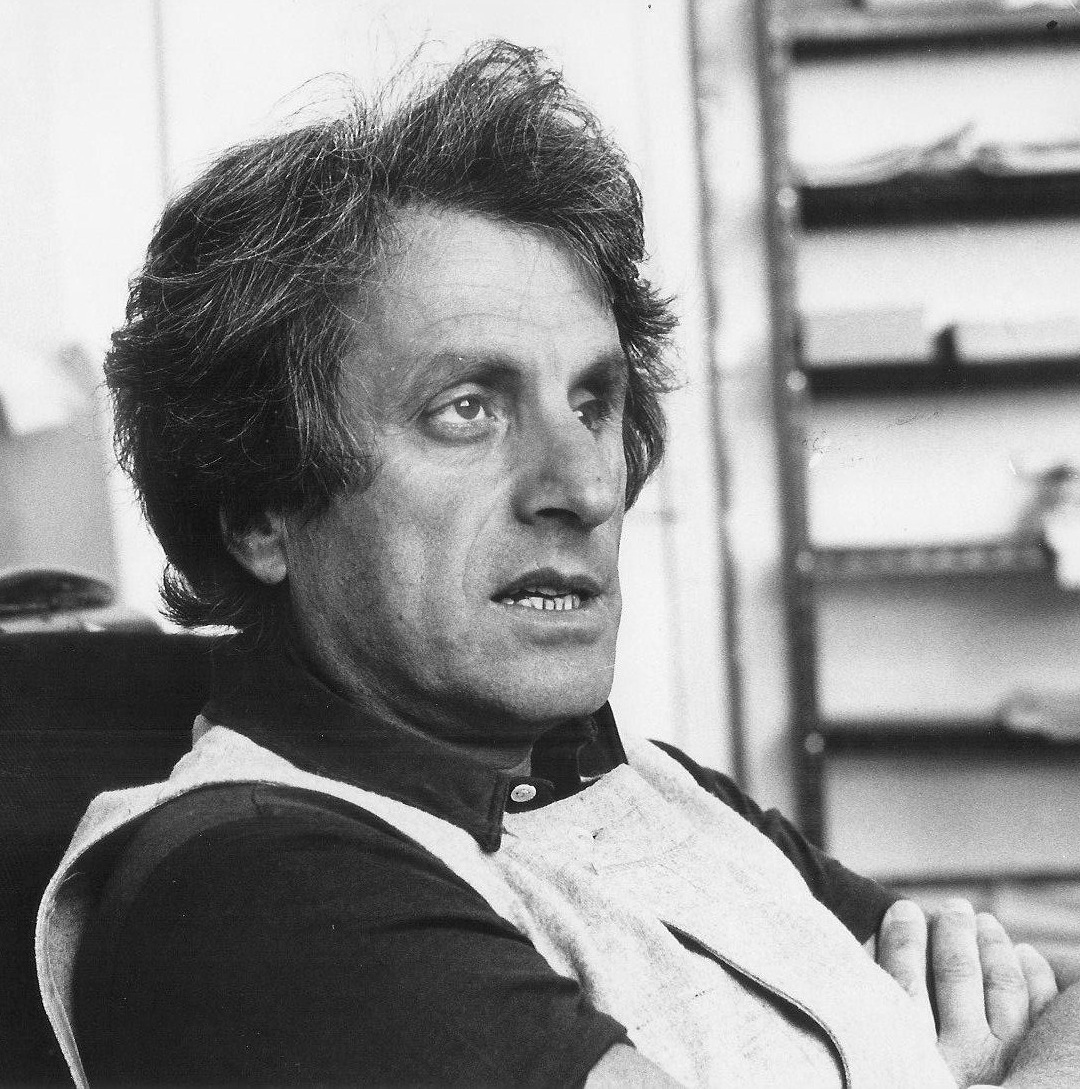
Iannis Xenakis in his Paris studio, c. 1970

Evryali (from Ancient Greek: Εὐρυάλη Euryale) is a piece for solo piano composed by Iannis Xenakis in 1973. It is based on a technique Xenakis invented in early 1970s, called arborescences—proliferations of melodic lines created from a generative contour. The title refers to the name of one of the Gorgon sisters, and is also Greek for open sea.

Written in 1973, Evryali was Xenakis' second major work for piano solo after Herma, written in 1961. Evryali was composed for, and dedicated to, pianist Marie-Françoise Bucquet. According to her, upon presenting her the score, Xenakis said: "Here's the piece. Look at it, and if you think you can do something with it, play it". Conventional notation is used throughout the score; however, instead of using two or three staves as is customary for piano scores, Xenakis frequently employs four and five staves. Numerous passages are impossible to play as written either because it is physically impossible to reach the notes, or, in one case (a C-sharp in the penultimate passage of arborescences), because the written note is not available on most pianos (this particular difficulty was rectified in a later edition of the work). Therefore, the performer has to create a reduction of the piece, omitting some notes, transposing others, etc., in order to make it playable. Citing these and other difficulties of Evryali, pianist-composer Marc Couroux compares the performer to the "warrior" from Carlos Castaneda's books: when confronted with the piece, one must remain "lucid" and choose "which aspects [of the piece] are essential and must be preserved", and which must be sacrificed.

The music consists almost entirely of a limited number of distinct kinds of texture. On the most basic level, one can distinguish five of these: fixed rhythmic passages, stochastic clouds, polyphonic arborescences, monophonic waves and silence. Chung offers different names for the textures, but with essentially the same content). A more complex analysis, offered by musicologist Ronald Squibbs, reveals that Evryali has four distinct "configuration types". The first is derived from applying set theory to time-point sequences, each of which is then assigned to a specific pitch. This is the configuration type the work starts with. The second type is generated by stochastic methods, arborescences constitute the third, and finally, the fourth configuration type is silence. According to this classification, there are fifty segments overall in Evryali: 23 for time-point sequences, 4 for stochastic material (appearing only at two points in the work, both times as consecutive pairs), 20 for arborescences, and 3 are silences. In the score, the silences are notated in seconds.

In adopting a single tempo throughout, Evryali is unique in Xenakis' oeuvre for solo piano.

Evryali is connected to earlier works, particularly Synaphaï (1969), certain parts of which led to the creation of the arborescence technique. Several passages from Evryali were later reused, with some modification, in the chamber work Dikhthas (1979).
