= Xenakis =

Xenakis is a Greek surname. Notable people with the surname include:

- Constantin Xenakis (1931–2020), Greek artist
- Françoise Xenakis (1930–2018), French novelist
- Iannis Xenakis (1922–2001), Greek composer and architect
- Jason Xenakis (1923–1977), Romanian-born Greek philosopher
- Thomas Xenakis (1875–1942), Greek gymnast

== See also ==
- Xenakis Ensemble, a Dutch ensemble dedicated to the performance of contemporary classical music
- Eleni Xenaki (born 1997), Greek water polo player
