= Synaphaï =

- by Iannis Xenakis
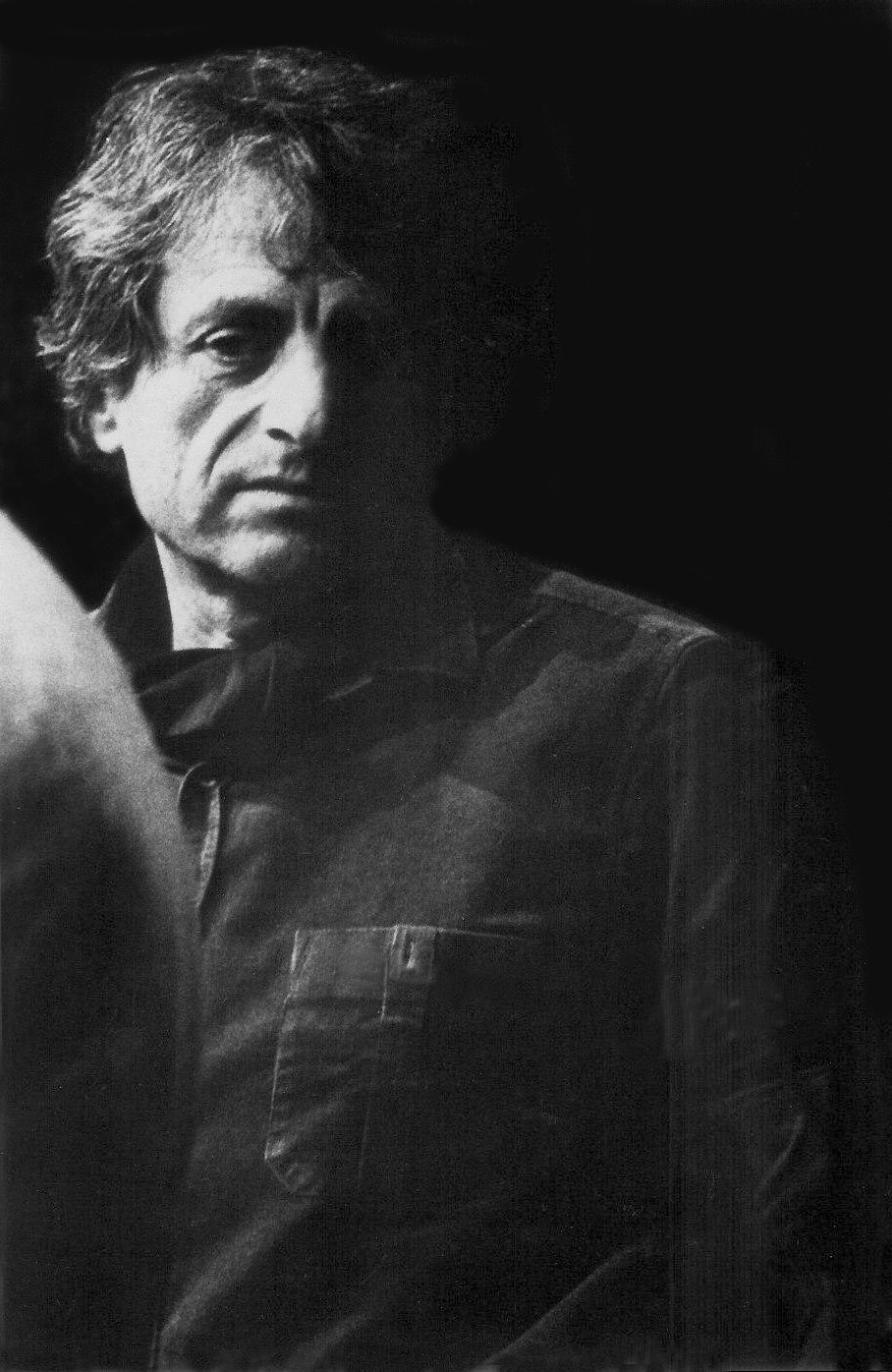
- Iannis Xenakis in 1975
- Composed: 1969:
- Performed: 1971: Bordeaux
- Published: May 1981: Paris
- Scoring: Piano and orchestra

Synaphaï (Greek: connexities) is a composition for piano and orchestra by Greek composer Iannis Xenakis. It was finished in 1969 and premiered in 1971.

== Composition ==
Synaphaï was initially commissioned by Hofstra University on New York's Long Island for the conductor Eleazar de Carvalho and the pianist Jocy de Oliveira. It was finished in 1969 and premiered at the 1971 Royan Festival, of which he was a regular composer, during the festival's Xenakis Day, in which ten of Xenakis's most important works were performed. The piece was performed by Georges Pludermacher at the piano and the Orchestre Philharmonique de l'ORTF with Michel Tabachnik. The piece was later published by Éditions Salabert in May 1981.

== Structure ==
Synaphaï consists of only one movement and takes approximately 12–16 minutes to perform. It has largely been categorized as a piano concerto, because of the solo piano's prominent part and its cadenza. It is scored for a solo piano and a large orchestra of 86 musicians, consisting of:

- 3 flutes
- 3 oboes
- 3 clarinets
- 3 bassoons
- 4 French horns
- 4 trumpets
- 4 trombones
- 1 tuba

As well as a large percussion section and a large string section. The orchestra is set vertically on stage towards the audience. The instruments are put into four groups: alpha, beta, gamma, and delta. That way, the instruments are separated into almost even groups, as expressed in the score.

The compositional style rejects the idea of a dialogue between the solo piano and the orchestra, but rather promotes a conjunction between these two elements, hence the title of the piece. Unlike a traditional concerto, in Synaphaï the piano is integrated into the texture of the work, and is given equal footing with the other instruments. However, it also plays a prominent role given its near-continuous presence and the virtuosic nature of the piano writing.

The piano part is of extreme difficulty and is written on ten staves, one for each of the pianist's fingers. (In the foreword to the score, Xenakis wrote: "The pianist plays all the lines, if he can.") Much of the piano writing produces what Xenakis would later call "arborescences", where germinal shapes proliferate into a variety of branching lines. The overall effect is often that of a liquid yet strongly linear sonority with a kind of inner richness and life.

Xenakis considers the compositional style used in the piece as a continuation of his own Eonta (1963–64), which eventually culminated in Evryali (1973) and Erikhthon (1974).

== Reception ==
The piece was highly successful in the première and immediately encored. Jacques Lonchampt, from Le Monde, wrote that Synaphaï has "a torrential score, tossing in a kind of perpetual tremolo on top of which break through frenzied rhythmic sequences, but also a whole agitation, shuddering and truly musical". Musicologist Henry-Louis de La Grange said of the piece: "Set against a flamboyant orchestral tapestry, occasionally pierced by harsh cries from the brass, the highly elaborate piano part (the score uses one stave for each finger!) stands out in high relief, with a tremendous, rhythmic drive".

Pianist Roger Woodward reflected on the visceral reaction he experienced while performing the piece, recalling an "overwhelming crescendo... where, throughout the opening eighty-two measures... I had to play handfuls of chords as a fff trill with pedal. I remembered the struggle to hear what I was in fact playing, as the full orchestra was so loud. It had almost reached a point of aural disorientation, and at the very point a choir of thirteen brass almost obliterated the focus of the full orchestral sound altogether with their entry. I remembered the very floorboards shaking on stage. Riding the solo part felt like riding a surfboard on a tidal wave, in the expectation of hopefully reaching dry land safely."

In an interview with Xenakis, Bálint András Varga stated the following: "While listening to Synaphaï I noticed something very interesting...: suddenly there appears a melody. It disappears just as quickly, but because it's so different from the context in which it's heard it attracts attention immediately. Do these melodic patterns have a special significance or do they occur 'accidentally'?" Xenakis responded: "In the cases you have listed, accidentally. In following a train of thought the corresponding music might produce something which is reminiscent of a melody. Am I to break the continuity of thought only to avoid that? Sometimes I do change it but at other times I don't care."

== Recordings ==
- Geoffrey Douglas Madge recorded it in November 1975, with Elgar Howarth conducting the Philharmonia Orchestra. The recording was later released by Decca Records.
