= Bohor (Xenakis) =

- by Iannis Xenakis
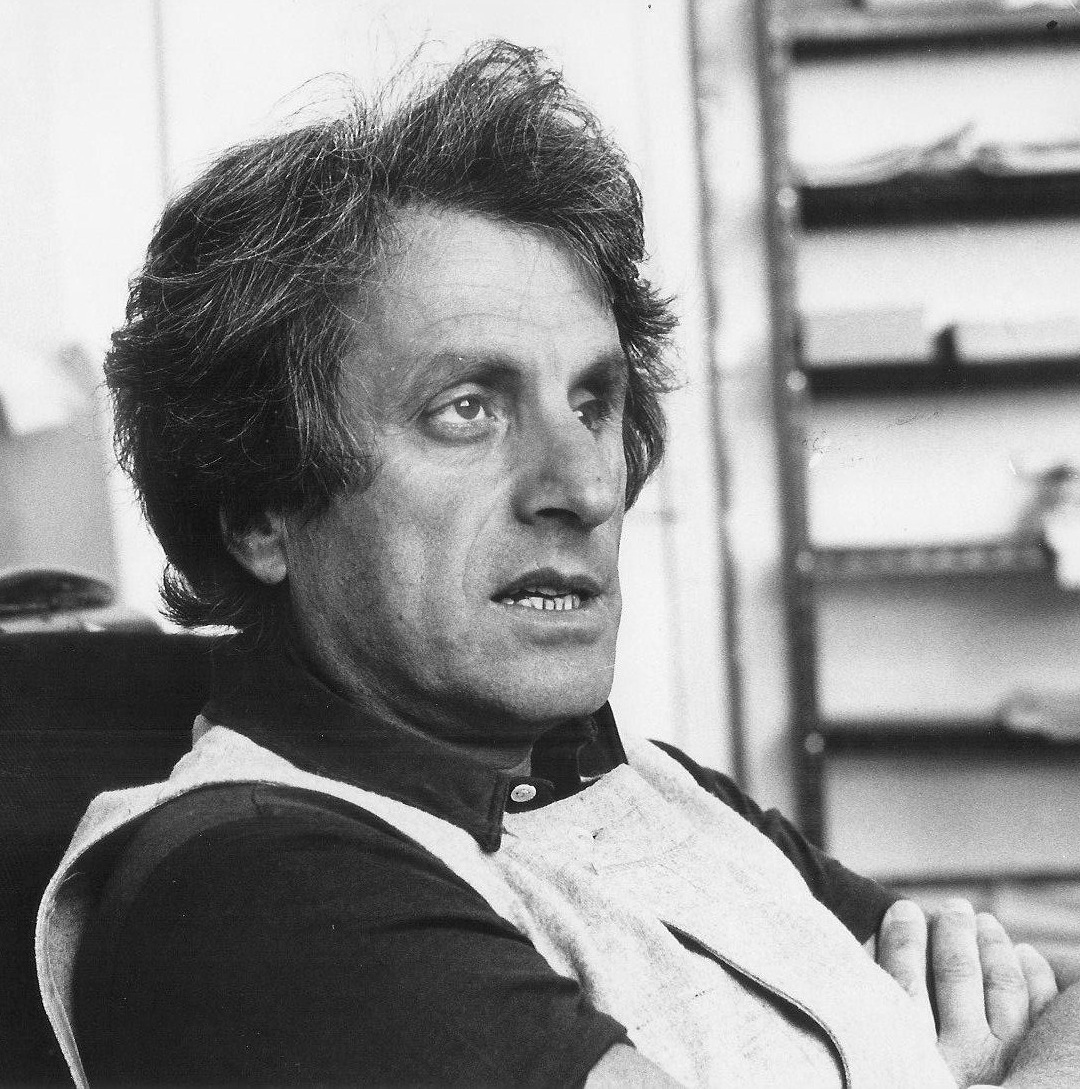
- Iannis Xenakis in his Paris studio, c. 1970
- Composed: 1962
- Performed: December 15, 1962
- Duration: 21:30
- Movements: 1
- Scoring: Electroacoustic music

Bohor (also known as Bohor I) is an electroacoustic composition by Iannis Xenakis dating from 1962.

== Background ==
In 1954, Xenakis joined Pierre Schaeffer's Groupe de Recherches Musicales, and began working in their studio the following year. During his residence, he completed a number of electroacoustic compositions, including Diamorphoses (1957), Concret PH (1958), and Orient-Occident (1960). By 1962, during which he composed Bohor, Xenakis's musical interests began to diverge from those of Schaeffer, in that, while Schaeffer's interests revolved around the study of "sound objects", Xenakis wanted to focus on architectural and mathematical approaches to music. Despite this, Xenakis chose to dedicate Bohor to Schaeffer, although he left the GRM later that year.

== Composition ==
Bohor was composed during a period in which Xenakis was interested in exploring the gradual transformation of extremely rich sounds. He stated: "You start with a sound made up of many particles, then see how you can make it change imperceptibly, growing, changing, and developing, until an entirely new sound results." He compared the process to the slow onset of insanity, "when a person suddenly realizes that an environment that had seemed familiar to him has now become altered in a profound, threatening sense."

In contrast with other works of that period, such as Herma for piano, Xenakis "did not do calculations" when composing Bohor, and instead relied on "a new intuition that formed in the heat of action." He utilized four sound sources: a Laotian mouth organ (slowed down), metal Byzantine jewelry (amplified), crotales, and hammerings on the inside of a piano. The music was recorded at the GRM studio on eight channels, which were mixed down to two for commercial releases. The title refers to one of the Knights of the Round Table.

== Material and form ==
Xenakis described Bohor as "monistic with internal plurality, converging and contracting finally into the piercing angle of the end." Nearly 22 minutes in duration, it is essentially a single, slowly changing, complex mass of sound; musicologist Makis Solomos compared it to "the experience of listening to the clanging of a large bell—from inside the bell." There are two basic kinds of texture: low, slow-moving, sustained drones which fade in and out, and fast-moving metallic clanking and crashing sounds. These evolve simultaneously and independently, with multiple layers of each texture type appearing in varying degrees of density. During the final minutes, the sound narrows down into a band of noise that increases in intensity and amplitude until it is cut off abruptly.

Author and composer Jonathan Kramer suggested that the form of Bohor exemplifies what he called "vertical time," in that it "lacks internal phrase differentiation," using sound material that is "largely unchanged throughout its duration." The overall effect is that of "a single present stretched out into an enormous duration, a potentially infinite 'now' that nonetheless feels like an instant." Writer Agostino Di Scipio noted that, at the time it was composed, Bohor was "one of the most radical attempts at annulling linear articulation in Western music," as it is "void of recognizable logical progression."

== Premiere and reception ==
Bohor was premiered at the Festival de Gravesano in Paris on December 15, 1962, and resulted in a scandal partly due to the high volume of the sound system. According to Xenakis, Bohor's dedicatee, Pierre Schaeffer, hated the piece, and Schaeffer himself wrote: "this was an enormous burst of explosions..., an offensive accumulation of lancet jabs to the ear at maximum volume level." Subsequent performances tended to provoke strong, visceral reactions. At a concert held in Paris during October 1968, some audience members screamed during the performance, while others stood and cheered. During a 1971 performance at the Whitney Museum in New York City, "One woman in the reserved-seat section screamed throughout the final few minutes, and—incredibly—made herself heard." A performance at the Fillmore East ("at Jefferson Airplane volume") was the loudest piece to be heard at the venue, and was received with "ecstatic shouts."

Critical reception was mixed. In a review for High Fidelity, Alfred Frankenstein stated that Bohor "has in general more variety, color, formal ingenuity, and genius behind it than practically all the other electronic works on record put together," and remarked: "Put this work alongside Pelléas, the Sacre, Pierrot Lunaire; it's one of the scores whereby the music of our century will be measured." Writing for The New York Times, Donal Henahan described the work as "a 22 minute bore... suggesting what one hears when he finds himself seated too near the dishwashing room at a banquet." In a separate review, Henahan called Bohor "one long, exponentially expanding crescendo into nothingness and possible brain damage." Critic John Rockwell suggested that Bohor can be heard as part of a continuum of electronic works that include pieces by La Monte Young and John Cale, as well as Lou Reed's Metal Machine Music.

== Relation to later electronic works ==
Bohor marked the end of Xenakis's association with the GRM, and he would not work with taped sounds again until 1967, when he created the music for Polytope de Montréal using pre-recorded orchestral sounds. However, his interest in Bohor's sound world persisted over the years; the music he composed for the Polytope of Persepolis (1971) resembles Bohor in its use of noisy, layered sonorities and waves of intensity, while the music for the Polytope de Cluny (1972) was originally titled Bohor II.
