= Formalized Music =

Book by Iannis Xenakis

1971 edition

Formalized Music: Thought and Mathematics in Composition is a book by Greek composer, architect, and engineer Iannis Xenakis in which he explains his motivation, philosophy, and technique for composing music with stochastic mathematical functions. It was published in Paris in 1963 as Musiques formelles: nouveaux principes formels de composition musicale as a special double issue of La Revue musicale and republished in an expanded edition in 1981 in Paris by Stock Musique. It was later translated into English with three added chapters and published in 1971 by Indiana University Press, republished in 1992 by Pendragon Press with a second edition published in 2001, also by Pendragon. The book contains the complete FORTRAN program code for one of Xenakis's early computer music composition programs GENDY. It has been described as a groundbreaking work.

== Editions ==
- Xenakis, Iannis. 1963. Musiques formelles: nouveaux principes formels de composition musicale. Special issue of La Revue musicale, nos. 253–254. Paris: Editions Richard-Masse.
- Xenakis, Iannis. 1971. Formalized Music: Thought and Mathematics in Composition, translated by Christopher Butchers (chapters 1–6), G. W. Hopkins (chapter 7), and Mr. and Mrs. John Challifour (chapter 8). Bloomington and London: Indiana University Press.
- Xenakis, Iannis. 1981. Musiques formelles: nouveaux principes formels de composition musicale, expanded edition, Paris: Stock Musique. ISBN 2234015103.
- Xenakis, Iannis. 1992. Formalized Music: Thought and Mathematics in Composition, second, revised English edition, with additional material translated by Sharon Kanach. Harmonologia Series No. 6. Stuyvesant, NY: Pendragon Press. ISBN 1-57647-079-2. Reprinted Hillsdale, NY: Pendragon Press, 2001.
