= Georges Pludermacher =

French pianist (born 1944)

Georges Pludermacher (born 26 July 1944) is a French classical pianist. He leads an international solo career and performs in the most prestigious festivals.

== Biography ==
Born in Guéret, Pludermacher began playing the piano at the age of three. He entered the Conservatoire de Paris at eleven and proved to be a brilliant student with his teachers: Lucette Descaves, Jacques Février, Henriette Puig-Roget, Geneviève Joy. He then perfected his skills at the summer courses in Lucerne with Géza Anda. At 19, he left the conservatory with 3 first prizes: piano, chamber music and accompaniment. In 1967, inspired by his interest in contemporary music, he premiered André Boucourechliev's Archipel I and four years later, Iannis Xenakis's Synaphaï. He worked with ensembles such as the Domaine musical and the Ensemble Musique Vivante.

International awards soon followed in the 1960s and 1970s. Pludermacher, who also likes chamber music, performed with Christian Ferras, Nathan Milstein, Ivry Gitlis, Yvonne Loriod, Michel Portal, Christian Ivaldi, Ernst Haefliger, Yuri Bashmet. He also formed a duet with Jean-François Heisser. From 1968, he became solo pianist of the Paris Opera Orchestra. His concert career led him to perform with great conductors, such as Sir Georg Solti and the Chicago Symphony Orchestra, Pierre Boulez and the London Sinfonietta, Christoph von Dohnányi and the Orchestre National de France. He has been invited to festivals in Aix-en-Provence, Avignon, Strasbourg, Salzburg, Montreux, Vienna, Edinburgh, Florence, Barcelona, Madrid, and in 2003 as part of the masterclasses of the Académie française de Musique of Kyoto.

== Prizes ==
- 1968: Laureate of the Vianna da Motta International Music Competition of Lisbon
- 1969: Leeds International Piano Competition
- 1979: Prize of the Concours Géza Anda in Zurich
- 1987: Grand Prix of the Académie Charles-Cros for his recording of the Diabelli Variations
- 1995: Grand Prix of the Académie du disque français for the Debussy's Études recording.

== Some recordings ==
- Debussy's pieces for piano (2003)
- Beethoven's 5 piano concertos, Orchestre de Bretagne, dir. Moshe Atzmon (2004)
- Maurice Ravel's complete work for piano, Flâneries musicales de Reims (2007)
- Beethoven's complete piano sonatas and Diabelli Variations
- Symphony No. 3 in E flat major Op.55 "Eroica" transcribed for piano by Franz Liszt (1986)
- Theme from "Love Story" original motion picture soundtrack (1970)
