= Aristotelis Koundouroff =

Greek composer

- Αριστοτέλης Κουντούρωφ
- Born: Aristotelis Koundouroff; 29 December 1896; Tbilisi, Russian Empire
- Died: 8 July 1969 (aged 72); Volos, Greece
- Occupations: Composer, teacher

Aristotelis Koundouroff (Greek: Αριστοτέλης Κουντούρωφ) (1896–1969) was a Greek composer of the modern era. He is regarded as one of the most noteworthy figures of modern Greek music.

== Biography ==
He was born in 1896 to a Greek family in the city of Tbilisi, Russian Empire (now Georgia). He was the son of the Georgios Koundouros, a merchant from the island of Crete. The family's original surname, was Koundouros (Κούνδουρος) but his father altered the surname to Koundouriadis (Κουντουριάδης) and eventually Koundouroff. From an early age he took piano lessons, together with his brothers, from the pianist Ilya Eisberg, a pupil of Nikolai Rimsky-Korsakov. In 1922 Aristotelis won first place in the Symphonic Music Competition of Caucasian Composers.

He attended the conservatories of Tbilisi (1924–25) and Moscow (1927–30), studying with Ippolitov-Ivanov, Glière and Vasilenko. He became head of Ippolitov-Ivanov's composition studio in Moscow. In 1930, he settled in Greece and he taught musical theory at the Piraeus League Conservatory (1931–32) and Woldemar Freeman's Musical Lycee (1932–38). He conducting the Nea Ionia municipal band (1938–41). From 1943 until his retirement in 1964, he was head of the music library and sound archives of Athens Radio.

Koundouroff is now regarded as one of the most noteworthy figures of Greek music in the period 1930 to 1960. His earlier compositions (e.g. Suite-fantaisie sur des themes populaires grecs (1930–31), Sinfonietta (1934) etc.) show the influence of his Russian training, and of Prokofiev's `Soviet' style. Later works, including the tone poem Orpheus and Eurydice (1962) and the Mazurka for piano (1963), are harmonically more adventurous, inviting comparison with the more radical Russian modernists such as Skriabin and Roslavets. Among his noteworthy students were avant-garde composer Iannis Xenakis and musician Vangelis.

== Works ==
- Stage: Pastorale (ballet), The Village Bastundji, Orch: Tales]; Icarus; Suite-fantaisie sur des themes populaires grecs; Sinfonietta, 1934; Marche militaire; March on a Revolutionary Cretan Folk Theme; Larghetto; Premonition; Corfu; Orpheus and Euridyce,
- Choral: Chorus for G. Xenopoulos's play Sabbath of the Souls; I zoi en tafo; 2 Frags. from the Suite `Pictures from the Revolutionary Gallery of Painting'; Triumphal Cant. on the 70th Anniversary of M.M. Ippolitov-Ivanov; G. Stambolis
- Other solo vocal: Dim Distant Tales; I Came to You; transcr. of N. Lambelet: The Rose Bush and the Cypress
