= Monts de Gueret Animal Park =

Zoo in Creuse department, France

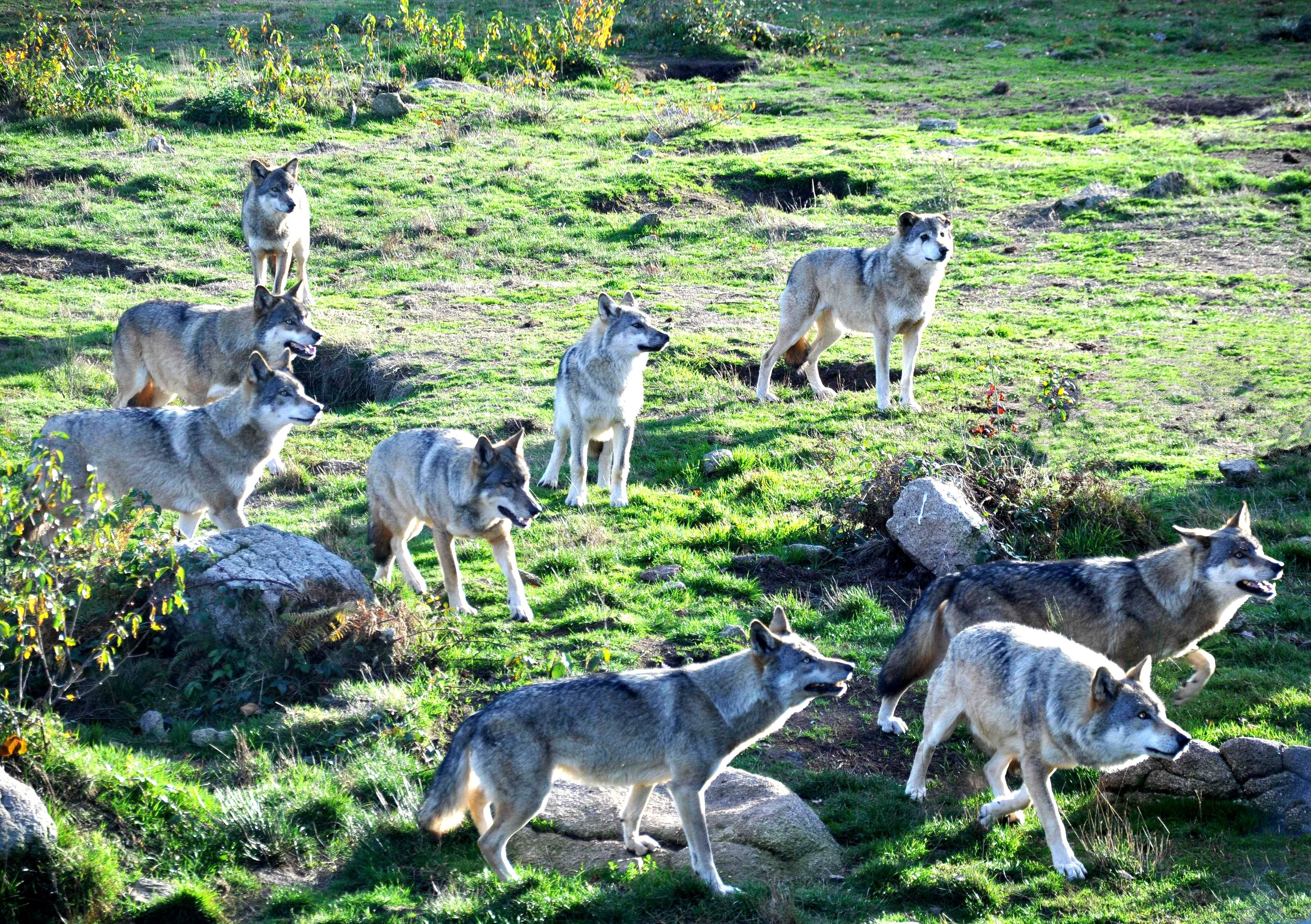
- European grey wolves during the "feeding show" in the park
- Interactive map of Monts de Gueret Animal Park
- 46.126890°N 1.891300°E
- Date opening: 2001
- Location: Chabrières forest, Guéret, Creuse department, France
- Land area: over 13 hectares (32 acres)
- No. of animals: over 50 (wolves)
- No. of species: one major
- Annual visitors: 42,000 (in 2014)
- Major exhibits: House of the Wolf; Observatory
- Owner: Grand Gueret Urban Community
- Website: www.loups-chabrieres.com

The Monts de Gueret animal park — The Wolves of Chabrières (French: Parc animalier des monts de Guéret — Les Loups de Chabrières) is a 13 hectares (32 acres) public animal park located close to Guéret in the commune and the prefecture of the Creuse department, Limousin, central France.

The park regularly receives biology and animal psychology students who do field studies of the animals. The students come from universities in Paris, Marseille, Limoges, Poitiers, Bordeaux, Rennes, Tours, Liège and also from the National veterinary school of Alfort.

The park supports organizations such as FERUS and loup.org, in protecting the wolves of Europe.

International Wolf Center also set up several programmes, helping to protect wolves.

== History ==
The Monts de Gueret animal park was created following a public initiative in 2001 and belongs to the Grand Gueret urban community. The park is located in the central part of Chabrières forest, a few miles from the town of Gueret in the department of Creuse, France.

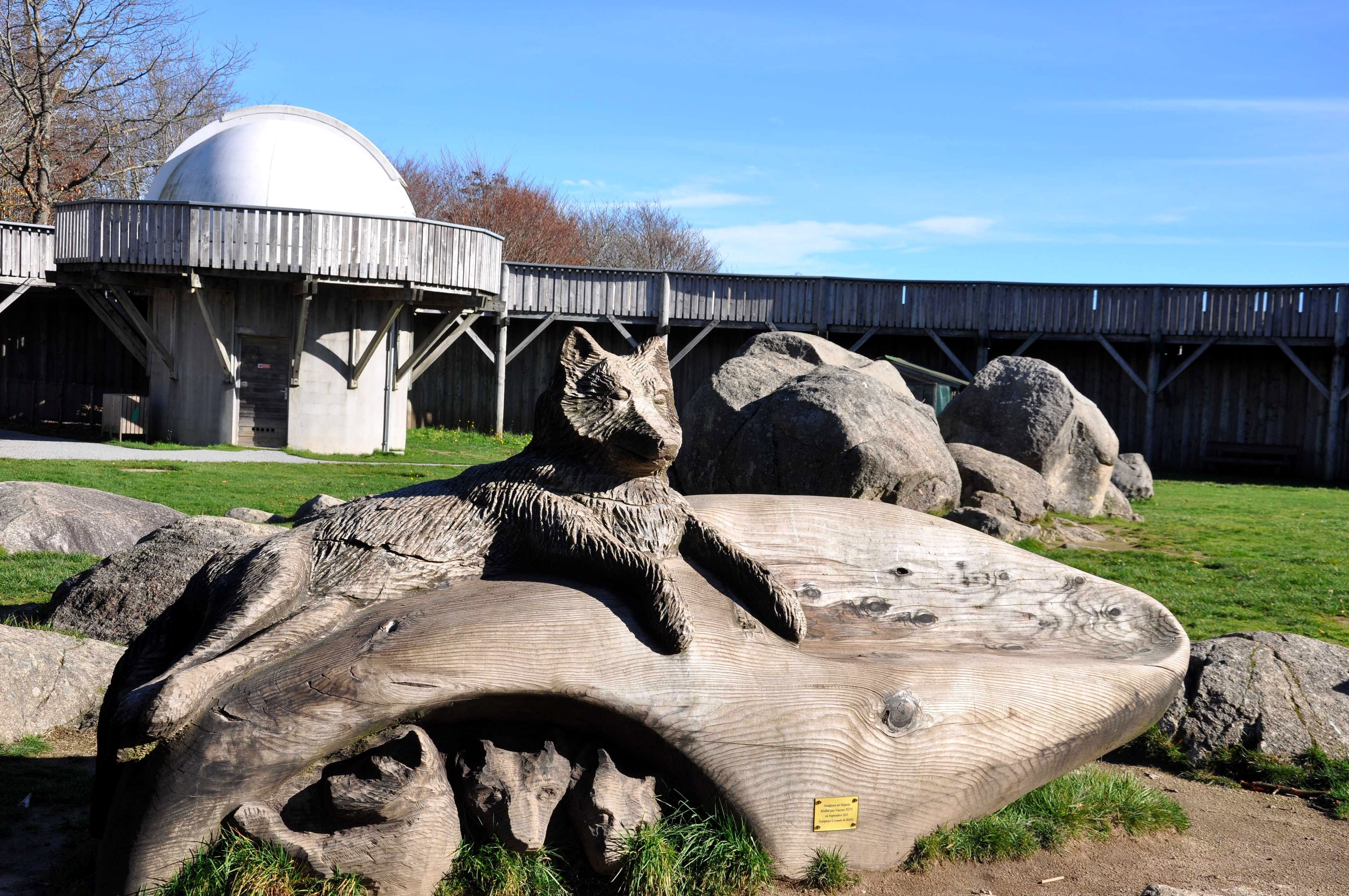
The observatory in the park

The park complex is built of wood in the style of a Gallic village; some rocks located within the park territory are decorated with wolves images in an ancient Celtic style, reflecting myths and legends of the past, where wolves are presented as beings, strongly connected to the world of the stars, planets and constellations. The observatory built within the Park Circle also emphasizes this idea.

European grey wolves historically populated the forests of Creuse, but the last one died in 1937. Now wolves inhabit the Chabrières forest again: 23 European grey wolves live in semi-freedom inside two forested enclosures covering a combined area of 11,000 m^{2} (120,000 sq ft). During the last years, the park extended the variety of wolves types, and smaller packs of ice white Mackenzie wolves, black Mackenzie wolves and white arctic wolves have been added to the population of the European grey wolves, the type most represented in the park.

2015 marked a new era for the animal park: new wolf packs of different types started to arrive, as well as new species of different animals, all of which will join the deers, roe deers, wild boars, badgers and foxes already living there.

Since it was opened in 2001 and up to the summer of 2015, the park has been visited by over half a million visitors. In 2014, the number of visitors was 42,000, and it is estimated that the number will increase by 15% in 2015.

In 2013, one of the male grey wolves managed to escape from the park through a fence that had been cut open.

== Wolves ==
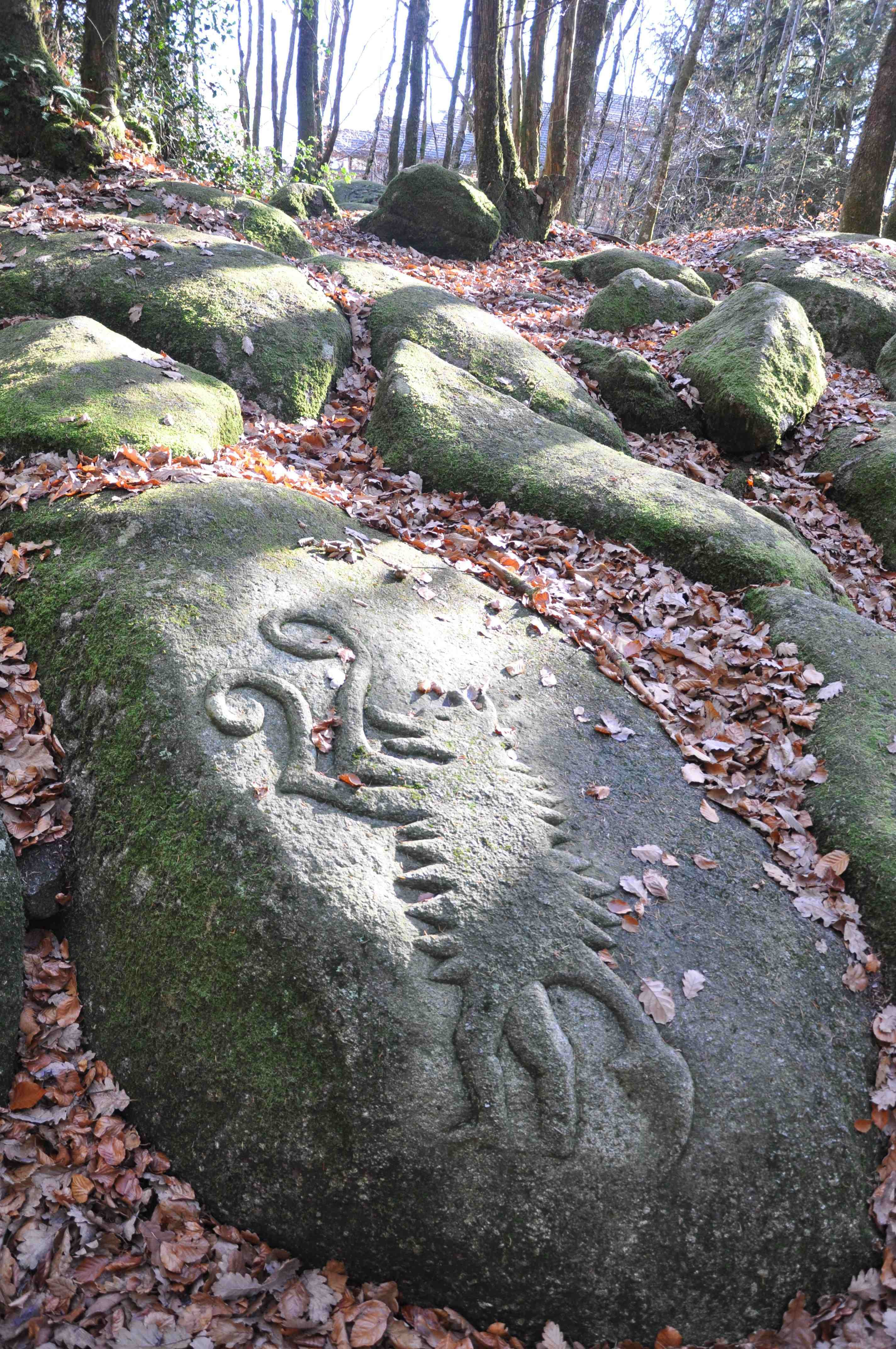
Image of a wolf in ancient Celtic style

European grey wolves, ice white Mackenzie wolves, black Mackenzie wolves and white arctic wolves, are all living separately in the different parts of the park and can not interact physically.

The wolves' habitat in the park is designed to let the predators' wild lifestyle be as close to natural as possible, but only the pack of European grey wolves have the privilege to live and hunt within the two areas of forested land with their lake.

In 2013, two white arctic wolf cubs were born for the first time in the park.

During the daily feeding in Chabrières Park, the European grey wolves fight for relatively small pieces of meat, which employees of the wolf park throw from the public observation deck as a spectacle for viewers and a welcome snack for the wolves. The real hunt, cruel but natural for predators, begins when the audience leaves and the pack hunts for prey under the leadership of the alpha wolf, the male or female with the highest rank in the pack.

The documentary film Lobo, wolf of Chabrières, created at the request of the wolf park, tells the story of the life of Lobo the cub (as a rule, in the wild only the highest rank pair, the alpha wolves, can produce pups). Born in Chabrières and growing up in his pack of European grey wolves, a community that lives according to the natural laws of their species, the film displays the various behaviours of each individual wolf and the complex relationships based on their status in the pack. The ten-minute-long film presents Lobo's life from birth and adolescence, full of games of learning, to the time when he, a strong adult, gains the status of alpha wolf by his ingenuity, strength and courage during the hunts.

== Museum ==
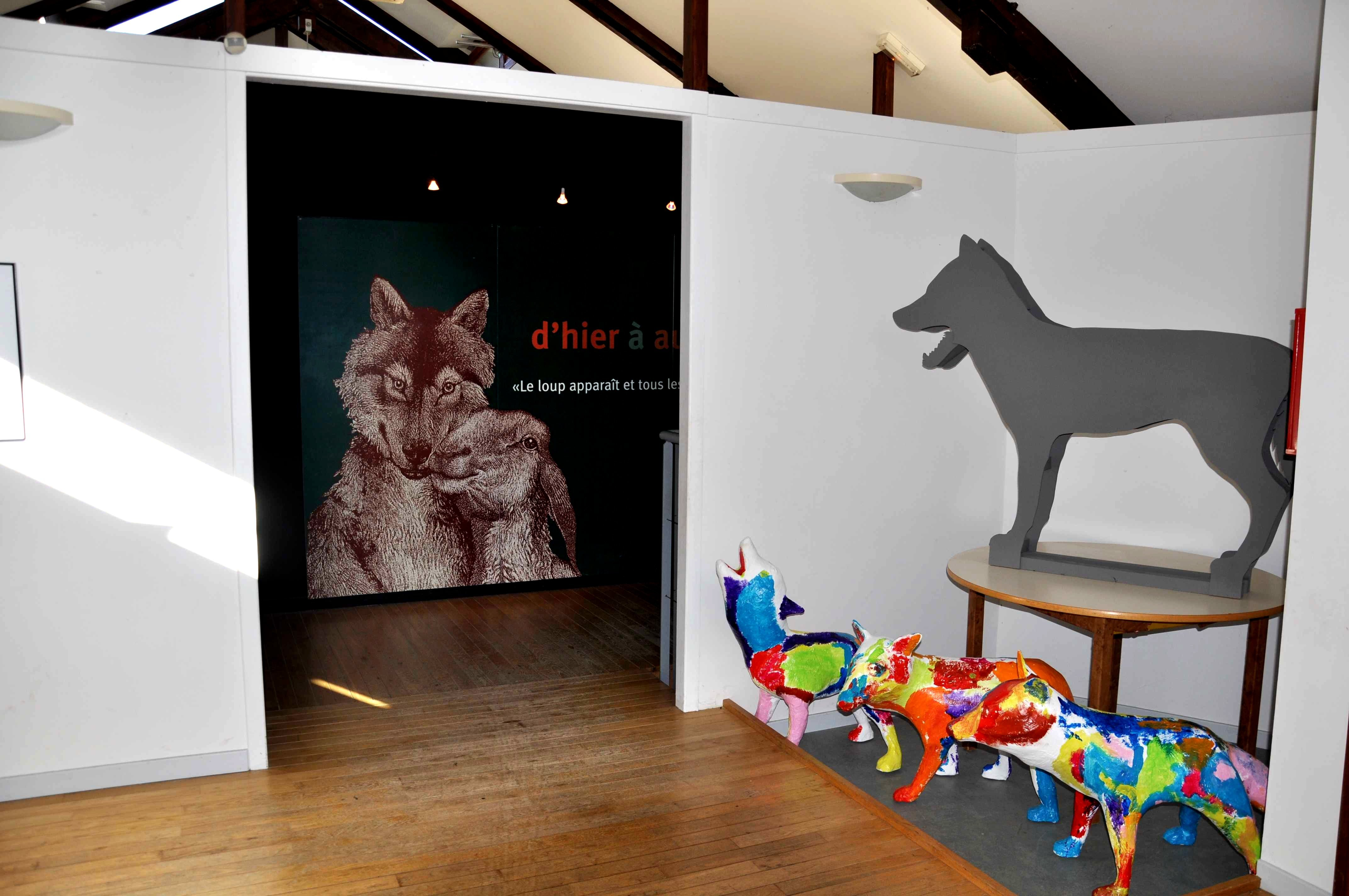
Inside the museum

A museum in the Chabrières park is the House of the Wolf. It covers 250 m^{2} (2,700 sq ft) and exhibits a wealth of information about wolves; from the tales, myths and legends, to scientific materials, related to all aspects of the wolves' life and the human/wolf relationships. Also highlighted in the museum exhibition are the history of destruction of wolves' habitats and the recent positive changes, leading to the movement of protection of the wolves around the world, institutionalized by an international agreement which took place in Washington and Bern. The latest works of scientists, studying wolves' physiology and psychology, including vocal behaviours, are also well represented in the museum.

== Wolves' songs ==
The Wolves of Chabrières park organizes field studies of wolves' vocal behaviour, where college students and the public can listen the songs of wolves during night walks in the forest. Vocal communication is one of many ways, that wolves use to indicate their mood and intentions, and consists of barks, whines, growls and howls, which can be solo, or chorus where two or more wolves are involved.

The wolf pack howls on average for 85 seconds. It is usually started by a single wolf, after which other wolves may join in. The pack leader, the alpha wolf, usually uses a lower-pitched howl and howls more frequently than wolves standing on the lower rungs of the pack's hierarchy. Although some functions of the howling are still unknown by scientists, they believe that wolves may howl to scare off other wolf packs from their territory and to gather their own pack, as wolves possess perfect hearing and their howling can be heard for up to 6 mi (9.7 km) in the forest and 10 mi (16 km) in open space. Researchers have found a relationship between the number of times a wolf howls and the strength of their relationship with other pack members. According to Friederike Range, co-director of the University of Vienna's Wolf Science Center, "the strength of the relationship between wolves predicted how many times a wolf howled."

According to the wolf-watching group Alliance avec les loups, the howling of wolves, a species that is quickly spreading through the whole of France, could possibly become a common sound even in the countryside around Paris, as Telegraph newspaper claims.

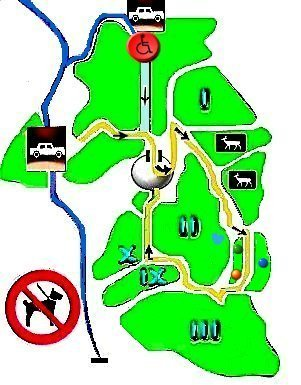
Wolf park map. Dark blue line – Main road Yellow line – Footpath Big white Circle – Starting point, from where the public starts a tour of the animal park. I – Ice White Wolves Mackenzie space. II – European Grey Wolves space. III – European Grey Wolves space. IХ - Black wolves Makenzie space. Х - Arctic white wolves space. Blue dot – Boars space. Green dot – Foxes space. Orange dot – Badgers space.

== See also ==
- List of astronomical observatories
