= Antoine Varillas =

French historian (1624–1696)

Antoine Varillas (1624 – 9 June 1696) was a French historian, best known for his history of heresy.

== Life ==
He was born in Guéret and made a troubled way as a man of letters in Paris. He worked as a historian for Gaston, Duke of Orléans. Through an introduction from Pierre Dupuy, he was able to have library access, leading to work on manuscripts for Jean-Baptiste Colbert. Colbert, however, was dissatisfied with his work and replaced him. Varillas enjoyed support from Pierre Huet but became a marginal figure.

== Works ==
His writings attracted a great deal of interest amongst his contemporaries; serious if partisan criticisms of the historical method of his earlier work led to his losing his reputation as a scholar. His works included:

- Histoire de l'heresie de Viclef, Iean Hus, et Jerome de Prague: avec celle des guerres de Bohéme qui en ont esté les suites;
- Histoire de Louis Onze; and
- Histoire des révolutions arrivées dans l'Europe.
