= Guéret =

Prefecture and commune in Nouvelle-Aquitaine, France

Guéret Garait (Occitan)
- Prefecture and commune
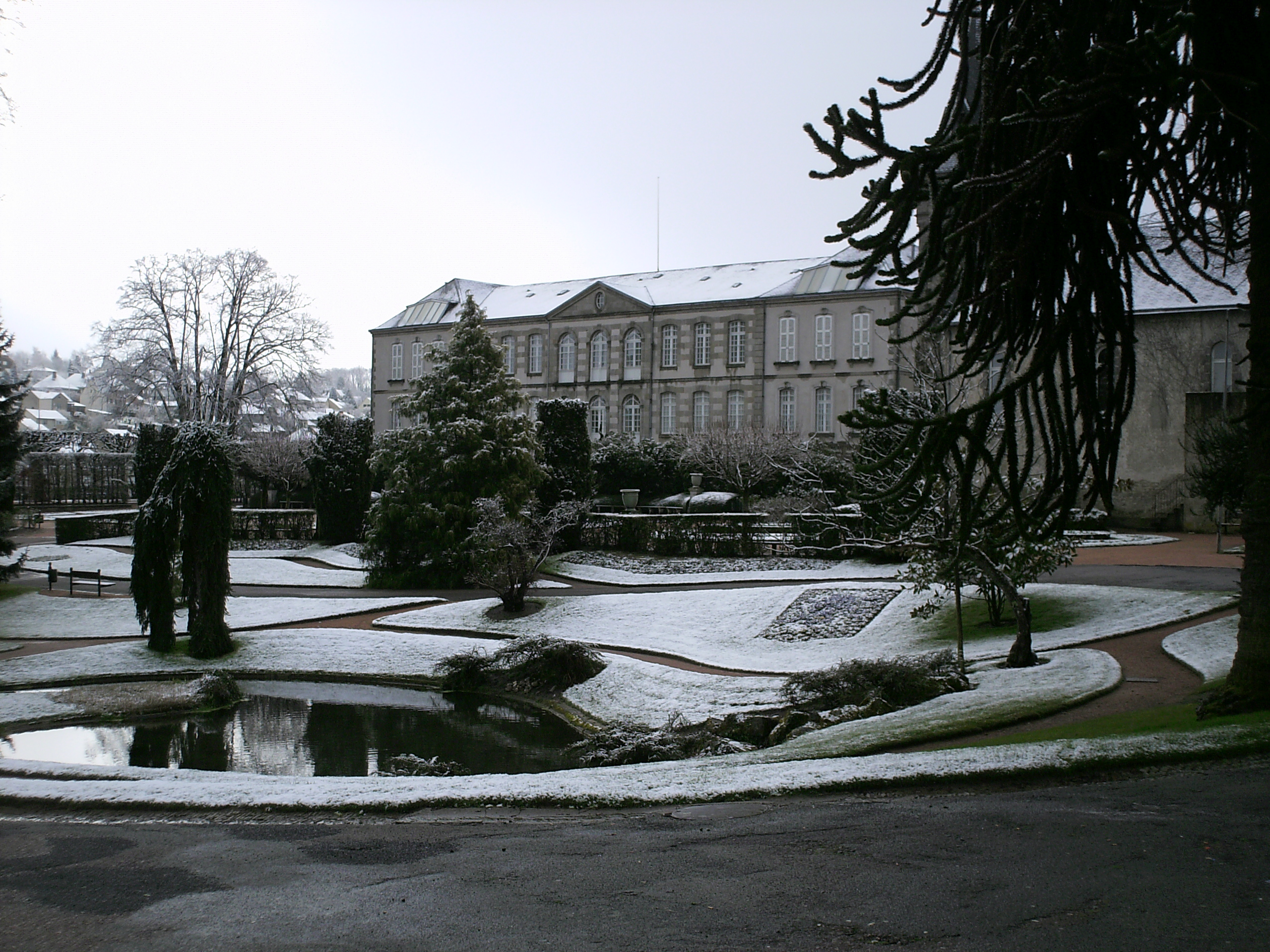
- The park and the Sénatorerie Museum, in Guéret

- Coat of arms
- Location of Guéret
- Location within France Location within Nouvelle-Aquitaine
- Coordinates: 46°10′17″N 1°52′09″E
- Country: France
- Region: Nouvelle-Aquitaine
- Department: Creuse
- Arrondissement: Guéret
- Canton: Guéret-1 and 2
- Intercommunality: CA Grand Guéret

Government
  - Mayor (2020–2026): Marie-Françoise Fournier
- Area^{1}: 26.21 km^{2} (10.12 sq mi)
- Elevation: 436 m (1,430 ft)
- Highest elevation: 685 m (2,247 ft)
- Lowest elevation: 350 m (1,150 ft)
- Population (2023): 12,955
  - Density: 494.3/km^{2} (1,280/sq mi)
- Time zone: UTC+01:00 (CET)
  - Summer (DST): UTC+02:00 (CEST)
- INSEE/Postal code: 23096 /23000
- ^{1} French Land Register data, which excludes lakes, ponds, glaciers > 1 km^{2} (0.386 sq mi or 247 acres) and river estuaries.

Guéret (French: [ɡeʁɛ]; Occitan: Garait) is a commune and the prefecture of the Creuse department in the Nouvelle-Aquitaine region in central France.

== Geography ==
Guéret is a light industrial town, the largest in the department, with a big woodland and some farming not far from the town centre. It is approximately 80 kilometres (50 mi) by road northeast of Limoges at the junction of the D942, D940 and the N145 roads.

Map of the Creuse department

== History ==
Guéret grew up round an abbey founded in the 7th century. In later times it became the capital of the County of La Marche.

== Population ==
Historical population
Year	Pop.	±% p.a.
1968	12,849	—
1975	14,855	+2.09%
1982	15,720	+0.81%
1990	14,706	−0.83%
1999	14,123	−0.45%
2007	14,066	−0.05%
2012	13,219	−1.23%
2017	13,161	−0.09%
2023	12,955	−0.26%
Source: INSEE

== Sights ==
- The church of St. Pierre and St. Paul, dating from the thirteenth century.
- The Hotel de Moneyroux (incorrectly called "Castle of the Counts of Marche", as no count ever lived in Guéret). This building, of Gothic style, was constructed in the fifteenth century by Antoine Allard (1839-1896). It is now the headquarters of the General Council of the Creuse. It can be visited during public holidays.
- The Presidial, dating from the seventeenth century. This building houses the town hall.
- The Museum of the Sénatorerie. Partly built in eighteenth century, the building served as the residence of senators under Napoleon. Since 1832, the Society of Archaeological and Natural Sciences of the Creuse, one of the oldest learned societies of France has been housed here. It brings together natural history collections and works of art. In 1907, the Hotel de la Sénatorerie museum was surrounded by a park and trees.
- The war memorial.
- The seventeenth-century chateau of Sainte Feyrer, built on the foundations of a castle from the Middle Ages, of which there are some remains. The building of the eighteenth century was constructed by the architect Brousseau. It has an elegant staircase and the oratory is classified as a historical monument.
- A vast permanent labyrinth is located 5 kilometres (3.1 mi) south of Guéret.
- Courtille lake, a recreation area south of Guéret, is an artificial lake along a shaded path. With a circumference of about 3 km, it is used for sports and leisure (running, sailing, walking) or picnicking on the grass.
- Chabrières forest is large and stretches south of Guéret. It includes: A zoo, where one can see wolves in semi-liberty in large enclosures. Opened in 2001, it is a noted site in the field of protection of this species. There are some huge natural monoliths, such as "la Pierre Grole" linked to local myths and legends and some old granite quarries, once used mainly for cobblestones of the streets of Paris.

== Climate ==
Guéret has an oceanic climate (Köppen Cfb) influenced by its elevation and proximity to the Bay of Biscay's maritime inflow of Gulf Stream air. As a result, the climate is mild for its latitude, wet and also relatively gloomy.

Climate data for Guéret Bongeot (1981–2010 normals, extremes 1975–2017)
Month	Jan	Feb	Mar	Apr	May	Jun	Jul	Aug	Sep	Oct	Nov	Dec	Year
Record high °C (°F)	18.7 (65.7)	23.0 (73.4)	24.5 (76.1)	29.6 (85.3)	31.5 (88.7)	37.0 (98.6)	38.0 (100.4)	39.1 (102.4)	33.5 (92.3)	28.5 (83.3)	25.4 (77.7)	20.5 (68.9)	39.1 (102.4)
Mean daily maximum °C (°F)	7.0 (44.6)	8.3 (46.9)	11.7 (53.1)	14.4 (57.9)	18.7 (65.7)	22.1 (71.8)	24.8 (76.6)	24.6 (76.3)	20.8 (69.4)	16.5 (61.7)	10.6 (51.1)	7.5 (45.5)	15.6 (60.1)
Daily mean °C (°F)	3.7 (38.7)	4.3 (39.7)	7.1 (44.8)	9.4 (48.9)	13.3 (55.9)	16.5 (61.7)	18.8 (65.8)	18.5 (65.3)	15.1 (59.2)	11.9 (53.4)	6.9 (44.4)	4.4 (39.9)	10.9 (51.6)
Mean daily minimum °C (°F)	0.5 (32.9)	0.4 (32.7)	2.4 (36.3)	4.3 (39.7)	8.0 (46.4)	11.0 (51.8)	12.8 (55.0)	12.4 (54.3)	9.4 (48.9)	7.3 (45.1)	3.2 (37.8)	1.3 (34.3)	6.1 (43.0)
Record low °C (°F)	−23.2 (−9.8)	−17.0 (1.4)	−14.7 (5.5)	−4.8 (23.4)	−2.0 (28.4)	1.0 (33.8)	4.0 (39.2)	2.0 (35.6)	−1.6 (29.1)	−8.0 (17.6)	−12.0 (10.4)	−13.6 (7.5)	−23.2 (−9.8)
Average precipitation mm (inches)	93.2 (3.67)	83.1 (3.27)	79.1 (3.11)	88.2 (3.47)	105.4 (4.15)	78.0 (3.07)	70.5 (2.78)	65.2 (2.57)	84.9 (3.34)	90.3 (3.56)	88.6 (3.49)	97.1 (3.82)	1,023.6 (40.30)
Average precipitation days (≥ 1.0 mm)	13.4	11.8	11.3	11.6	12.8	9.7	8.7	8.1	9.5	11.7	12.6	12.4	133.7
Mean monthly sunshine hours	79.1	97.2	137.4	138.8	177.8	169.3	219.2	242.5	183.9	122.1	82.5	63.2	1,710.7
Source 1: Meteociel
Source 2: Météo Climat (sun 1987–2010)

== Personalities ==
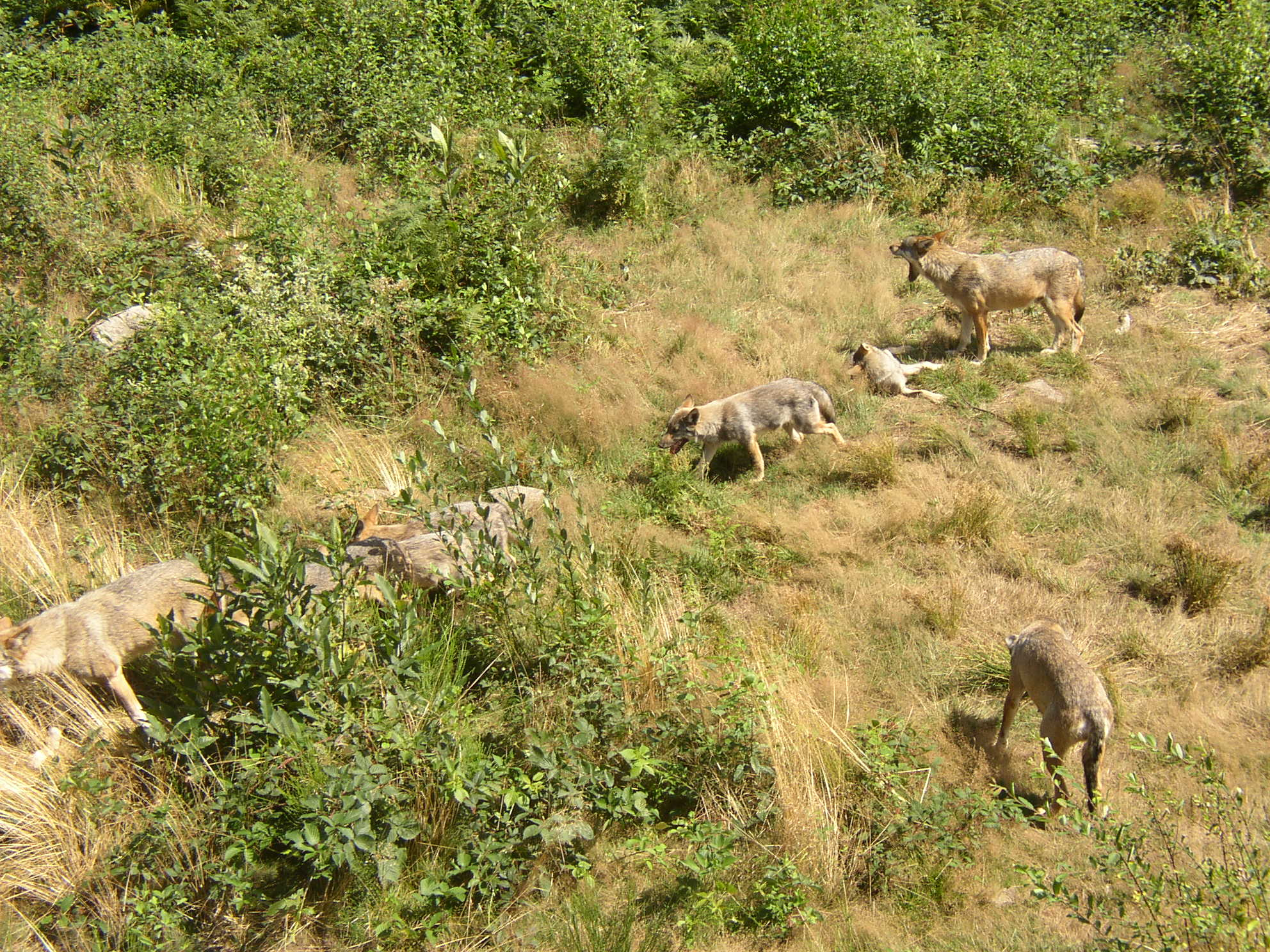
The wolves of Chabrières

- Antoine Varillas, a historian, was born here in 1624.
- Marcel Jouhandeau (1888–1979), writer, was born here.
- Madeleine Chapelle (1782–1849), the wife and model of painter Dominique Ingres.
- Georges Pludermacher (born 1944), classical pianist
- Pierre Michon (born 1945), writer, spent his childhood here.
- Pierre Petit (born 1957), racing driver
- Paul Petit (born 1993), racing driver

== International relations ==
Guéret is twinned with: Stein, Bavaria, Germany since 1991 and Puck, Poland

== See also ==
- Communes of the Creuse department
- Monts de Gueret Animal Park
