= Françoise Xenakis =

French novelist and journalist

- Born: Marguerite Claude Françoise Gargouïl; 27 September 1930; Blois, France
- Died: 12 February 2018 (aged 87); Courbevoie, France
- Occupation: Journalist
- Spouse: Iannis Xenakis (m. 1953; died 2001)
- Children: 1

Marguerite Claude Françoise Xenakis (née Gargouïl; 27 September 1930 – 12 February 2018) was a French novelist and journalist, born in Blois, Loir-et-Cher. She started her literary career in the early 1960s, and became better known during the 1980s, when she started working at Le Matin de Paris, a daily newspaper, and for Télématin, a breakfast television news show. She chaired the judging panel for the literary prize 30 Million Friends.

In 1953, she married Iannis Xenakis, who later went on to become an important classical composer of the post-war avant-garde. Their daughter Mâkhi Xenakis, sculptor, painter and writer, was born in 1956.

== Selected works ==
- Le Petit Caillou (1963)
- Des dimanches et des dimanches (1965)
- Aux lèvres pour que j'aie moins soif (1970)
- Écoute (1971)
- Et alors les morts pleureront (1972)
- Moi, j'aime pas la mer (1972)
- L'écrivain ou La sixième roue du carrosse (1975)
- Elle lui dirait dans l'île (1978)
- La Natte coupée (1982)
- Zut! on a encore oublié Madame Freud (1984)
- La Vie exemplaire de Rita Capuchon (1988)
- Le Temps usé (1992)
- Attends-moi (1993; won the Prix des libraires the same year)
- Désolée, mais ça ne se fait pas (1995)
- Chéri, tu viens pour la photo (1999)
- Mouche-toi, Cléopâtre (1999)
- Maman, je veux pas être empereur (2001)
- Regarde, nos chemins se sont fermés (2002)
- Danielle Mitterrand : la petite fille qui voulait être Antigone (2006)
