= Nomos Alpha =

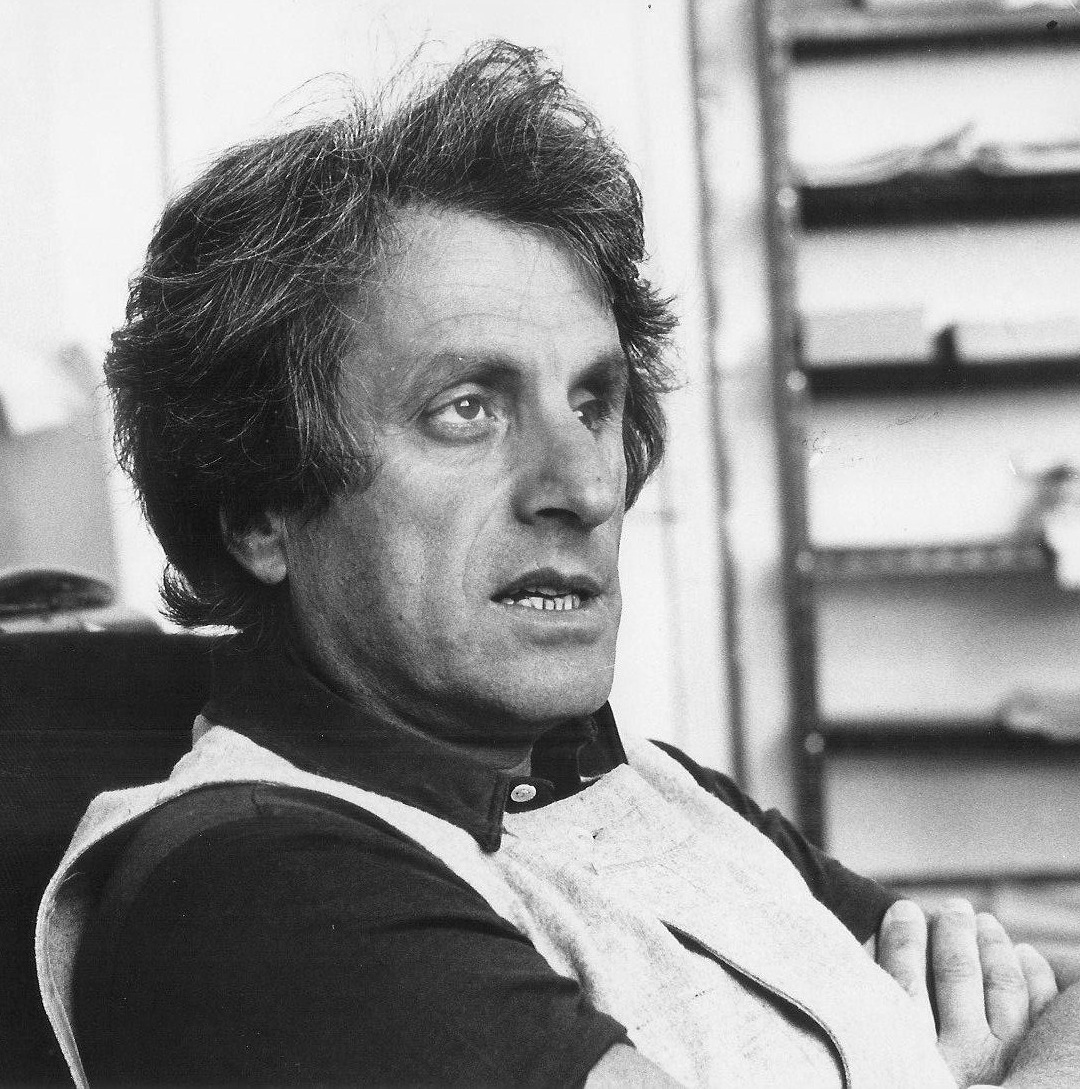
Xenakis in his Paris studio, c. 1970

Nomos Alpha (Greek: Νόμος α΄) is a piece for solo cello composed by Iannis Xenakis in 1965, commissioned by Radio Bremen for cellist Siegfried Palm, and dedicated to mathematicians Aristoxenus of Tarentum, Évariste Galois, and Felix Klein. This piece is an example of a style of music called, by Xenakis, symbolic music – a style of music which makes use of set theory, abstract algebra, and mathematical logic in order to create and analyze musical compositions. Along with symbolic music, Xenakis is known for his development of stochastic music.

During his lifetime, Xenakis was a vocal critic of modern Western music since the development of polyphony for its diminished set of outside-time structures, especially when compared to folk and Byzantine musical traditions. This perceived incompleteness of Western music was the main impetus for the development of symbolic music and for composing Nomos Alpha, his most well-known example of the genre.

Nomos Alpha consists of 24 sections divided into two layers. The first layer consists of every section not divisible by four, while the second layer consists of every fourth section.

== Layer 1 ==
Layer 1 of Nomos Alpha is determined by the 24-element octahedral group isomorphic to the rotations of a cube. The elements of the set are permutations and the binary operator is composition.

== Layer 2 ==
Layer 2 of Nomos Alpha—in contrast to Layer 1—is not determined by group theory, but is instead, a "continuous motion of registral evolution".

== Sources ==
- DeLio, Thomas, ed. (1985). Contiguous Lines: Issues and Ideas in the Music of the '60's and '70's. ISBN 0-8191-4330-8.
- DeLio, Thomas. "The Dialectics of Structure and Materials: Iannis Xenakis' Nomos Alpha". Cited in DeLio (1985).
- Xenakis, Iannis (1971). Formalized Music, pp. 219–236. Bloomington, Indiana: Indiana University Press.
