= Eonta =

- by Iannis Xenakis
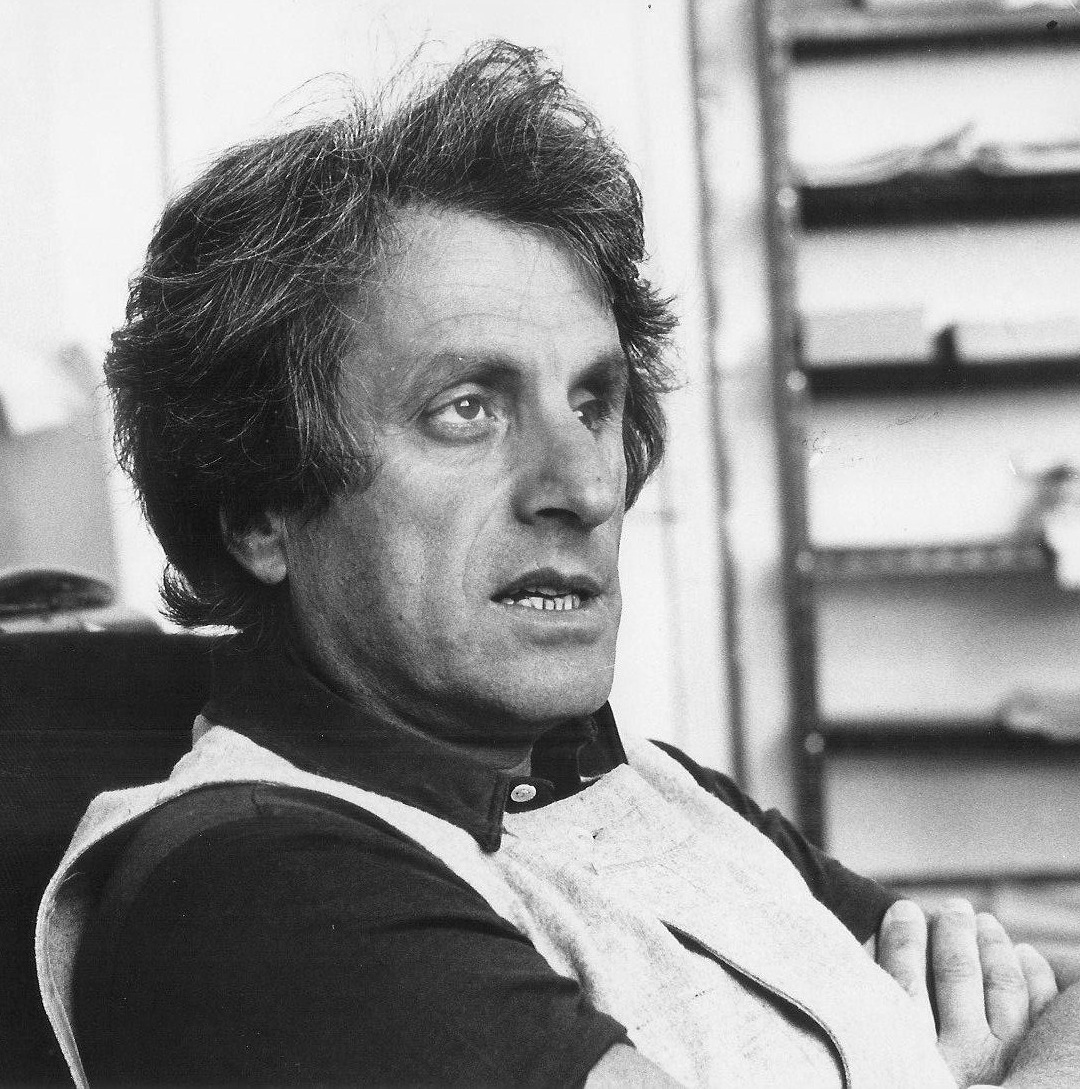
- Iannis Xenakis in his Paris studio, c. 1970
- Composed: 1963–64
- Performed: December 16, 1964
- Published: 1967
- Movements: 1
- Scoring: Piano, two trumpets, three tenor trombones

Eonta is a composition for piano, two trumpets, and three tenor trombones by Iannis Xenakis. It was written in 1963–64, and was premiered on December 16, 1964, by the Ensemble du Domaine Musical, with Yuji Takahashi on piano and Pierre Boulez conducting. (Takahashi had previously premiered Xenakis's solo piano work Herma.) Its duration is approximately 18 minutes.

== Background ==
Eonta was composed in response to a commission from the Domaine Musical in Paris. Xenakis recalled that the initial concept came to him while he was sitting in a boat at Tanglewood: "We were surrounded by a forest and I stroked the water with my hand. It was then that I first thought of the instruments to be used in Eonta." (In his notes, he wrote: "Reflection in water. Water is the piano.") The bulk of the composition was written in Berlin, where Xenakis was living thanks to a scholarship from the Ford Foundation, during 1963–64, although some of the music, such as the opening piano solo, were composed with the aid of an IBM 7090 computer located at the Place Vendôme in Paris. (Xenakis had persuaded IBM France to allow him to run implementations of his stochastic algorithms, written in Fortran and previously used in the composition of works such as Achorripsis, on their computer.)

According to Xenakis, Eonta, the title of which means "beings," the present participle of the Greek verb "to be," was composed in homage to Parmenides, who "realized the ontological essence of existence, of 'to be', and felt that existence couldn't consist of one instance only." The composer recalled: "As far as Eonta is concerned, the piece changes, of course, but is based on something constant."

== Compositional techniques ==
In his foreword to the score, Xenakis wrote: "The work makes use of stochastic music (based on the theory of probabilities) and of symbolic music (based on logistics)." (When asked about his use of the term "logistics," Xenakis stated that he was using the nineteenth-century term for symbolic logic) In composing the work, Xenakis defined a number of pitch sets and applied logical operations to them to yield new sets. Stochastic procedures were then used to determine the placement and ordering of notes within each set, often producing, as in the opening piano solo, "a vivid kaleidoscope in sound," or what the composer called "clouds consisting of sounds selected at random." As such, Eonta is an extension of Herma and the works of the "ST" series (ST/4, ST/10, and ST/48), which were based on similar techniques.

Dynamics were often determined statistically, with ppp and fff as extreme values. Xenakis stated: "There are passages where only one or the other occurs and also where every note has a different intensity. If the two are mixed it's natural that the nuances should also be mixed."

== Spatial aspects ==
Eonta was conceived with the layout of the performers in mind, and is one of the earliest of Xenakis's works that concern themselves with the movement of sounds in space. The brass players are asked to move to different positions on the stage, to raise and lower their bells and to move them to the right and left, to play into the open body of the piano in order induce sympathetic vibrations, and to circulate freely within a section of the stage.

== Performative considerations ==
In addition to presenting performers with technical challenges, Eonta demands a great deal of stamina. Yuji Takahashi wrote: "Xenakis wanted the performers physically exhausted during the performance, feeling that something was still going on beyond fatigue." According to Xenakis, he took the physical limitations of the performers into account, but also considered "the fact that what is limitation today may not be so tomorrow," an attitude which has proven to be true as the work has become one of his most popular pieces.

Prior to its premiere, Boulez declared that Eonta would be impossible to perform as written, stating "there are physical limits to the capacity of lips," and arranging for the use of two sets of brass players in rotation. Despite these misgivings, however, the following year, Constantin Simonovitch performed the work with the specified number of players. In addition to moving about the performance space, the brass players are asked to produce quarter tones, to play in extreme registers, to play with wide, varying ranges of vibrato, to produce glissandi, and to produce "beating" effects by playing near-unisons. The trombones are also asked to play tremolo glissandi which involve rapid movements of the slide. Trombonist Benny Sluchin emphasized the need to pace and carefully plan rehearsals for the brass players in order to avoid exhaustion and to choreograph their movements with regard to placement of mutes and parts, as well as keeping the conductor in view regardless of location.

Similar to Herma, the piano part is exceptionally difficult, often spanning the entire range of the keyboard with huge, quick leaps, and employing a wide range of dynamics. Yuji Takahashi, reflecting on these challenges, noted: "The 'rhythm' in... Eonta is stochastic: that is, the notation is only an approximation," and stressed the importance of the performer's ability to control "the sonority of each cloud that changes its colouring incessantly... a sort of generalized harmony (or the harmony in the ancient sense)." He concluded: "A performer is an adventurer who explores sonic nebulae following the star map provided by the composer. A composition is a model which is used again and again to open the door of perception. It will be modified, if necessary, and discarded when it is no longer valid."

== Reception ==
In a 1969 review, Bruce Archibald wrote:

The music of Iannis Xenakis is a stirring experience. It taps a terrible-wonderful elemental power that accelerates the pulse and fires the emotions. The very least it can do is convince a much too widespread public that music whose origins claim intellectualization is in no way less emotional, but may well be more so - heart and brain combined multiply their resources rather than cancelling them out... Those who would be turned off by the fact that Xenakis uses an IBM 7090 computer for certain aspects of this composition should listen intently to Eonta and check their pulses.

He concluded:

if all this makes you think 'cerebral' and 'cerebral' makes you think 'cold,' first listen to the music.

Reviewing a live performance of Eonta for the New York Arts web site, Gabriel Kellett stated that the movement of the brass players "presented a compelling argument for the cause of live music as being able to produce not only a stereoscopic effect very difficult for even the best home sound system to emulate, but an element of visual drama that in this case seemed somehow indivisible from the purely aural content of the piece. The music was as much the movement as the notes."

Writing for The Guardian, Ivan Hewett commented:

The passion in a work such as Eonta is not altogether human - it has the impersonal quality of a natural force, untrammelled by conventions of language or style. Such magnificently innocent music is bound to be out of place in our oblique, knowing age, so obsessed with its past, so fastidiously ironic, so concerned, in its art, to layer ambiguity upon ambiguity. That Xenakis could have denied this pervasive cultural trend for 40 years is an amazing feat. Perhaps only someone who had no need of the western tradition, someone whose roots lay elsewhere, could have done it.
