= Jason Xenakis =

Romanian-born Greek philosopher (1923–1977)

Jason Byron Xenakis (1923–1977) was a Romanian-born Greek philosopher, and for a time, a significant presence in American philosophical scholarship about Epictetus and Stoicism. Born into an affluent expatriate Greek family in Brăila, Romania, He is known for pioneering work on the philosophy of Epictetus, modern interpretations of Stoicism and works on the philosophy of suicide. As an academic, he contributed scholarly work in philosophy and logic. His best known work is his 1969 book Epictetus: Philosopher-therapist.

== Important articles and works ==
- Xenakis, J. (1953). A non-reductionist interpretation of Plato's ethics (Ph.D. thesis).
- Xenakis, J. (1957). "On the Theological Interpretation of Plato's Ethics". Harvard Theological Review. 50 (1): 67–70. doi:10.1017/S0017816000028388.
- Xenakis, J. (1957). Essence being and fact on Plato : an analysis of one of Theatetus' "koina". Kölner Universitätverlag.
- Xenakis, J. (1957). "Plato on statement and truth-value". Mind. 66 (262): 165–167. doi:10.1093/mind/LXVI.262.165.
- Xenakis, J. (1959). "Ordinary-language philosophy: Language, logic and philosophy". Synthese. 11 (3): 294–306. doi:10.1007/BF00486420.
- Xenakis, J. (1964). "Desupernaturalization". Journal for the Scientific Study of Religion. 3 (2): 181–188. doi:10.2307/1384507. JSTOR 1384507.
- Xenakis, J. (1968). "Logical Topics in Epictetus". The Southern Journal of Philosophy. 6 (2): 94–102. doi:10.1111/j.2041-6962.1968.tb02032.x.
- Xenakis, J. (1969). Epictetus: Philosopher-therapist. Martinus Nijhoff.
- Xenakis, J. (1973). "Hippies and cynics". Inquiry. 16 (1–4): 1–15. doi:10.1080/00201747308601680.
