= Herma (Xenakis) =

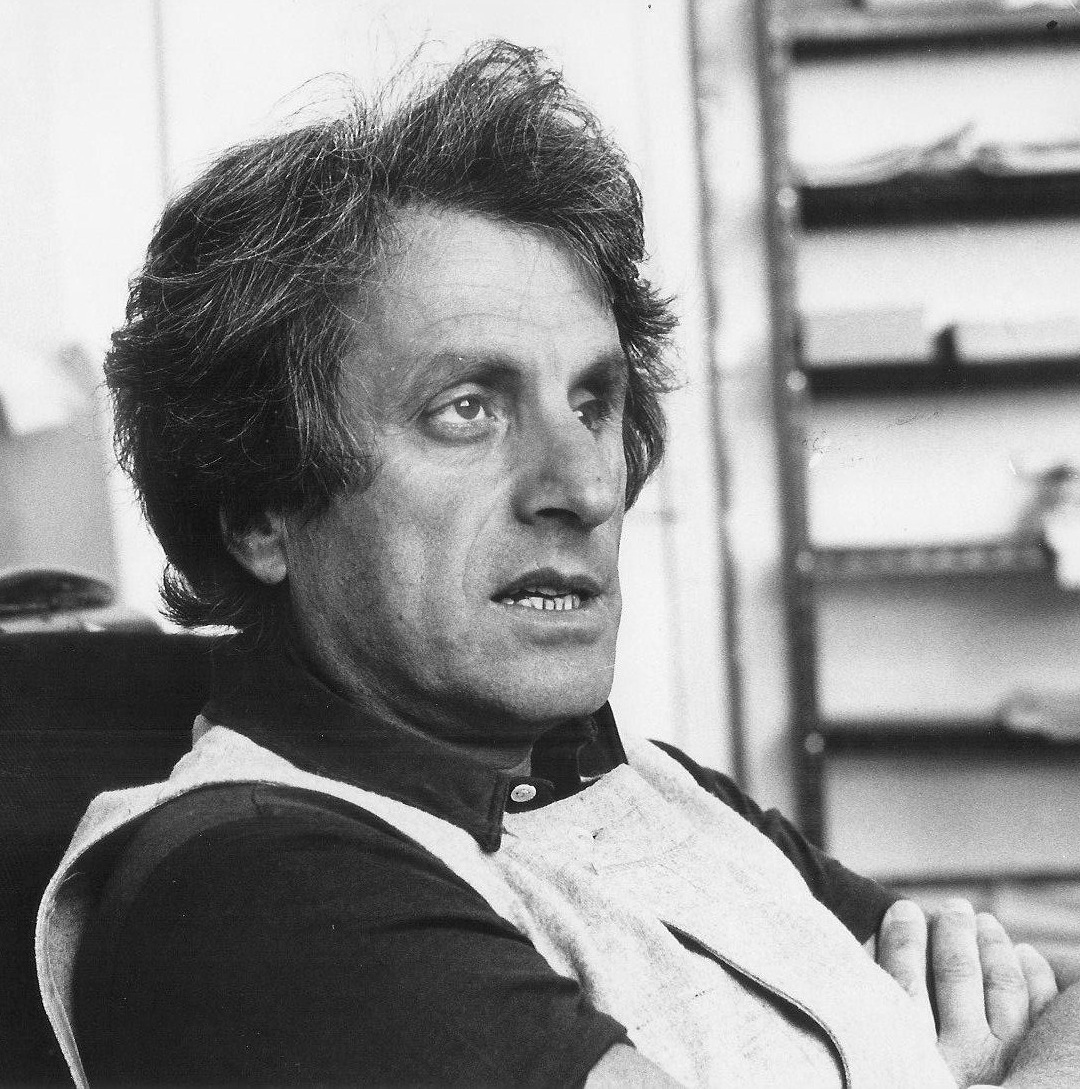
Iannis Xenakis in his Paris studio, c. 1970

Herma (from Greek ἕρμα "a stringing together, a foundation") is a piece for solo piano composed by Iannis Xenakis in 1961. About ten minutes long, it is based on a formulation of the algebraic equations of Boolean algebra, and is also an example of what Xenakis called symbolic music.

== Composition ==
Herma was the composer's first major work for piano. It was composed after a visit to Japan in 1961, where Xenakis befriended pianist and composer Yūji Takahashi. Xenakis completed the piece upon his return to Paris and dedicated it to Takahashi, who premièred the piece on February 2, 1962. The pianist's impression of that concert was that the piece "made some excited and wonder, others feel painful".

Boolean algebra is the main mathematical principle behind Herma. Xenakis defines several pitch sets and proceeds to apply various logical operations to them. The results are incorporated into music by using successions and combinations of various sets. Stochastic procedures are used to select the order and place of notes within each set.

The piece has been described by the pianist and critic Susan Bradshaw as "[deserving] the label of the most difficult piano piece ever written", because of its extreme tempo.
