= Diamorphoses =

- by Iannis Xenakis
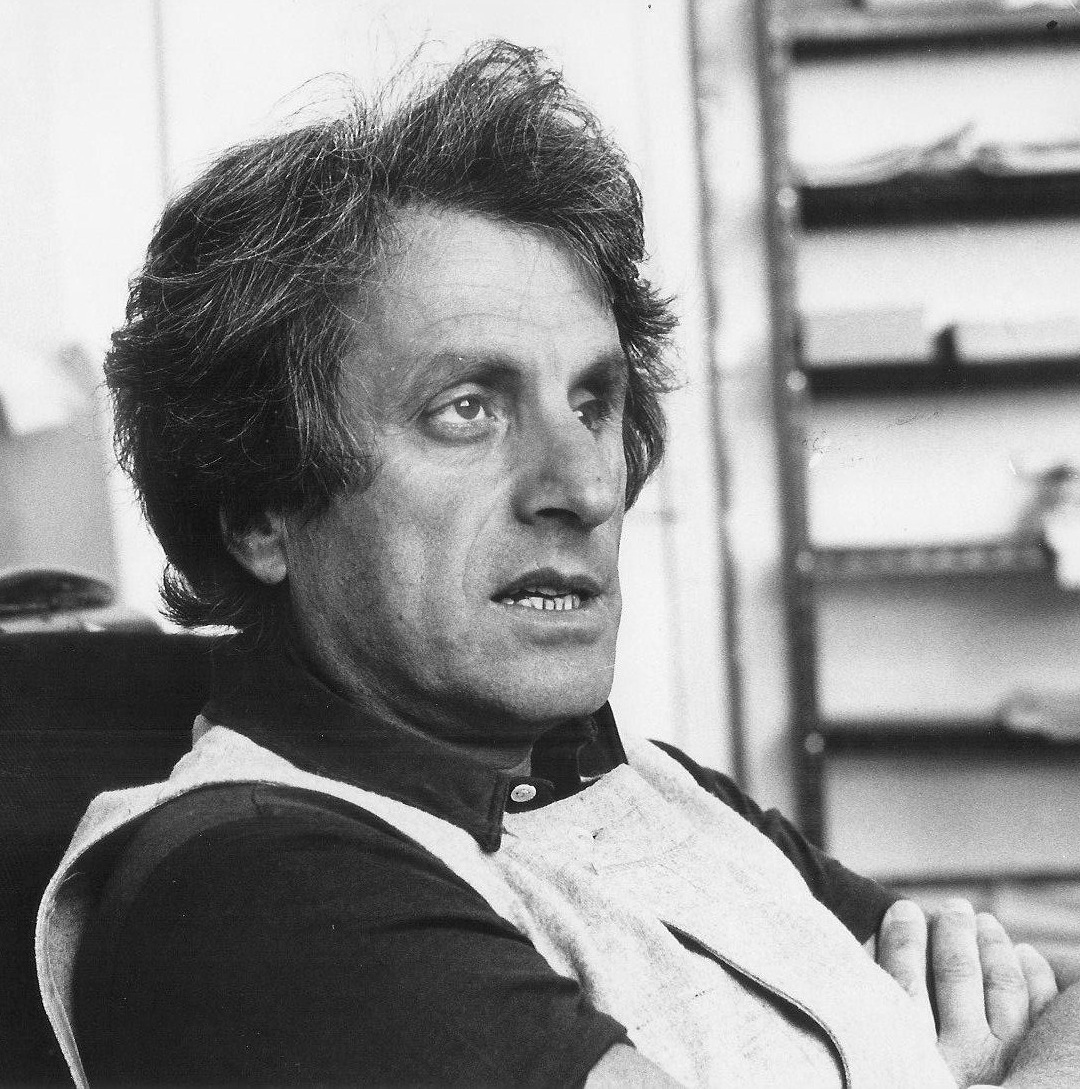
- Xenakis c.1970
- Genre: Electroacoustic music Musique concrète
- Composed: 1957: France
- Performed: 5 October 1958: Brussels
- Scoring: 2-track tape

Diamorphoses (Greek: Διαμορφώσεις) is the first electroacoustic composition by Greek composer Iannis Xenakis. It was created between 1957 and 1958 and is considered a masterpiece in several academic books on history of electroacoustic music.

== Composition ==
After the creation of the Radio France studio by Pierre Schaeffer in 1948, Iannis Xenakis became very interested in the possibilities of concrete music and electroacoustic music. By 1955, Xenakis started working in this studio as part of the Groupe des recherches musicales (French: Musical Research Group). In the particular case of Xenakis, just like Schaeffer, the sounds used in recordings were extracted from engines, trains and other natural and mechanical phenomena.

Xenakis released a set of recordings between 1957 and 1962, from which Diamorphoses was the first and most notable one. It was eventually finished and presented on October 5, 1958, in Brussels.

Diamorphoses was created on a 2-track tape and, therefore, has a fixed total length of 6 minutes and 57 seconds. It is typically played on at least four speakers.
