= Iannis Xenakis =

Greek-French composer, architect and engineer (1922–2001)

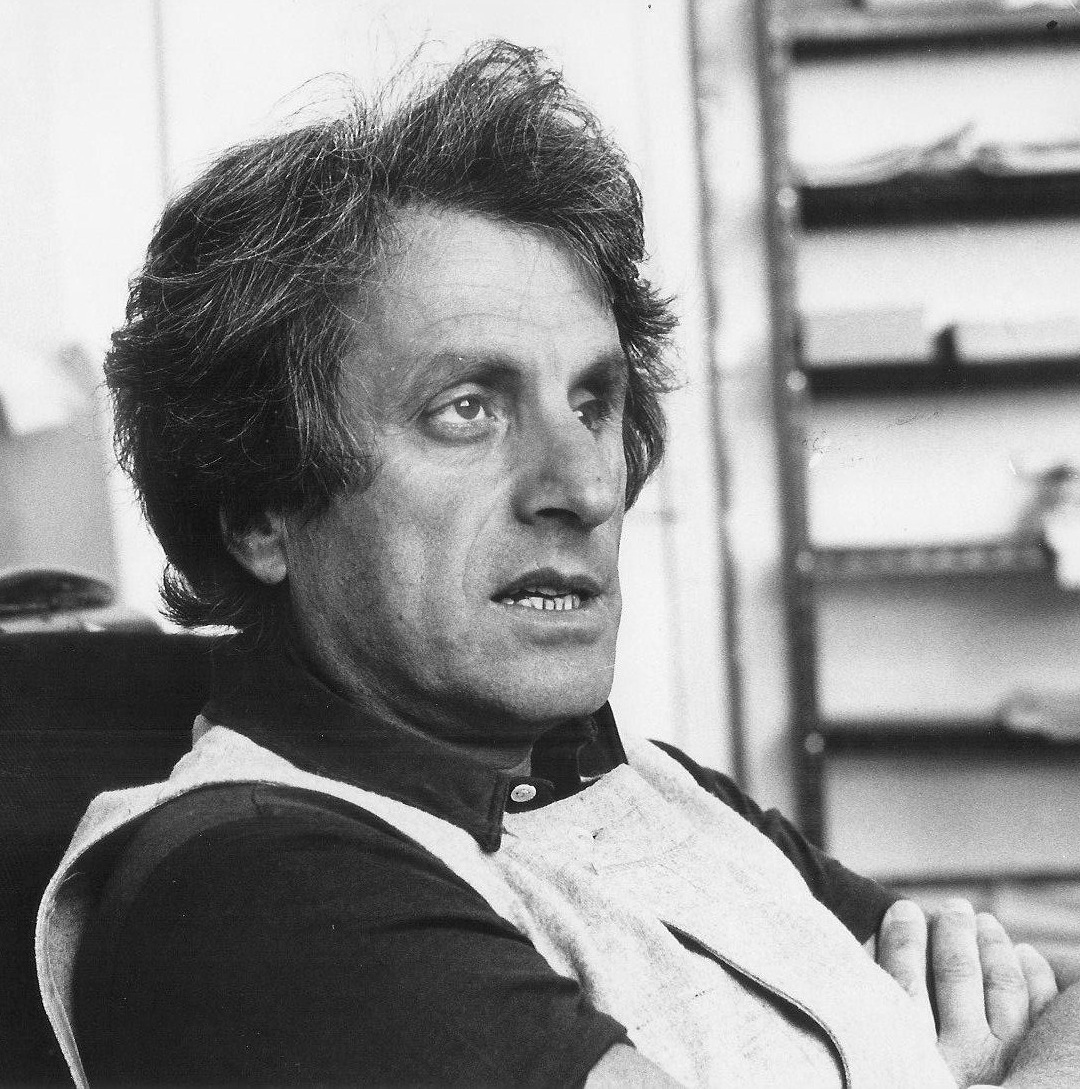
- Xenakis in his Paris studio, c. 1970
- Born: Giannis Klearchou Xenakis; 29 May 1922; Brăila, Romania
- Died: 4 February 2001 (aged 78); Paris, France
- Occupations: Composer, architect
- Years active: 1947–1997
- Works: List of compositions
- Spouse: Françoise Gargouïl (m. 1953)
- Children: 1

Giannis Klearchou Xenakis (also spelled for professional purposes as Yannis or Iannis Xenakis; Greek: Γιάννης "Ιάννης" Κλέαρχου Ξενάκης, pronounced [ˈʝanis kseˈnacis]; 29 May 1922 (Note: Xenakis' daughter, Mâkhi, states that his birth date may also be 29 May 1921. Some identifying documents, such as his birth certificate, use the 1921 date. In most other documents, 1922 is used. This article uses 1922, as it is the more commonly cited date.) – 4 February 2001) was a Romanian-born Greek-French avant-garde composer, music theorist, architect, performance director and engineer.

After 1947, he fled Greece, becoming a naturalised citizen of France eighteen years later. Xenakis pioneered the use of mathematical models in music such as applications of set theory, stochastic processes and game theory and was also an important influence on the development of electronic and computer music. He integrated music with architecture, designing music for pre-existing spaces, and designing spaces to be integrated with specific music compositions and performances.

Among his most important works are Metastaseis (1953–54) for orchestra, which introduced independent parts for every musician of the orchestra; percussion works such as Psappha (1975) and Pléïades (1979); compositions that introduced spatialization by dispersing musicians among the audience, such as Terretektorh (1966); electronic works created using Xenakis's UPIC system; and the massive multimedia performances Xenakis called polytopes, that were a summa of his interests and skills.

Among the numerous theoretical writings he authored, the book Formalized Music: Thought and Mathematics in Composition (French edition 1963, English translation 1971) is regarded as one of his most important publications. As an architect, Xenakis is primarily known for his early work under Le Corbusier: the priory of Sainte-Marie de La Tourette, on which the two collaborated, and the Philips Pavilion at the 1958 Brussels World's Fair (Expo 58), where Xenakis was the chief designer.

== Life ==
=== 1922–47: early years ===
Giannis Klearchou Xenakis was born in Brăila, Romania—which at the time had a large Greek community, as the eldest son of Greek parents; Klearchos Xenakis, a businessman from Kymi, Euboea who was managing director of an English export-import agency and one of the richest men in the city, and Fotini Pavlou from Lemnos, a pianist who also spoke German and French. His two younger brothers were Jason, who became a philosophy professor in the United States and Greece, and Kosmas, an architect, urban planner and artist.

His parents were both interested in music, and it was Pavlou who encouraged the young child to learn more about it: the young Giannis was given a flute by his mother, and the family visited the Bayreuth Festival several times, due to his father's interest in opera. Her early death in 1927, when Xenakis was five years old, was a traumatic experience that, in his own words, "deeply scarred" the future composer. She had previously been infected from measles and died after giving birth to a stillborn daughter.

He was subsequently educated by a series of English, French, and German governesses, and then, in 1932, sent to Greece to study at the Anargyrio-Korgialenio boarding school on the Aegean island of Spetses. He excelled in both academics and athletics and sang in the school's boys' choir, where the repertoire included works by Palestrina, and Mozart's Requiem, which Xenakis memorized in its entirety.

It was also at the Spetses school that Xenakis studied notation and solfège, being introduced to the music of Ludwig van Beethoven and Johannes Brahms and became enamoured of Greek traditional and church music. At the same time, he discovered the writer Homer and had a habit of visiting museums.

In 1938, after graduating from the school, Xenakis moved to Athens to prepare for entrance exams at its National Technical University, also studying Ancient Greek. He was encouraged by his friends and family to do so due to his interests in physics and mathematics. Although he intended to study architecture and engineering, he also took lessons in harmony and counterpoint with Aristotelis Koundouroff. In 1940, he successfully passed the exams, but his studies were cut short by the Greco-Italian War, which began with the Italian invasion on 28 October 1940. Although Greece eventually won the war, it was not long before the German army joined the Italians in the Battle of Greece, in April 1941.

This led to the Axis occupation of Greece during World War II, which lasted until late 1944, when the Allies began their drive across Europe, forcing the Axis forces to withdraw. Xenakis joined the National Liberation Front early during the war, participating in mass protests and demonstrations, and later becoming part of armed resistance—this last step was a painful experience Xenakis refused to discuss until much later in life.

After the Axis forces left, Churchill ordered that British forces step in to help restore the Greek monarchy; they were opposed by the Democratic Army of Greece, and the country plunged into a civil war. In December 1944, during the period of Churchill's martial law, Xenakis (who was by then a member of the communist students' company of the left-wing Lord Byron faction of ELAS) became involved in street fighting against British tanks. He was wounded and facially disfigured when shrapnel from a tank blast hit his cheek and left eye, which was blinded; the fact that Xenakis survived the injury has been described as a miracle.

The Technical University operated intermittently during these years. Despite this, and Xenakis's other activities, he was able to graduate in 1947, with a degree in civil engineering.

Xenakis was then conscripted into the national armed forces. Around 1947 the Greek government began arresting former resistance members that were left-wing oriented and sending them to prison. Xenakis, fearing for his life, went into hiding. With the help of his father and others, he fled Greece through Italy by using a fake passport. On 11 November 1947 he arrived in Paris. In a late interview, Xenakis admitted to feeling tremendous guilt at leaving his country, and that guilt was one of the sources of his later devotion to music:

For years I was tormented by guilt at having left the country for which I'd fought. I left my friends—some were in prison, others were dead, some managed to escape. I felt I was in debt to them and that I had to repay that debt. And I felt I had a mission. I had to do something important to regain the right to live. It wasn't just a question of music—it was something much more significant.

In the meantime, in Greece he was sentenced in absentia to death by the right-wing administration. The sentence was commuted to ten years' imprisonment in 1951, and only lifted some 23 years later, after the fall of the Greek junta in 1974. He later returned the same year.

=== 1947–59: architecture and music ===
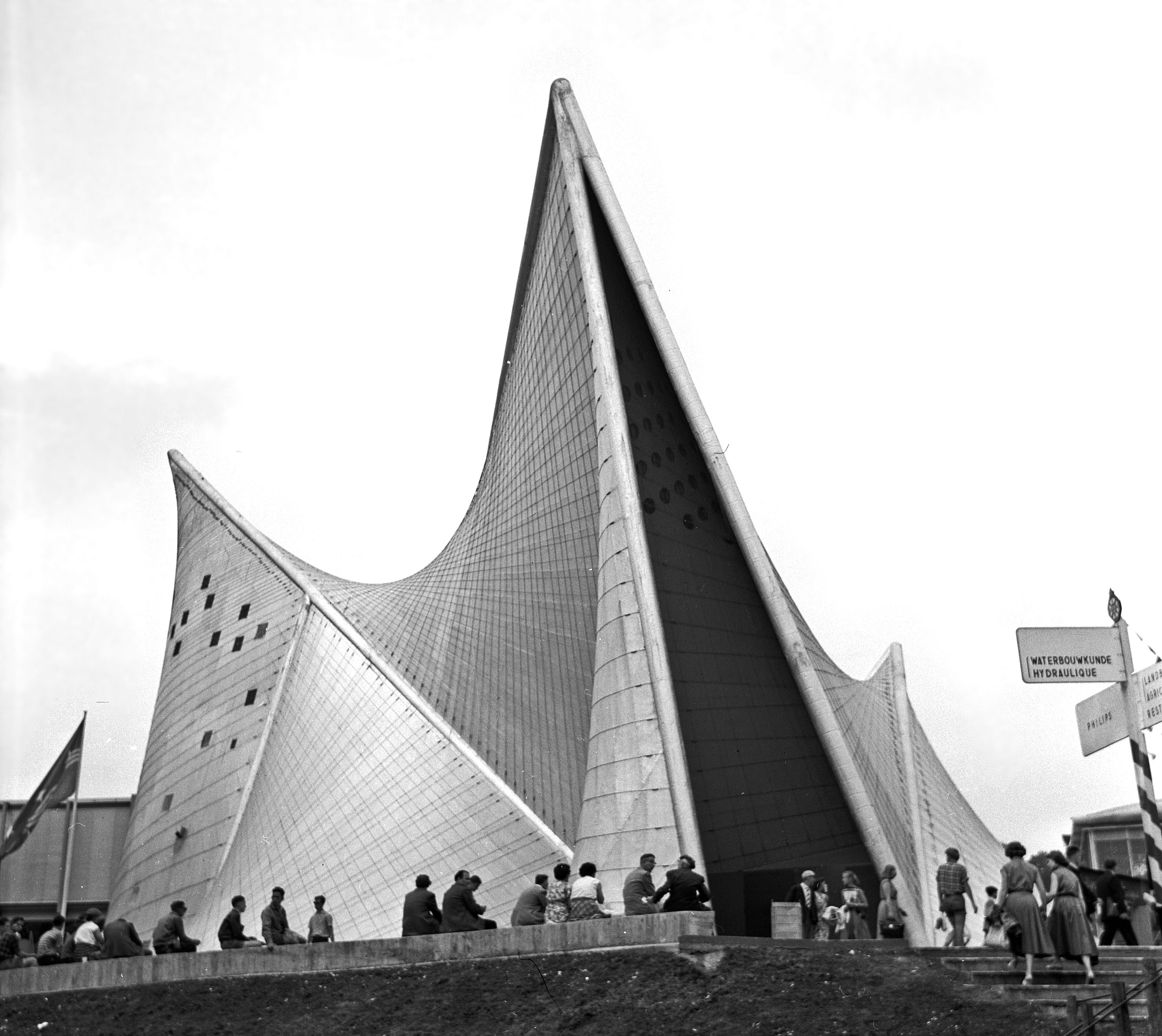
The Philips Pavilion, designed by Xenakis, during the 1958 Brussels World's Fair (Expo 58)

Although he was an illegal immigrant in Paris, Xenakis was able to get a job at Le Corbusier's architectural studio. He worked as an engineering assistant at first, but quickly rose to performing more important tasks, and eventually to collaborating with Le Corbusier on major projects. These included a kindergarten on the roof of an apartment block in Nantes (Rezé), the Unité d'Habitation of Nantes-Rezé, parts of government buildings in Chandigarh, India, the "undulatory glass surfaces" of Sainte Marie de La Tourette, a Dominican priory in a valley near Lyon, and the Philips Pavilion at Expo 58—the latter project was completed by Xenakis alone from a basic sketch by Le Corbusier. The experience Xenakis gained played a major role in his music: important early compositions such as Metastaseis (1953–54) were based directly on architectural concepts. At the same time, he dropped the "G" from his professional name to get the name he is most commonly known by, "Iannis".

At the same time, while working for Le Corbusier, Xenakis was studying harmony and counterpoint, and composing. He worked long and hard, frequently far into the night, and sought guidance from a number of teachers, most of whom, however, ultimately rejected him. Such was the case with Nadia Boulanger, who was the first person Xenakis approached about lessons. He then tried studying with Arthur Honegger, whose reaction to Xenakis's music was unenthusiastic. As Xenakis recounted in a 1987 interview, Honegger dismissed a piece which included parallel fifths and octaves as "not music". Xenakis, who was by that time well acquainted with music of Debussy, Béla Bartók, and Stravinsky, all of whom used such devices and much more experimental ones, was furious and left to study with Darius Milhaud, but these lessons also proved fruitless. Annette Dieudonné, a close friend of Boulanger's, then recommended that Xenakis try studying with Olivier Messiaen. Xenakis approached Messiaen for advice on whether he should once again start studying harmony and counterpoint. Messiaen later recalled:

I understood straight away that he was not someone like the others. [...] He is of superior intelligence. [...] I did something horrible which I should do with no other student, for I think one should study harmony and counterpoint. But this was a man so much out of the ordinary that I said... No, you are almost thirty, you have the good fortune of being Greek, of being an architect and having studied special mathematics. Take advantage of these things. Do them in your music.

Francisco Estévez has described this work as "mathematical formulas translated . . . into beautiful, exciting, and above all, convincing music."

Xenakis regularly attended Messiaen's classes from 1951 until 1953. Messiaen and his students studied music from a wide range of genres and styles, with particular attention to rhythm. Xenakis's compositions from 1949 until 1952 were mostly inspired by Greek folk melodies, as well as Bartók, Ravel, and others; after studying with Messiaen, he discovered serialism and gained a deep understanding of contemporary music (Messiaen's other pupils at the time included Karlheinz Stockhausen and Jean Barraqué, among others). Messiaen's modal serialism was an influence on Xenakis's first large-scale work, Anastenaria (1953–54): a triptych for choir and orchestra based on an ancient Dionysian ritual. The third part of the triptych, Metastaseis, is generally regarded as the composer's first mature piece; it was detached from the triptych to mark the beginning of the "official" Xenakis oeuvre. He was considered to be part of the Darmstadt School, but later broke with the group of composers, whom he believed focused too heavily on serialism and controlling all aspects of composition. In an article titled “The Crisis of Serial Music” he specifically accused Boulez and Stockhausen of steering music into a dead end.

On 3 December 1953, Xenakis married the journalist and writer Françoise Gargouïl (later known as Francoise Xenakis), whom he had met in 1950. Their daughter Mâkhi, who later became a painter and sculptor, was born in 1956 in Paris. In late 1954, with Messiaen's support, Xenakis was accepted into the Groupe de Recherches de Musique Concrète; an organization established by Pierre Schaeffer and Pierre Henry, dedicated to studying and producing electronic music of the musique concrète variety. Shortly after that Xenakis met conductor Hermann Scherchen, who was immediately impressed by the score of Metastaseis and offered his support. Although Scherchen did not premiere that particular work, he did give performances of later pieces by Xenakis, and the relationship between the conductor and the composer was of vital importance for the latter.

By the late 1950s Xenakis slowly started gaining recognition in artistic circles. In 1957, he received his first composition award, from the European Cultural Foundation, and in 1958 the first official commission came through, from Service de Recherche of Radio France. In the same year, he produced a musique concrète piece, Concret PH, for the Philips Pavilion. In 1960, Xenakis was well known enough to receive a commission from UNESCO for a soundtrack for a documentary film by Enrico Fulchignoni.

=== Later life ===
After leaving Le Corbusier's studio in 1959, Xenakis supported himself by composition and teaching, and quickly became recognized as one of the most important European composers of his time. In 1965, he became a French citizen. He became especially known for his musical research in the field of computer-assisted composition, for which he founded the Equipe de Mathématique et Automatique Musicales (EMAMu) in 1966 (known as CEMAMu: Centre d’Etudes de Mathématique et Automatique Musicales, since 1972). He taught at Indiana University School of Music from 1967 until 1972 (and established a studio similar to EMAMu there), and worked as visiting professor at the Sorbonne from 1973 until 1989.

Xenakis frequently lectured (for instance, from 1975 to 1978 he was Professor of Music at Gresham College, London, giving free public lectures), and teaching composition. His works were performed at numerous festivals worldwide, including the Shiraz Arts Festival in Iran. His notable students include Pascal Dusapin, Henning Lohner, Miguel Ángel Coria, Susan Frykberg, Norma Tyer, Robert Carl, and Julio Estrada. In 1983, he was elected as a member of the Académie Française.

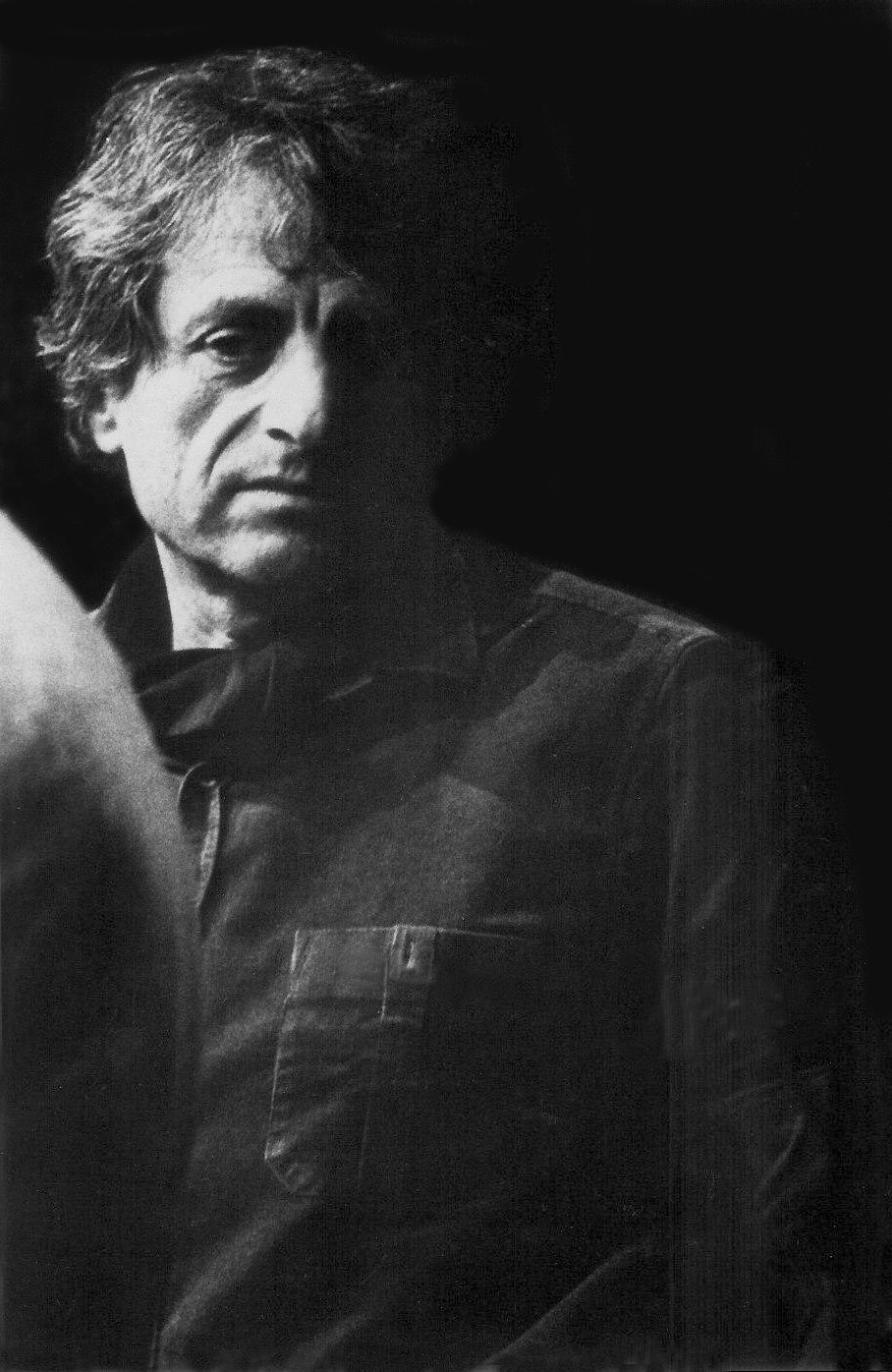
Xenakis (1975)

In addition to composing and teaching, Xenakis also wrote a number of articles and essays on music. Of these, Formalized Music (1963) became particularly known and was later expanded into a full book. A collection of texts on applications of stochastic processes, game theory and computer programming in music, it was later revised, expanded and translated into English as Formalized Music: Thought and Mathematics in Composition (1971) during Xenakis's tenure at Indiana University.

Xenakis was an atheist. Polish musicologist Zbigniew Skowron, describing Aïs, wrote "In accordance with his atheist views, Xenakis emphasizes the finality of death as the ultimate event of human life, and this is probably why wild shrieks and moans punctuate his score". Xenakis himself wrote, "Man is one, indivisible, and total. He thinks with his belly and feels with his mind. I would like to propose what, to my mind, covers the term "music": ... 7. It is a mystical (but atheistic) asceticism ...".

Xenakis completed his last work, O-mega for percussion soloist and chamber orchestra, in 1997. His health had been getting progressively worse over the years, and by 1997 he was no longer able to work. In 1999, Xenakis was awarded the Polar Music Prize "for a long succession of forceful works, charged with sensitivity, commitment and passion, through which he has come to rank among the most central composers of our century in the realm of art music, exercising within its various fields an influence which cannot be readily overstated".

After several years of serious illness, on 1 February 2001 the composer lapsed into a coma. He died in his Paris home four days later, on 4 February, aged 78; and was shortly after cremated, with his ashes being given to his family. He was outlived by his wife, who died on 12 February 2018 in Courbevoie, and his daughter.

== Works ==
Specific examples of mathematics, statistics, and physics applied to music composition are the use of the statistical mechanics of gases in Pithoprakta, statistical distribution of points on a plane in Diamorphoses, minimal constraints in Achorripsis, the normal distribution in ST/10 and Atrées, Markov chains in Analogique, game theory in Duel, Stratégie, and Linaia-agon, group theory in Nomos Alpha (for Siegfried Palm), set theory in Herma and Eonta, and Brownian motion in N'Shima. Persephassa, commissioned by the Shiraz Arts Festival, was performed by Les Percussions de Strasbourg, receiving its world premiere in Persepolis in 1969. Subsequently, he was once again commissioned by the Shiraz Arts Festival and composed Persepolis for the occasion, a "polytope" composed specific to the historic site.

Although electroacoustic compositions represent only a small fraction of Xenakis's output, they are highly relevant to musical thinking in the late 20th century. Important works in this medium include Concret PH (1958), Analogique B (1958–59), Bohor (1962), La légende d'Eer (1977), Mycenae-Alpha (1978), Voyage absolu des Unari vers Andromède (1989), Gendy301 (1991), and S709 (1994).

By 1979, he had devised a computer system called UPIC, which could translate graphical images into musical results. "Xenakis had originally trained as an architect, so some of his drawings, which he called 'arborescences', resembled both organic forms and architectural structures." These drawings' various curves and lines that could be interpreted by UPIC as real time instructions for the sound synthesis process. The drawing is, thus, rendered into a composition. Mycenae-Alpha was the first of these pieces he created using UPIC as it was being perfected.

Xenakis also developed a stochastic synthesizer algorithm (used in GENDY), called dynamic stochastic synthesis, where a polygonal waveform's sectional borders' amplitudes and distance between borders may be generated using a form of random walk to create both aleatoric timbres and musical forms. Further material may be generated by then refeeding the original waveform back into the function or wave forms may be superimposed. Elastic barriers or mirrors are used to keep the randomly generated values within a given finite interval, so as to not exceed limits such as the audible pitch range, avoid complete chaos (white noise), and to create a balance between stability and instability (unity and variety).

Despite Xenakis's reputation as a "mathematical" composer, his works are known for their power and physicality. Alex Ross wrote that Xenakis "produced some of the rawest, wildest music in history—sounds that explode around the ears. Rarefied methods were employed to release primordial energies." Ben Watson expressed admiration for the "terrifying emotional impact of [Xenakis'] sonic objectivity", describing his music as possessing "truly majestic otherness. It is an alien shard, glimmering in the heart of the West."

Tom Service praised Xenakis' music for its "shattering visceral power" and "sheer, scintillating physicality", noting its "deep, primal rootedness in richer and older phenomena even than musical history: the physics and patterning of the natural world, of the stars, of gas molecules, and the proliferating possibilities of mathematical principles." Service described Xenakis as a composer "whose craggily, joyously elemental music turned collections of pitches and rhythms and instruments into a force of nature, releasing a power that previous composers had only suggested metaphorically but which he would realise with arguably greater clarity, ferocity, intensity than any musician, before or since," and suggested that his music is "expressive: not in a conventionally emotional way, perhaps, but it has an ecstatic, cathartic power. Xenakis's music – and its preternaturally brilliant performers – allows its listeners to witness seismic events close at hand, to be at the middle of a musical happening of cosmic intensity." Service concluded: "it took Xenakis for music to become nature. On holiday in Corsica, Xenakis would pilot his canoe into the teeth of the biggest storm he and his paddle could manage. When you're listening to his music, you also go out there into the eye of a musical storm that will invigorate, inspire, and awe. See you out there..."

== Writings ==
- Xenakis, Iannis. 2001. Formalized Music: Thought and Mathematics in Composition (Harmonologia Series No. 6). Hillsdale, New York: Pendragon Press. ISBN 1-57647-079-2

== Cited sources ==
- Di Scipio, Agostino (1998). "Compositional Models in Xenakis's Electroacoustic Music". Perspectives of New Music. 36 (2): 201–243. doi:10.2307/833529. JSTOR 833529.
- Gilbert, Martin (1966). Winston Churchill. Oxford University Press.
- Harley, James (2004). Xenakis: His Life in Music. London: Taylor & Francis. ISBN 0-415-97145-4.
- Hoffmann, Peter (2001). "Xenakis, Iannis". In Deane Root (ed.). Grove Music Online. Oxford University Press. doi:10.1093/gmo/9781561592630.article.30654. ISBN 978-1-56159-263-0.
- Hugill, Andrew (2008). The Digital Musician. New York: Routledge. ISBN 978-0-415-80660-2.
- Matossian, Nouritza (1986). Xenakis. London: Kahn and Averill. ISBN 1-871082-17-X.
- Serra, Marie-Hélène (Winter 1993). "Stochastic Composition and Stochastic Timbre: GENDY3 by Iannis Xenakis". Perspectives of New Music. 32 (1): 236–257. doi:10.2307/833052. JSTOR 833052.
- Varga, Bálint András (1996). Conversations with Iannis Xenakis. London: Faber and Faber. ISBN 0-571-17959-2.
