= Communauté de communes Bourganeuf et Royère-de-Vassivière =

Coordinates: 45.9531°N 1.7557°E

Bourganeuf et Royère-de-Vassivière
- Former communauté de communes
- Interactive map of Bourganeuf et Royère-de-Vassivière
- Country: France
- Region: Nouvelle-Aquitaine
- Department: Creuse
- No. of communes: {{{nbcomm}}}
- Established: 2000
- Disbanded: 2017
- Area: 525.03 km^{2} (202.72 sq mi)
- Population (1999): 8,789
  - Density: 16.74/km^{2} (43.36/sq mi)

The communauté de communes Bourganeuf et Royère-de-Vassivière is in the Creuse département of the Limousin region of central France. It was created in January 2000. It was merged into the new Communauté de communes Creuse Sud Ouest in January 2017.

== Participants ==
The communauté comprised the following 20 communes:

- Auriat
- Bosmoreau-les-Mines
- Bourganeuf
- Faux-Mazuras
- Le Monteil-au-Vicomte
- Mansat-la-Courrière
- Masbaraud-Mérignat
- Montboucher
- Royère-de-Vassivière
- Saint-Amand-Jartoudeix
- Saint-Dizier-Leyrenne
- Saint-Martin-Château
- Saint-Martin-Sainte-Catherine
- Saint-Moreil
- Saint-Junien-la-Bregère
- Saint-Pardoux-Morterolles
- Saint-Pierre-Bellevue
- Saint-Pierre-Chérignat
- Saint-Priest-Palus
- Soubrebost

== Policies and objectives ==
The policy and objectives of the communauté are economic development, improvement of habitat, preservation of natural heritage and enhancement of cultural heritage, maintaining and welcoming a changing population and economic activities.
The communauté plans to restore the sites of the ‘’Martinèche’’, at Soubrebost, where Martin Nadaud was born and died. It is proposed to create a memorial space and visitors’ centre based on the life of Martin Nadaud. To this effect, a public subscription has been proposed.
To protect the site from any other development, the communauté purchased in 2007, nearly 18 hectares (44 acres) of the Mazure marshes located between Royère and Saint-Pierre-Bellevue. Placed under a forestry regime, the marsh will be managed by the National Forestry Office.

== See also ==
- Communes of the Creuse department
