= Saint-Dizier-Masbaraud =

Commune in Nouvelle-Aquitaine, France

- Commune
- Location of Saint-Dizier-Masbaraud
- Location within France Location within Nouvelle-Aquitaine
- Coordinates: 46°01′49″N 1°42′46″E
- Country: France
- Region: Nouvelle-Aquitaine
- Department: Creuse
- Arrondissement: Guéret
- Canton: Bourganeuf
- Intercommunality: CC Creuse Sud Ouest
- Area^{1}: 67.02 km^{2} (25.88 sq mi)
- Highest elevation: 619 m (2,031 ft)
- Lowest elevation: 370 m (1,210 ft)
- Population (2023): 1,143
  - Density: 17.05/km^{2} (44.17/sq mi)
- Time zone: UTC+01:00 (CET)
  - Summer (DST): UTC+02:00 (CEST)
- INSEE/Postal code: 23189 /23400
- ^{1} French Land Register data, which excludes lakes, ponds, glaciers > 1 km^{2} (0.386 sq mi or 247 acres) and river estuaries.

Saint-Dizier-Masbaraud is a commune in the Creuse department in central France. It was established on 1 January 2019 by merger of the former communes of Saint-Dizier-Leyrenne (the seat) and Masbaraud-Mérignat.

== See also ==
- Communes of the Creuse department
