= Masbaraud-Mérignat =

Part of Saint-Dizier-Masbaraud in Nouvelle-Aquitaine, France

- Part of Saint-Dizier-Masbaraud
- Location of Masbaraud-Mérignat
- Location within France Location within Nouvelle-Aquitaine
- Coordinates: 45°58′35″N 1°44′47″E
- Country: France
- Region: Nouvelle-Aquitaine
- Department: Creuse
- Arrondissement: Guéret
- Canton: Bourganeuf
- Commune: Saint-Dizier-Masbaraud
- Area^{1}: 20.39 km^{2} (7.87 sq mi)
- Elevation: 415 m (1,362 ft)
- Highest elevation: 580 m (1,900 ft)
- Lowest elevation: 370 m (1,210 ft)
- Population (2023): 350
  - Density: 17/km^{2} (44/sq mi)
- Time zone: UTC+01:00 (CET)
  - Summer (DST): UTC+02:00 (CEST)
- Postal code: 23400
- ^{1} French Land Register data, which excludes lakes, ponds, glaciers > 1 km^{2} (0.386 sq mi or 247 acres) and river estuaries.

Masbaraud-Mérignat (Limousin: Lo Mas de Barèu e Mairinhac) is a former commune in the Creuse department in the Nouvelle-Aquitaine region in central France. On 1 January 2019, it was merged into the new commune Saint-Dizier-Masbaraud.

== Geography ==
A farming area comprising the village and several hamlets situated in the valley of the river Taurion, some 15 miles (24 km) south of Guéret at the junction of the D61 and the D912 roads.

== Sights ==
- Traces of the abbey of Mérignat, dating from the eleventh century.
- The chapel, dating from the twentieth century.

== Personalities ==
- Raymond Poulidor, French racing cyclist, was born here on the family farm in 1936.

== See also ==
- Communes of the Creuse department
