= Saint-Dizier-Leyrenne =

Part of Saint-Dizier-Masbaraud in Nouvelle-Aquitaine, France

- Part of Saint-Dizier-Masbaraud
- Location of Saint-Dizier-Leyrenne
- Location within France Location within Nouvelle-Aquitaine
- Coordinates: 46°01′49″N 1°42′46″E
- Country: France
- Region: Nouvelle-Aquitaine
- Department: Creuse
- Arrondissement: Guéret
- Canton: Bourganeuf
- Commune: Saint-Dizier-Masbaraud
- Area^{1}: 46.63 km^{2} (18.00 sq mi)
- Elevation: 440 m (1,440 ft)
- Highest elevation: 619 m (2,031 ft)
- Lowest elevation: 370 m (1,210 ft)
- Population (2023): 793
  - Density: 17.0/km^{2} (44.0/sq mi)
- Time zone: UTC+01:00 (CET)
  - Summer (DST): UTC+02:00 (CEST)
- Postal code: 23400
- ^{1} French Land Register data, which excludes lakes, ponds, glaciers > 1 km^{2} (0.386 sq mi or 247 acres) and river estuaries.

Saint-Dizier-Leyrenne (French pronunciation: [sɛ̃ dizje leʁɛn]) is a former commune in the Creuse department in central France. On 1 January 2019, it was merged into the new commune Saint-Dizier-Masbaraud.

== See also ==
- Communes of the Creuse department
