= Michael Riffaterre =

French literary critic and theorist

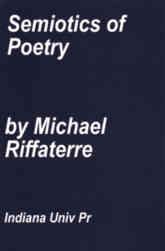

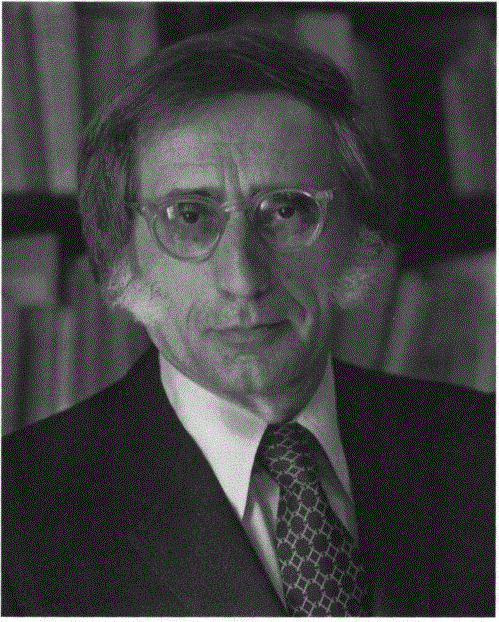
Michel Riffaterre

Michel Riffaterre (French pronunciation: [miʃɛl ʁifatɛʁ]; 20 November 1924 in Bourganeuf, Creuse – 27 May 2006 in New York), known as Michael Riffaterre, was an influential French literary critic and theorist. He pursued a generally structuralist approach. He is well known in particular for his book Semiotics of Poetry, and his conceptions of hypogram and syllepsis. Kornelije Kvas observes three phases in Riffaterre's work: stylistic, semiotic, and the intertextual phase. The most important is his intertextual phase in which he develops his understanding of intertextuality. For Riffaterre, "intertextuality is not a felicitous surplus, the privilege of a good memory or a classical education. The term indeed refers to an operation of the reader's mind, but it is an obligatory one, necessary to any textual decoding. Intertextuality necessarily complements our experience of textuality. It is the perception that our reading of the text cannot be complete or satisfactory without going through the intertext, that the text does not". According to the literary theorist Kornelije Kvas, "the key concept of Riffaterre's theory – intertextuality – is actually a method of text interpretation through which structures or poetic signs are recognized in the text that make the text literary. Intertextuality is a hermeneutic means of discovering the meaning of the poem, which strictly regulates the ways of the reader's perception of poetic signs. As in the case of the semiotic phase of his understanding of poetry, Riffaterre's intertextual phase is more like a theory of the interpretation of poetry than a theory of poetry itself".

== Biography ==
He was born in Bourganeuf, in the Limousin region of France. After receiving the concours général prize in French literature he went on to study at the University of Lyon. At some point during WWII, he fought in the French Resistance. After World War II he entered the Sorbonne, where he earned his M.A. in classics in 1947, and then became a doctoral student at Columbia University, earning his Ph.D. there in 1955, and remained for his entire academic career. He served as the chairman of the Department of French from 1974-1983. In 1982 he became a University Professor, the highest professorial rank at Columbia. He retired in 2004 and died in his home in New York City in 2006.

== Scientific career ==
Riffaterre was a Guggenheim Fellow twice, a fellow at Oxford, a member of the American Academy of Arts and Sciences, an officer in the order of the palmes académiques, and held honorary degrees from the Université Blaise-Pascal as well as the Sorbonne. In addition to teaching at Columbia he held visiting professorships at Johns Hopkins, the Collège de France, Yale, Harvard, the City University of New York, and the University of Pennsylvania, and led seminars at the School of Criticism and Theory. He is a past president of the Semiotic Society of America (1986).

== Influence ==
Riffaterre’s theoretical work has been adopted and adapted in other research fields outside literary theory. For example, Christensen (2016) introduces some of Riffaterre’s concepts to the analysis of work practice at a hospital.

== Works ==
- Le Style des Pleiades de Gobineau: Essai d'application d'une methode stylistique (1957); doctoral dissertation
- Essais de stylistique structurale (1971); translated by Daniel Delas
- Semiotics of Poetry (1978)
- La Production du texte (1979) 1983 English translation Text Production
- Fictional Truth (1990)
