= Mansat-la-Courrière =

Commune in Nouvelle-Aquitaine, France

- Commune
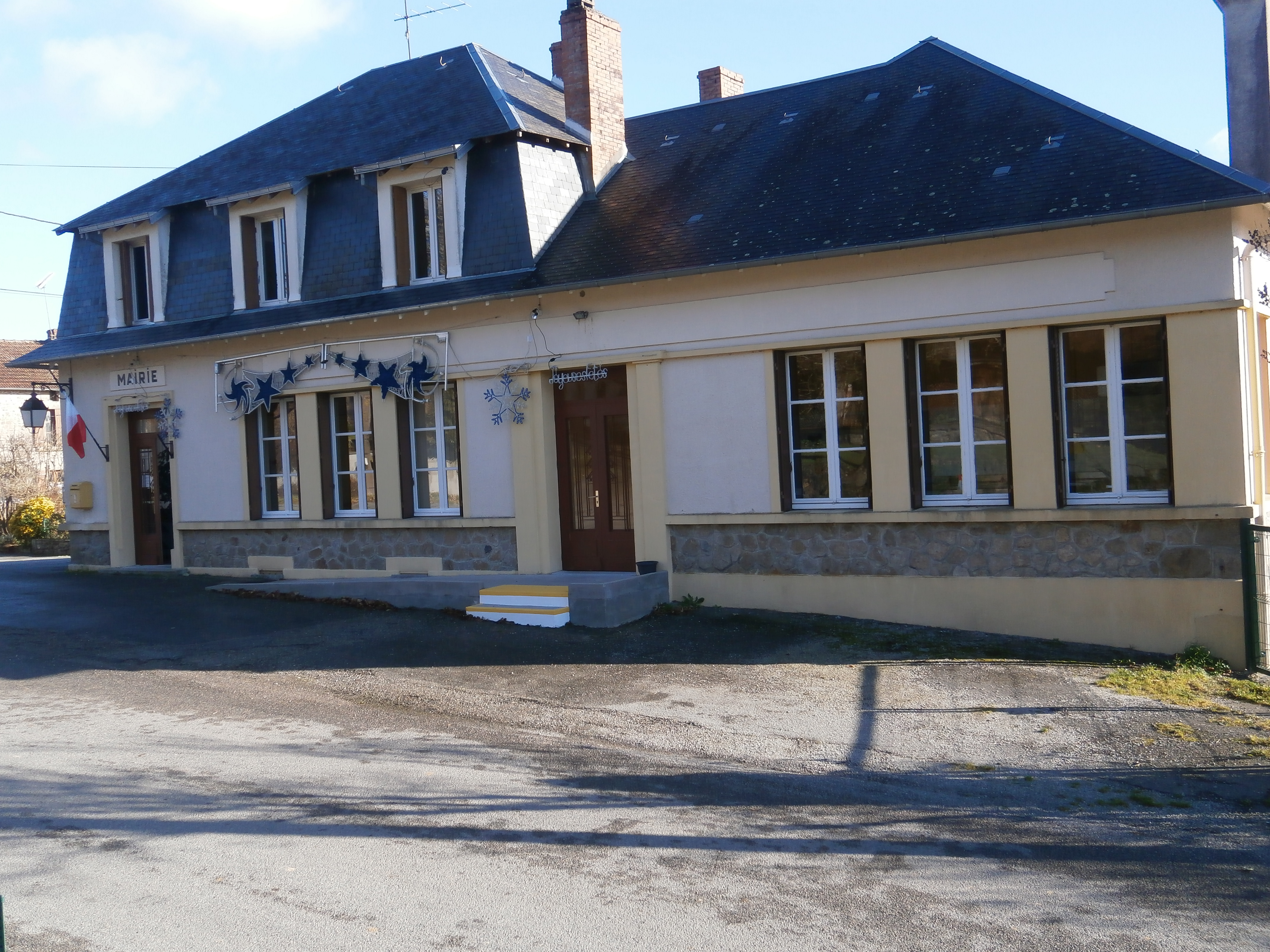
- Town hall
- Location of Mansat-la-Courrière
- Location within France Location within Nouvelle-Aquitaine
- Coordinates: 45°57′47″N 1°48′26″E
- Country: France
- Region: Nouvelle-Aquitaine
- Department: Creuse
- Arrondissement: Guéret
- Canton: Bourganeuf
- Intercommunality: CC Creuse Sud Ouest

Government
  - Mayor (2020–2026): Jean-Pierre Dugay
- Area^{1}: 9.42 km^{2} (3.64 sq mi)
- Highest elevation: 618 m (2,028 ft)
- Lowest elevation: 391 m (1,283 ft)
- Population (2023): 73
  - Density: 7.7/km^{2} (20/sq mi)
- Time zone: UTC+01:00 (CET)
  - Summer (DST): UTC+02:00 (CEST)
- INSEE/Postal code: 23122 /23400
- ^{1} French Land Register data, which excludes lakes, ponds, glaciers > 1 km^{2} (0.386 sq mi or 247 acres) and river estuaries.

Mansat-la-Courrière (French pronunciation: [mɑ̃sa la kuʁjɛʁ]; Occitan: Mançac la Corriéra) is a commune in the Creuse department in the Nouvelle-Aquitaine region in central France.

== Geography ==
A small farming area comprising the village and several hamlets situated in three small valleys, some 16 miles (26 km) south of Guéret at the junction of the D36, D941 and the D940 roads.

== Population ==
Historical population
Year	Pop.	±% p.a.
1968	118	—
1975	112	−0.74%
1982	100	−1.61%
1990	100	+0.00%
1999	94	−0.69%
2007	88	−0.82%
2012	94	+1.33%
2017	83	−2.46%
2023	73	−2.12%
Source: INSEE

== Sights ==
- The church of St. Martial, dating from the twelfth century.
- The fifteenth-century castle.
- Traces of a Roman villa.
- A bronze statue of the Graeco-Roman god Apollo was unearthed here and is now in the Louvre museum.

== See also ==
- Communes of the Creuse department
