= Montboucher =

Commune in Nouvelle-Aquitaine, France

- Commune
- Coat of arms
- Location of Montboucher
- Location within France Location within Nouvelle-Aquitaine
- Coordinates: 45°57′15″N 1°40′55″E
- Country: France
- Region: Nouvelle-Aquitaine
- Department: Creuse
- Arrondissement: Guéret
- Canton: Bourganeuf
- Intercommunality: CC Creuse Sud Ouest

Government
  - Mayor (2021–2026): Marc Ferrand
- Area^{1}: 27.68 km^{2} (10.69 sq mi)
- Elevation: 516 m (1,693 ft)
- Highest elevation: 627 m (2,057 ft)
- Lowest elevation: 379 m (1,243 ft)
- Population (2023): 372
  - Density: 13.4/km^{2} (34.8/sq mi)
- Time zone: UTC+01:00 (CET)
  - Summer (DST): UTC+02:00 (CEST)
- INSEE/Postal code: 23133 /23400
- ^{1} French Land Register data, which excludes lakes, ponds, glaciers > 1 km^{2} (0.386 sq mi or 247 acres) and river estuaries.

Montboucher (French pronunciation: [mɔ̃buʃe]; Occitan: Montbochier) is a commune in the Creuse department in the Nouvelle-Aquitaine region in central France.

== Geography ==
An area of streams, lakes and farming comprising the village and several hamlets situated some 18 miles (29 km) southwest of Guéret at the junction of the D36, D44 and the D941 roads. The commune is on the border with the departement of Haute-Vienne.

== Population ==
Historical population
Year	Pop.	±% p.a.
1968	484	—
1975	428	−1.74%
1982	377	−1.80%
1990	356	−0.71%
1999	344	−0.38%
2007	365	+0.74%
2012	356	−0.50%
2017	349	−0.40%
2023	372	+1.07%
Source: INSEE

== Sights ==
- The neo-Gothic church, dating from the nineteenth century.
- The nineteenth-century Château de Vedrenas .

== See also ==
- Communes of the Creuse department
