= Saint-Martin-Sainte-Catherine =

Commune in Nouvelle-Aquitaine, France

- Commune
- Location of Saint-Martin-Sainte-Catherine
- Location within France Location within Nouvelle-Aquitaine
- Coordinates: 45°56′58″N 1°33′58″E
- Country: France
- Region: Nouvelle-Aquitaine
- Department: Creuse
- Arrondissement: Guéret
- Canton: Bourganeuf
- Intercommunality: CC Creuse Sud Ouest

Government
  - Mayor (2020–2026): Jean-Michel Pamies
- Area^{1}: 27.27 km^{2} (10.53 sq mi)
- Elevation: 350 m (1,150 ft)
- Highest elevation: 483 m (1,585 ft)
- Lowest elevation: 271 m (889 ft)
- Population (2023): 330
  - Density: 12/km^{2} (31/sq mi)
- Time zone: UTC+01:00 (CET)
  - Summer (DST): UTC+02:00 (CEST)
- INSEE/Postal code: 23217 /23430
- ^{1} French Land Register data, which excludes lakes, ponds, glaciers > 1 km^{2} (0.386 sq mi or 247 acres) and river estuaries.

Saint-Martin-Sainte-Catherine (French pronunciation: [sɛ̃ maʁtɛ̃ sɛ̃t katʁin]; Limousin: Sent Martin Senta Catarina) is a commune in the Creuse department in central France.

== Population ==
Historical population
Year	Pop.	±% p.a.
1968	627	—
1975	524	−2.53%
1982	483	−1.16%
1990	425	−1.59%
1999	370	−1.53%
2007	356	−0.48%
2012	313	−2.54%
2017	343	+1.85%
2023	330	−0.64%
Source: INSEE

== See also ==
- Communes of the Creuse department
