= Saint-Junien-la-Bregère =

Commune in Nouvelle-Aquitaine, France

- Commune
- Location of Saint-Junien-la-Bregère
- Location within France Location within Nouvelle-Aquitaine
- Coordinates: 45°53′05″N 1°45′22″E
- Country: France
- Region: Nouvelle-Aquitaine
- Department: Creuse
- Arrondissement: Guéret
- Canton: Bourganeuf
- Intercommunality: CC Creuse Sud Ouest

Government
  - Mayor (2020–2026): Alain Calomine
- Area^{1}: 25.66 km^{2} (9.91 sq mi)
- Elevation: 520 m (1,710 ft)
- Highest elevation: 691 m (2,267 ft)
- Lowest elevation: 464 m (1,522 ft)
- Population (2023): 144
  - Density: 5.61/km^{2} (14.5/sq mi)
- Time zone: UTC+01:00 (CET)
  - Summer (DST): UTC+02:00 (CEST)
- INSEE/Postal code: 23205 /23400
- ^{1} French Land Register data, which excludes lakes, ponds, glaciers > 1 km^{2} (0.386 sq mi or 247 acres) and river estuaries.

Saint-Junien-la-Bregère (French pronunciation: [sɛ̃ ʒynjɛ̃ la bʁəʒɛʁ]; Occitan: Sent Ginhan lo Bregèra) is a commune in the Creuse department in central France.

The only commercial operations are forestry, farming and a small campsite. The name of the commune is a corruption of Saint Junien les Bruyères (heath).

== Population ==
Historical population
Year	Pop.	±% p.a.
1968	340	—
1975	272	−3.14%
1982	223	−2.80%
1990	193	−1.79%
1999	160	−2.06%
2007	157	−0.24%
2012	140	−2.27%
2017	140	+0.00%
2023	144	+0.47%
Source: INSEE

== See also ==
- Communes of the Creuse department
