= Saint-Pierre-Chérignat =

Commune in Nouvelle-Aquitaine, France

- Commune
- Location of Saint-Pierre-Chérignat
- Location within France Location within Nouvelle-Aquitaine
- Coordinates: 45°58′25″N 1°36′54″E
- Country: France
- Region: Nouvelle-Aquitaine
- Department: Creuse
- Arrondissement: Guéret
- Canton: Bourganeuf
- Intercommunality: CC Creuse Sud Ouest

Government
  - Mayor (2020–2026): Sylvain Gaudy
- Area^{1}: 23.72 km^{2} (9.16 sq mi)
- Elevation: 421 m (1,381 ft)
- Highest elevation: 497 m (1,631 ft)
- Lowest elevation: 292 m (958 ft)
- Population (2023): 164
  - Density: 6.91/km^{2} (17.9/sq mi)
- Time zone: UTC+01:00 (CET)
  - Summer (DST): UTC+02:00 (CEST)
- INSEE/Postal code: 23230 /23430
- ^{1} French Land Register data, which excludes lakes, ponds, glaciers > 1 km^{2} (0.386 sq mi or 247 acres) and river estuaries.

Saint-Pierre-Chérignat (French pronunciation: [sɛ̃ pjɛʁ ʃeʁiɲa]; Limousin: Sent Peir Charnhac) is a commune in the Creuse department in central France.

== Population ==
Historical population
Year	Pop.	±% p.a.
1968	305	—
1975	257	−2.42%
1982	219	−2.26%
1990	218	−0.06%
1999	186	−1.75%
2007	160	−1.86%
2012	190	+3.50%
2017	168	−2.43%
2023	164	−0.40%
Source: INSEE

== See also ==
- Communes of the Creuse department
