= Saint-Amand-Jartoudeix =

Commune in Nouvelle-Aquitaine, France

- Commune
- Location of Saint-Amand-Jartoudeix
- Location within France Location within Nouvelle-Aquitaine
- Coordinates: 45°54′54″N 1°39′34″E
- Country: France
- Region: Nouvelle-Aquitaine
- Department: Creuse
- Arrondissement: Guéret
- Canton: Bourganeuf
- Intercommunality: CC Creuse Sud Ouest

Government
  - Mayor (2020–2026): Jean-Pierre Parot
- Area^{1}: 18.74 km^{2} (7.24 sq mi)
- Elevation: 436 m (1,430 ft)
- Highest elevation: 605 m (1,985 ft)
- Lowest elevation: 399 m (1,309 ft)
- Population (2023): 150
  - Density: 8.0/km^{2} (21/sq mi)
- Time zone: UTC+01:00 (CET)
  - Summer (DST): UTC+02:00 (CEST)
- INSEE/Postal code: 23181 /23400
- ^{1} French Land Register data, which excludes lakes, ponds, glaciers > 1 km^{2} (0.386 sq mi or 247 acres) and river estuaries.

Saint-Amand-Jartoudeix (French pronunciation: [sɛ̃.t‿amɑ̃ ʒaʁtudɛ]; Limousin: Sent Amand Jartodés) is a commune in the Creuse department in central France.

== Population ==
Historical population
Year	Pop.	±% p.a.
1968	310	—
1975	277	−1.60%
1982	240	−2.03%
1990	236	−0.21%
1999	189	−2.44%
2007	174	−1.03%
2012	172	−0.23%
2017	168	−0.47%
2023	150	−1.87%
Source: INSEE

== See also ==
- Communes of the Creuse department
