= Saint-Pierre-Bellevue =

Commune in Nouvelle-Aquitaine, France

- Commune
- Location of Saint-Pierre-Bellevue
- Location within France Location within Nouvelle-Aquitaine
- Coordinates: 45°55′01″N 1°53′21″E
- Country: France
- Region: Nouvelle-Aquitaine
- Department: Creuse
- Arrondissement: Guéret
- Canton: Bourganeuf
- Intercommunality: CC Creuse Sud Ouest

Government
  - Mayor (2020–2026): Pierre-Marie Nourrisseau
- Area^{1}: 32.78 km^{2} (12.66 sq mi)
- Elevation: 650 m (2,130 ft)
- Highest elevation: 808 m (2,651 ft)
- Lowest elevation: 512 m (1,680 ft)
- Population (2023): 215
  - Density: 6.56/km^{2} (17.0/sq mi)
- Time zone: UTC+01:00 (CET)
  - Summer (DST): UTC+02:00 (CEST)
- INSEE/Postal code: 23232 /23460
- ^{1} French Land Register data, which excludes lakes, ponds, glaciers > 1 km^{2} (0.386 sq mi or 247 acres) and river estuaries.

Saint-Pierre-Bellevue (French pronunciation: [sɛ̃ pjɛʁ bɛlvy]; Limousin: Sent Peir) is a commune in the Creuse department in central France.

== Population ==
Historical population
Year	Pop.	±% p.a.
1968	347	—
1975	325	−0.93%
1982	330	+0.22%
1990	302	−1.10%
1999	239	−2.57%
2007	235	−0.21%
2012	221	−1.22%
2017	210	−1.02%
2023	215	+0.39%
Source: INSEE

== See also ==
- Communes of the Creuse department
