= Soubrebost =

Commune in Nouvelle-Aquitaine, France

- Commune
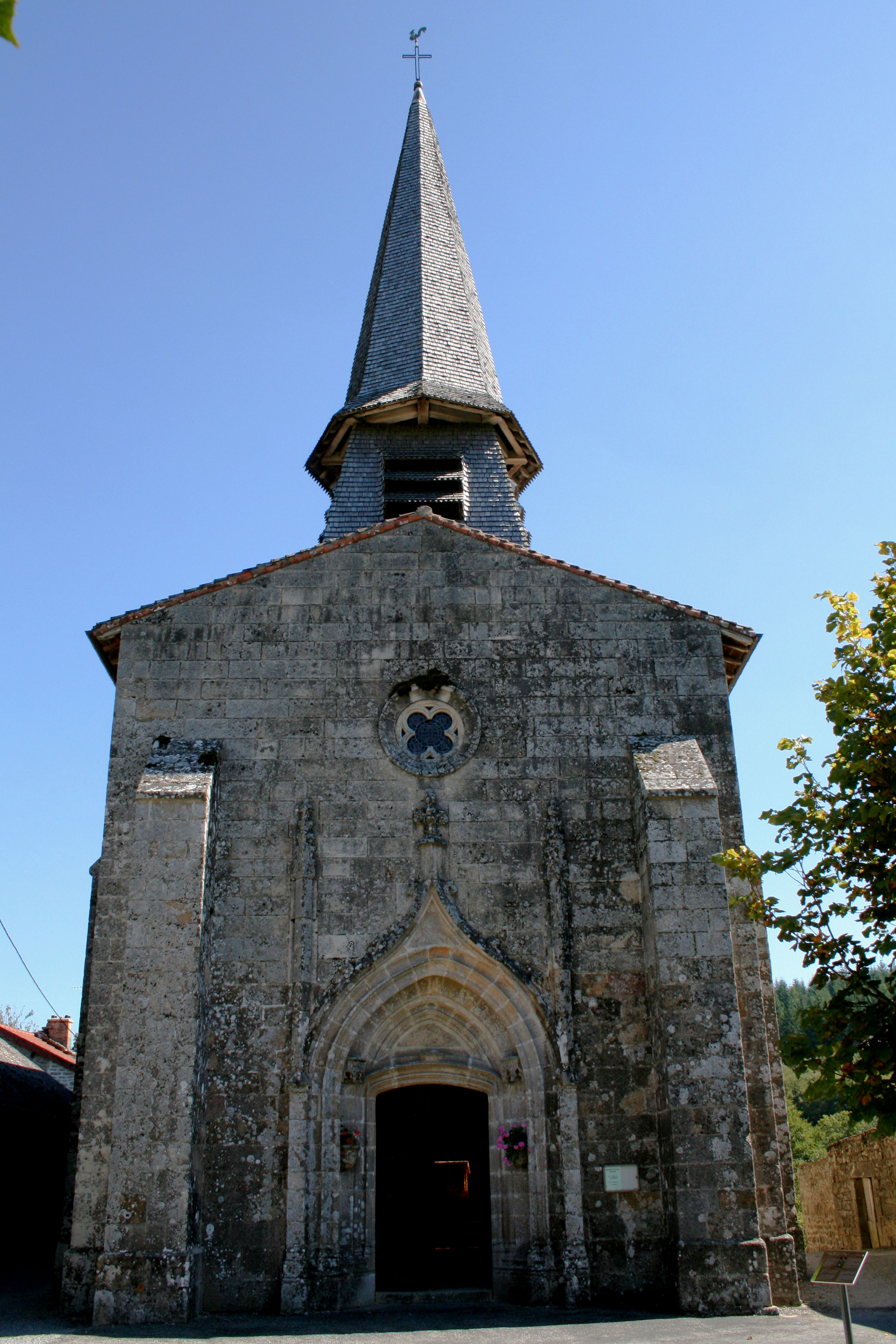
- The church in Soubrebost
- Location of Soubrebost
- Location within France Location within Nouvelle-Aquitaine
- Coordinates: 45°57′30″N 1°50′38″E
- Country: France
- Region: Nouvelle-Aquitaine
- Department: Creuse
- Arrondissement: Guéret
- Canton: Bourganeuf
- Intercommunality: CC Creuse Sud Ouest

Government
  - Mayor (2020–2026): Annick Pataud
- Area^{1}: 20.76 km^{2} (8.02 sq mi)
- Highest elevation: 721 m (2,365 ft)
- Lowest elevation: 445 m (1,460 ft)
- Population (2023): 139
  - Density: 6.70/km^{2} (17.3/sq mi)
- Time zone: UTC+01:00 (CET)
  - Summer (DST): UTC+02:00 (CEST)
- INSEE/Postal code: 23173 /23250
- ^{1} French Land Register data, which excludes lakes, ponds, glaciers > 1 km^{2} (0.386 sq mi or 247 acres) and river estuaries.

Soubrebost is a commune in the Creuse department in the Nouvelle-Aquitaine region in central France.

== Geography ==
An area of lakes, forestry and farming, comprising the village and several hamlets situated in the valley of the Thaurion river some 15 miles (24 km) south of Guéret, at the junction of the D13, D36 and the D37 roads.

== Population ==
Historical population
Year	Pop.	±% p.a.
1968	193	—
1975	156	−2.99%
1982	142	−1.33%
1990	135	−0.63%
1999	139	+0.32%
2007	151	+1.04%
2012	121	−4.33%
2017	136	+2.36%
2023	139	+0.36%
Source: INSEE

== Personalities ==
- Martin Nadaud, politician, was born 17 November 1815 in the hamlet of La Martinèche and died there on 28 December 1898.

== Sights ==
- The church, dating from the thirteenth century, which houses a wooden statue of the same period.

== See also ==
- Communes of the Creuse department
