= Faux-Mazuras =

Commune in Nouvelle-Aquitaine, France

- Commune
- Location of Faux-Mazuras
- Location within France Location within Nouvelle-Aquitaine
- Coordinates: 45°55′28″N 1°47′03″E
- Country: France
- Region: Nouvelle-Aquitaine
- Department: Creuse
- Arrondissement: Guéret
- Canton: Bourganeuf
- Intercommunality: CC Creuse Sud Ouest

Government
  - Mayor (2020–2026): Jean-Bernard Legros
- Area^{1}: 19.96 km^{2} (7.71 sq mi)
- Elevation: 450 m (1,480 ft)
- Highest elevation: 642 m (2,106 ft)
- Lowest elevation: 454 m (1,490 ft)
- Population (2023): 186
  - Density: 9.32/km^{2} (24.1/sq mi)
- Time zone: UTC+01:00 (CET)
  - Summer (DST): UTC+02:00 (CEST)
- INSEE/Postal code: 23078 /23400
- ^{1} French Land Register data, which excludes lakes, ponds, glaciers > 1 km^{2} (0.386 sq mi or 247 acres) and river estuaries.

Faux-Mazuras (Occitan: Fals Mazuras) is a commune in the Creuse department in the Nouvelle-Aquitaine region in central France.

== Geography ==
A small farming village situated some 19 miles (31 km) south of Guéret at the junction of the D8, D36 and the D37 roads. Coal was mined here for around 100 years until the mid-20th century.

== Population ==
Historical population
Year	Pop.	±% p.a.
1968	216	—
1975	182	−2.42%
1982	179	−0.24%
1990	169	−0.72%
1999	160	−0.61%
2007	167	+0.54%
2012	173	+0.71%
2017	182	+1.02%
2023	186	+0.36%
Source: INSEE

== Sights ==
- The abandoned church at Faux, dating from the fifteenth century.
- Two sixteenth-century stone crosses.
- The sixteenth-century chapel at Mazuras.

== See also ==
- Communes of the Creuse department
