= Bosmoreau-les-Mines =

Commune in Nouvelle-Aquitaine, France

- Commune
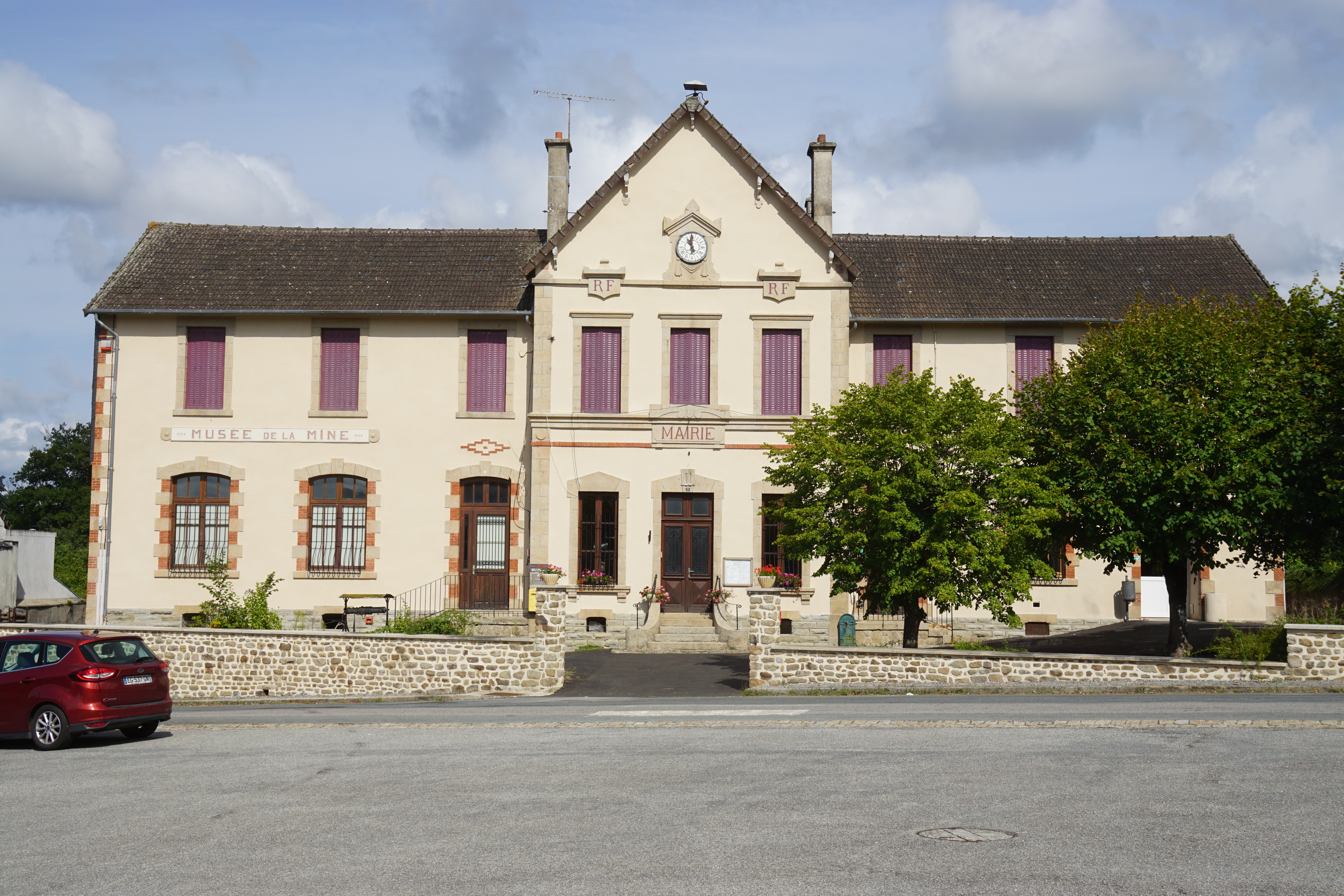
- Town hall
- Location of Bosmoreau-les-Mines
- Location within France Location within Nouvelle-Aquitaine
- Coordinates: 46°00′06″N 1°45′23″E
- Country: France
- Region: Nouvelle-Aquitaine
- Department: Creuse
- Arrondissement: Guéret
- Canton: Bourganeuf
- Intercommunality: CC Creuse Sud Ouest

Government
  - Mayor (2020–2026): Daniel Boueyre
- Area^{1}: 9.01 km^{2} (3.48 sq mi)
- Elevation: 430 m (1,410 ft)
- Highest elevation: 515 m (1,690 ft)
- Lowest elevation: 390 m (1,280 ft)
- Population (2023): 230
  - Density: 26/km^{2} (66/sq mi)
- Time zone: UTC+01:00 (CET)
  - Summer (DST): UTC+02:00 (CEST)
- INSEE/Postal code: 23027 /23400
- ^{1} French Land Register data, which excludes lakes, ponds, glaciers > 1 km^{2} (0.386 sq mi or 247 acres) and river estuaries.

Bosmoreau-les-Mines is a commune in the Creuse department in the Nouvelle-Aquitaine region in central France.

== Geography ==
An area of forestry and farming comprising the village and several hamlets situated by the banks of the Taurion river, some 15 miles (24 km) southwest of Guéret, at the junction of the D61 and the D60 roads.

== Population ==
Historical population
Year	Pop.	±% p.a.
1968	444	—
1975	377	−2.31%
1982	301	−3.17%
1990	249	−2.34%
1999	272	+0.99%
2007	248	−1.15%
2012	251	+0.24%
2017	244	−0.56%
2023	230	−0.98%
Source: INSEE

== Sights ==
- The church, dating from the eighteenth century.
- A museum of coalmining.
- Buffalo Farm.
- Velo Rail.

== See also ==
- Communes of the Creuse department
