= Bourganeuf =

Commune in Nouvelle-Aquitaine, France

- Commune
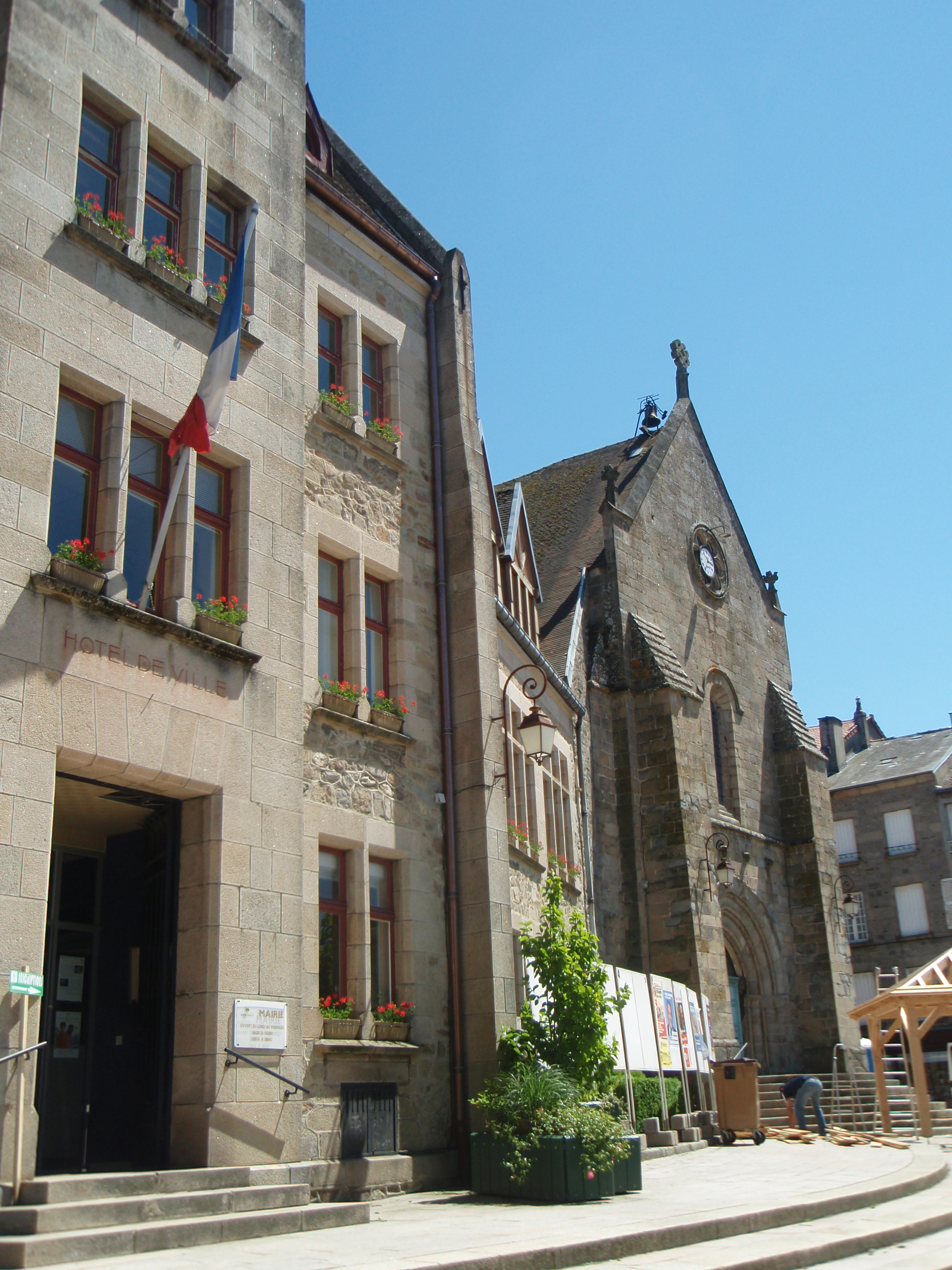
- Town hall

- Coat of arms
- Location of Bourganeuf
- Location within France Location within Nouvelle-Aquitaine
- Coordinates: 45°57′15″N 1°45′23″E
- Country: France
- Region: Nouvelle-Aquitaine
- Department: Creuse
- Arrondissement: Guéret
- Canton: Bourganeuf
- Intercommunality: CC Creuse Sud Ouest

Government
  - Mayor (2020–2026): Régis Rigaud
- Area^{1}: 22.54 km^{2} (8.70 sq mi)
- Elevation: 413 m (1,355 ft)
- Highest elevation: 602 m (1,975 ft)
- Lowest elevation: 380 m (1,250 ft)
- Population (2023): 2,364
  - Density: 104.9/km^{2} (271.6/sq mi)
- Time zone: UTC+01:00 (CET)
  - Summer (DST): UTC+02:00 (CEST)
- INSEE/Postal code: 23030 /23400
- ^{1} French Land Register data, which excludes lakes, ponds, glaciers > 1 km^{2} (0.386 sq mi or 247 acres) and river estuaries.

Bourganeuf (French pronunciation: [buʁɡanœf]; Limousin: Borgon Nuòu) is a commune in the Creuse department in the Nouvelle-Aquitaine region in central France.

== Geography ==
An area of farming and forestry, comprising the village and several hamlets situated in the valley of the Taurion river, some 21 miles (34 km) south of Guéret, at the junction of the D8, D912, D940 and the D941.

== History ==
The year 1103 saw the village become home to the Knights of St John, who built a castle here.
Prince Cem Sultan, a pretender to the throne of the Ottoman Empire, was kept prisoner here in the fifteenth century.

The town had a population of 2,451 in 1841.

In 1886, the commune was the third place in all of France to be supplied with hydroelectricity power. Thanks to French engineer, Marcel Deprez, the waterfalls of the river were harnessed to light up the streets, mairie, shops and cafes.

== Population ==
Historical population
Year	Pop.	±% p.a.
1968	3,804	—
1975	3,637	−0.64%
1982	3,738	+0.39%
1990	3,385	−1.23%
1999	3,163	−0.75%
2007	2,948	−0.88%
2012	2,781	−1.16%
2017	2,572	−1.55%
2023	2,364	−1.40%
Source: INSEE

== Sights ==
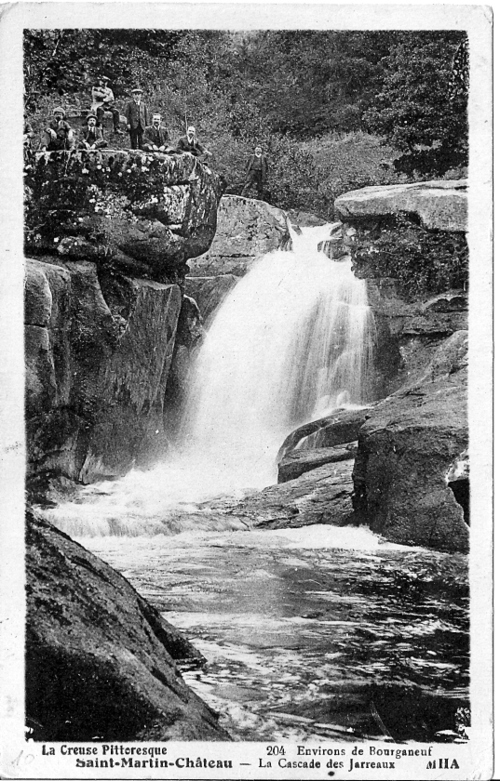
Jarrauds waterfall

- The church of St.Pierre, dating from the twelfth century.
- The church of St.Jean, dating from the fifteenth century.
- The remains of a 12th-century castle.
- Four chapels.
- A museum of electricity.
- The archaeological museum in the Zizim(Cem) tower.
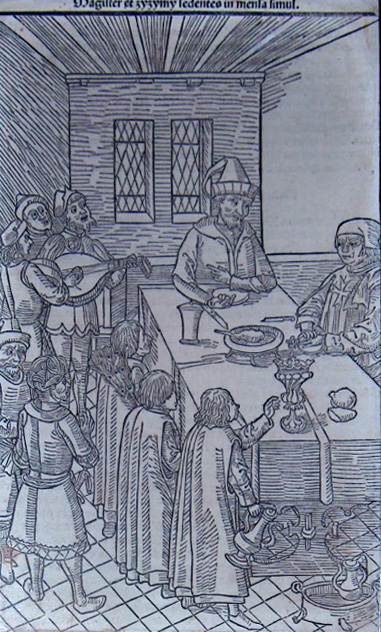
Engraving of Prince Cem

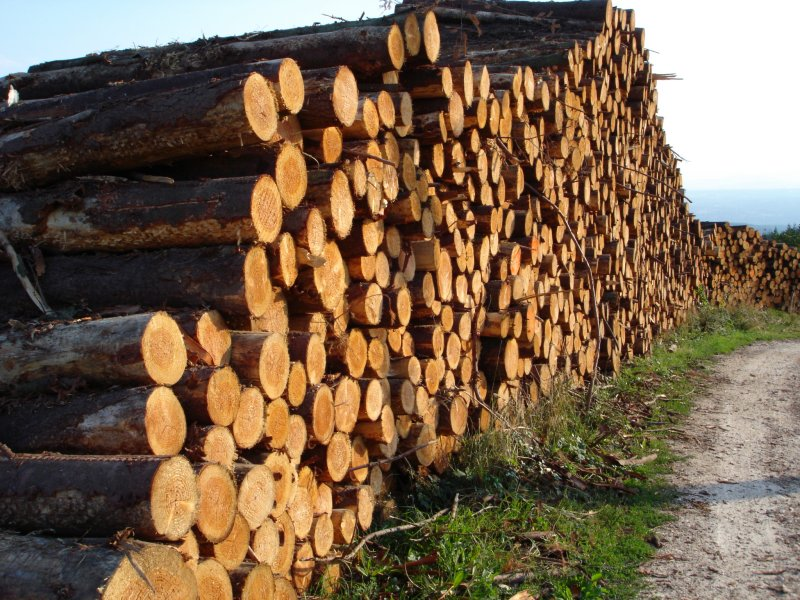
Timber production

== Personalities ==
- Thierry Ardisson, television producer and animator, was born here in 1949.
- Martin Nadaud, politician was born in the hamlet of La Martinèche in 1815.
- Michel Riffaterre, French literary critic and theorist born 1924.
- René Viviani, politician, was born here in 1863.
- Peter Watkins, British film director, died in Bourganeuf in 2025.

== International relations ==
Bourganeuf is twinned with: Zirndorf, Germany

== See also ==
- Communes of the Creuse department
