= Saint-Martin-Château =

Commune in Nouvelle-Aquitaine, France

- Commune
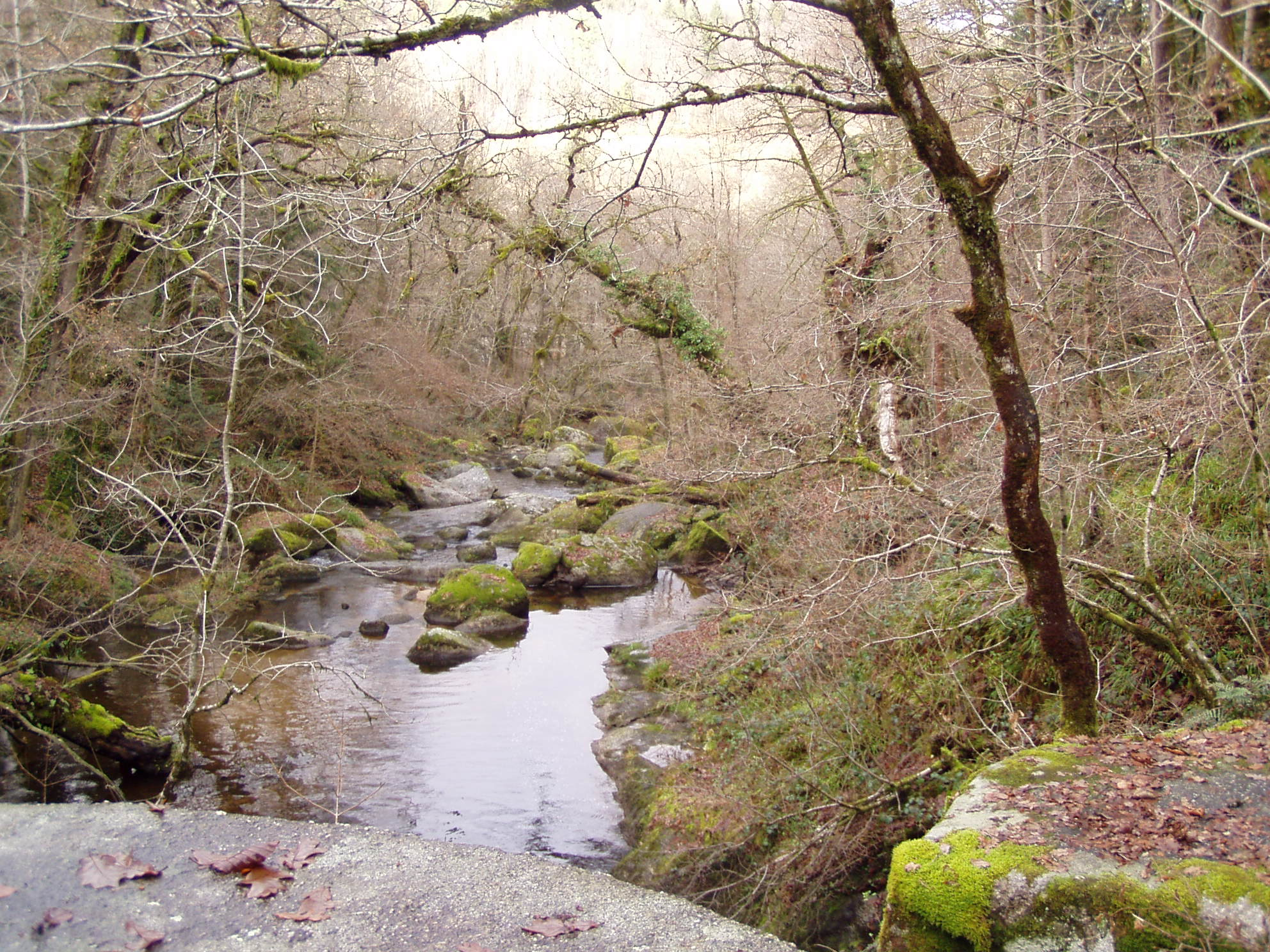
- The Maulde river, at the foot of the Jarrauds waterfall
- Location of Saint-Martin-Château
- Location within France Location within Nouvelle-Aquitaine
- Coordinates: 45°51′29″N 1°47′59″E
- Country: France
- Region: Nouvelle-Aquitaine
- Department: Creuse
- Arrondissement: Guéret
- Canton: Felletin
- Intercommunality: CC Creuse Sud Ouest

Government
  - Mayor (2020–2026): Nicolas Derieux
- Area^{1}: 31.25 km^{2} (12.07 sq mi)
- Elevation: 600 m (2,000 ft)
- Highest elevation: 741 m (2,431 ft)
- Lowest elevation: 410 m (1,350 ft)
- Population (2023): 150
  - Density: 4.8/km^{2} (12/sq mi)
- Time zone: UTC+01:00 (CET)
  - Summer (DST): UTC+02:00 (CEST)
- INSEE/Postal code: 23216 /23460
- ^{1} French Land Register data, which excludes lakes, ponds, glaciers > 1 km^{2} (0.386 sq mi or 247 acres) and river estuaries.

Saint-Martin-Château (Limousin: Sent Martin Chasteu) is a commune in the Creuse department in central France.

== Population ==
Historical population
Year	Pop.	±% p.a.
1968	323	—
1975	259	−3.11%
1982	219	−2.37%
1990	152	−4.46%
1999	135	−1.31%
2007	142	+0.63%
2012	153	+1.50%
2017	144	−1.21%
2023	150	+0.68%
Source: INSEE

== See also ==
- Communes of the Creuse department
