= Canton of Bourganeuf =

Coordinates: 45°58′17″N 1°45′06″E

Bourganeuf
- Canton
- Interactive map of Bourganeuf
- Country: France
- Region: Nouvelle-Aquitaine
- Department: Creuse
- No. of communes: {{{nbcomm}}}
- Area: 397.3 km^{2} (153.4 sq mi)
- Population (2023): 6,123
  - Density: 15.41/km^{2} (39.92/sq mi)
- INSEE code: 23 05

The Canton of Bourganeuf is a canton situated in the Creuse département and in the Nouvelle-Aquitaine region of central France.

== Geography ==
An area of farming and forestry in the arrondissement of Guéret, centred on the town of Bourganeuf. The altitude varies from 271m (Saint-Martin-Sainte-Catherine) to 721m (Soubrebost) with an average altitude of 452m.

== Population ==
Historical population
Year	Pop.	±% p.a.
2013	6,520	—
2018	6,215	−0.95%
Source: INSEE

== Composition ==
At the French canton reorganisation which came into effect in March 2015, the canton was expanded from 13 to 17 communes (2 of which were merged into the new commune Saint-Dizier-Masbaraud):

- Auriat
- Bosmoreau-les-Mines
- Bourganeuf
- Faux-Mazuras
- Mansat-la-Courrière
- Montboucher
- Saint-Amand-Jartoudeix
- Saint-Dizier-Masbaraud
- Saint-Junien-la-Bregère
- Saint-Martin-Sainte-Catherine
- Saint-Moreil
- Saint-Pardoux-Morterolles
- Saint-Pierre-Bellevue
- Saint-Pierre-Chérignat
- Saint-Priest-Palus
- Soubrebost

== See also ==
- Arrondissements of the Creuse department
- Cantons of the Creuse department
- Communes of the Creuse department
