= Martin Nadaud =

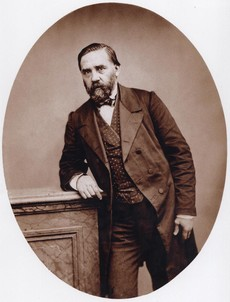
Martin Nadaud, he was once a member of the France Parliament.

Martin Nadaud (17 November 1815, Soubrebost, Creuse – 28 December 1898) rose from being a peasant boy to becoming a revolutionary and Member of Parliament. His first language was Langue d'oc and he learned French while working in Paris as a stonemason from the age of 14.

He avoided being drafted into the army for seven years service due to injuries from a fall on a Paris building site and local connections with a sympathetic doctor.He escaped to England after the French Revolution of 1848 and lived there for eighteen years, becoming a schoolmaster in Wimbledon under the assumed name of Henri Geo. Martin. He also was initiated as a freemason in that time.

As a member of the Parliament of France, he advocated better public transport and public services. A station of the Paris Métro was named after him (Martin Nadaud (Paris Métro)) but was absorbed by a renovated Gambetta station in 1969.
