= Creuse =

Department of France

Creuse Cruesa/Crosa (Occitan)
- Department of France
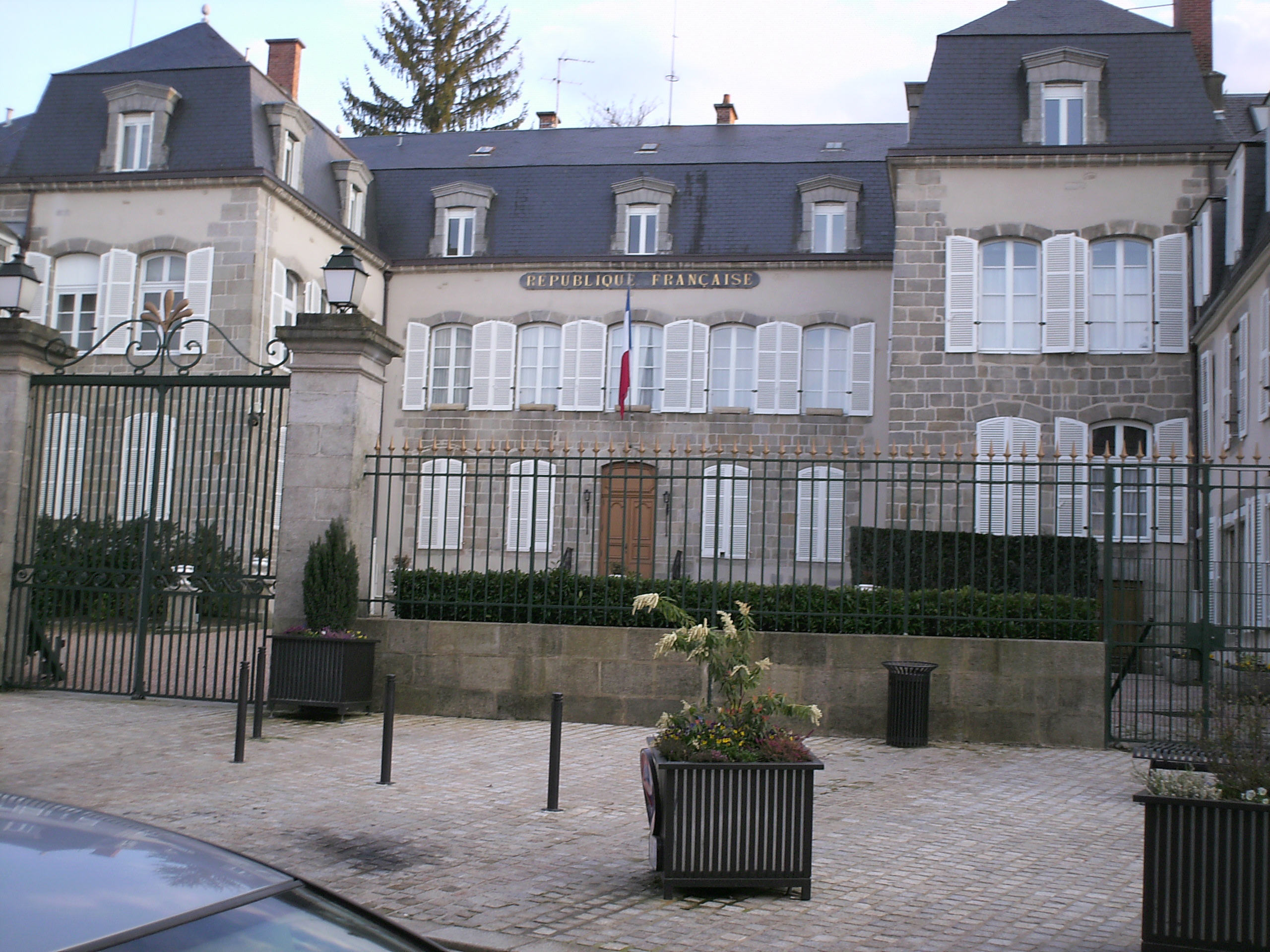
- Prefecture building of the Creuse department, in Guéret

- Flag Coat of arms

- Location of Creuse in France
- Coordinates: 46°07′20″N 1°54′46″E
- Country: France
- Region: Nouvelle-Aquitaine
- Prefecture: Guéret
- Subprefectures: Aubusson

Government
  - President of the Departmental Council: Valérie Simonet (LR)

Area^{1}
  - Total: 5,565 km^{2} (2,149 sq mi)

Population (2023)
  - Total: 115,527
  - Rank: 101st
  - Density: 20.76/km^{2} (53.77/sq mi)
- Time zone: UTC+1 (CET)
  - Summer (DST): UTC+2 (CEST)
- Department number: 23
- Arrondissements: 2
- Cantons: 15
- Communes: 255
- ^1 French Land Register data, which exclude estuaries and lakes, ponds and glaciers larger than 1 km^{2}

Creuse (French pronunciation: [kʁøz]; Occitan: Cruesa or Crosa) is a department in central France named after the river Creuse. After Lozère, it is the second least populated department in France. It is bordered by Indre and Cher to the north, Allier and Puy-de-Dôme to the east, Corrèze to the south, and Haute-Vienne to the west. With 115,527 inhabitants (2023), it is the second least populated department of France. Creuse is one of the most rural and sparsely populated departments in France, with a population density of 21 people/km^{2} (54 people/mi^{2}).

Guéret, the Prefecture of Creuse has a population approximately 12,000, making it the largest settlement in the department. The next biggest town is La Souterraine and then Aubusson. The department is situated in the former Province of La Marche. The land use is mostly agricultural and the department is well known for its chestnut and hazelnut production, and for the Charolais and Limousin cattle breeds.

== History ==
Creuse is one of the original 83 departments created during the French Revolution on 4 March 1790. It was created from the former province of La Marche.

The County of Marche was a county in medieval France that approximately corresponded to the modern département of Creuse. Marche first appeared as a separate fief around the mid-10th century, when William III, Duke of Aquitaine, gave it to one of his vassals named Boso, who took the title of count. In the 12th century, the countship passed to the family of Lusignan. They also were sometimes counts of Angoulême and counts of Limousin. With the death of the childless Count Guy in 1308, his possessions in La Marche were seized by Philip IV of France. In 1316 the king made La Marche an appanage for his youngest son the Prince, afterwards Charles IV. Several years later in 1327, La Marche passed into the hands of the House of Bourbon. The family of Armagnac held it from 1435 to 1477, when it reverted to the Bourbons. In 1527 La Marche was seized by Francis I and became part of the domains of the French crown. It was divided into Haute Marche and Basse Marche, the estates of the former continuing until the 17th century. From 1470 to the Revolution, the province was under the jurisdiction of the Parlement of Paris.

In 1886, Bourganeuf ville lumière, located in a remote part of Creuse, became somewhat improbably the third town in France to receive a public electricity supply. Three years later, in 1889, the construction of a primitive hydro-electric factory at Cascade of the Jarrauds (Cascade des Jarrauds) on the little river Maulde at Saint-Martin-Château, 14 kilometers (8.7 mi) away, established a more reliable electricity supply for the little town. The creation of a power line from the plant to Bourganeuf was supervised by an innovative engineer named Marcel Deprez; this was the first time that a power line over such a long distance had been constructed in France. The achievement was crowned with the region's first telephone line, which was installed to permit instant communication between the generating station and the newly illuminated town.

== Geography ==
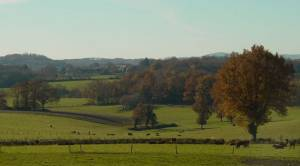
Creuse landscape

Creuse is part of the region of Nouvelle-Aquitaine.

It is in the Massif Central and permeated by the Creuse and its tributaries. The river is dammed at several locations both for water supply and hydroelectricity generation. As is typical for an inland area of continental Europe, Creuse has relatively cold winters with some snowfall into April, but also hot summers. Rain falls throughout the year because of the relatively high elevation.

The topography is principally rolling hills intersected by often steep valleys. The terrestrial ecology is typically cool temperate with a species mix common in the western UK: with oak, ash, chestnut, hazel and Prunus species dominating the woodlands. There are no commercial vineyards. Much of the farming is beef cattle: Charolais and Limousin, and also sheep.

=== Principal towns ===
The most populous commune is Guéret, the prefecture. As the second-least populous department of France, Creuse has no big cities and towns. As of 2023, there are 5 communes with more than 2,000 inhabitants:

Commune	Population (2023)
Guéret	12,955
La Souterraine	4,978
Aubusson	3,018
Sainte-Feyre	2,566
Bourganeuf	2,364

== Demographics ==
Historical population

Year	Pop.	±% p.a.
1791	238,352	—
1801	218,041	−0.89%
1806	226,283	+0.74%
1821	248,785	+0.63%
1831	265,384	+0.65%
1841	278,029	+0.47%
1851	287,075	+0.32%
1861	270,055	−0.61%
1872	274,663	+0.15%
1881	278,782	+0.17%
1891	284,660	+0.21%
1901	277,831	−0.24%
1911	266,235	−0.43%
1921	228,244	−1.53%

Year	Pop.	±% p.a.
1931	207,882	−0.93%
1936	201,844	−0.59%
1946	188,669	−0.67%
1954	172,702	−1.10%
1962	163,515	−0.68%
1968	156,876	−0.69%
1975	146,214	−1.00%
1982	139,968	−0.62%
1990	131,349	−0.79%
1999	124,470	−0.60%
2007	123,861	−0.06%
2012	121,517	−0.38%
2017	118,638	−0.48%
2023	115,527	−0.44%

The population peaked at 287,075 in 1851, after which it declined gently until the First World War. During and after the war, the decline in population became much more rapid both because of the death and disruption that characterised the war years and because of the higher wages available to any workers with marketable skills in the economically more dynamic towns and cities outside Creuse. By 1921 the registered population had slumped by almost 38,000 (approximately 14%) in ten years to 228,244, and the decline continued throughout the twentieth century.

Over the last four decades of the twentieth century Creuse experienced the greatest proportional population decline of any French department, from 164,000 in 1960 to 124,000 in 1999 – a decrease of 24%. The department is thus unofficially sometimes dubbed as the "capital of French depopulation".

== Politics ==
The President of the Departmental Council is Valérie Simonet of The Republicans.

Party	Seats
The Republicans	12
Miscellaneous right	6
Socialist Party	8
Miscellaneous left	4

=== Current National Assembly Representative ===
Constituency	Member	Party
Creuse's constituency	Bartholomé Lenoir	Union of the Right for the Republic

== Culture ==
=== Language ===
Until the 1980s, Occitan was the primary language of rural areas. There remain three different Occitan dialects in use in Limousin, although their use is rapidly declining. These are:

- Limousin (Occitan: Lemosin) dialect
- Auvergnat (Occitan: Auvernhat) dialect in the East
- in the North, the Crescent transition area between Occitan and French is sometimes considered as a separate (basically Occitan) dialect called Marchois (Occitan: Marchés).

=== Cuisine ===
The Creuse Cake is a dessert named after the region. It is made with butter and hazelnuts. There are many varieties, and they are sold throughout France.

== Notable people ==
- George Sand (1804–1878) She situated some of the action of her 1844 novel Jeanne in rural Boussac.
- Thierry Ardisson (1949- ), host and journalist
- Pierre d'Aubusson (1423–1503), Grand Master of the order of St. John of Jerusalem (the Knights Hospitaller) .
- Jacques Barraband (1767–1809) painter and draftsman
- Léonard-Léopold Forgemol de Bostquénard (1821–1897), general in the French Army.
- Jean de Brosse (1375–1433) councillor to Charles VII of France
- Gustave Caillebotte (1848–1894) Impressionist painter, owned a castle in Creuse
- Gilles Clément (1943- ): prizewinning park and landscape designer
- François Denhaut (1877–1952) inventor of flying boats
- David Feuerwerker (1912–1980), rabbi of Creuse.
- Armand Guillaumin (1841–1927) impressionist painter
- Jean Guitton (1901–1999) Catholic philosopher and theologian
- Marcel Jouhandeau (1888–1979) writer
- Lucien Le Cam (1924–2000) statistician
- Pierre Leroux (1797–1871) philosopher and political economist
- Jean Lurçat (1892–1966) tapestry artist
- Jules Marouzeau (1878–1964) Latinist and philologist
- Pierre Michon (1945- ) novelist
- Martin Nadaud (1815–1898) politician and writer
- Raymond Poulidor (1936–2019) cyclist
- Michael Riffaterre (1924–2006), writer and critic
- Maurice Rollinat (1846–1903) poet
- Jules Sandeau (1811–1883) novelist
- Georges Sarre (1935- ) Secretary of State
- Antoine Varillas (1624–1696) historian
- Hubert Védrine (1947- ) Minister of Foreign Affairs
- Jacques Laffite (1943- ) racing driver
- Jean-Pierre Jabouille (1942- ) racing driver has creusoises origins and has a property in Creuse, sponsor of a motor rally Creusekistan
- Marcel Balsa, born on 1 January 1909 in Saint-Frion and died 11 August 1984 in Maisons-Alfort, French driver.
- Nathalie Baye (1948- ) actor is a resident of the department
- Victor Lanoux the actor settles in Creuse to La Chapelle-Taillefert
- The lawyer Serge Klarsfeld and the comic Popeck took refuge through the organization of Felix Chevrier, the castle Masgelier in Le Grand-Bourg and stayed there several months
- François Baroin, French politician native son of Dun-le-Palestel The summers were devoted to the Creuse, where the mother of the little Frenchman had a house.
- Jean-Francois Cope, French politician
- Claude Chabrol, filmmaker, spent part of his childhood in Sardent with his grandmother
- Jean Auclair, (1946-) is a French politician.
- Michel Vergnier, (1946-) Socialist politician, deputy mayor of Gueret since 29 November 1998.

== Tourism ==
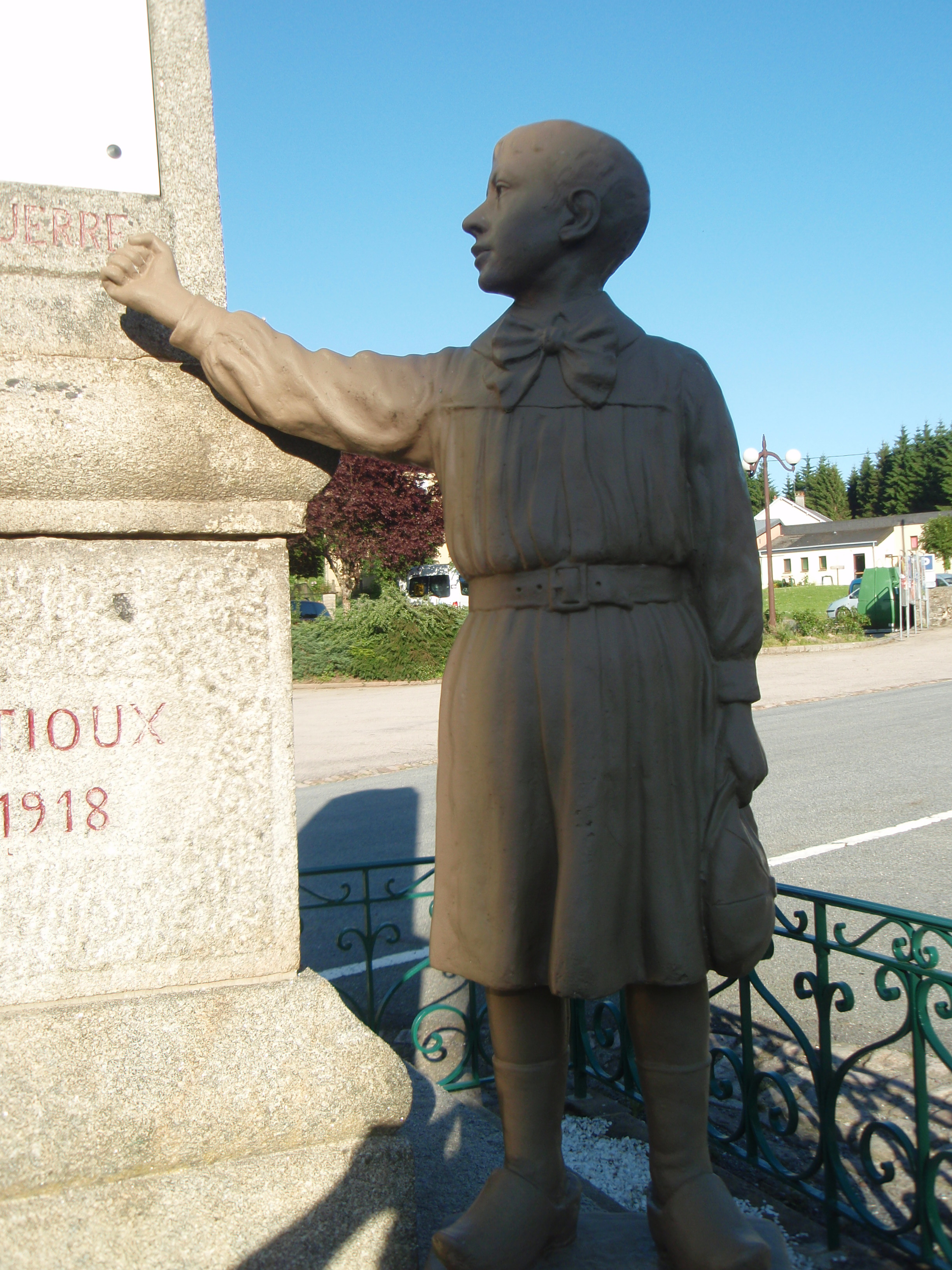
Famous pacifist World War I memorial in Gentioux

As a traditionally rural and lightly populated area, with ancient and typical art de vivre, original stone architecture, no major urban centre and many heritage sites such as castles, abbeys and Celtic stone monuments: the Creuse department has become a Green tourism destination since the late 1990s. Creuse enjoys a temperate climate with mild springs and autumns, rather cold and snowy but sunny winters, and relatively warm and sunny summers, but not as hot as in the southern parts of France. Many foreigners (notably British and Dutch, but also German and Belgian) have sought to buy holiday homes in Creuse due to its preserved forested landscape, little pollution and stone buildings.

The major tourist attractions are the tapestry museum in Aubusson and the many castles, notably those of Villemonteix, Boussac, and Banizette. The monastery of Moutier-d'Ahun has exceptional wood carvings from the 17th century. (fr:Abbaye de Moutier-d'Ahun). After World War 1, some towns in France set up pacifist war memorials. Instead of commemorating the glorious dead, these memorials denounce war with figures of grieving widows and children rather than soldiers. Such memorials provoked anger among veterans and the military in general. The most famous is at Gentioux-Pigerolles in the department (see picture on the left). Below the column which lists the name of the fallen, stands an orphan in bronze pointing to an inscription 'Maudite soit la guerre' (Cursed be war). Feelings ran so high that the memorial was not officially inaugurated until 1990 and soldiers at the nearby army camp were under orders to turn their heads when they walked past.

The Chapelle du Mas-Saint-Jean is in Saint-Sulpice-le-Dunois. A local legend declares that Joan of Arc prayed there in about 1430.

Guéret, Creuse is also home to a large nearby animal park named Les Loups de Chabrières containing some of France's few remaining wolves, held in semi-captivity. It includes 24 European Grey Wolves, two Canadian White Wolves and two Canadian Black Wolves in five enclosures.

Motor racing Mas du Clos It is twelve kilometres from Aubusson at the foot of the family castle of Saint-Avit-de-Tardes. Pierre Bardinon creates all pieces in 1963.

== Gallery ==
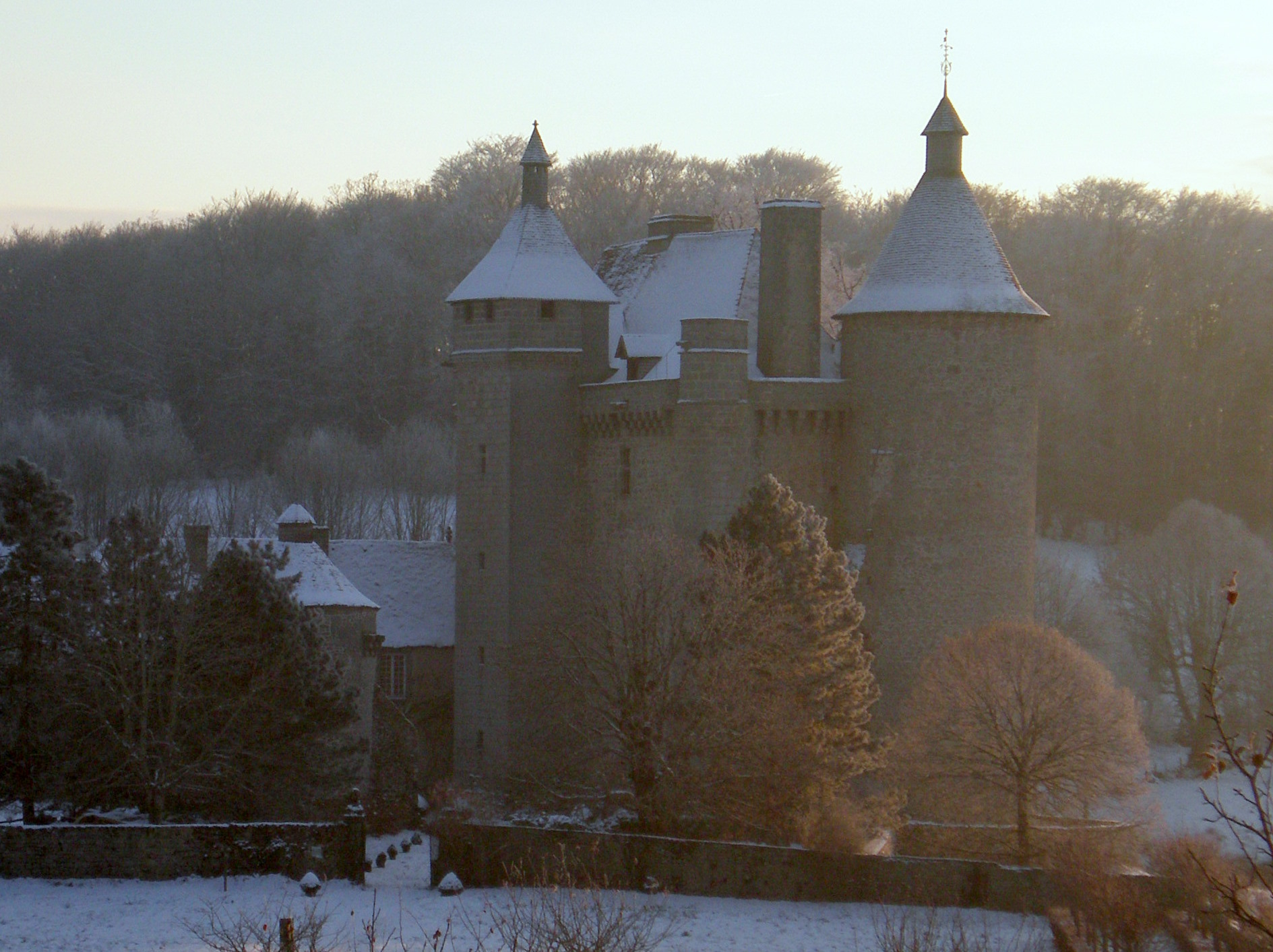
Villemonteix Castle in winter

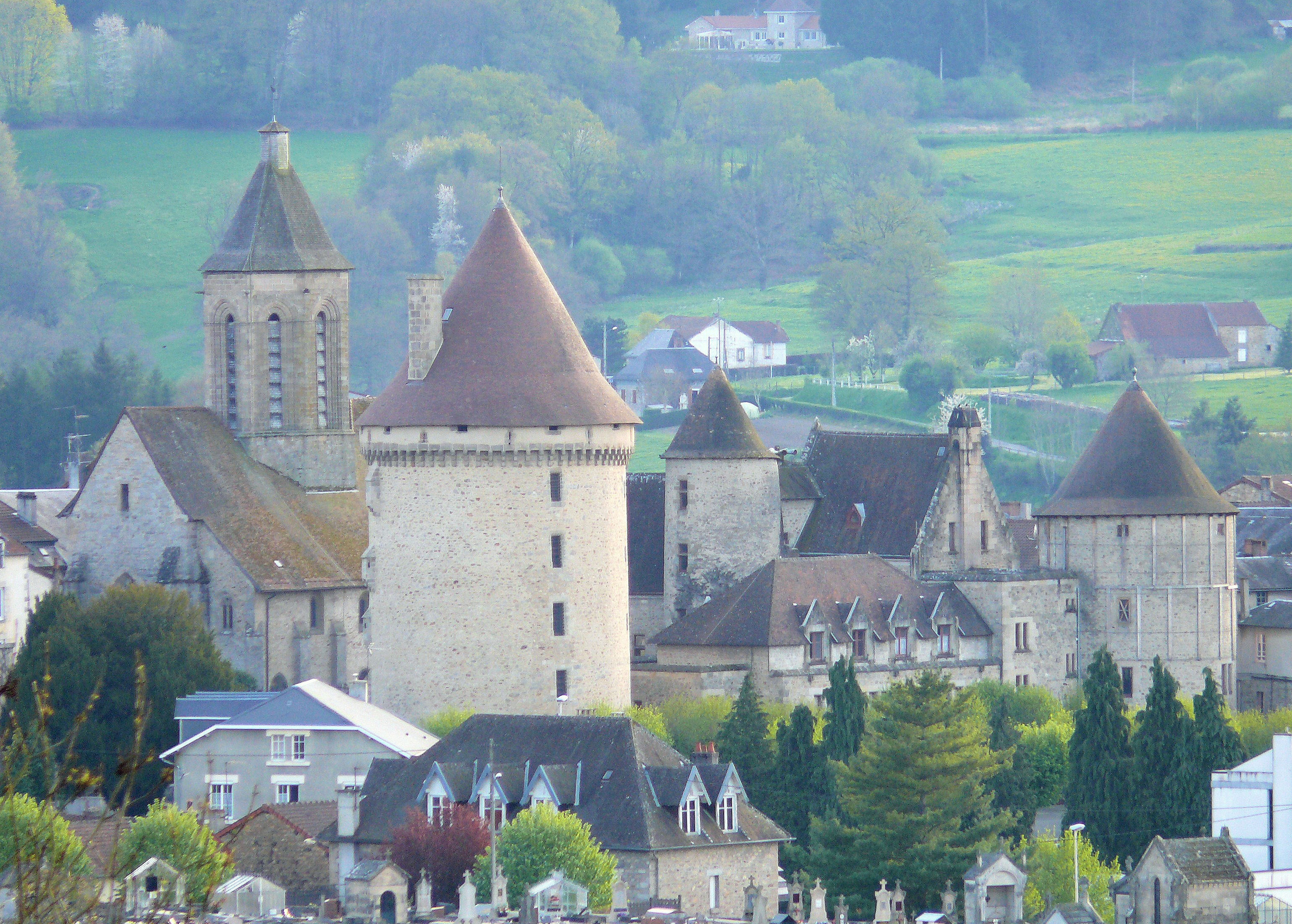
Bourganeuf Castle with infamous Cem Sultan tower

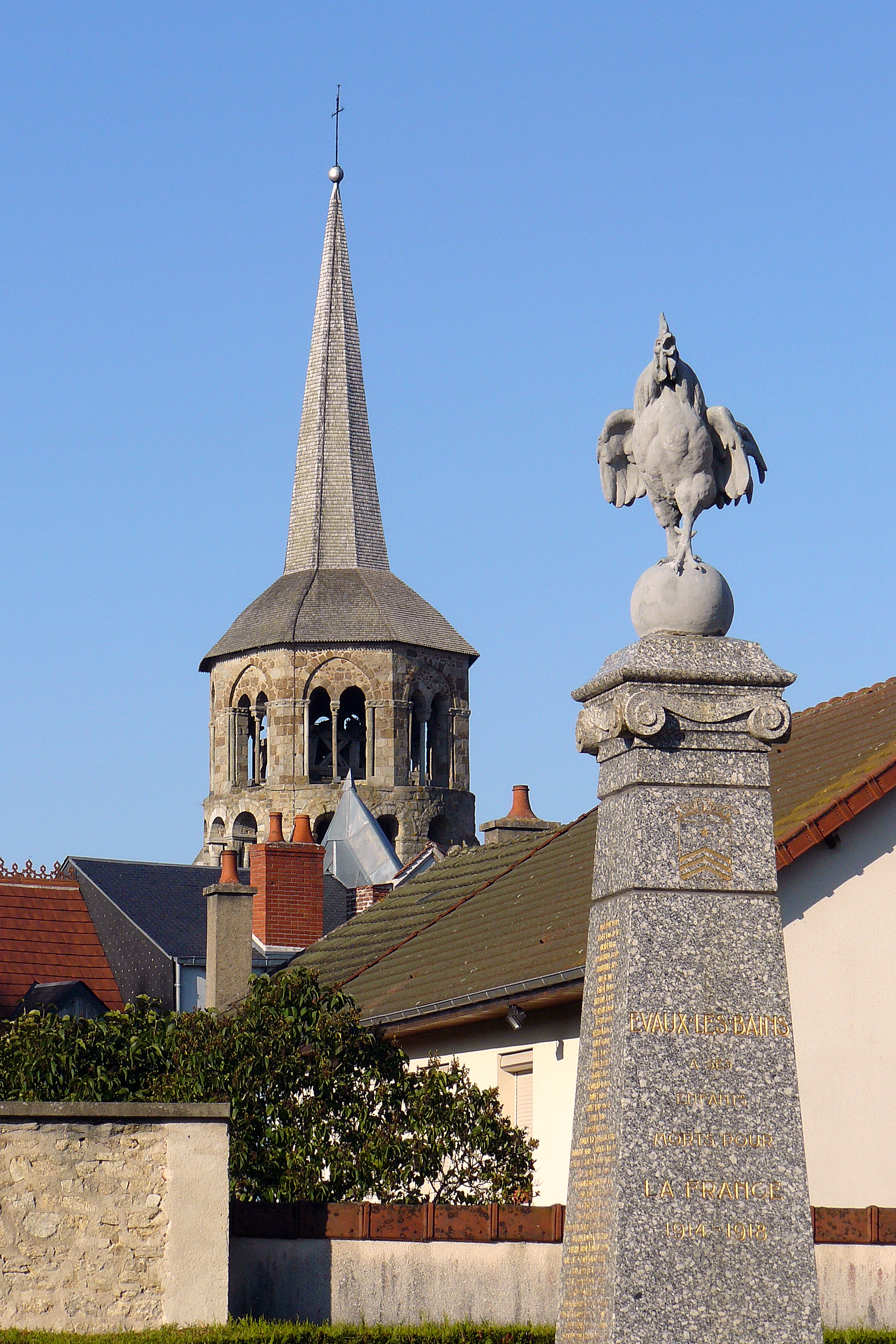
View of Evaux-les-Bains

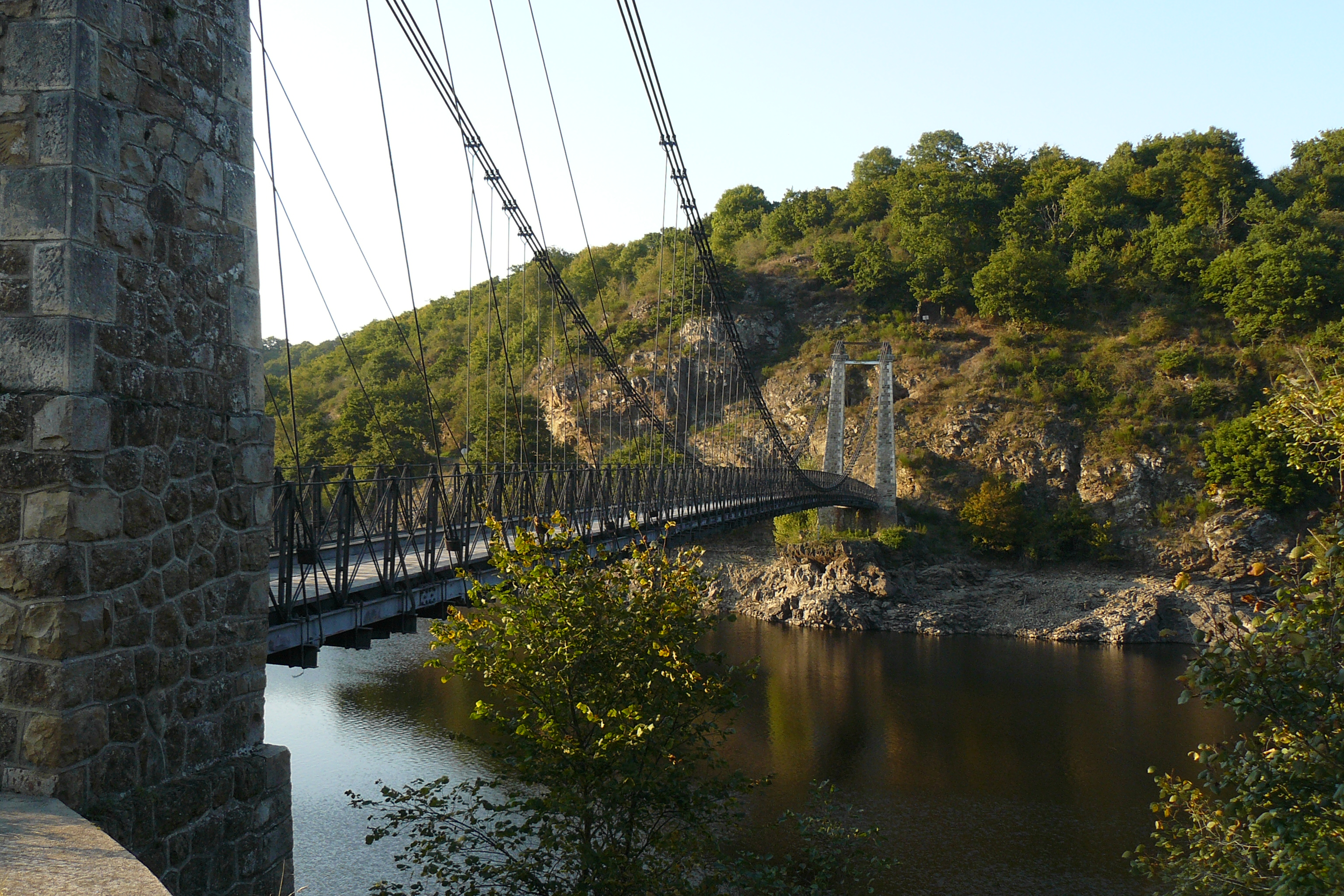
19th-century bridge architecture in Creuse

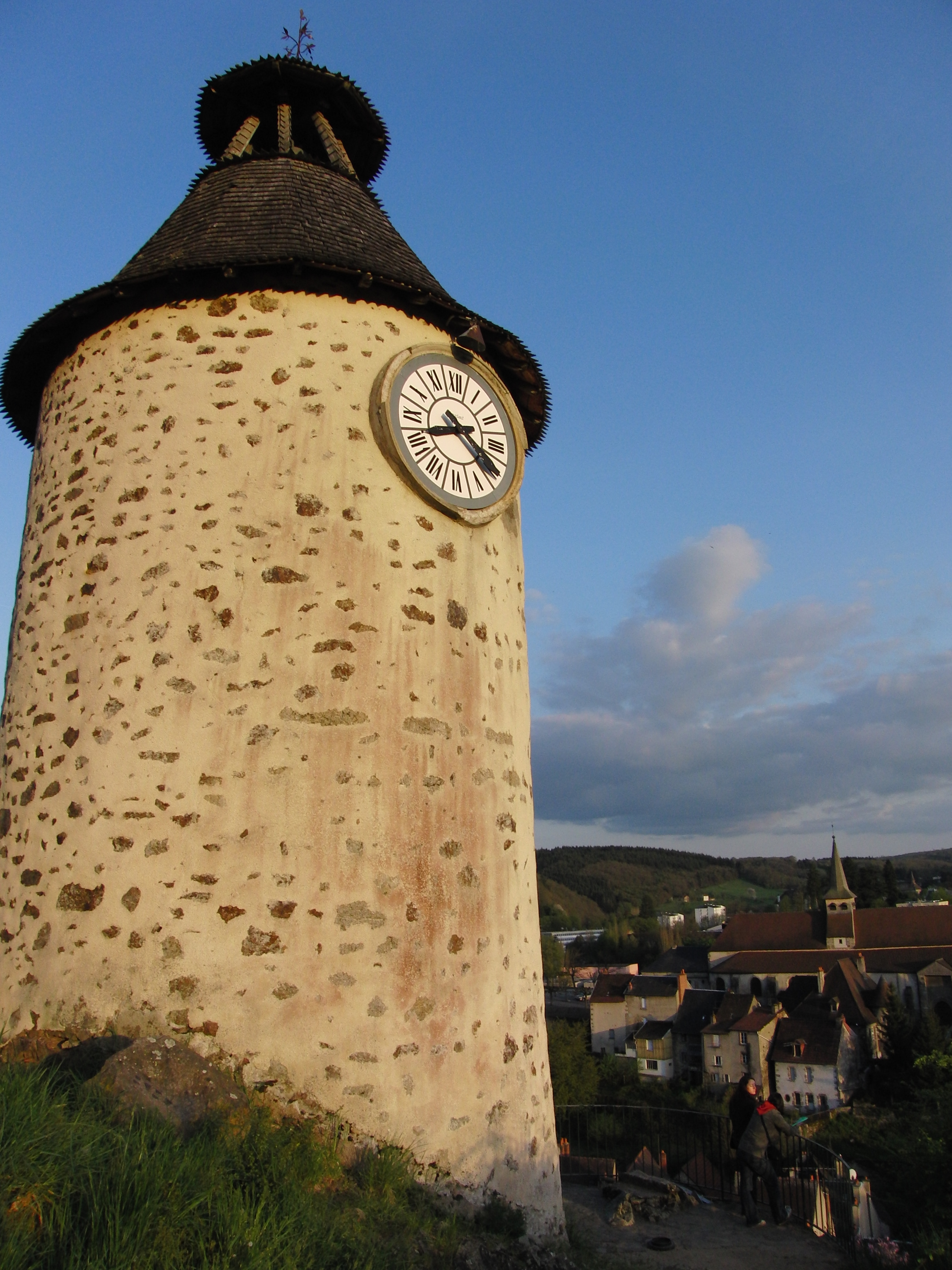
Aubusson's Medieval Clock Tower

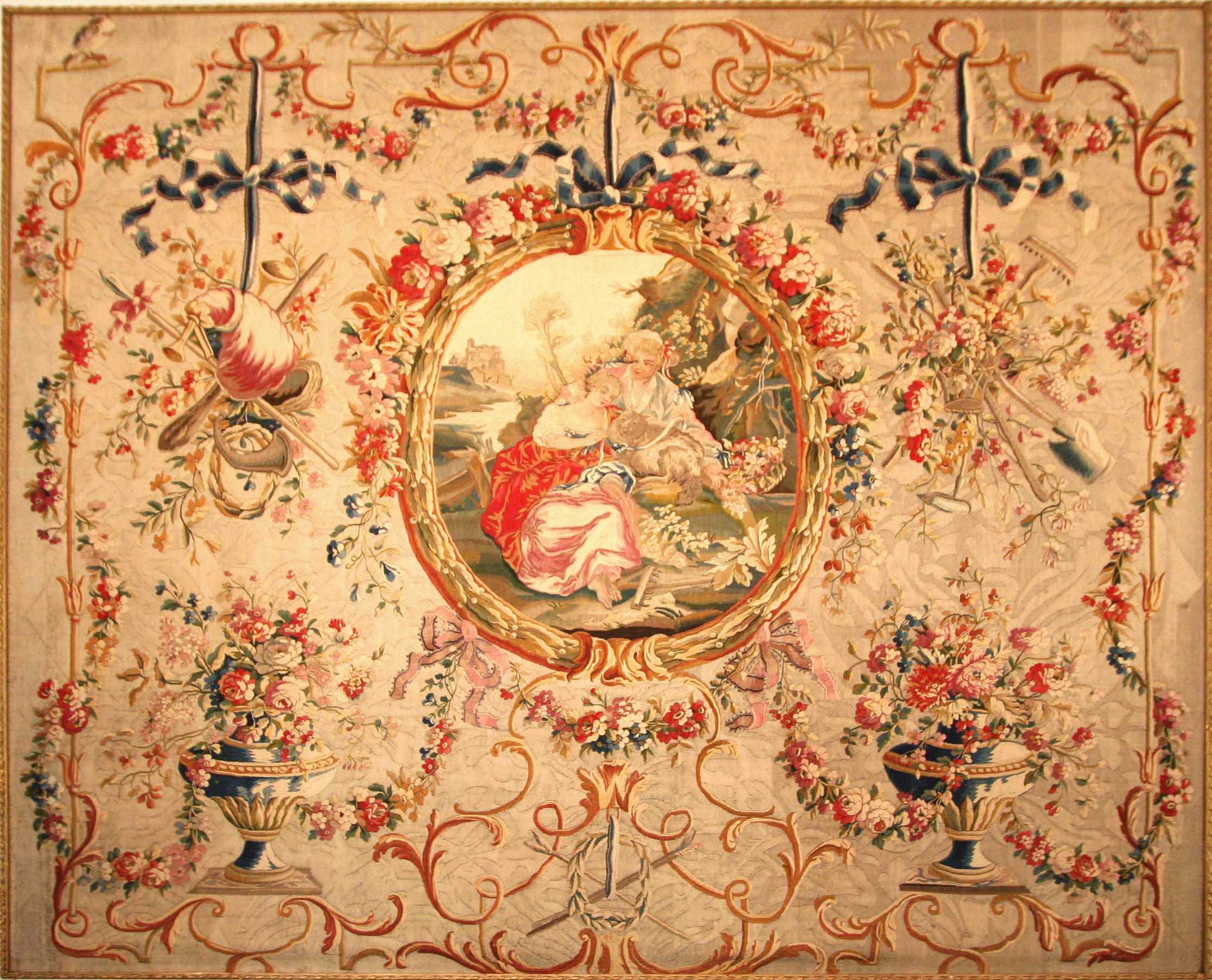
typical Aubusson tapestry

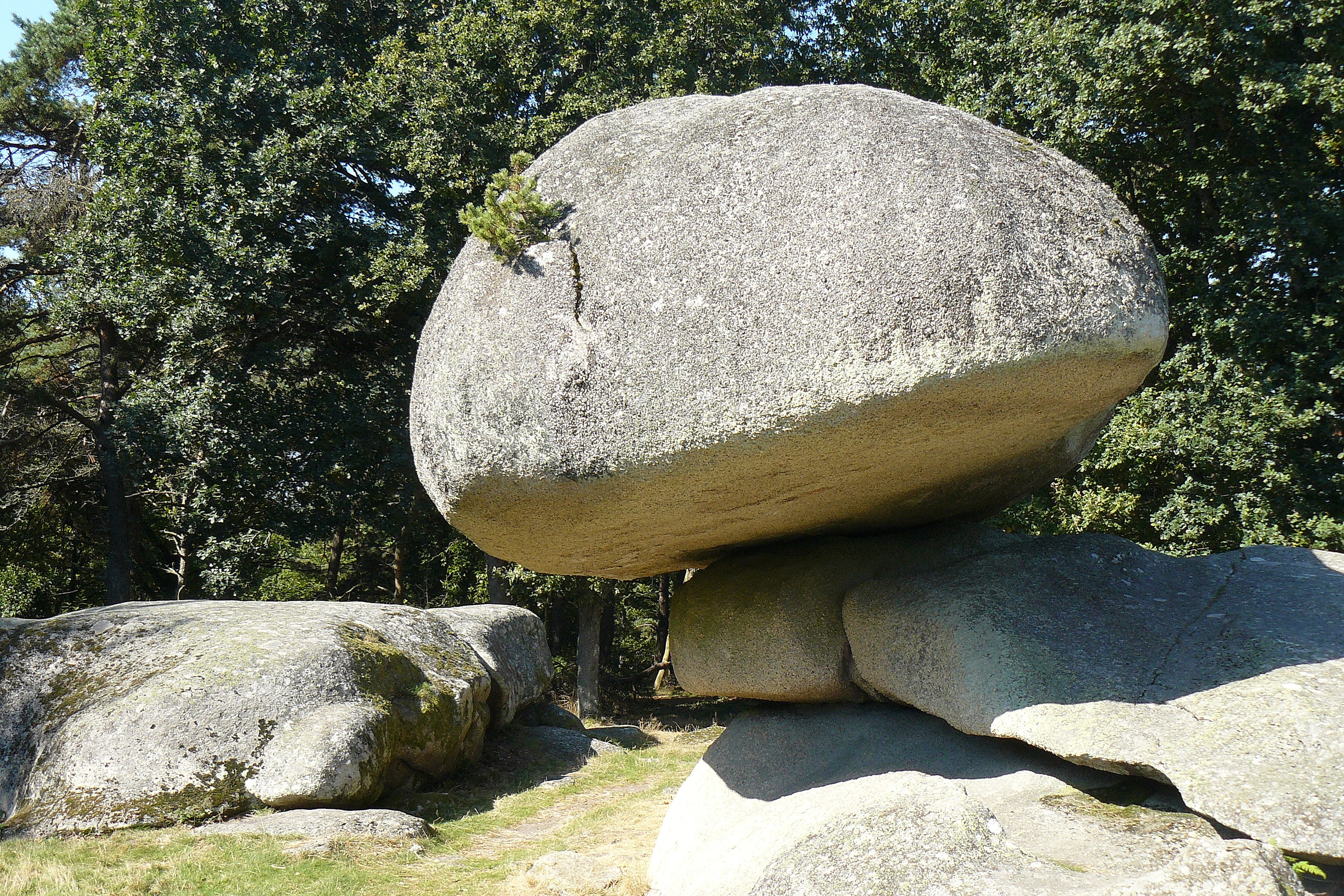
Natural granitic site of Les Pierres-Jaumâtres, in Creuse

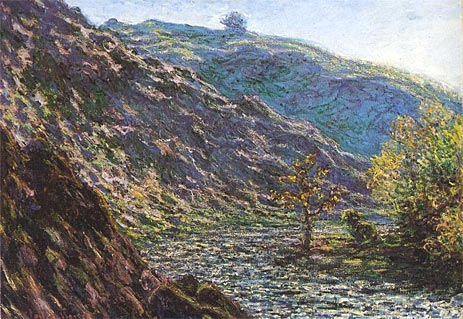
Monet's Petite Creuse, 1889

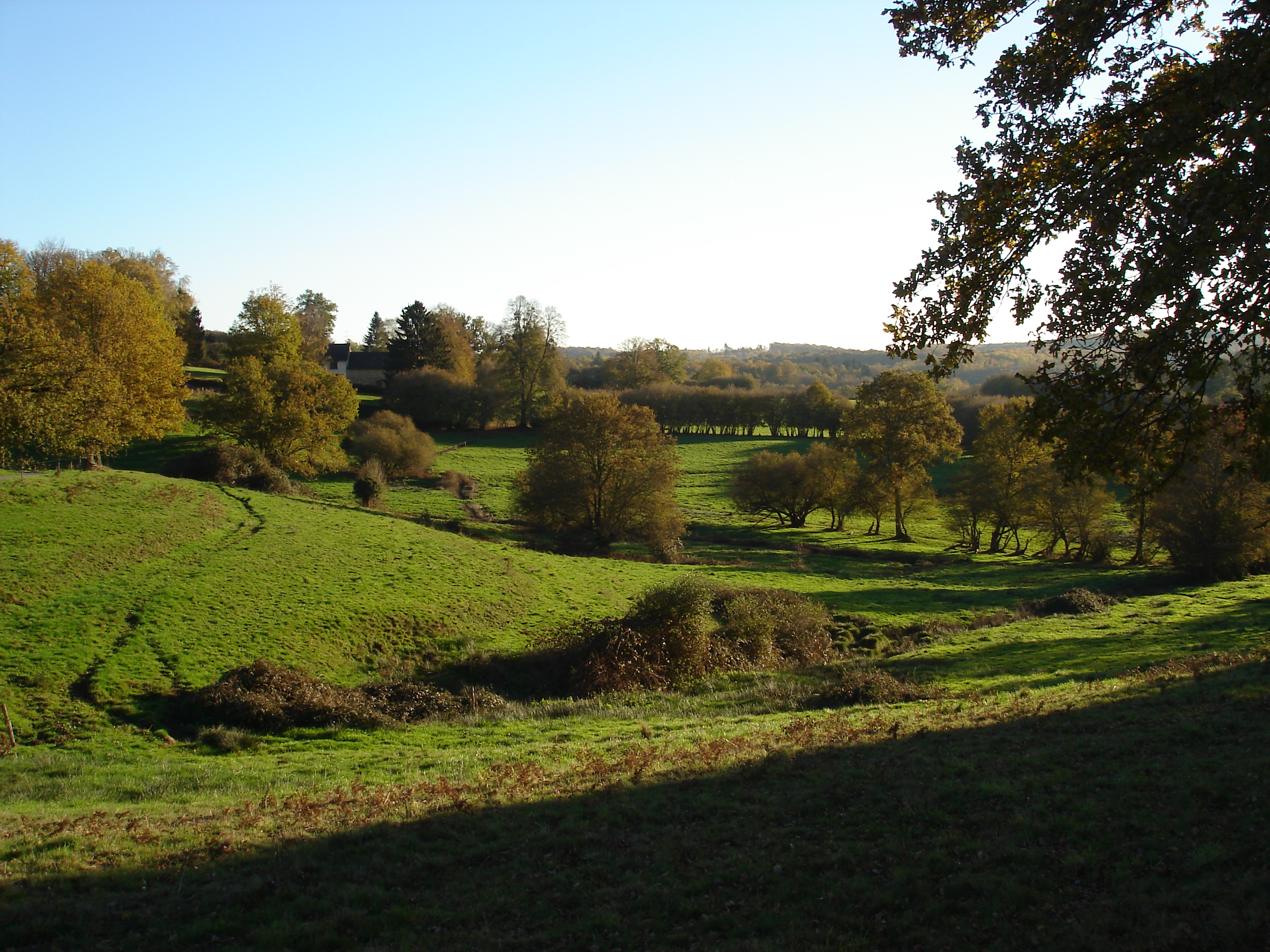
Western Creuse typical landscape

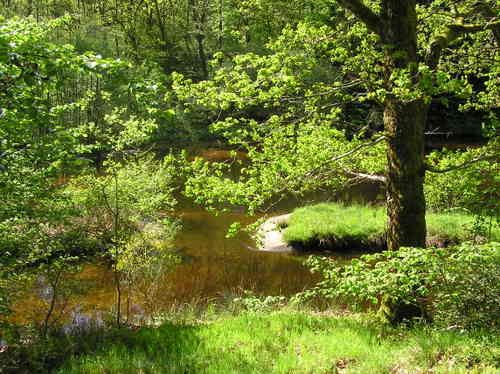
Small river in Creuse

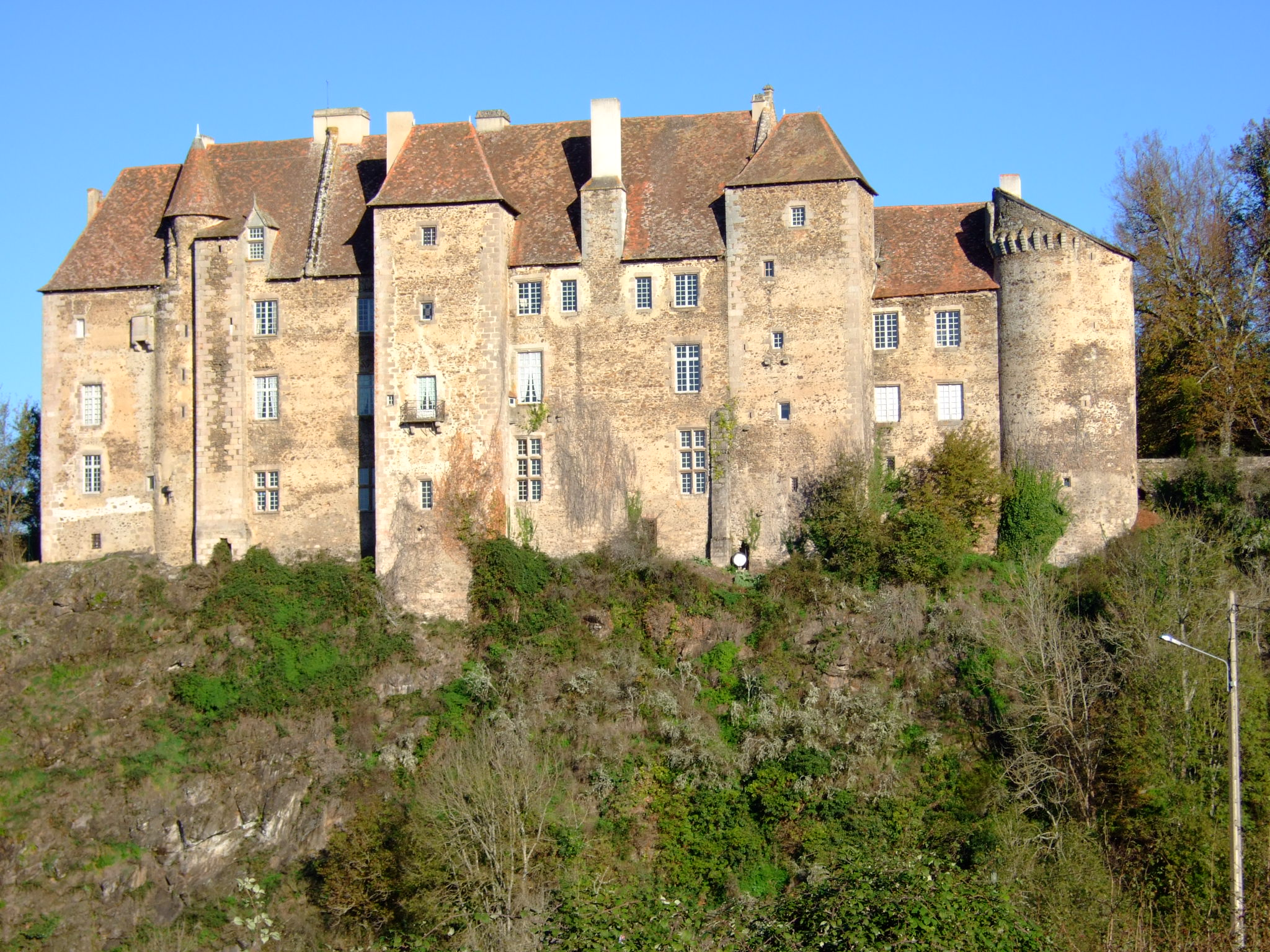
Boussac Castle, Creuse

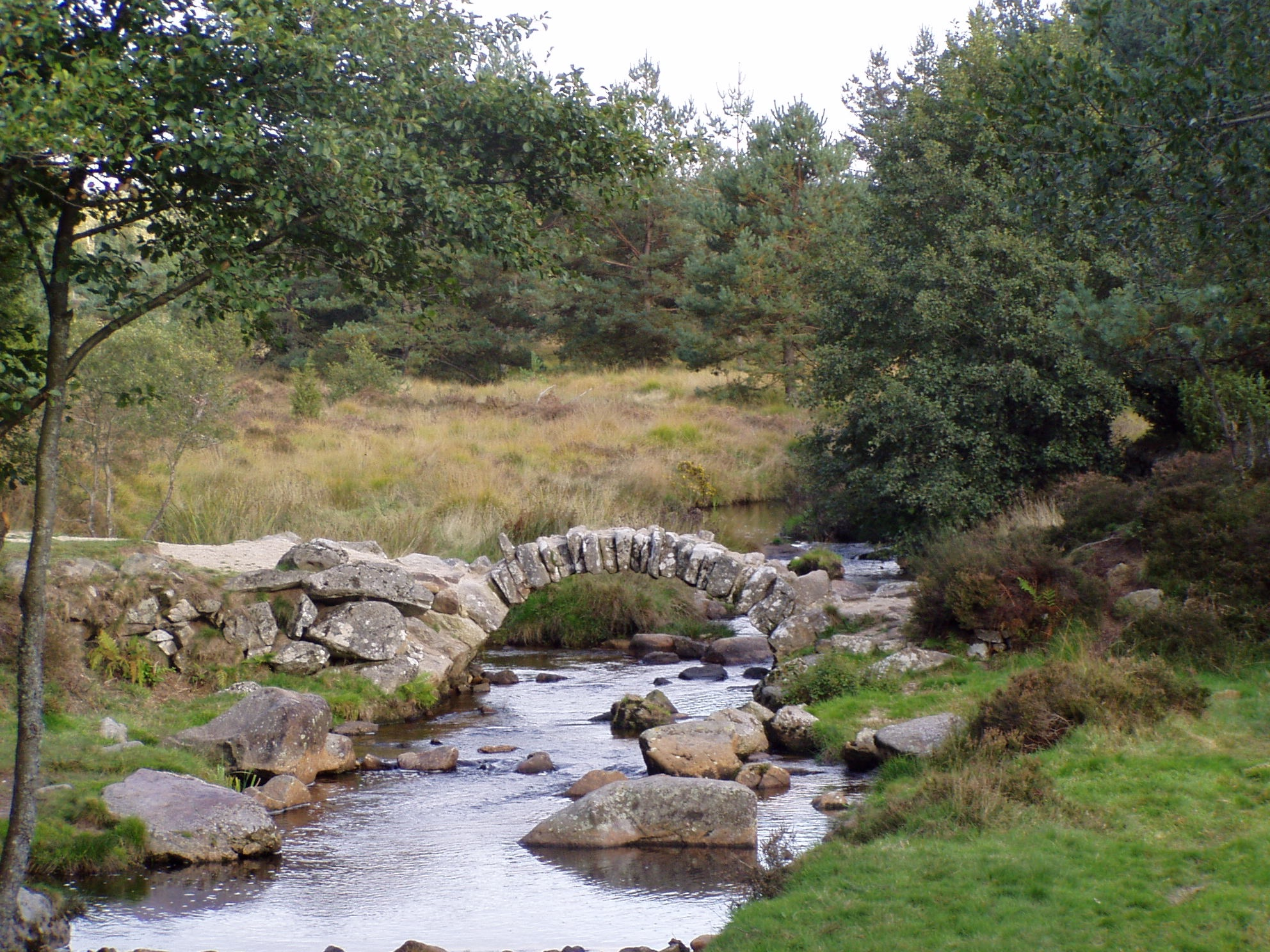
Senoueix Bridge

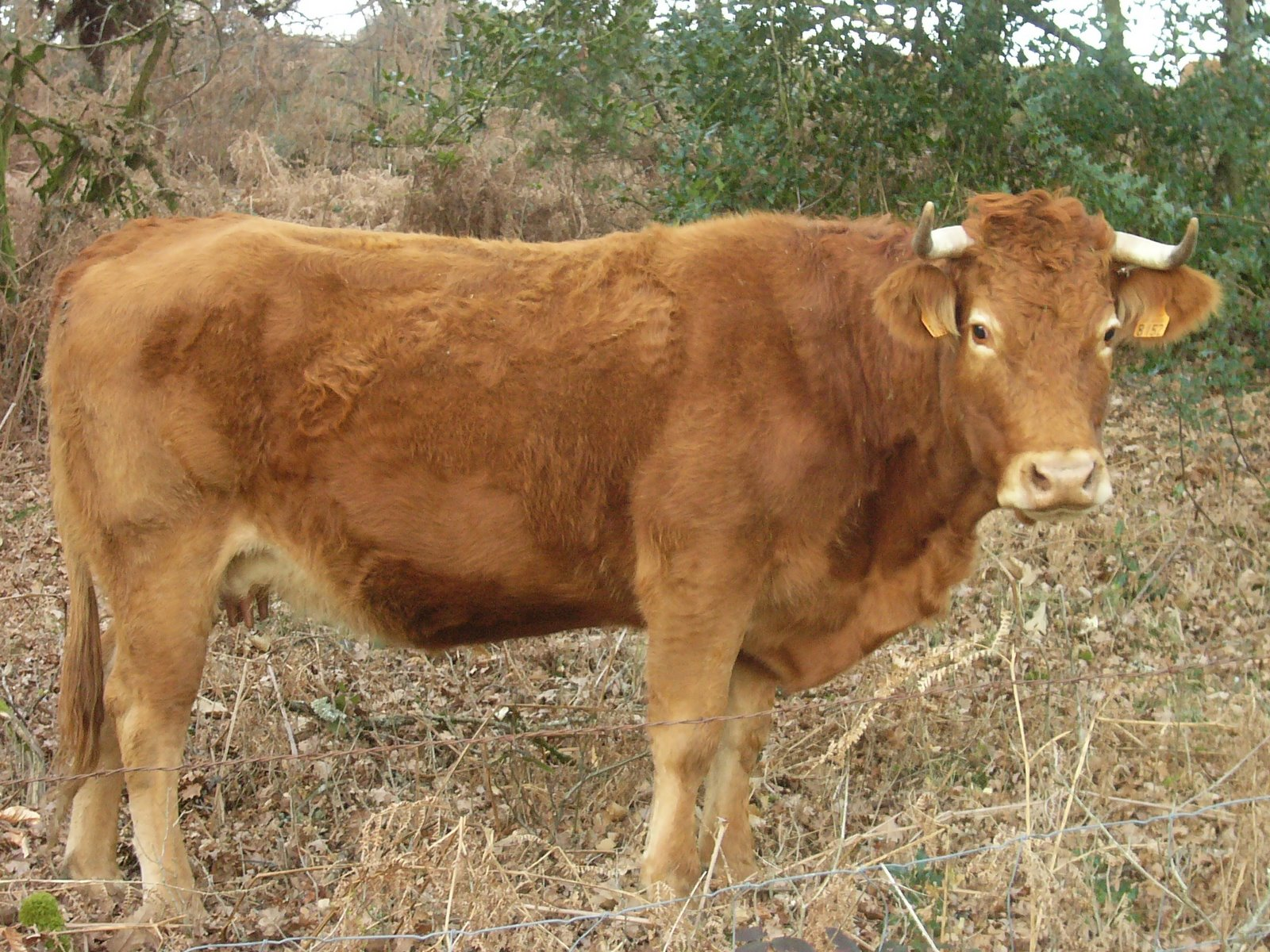
typical Limousin cattle in Creuse

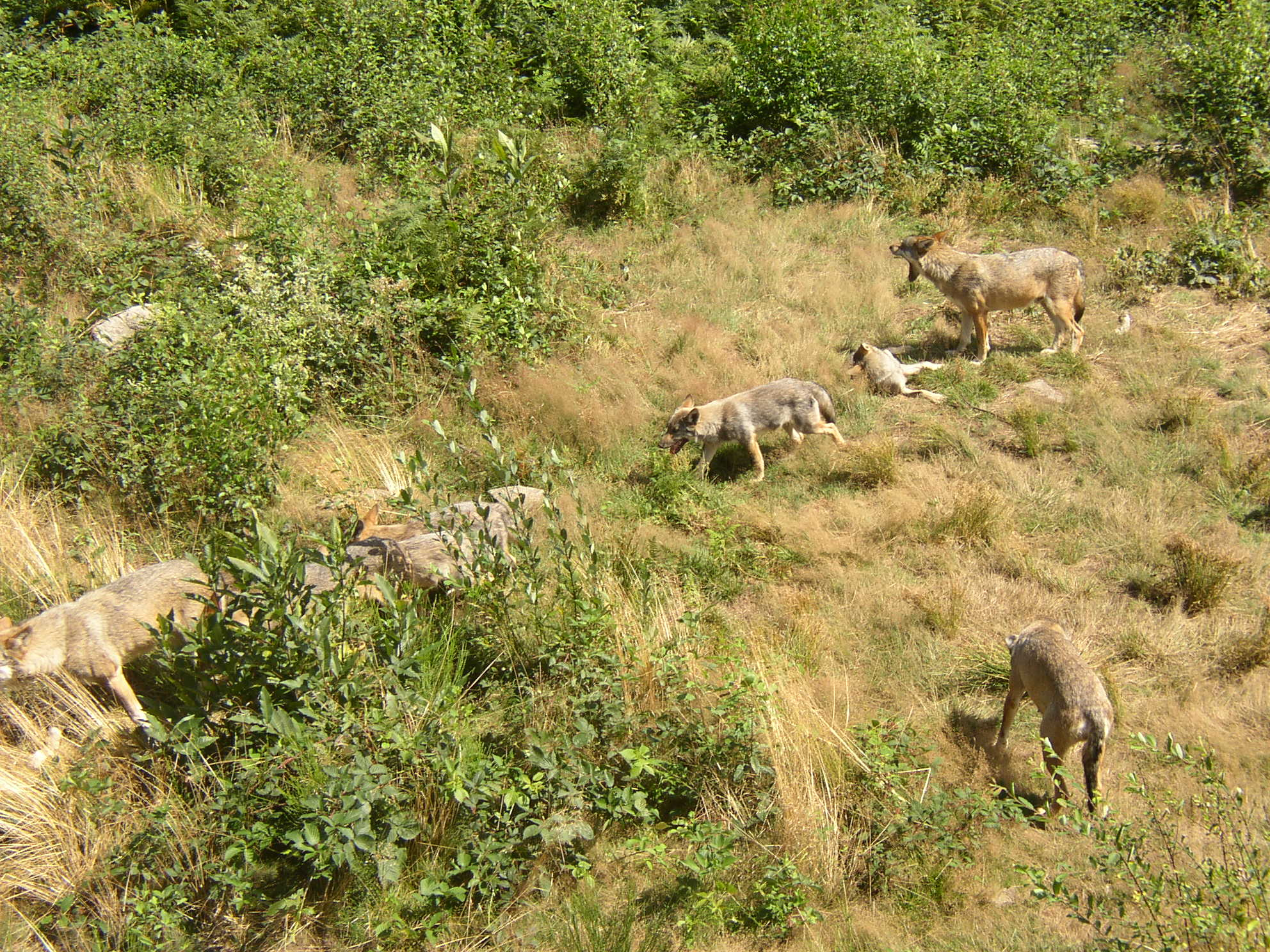
The wolves of Chabrières

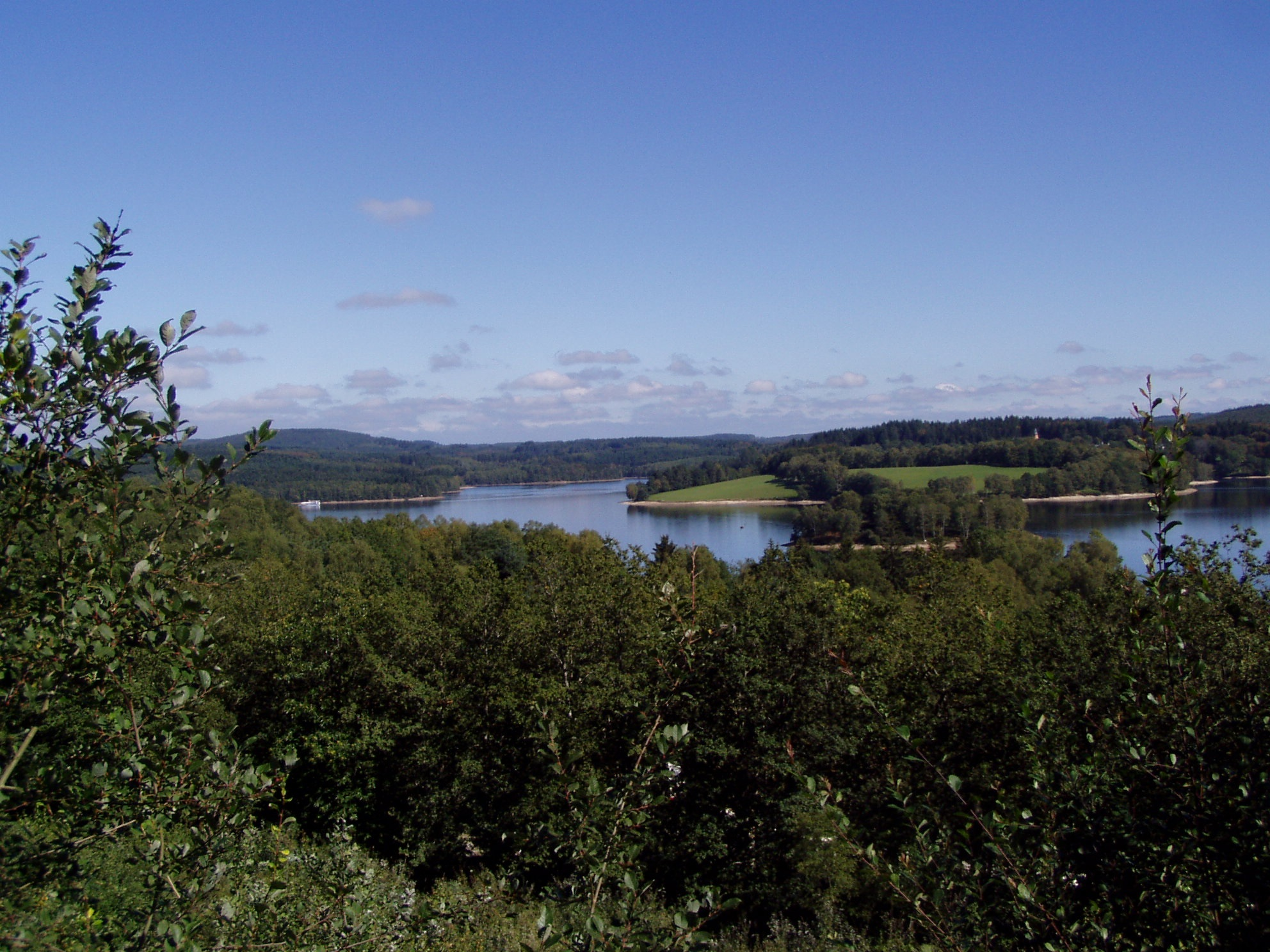
Lake Vassivière in Creuse

== See also ==
- Cantons of the Creuse department
- Communes of the Creuse department
- Arrondissements of the Creuse department
