= Canton of Guéret-Nord =

Coordinates: 46°13′15″N 1°56′45″E

Guéret-Nord
- Former canton
- Interactive map of Guéret-Nord
- Country: France
- Region: Nouvelle-Aquitaine
- Department: Creuse
- No. of communes: {{{nbcomm}}}
- Disbanded: 2015
- Population (2012): 9,063

The Canton of Guéret-Nord was a canton in the Creuse département, located in the Limousin region of central France. It was disbanded following the French canton reorganisation, which took effect in March 2015. As of 2012, it had a population of 9,063.

== Geography ==
The canton was an area of farming and light industry in the arrondissement of Guéret, centred around the town of Guéret. The altitude ranges from 283m (Jouillat) to 685m (Guéret) with an average altitude of 424m.

The canton comprised 6 communes:

- Ajain
- Glénic
- Guéret (partly)
- Jouillat
- Ladapeyre
- Saint-Fiel

== See also ==
- Arrondissements of the Creuse department
- Cantons of the Creuse department
- Communes of the Creuse department
