= List of senators of Creuse =

Location of Creuse in France

Following is a list of senators of Creuse, people who have represented the department of Creuse in the Senate of France.

== Third Republic ==
Senators for Creuse under the French Third Republic were:

In office	Name	Party
1876–1884	Emile Jacques-Palotte	
1876–1885	Joseph-Edmond Fayolle	Moderate Republican
1885–1894	Paul Laroche	
1885–1894	Eugène Parry	Conservative
1889–1895	Pierre Lecler	
1889	Frédéric Sauton	
1894–1912	Jean-Baptiste Dufoussat	Democratic Left
1894–1907	Ferdinand Villard	Democratic Left
1896–1900	Gervais Rousseau	Democratic Left
1900–1903	Léon Renard	
1903–1921	Pierre Mazière	Democratic Left
1907–1921	Alphonse Defumade	Democratic Left
1912–1922	Hippolyte Simonet	Democratic Left
1921–1930	Léon Chagnaud	
1921–1937	Alfred Grand	Democratic Left
1922–1925	René Viviani	Democratic Left
1925–1938	Victor Judet	Democratic Left
1930–1930	François Binet	Democratic Left
1931–1938	Henri Connevot	Democratic Left
1937–1945	Camille Ferrand	Democratic Left
1939–1945	Henri Alhéritière	Democratic Left
1939–1945	Auguste Chambonnet	Democratic Left

== Fourth Republic ==
Senators for Creuse under the French Fourth Republic were:

In office	Name	Party
1948–1959	Gaston Chazette	French Section of the Workers' International (SFIO)
1946–1959	Paul Pauly	French Section of the Workers' International (SFIO)

== Fifth Republic ==
Senators for Creuse under the French Fifth Republic:

In office	Name	Group	Notes
1959–1980	Eugène Romaine	Groupe de la Gauche Démocratique	
1962–1973	Paul Pauly	Groupe socialiste	Elected 23 September 1962; Died in office 27 June 1973
1973–2008	Michel Moreigne	Groupe socialiste	Replaced Paul Pauly on 27 June 1973
1980–1981	André Lejeune	Groupe socialiste	Resigned 21 June 1981 (elected deputy)
1981–1998	William Chervy	Groupe socialiste	Elected 27 September 1981
1998–2009	André Lejeune	Groupe socialiste	Died in office 9 September 2009
2009–2014	Renée Nicoux	Groupe socialiste	Replaced André Lejeune on 10 September 2009
From 2008	Jean-Jacques Lozach	Groupe socialiste et républicain	
From 2014	Éric Jeansannetas	Groupe socialiste et républicain	

== Sources ==
- Liste des anciens sénateurs de la IIIème République par circonscription (in French), Sénat de France
- Liste des anciens sénateurs de la IVème République par circonscription (in French), Sénat de France
- Liste des anciens sénateurs de la Vème République par circonscription (in French), Sénat de France
- Liste par département - Creuse (in French), Sénat de France
