= Canton of Guéret-Sud-Ouest =

Coordinates: 46°07′13″N 1°51′19″E

Guéret-Sud-Ouest
- Former canton
- Interactive map of Guéret-Sud-Ouest
- Country: France
- Region: Nouvelle-Aquitaine
- Department: Creuse
- No. of communes: {{{nbcomm}}}
- Disbanded: 2015
- Population (2012): 5,177

The Canton of Guéret-Sud-Ouest is a former canton situated in the Creuse département and in the Limousin region of central France. It was disbanded following the French canton reorganisation which came into effect in March 2015. It had 5,177 inhabitants (2012).

== Geography ==
An area of farming and light industry in the arrondissement of Guéret, centred on the town of Guéret. The altitude varies from 350m (Guéret) to 690m (La Chapelle-Taillefert) with an average altitude of 491m.

The canton comprised 5 communes:

- La Chapelle-Taillefert
- Guéret (partly)
- Savennes
- Saint-Christophe
- Saint-Victor-en-Marche

== See also ==
- Arrondissements of the Creuse department
- Cantons of the Creuse department
- Communes of the Creuse department
