= 2024 French legislative election in Creuse =

Following the first round of the 2024 French legislative election on 30 June 2024, runoff elections in each constituency where no candidate received a vote share greater than 50 percent were scheduled for 7 July. Candidates permitted to stand in the runoff elections needed to either come in first or second place in the first round or achieve more than 12.5 percent of the votes of the entire electorate (as opposed to 12.5 percent of the vote share due to low turnout).

== Creuse ==
=== Sole constituency ===
Candidate	Party or alliance		First round		Second round	
Candidate	Party or alliance		Votes	%	Votes	%
Bartolomé Lenoir	Union of the far right	The Republicans	20,403	33.35	23,513	37.69
Catherine Couturier	New Popular Front	La France Insoumise	14,359	23.47	21,757	34.87
Valérie Simonet	Miscellaneous right	Independent	13,536	22.12	17,121	27.44
Jean-Baptiste Moreau	Ensemble	Renaissance	10,670	17.44		
Catherine Dumon	Far-left	Lutte Ouvrière	958	1.57		
Florence Verheyen Valade	Miscellaneous centre	Independent	763	1.25		
Ana Pinson	Reconquête		493	0.81		
Total			61,182	100.00	62,391	100.00
Valid votes			61,182	96.26	62,391	96.58
Invalid votes			907	1.43	784	1.21
Blank votes			1,468	2.31	1,425	2.21
Total votes			63,557	100.00	64,600	100.00
Registered voters/turnout			89,980	70.63	89,953	71.82
