= Creuse's constituency =

Constituency of the National Assembly of France

Constituency of Creuse
- inline Constituency of the National Assembly of France

- Creuse in France
- Deputy: Bartolomé Lenoir; LR (UXD)
- Department: Creuse
- Cantons: Entire Department

The constituency of Creuse (French: circonscription de la Creuse) is a French legislative constituency for the entire Creuse department. It elects one deputy to the National Assembly.

== Constituencies in the Department ==
Prior to the 2010 redistricting of French legislative constituencies, the department had two constituencies.

The first constituency consisted of the cantons of Bénévent-l'Abbaye, Bonnat, Bourganeuf, Dun-le-Palestel, Le Grand-Bourg, Guéret Nord, Guéret Sud-Est, Guéret Sud-Ouest, Saint-Vaury, and La Souterraine.

The second constituency consisted of the cantons of Ahun, Aubusson, Auzances, Bellegarde-en-Marche, Boussac, Chambon-sur-Voueize, Châtelus-Malvaleix, Chénérailles, La Courtine, Crocq, Evaux-les-Bains, Felletin, Gentioux-Pigerolles, Jarnages, Pontarion, Royère-de-Vassivière, and Saint-Sulpice-les-Champs. The second constituency's last deputy was elected at the 2007 election.

== Historic representation ==
This table shows the historic representation of Creuse's 1st constituency up to the 2012 election, which was the first election with only one constituency for the whole department.

Election	Member	Party
1958	Olivier Harty de Pierrebourg	PRV
1962	Olivier Harty de Pierrebourg	DVC
1967	Olivier Harty de Pierrebourg	DVC
1968	Olivier Harty de Pierrebourg	UDR
1973	Guy Beck	PS
1978	Jean-Claude Pasty	RPR
1981	André Lejeune	PS
1986	Proportional representation - no election by constituency	
1988	André Lejeune	PS
1993	Bernard de Froment	RPR
1997	Michel Vergnier	PS
2002	Michel Vergnier	PS
2007	Michel Vergnier	PS
2012	Michel Vergnier	PS
2017	Jean-Baptiste Moreau	LREM
2022	Catherine Couturier	LFI
2024	Bartolomé Lenoir	UXD

== Election results ==
=== 2024 ===
Candidate	Party	Alliance	First round			Second round		
Candidate	Party	Alliance	Votes	%	+/–	Votes	%	+/–
Bartolomé Lenoir	LR-RN	UXD	20,403	33.35	new	23,513	37.69	new
Catherine Couturier	LFI	NFP	14,359	23.47	-2.90	17,121	27.44	-24.00
Valérie Simonet	DVD		13,536	22.12	new	21,757	34.87	new
Jean-Baptiste Moreau	RE	ENS	10,670	17.44	-8.55			
Catherine Dumon	LO		958	1.57	+0.25			
Florence Verheyen Valade	DVC		763	1.25	new			
Ana Pinson	REC		493	0.81	-1.53			
Votes			61,182	100.00		62,391	100.00	
Valid votes			61,182	96.26	+0.19	62,391	96.58	+8.38
Blank votes			1,468	2.31	-0.38	1,425	2.21	-4.96
Null votes			907	1.43	+0.19	784	1.21	-3.42
Turnout			63,557	70.63	+16.23	64,600	71.82	+19.16
Abstentions			26,423	29.37	-16.23	25,353	28.18	-19.16
Registered voters			89,980			89,953		
Result		UXD GAIN FROM LFI						

=== 2022 ===
Legislative Election 2022: Creuse's constituency
Party	Candidate	Votes	%	±%
LFI (NUPÉS)	Catherine Couturier	12,545	26.37	-8.06
LREM (Ensemble)	Jean-Baptiste Moreau	12,368	25.99	-7.20
DVD	Jean Auclair	8,383	17.62	N/A
RN	Sylvie Bilde	8,118	17.06	+6.55
DVD	Catherine Defemme	2,429	5.10	N/A
REC	Grégory Giroix	1,115	2.34	N/A
DVE	Françoise Miran	1,061	2.23	N/A
Others	N/A	1,562	3.28	
Turnout		47,581	54.40	−0.73
2nd round result
LFI (NUPÉS)	Catherine Couturier	21,752	51.44	N/A
LREM (Ensemble)	Jean-Baptiste Moreau	20,532	48.56	−9.67
Turnout		42,284	52.66	+4.58
LFI gain from LREM				

=== 2017 ===
Candidate	Label	First round		Second round	
Candidate	Label	Votes	%	Votes	%
Jean-Baptiste Moreau	LREM	16,500	33.19	21,688	58.23
Jérémie Sauty	LR	8,818	17.74	15,558	41.77
Michel Vergnier	PS	7,715	15.52		
Laurence Pache	LFI	6,820	13.72		
Martial Maume	FN	5,225	10.51		
Claude Guerrier	PCF	1,406	2.83		
Pierrette Bidon	ECO	1,172	2.36		
Damien Demarigny	DLF	716	1.44		
Hervé Guillaumot	DVG	377	0.76		
Cécile Pinault	ECO	375	0.75		
Jean-Jacques Lacarrère	EXG	239	0.48		
Philippe Gombert	DIV	230	0.46		
Véronique Dubeau-Valade	DVD	125	0.25		
Michèle Mounier	DVD	0	0.00		
Votes		49,718	100.00	37,246	100.00
Valid votes		49,718	96.98	37,246	83.31
Blank votes		1,090	2.13	4,878	10.91
Null votes		460	0.90	2,586	5.78
Turnout		51,268	55.13	44,710	48.08
Abstentions		41,723	44.87	48,274	51.92
Registered voters		92,991		92,984	
Source: Ministry of the Interior

=== 2012 ===
Candidate	Label	First round		Second round	
Candidate	Label	Votes	%	Votes	%
Michel Vergnier	PS	27,235	44.41	35,464	57.55
Jean Auclair	UMP	20,726	33.8%	26,157	42.45%
Martial Maume	FN	4,692	7.65%		
Marie-Hélène Pouget-Chauvat	PG	4,600	7.5%		
Patrick Aïta	MoDem	1,510	2.46%		
Baptiste Francois	EELV	1,424	2.32		
Cédric Bessuand	DVD	447	.73%		
Félix Crespo	ECO	363	0.59		
Roger Gorizzutti	EXG	329	0.54		
Source: Ministry of the Interior

== Sources ==
- Official results of French elections from 1998: "Résultats électoraux officiels en France" (in French).
