= Montaigut-le-Blanc =

Montaigut-le-Blanc may refer to the following communes in France:

- Montaigut-le-Blanc, Creuse
- Montaigut-le-Blanc, Puy-de-Dôme
