= André Lejeune =

French politician

Senate of France
- In office 1998–2009
- Succeeded by: Renée Nicoux
- Constituency: Creuse

National Assembly of France
- In office 1981–1993
- Succeeded by: Bernard de Froment
- Constituency: Creuse's 1st

Personal details
- Born: 4 July 1935 (age 90) Ajain, Creuse, France
- Died: 9 September 2009 Sainte-Feyre
- Party: Socialist Party

André Lejeune (4 July 1935 – 9 September 2009) was a French politician and a member of both the National Assembly and then Senate of France.

In the National Assembly from 1981 to 1993, he represented Creuse's 1st constituency as a member of the Socialist Party until he was defeated by Bernard de Froment in the 1993 election. From 1998 to 2009, Lejeune represented Creuse in the Senate.

Following his death from lung cancer, he was replaced in the Senate by his suppleant, Renée Nicoux.
