= William Chervy =

French politician (1937–2021)

Mayor of Saint-Vaury
- In office 1971–2001

French Senator from Creuse
- In office 1981–1998

General Councillor of the Canton of Saint-Vaury
- In office 1970–2008

Personal details
- Born: 3 June 1937
- Died: 12 February 2021 (aged 83)
- Party: PS

William Chervy (3 June 1937 – 12 February 2021) was a French politician. He was a member of the Socialist Party and served as Mayor of Saint-Vaury, General Councillor of the Canton of Saint-Vaury, and Senator from Creuse.
