= Communauté d'agglomération du Grand Guéret =

Coordinates: 46.17°N 1.87°E

Grand Guéret
- Communauté d'agglomération
- Country: France
- Region: Nouvelle-Aquitaine
- Department: Creuse
- No. of communes: {{{nbcomm}}}
- Established: 1 January 2013

Government
  - President: Eric Correia
- Area: 480.6 km^{2} (185.6 sq mi)
- Population (2019): 28,527
  - Density: 59.36/km^{2} (153.7/sq mi)
- Website: www.agglo-grandgueret.fr

The Communauté d'agglomération du Grand Guéret was created on December 15, 1992 as communauté de communes de Guéret Saint-Vaury and is located in the Creuse département of the Nouvelle-Aquitaine region, central France. In January 2013 it absorbed three more communes, and became a communauté d'agglomération. In 2018 it absorbed three communes from the Communauté de communes Creuse Sud Ouest. Its area is 480.6 km^{2}. Its population was 28,527 in 2019, of which 12,734 in Guéret proper.

== Composition ==
The communauté d'agglomération consists of the following 25 communes:

- Ajain
- Anzême
- La Brionne
- Bussière-Dunoise
- La Chapelle-Taillefert
- Gartempe
- Glénic
- Guéret
- Jouillat
- Mazeirat
- Montaigut-le-Blanc
- Peyrabout
- Saint-Christophe
- Sainte-Feyre
- Saint-Éloi
- Saint-Fiel
- Saint-Laurent
- Saint-Léger-le-Guérétois
- Saint-Silvain-Montaigut
- Saint-Sulpice-le-Guérétois
- Saint-Vaury
- Saint-Victor-en-Marche
- Saint-Yrieix-les-Bois
- La Saunière
- Savennes

== See also ==
- Communes of the Creuse department
