= Saint-Silvain-Montaigut =

Commune in Nouvelle-Aquitaine, France

- Commune
- Location of Saint-Silvain-Montaigut
- Location within France Location within Nouvelle-Aquitaine
- Coordinates: 46°08′35″N 1°45′10″E
- Country: France
- Region: Nouvelle-Aquitaine
- Department: Creuse
- Arrondissement: Guéret
- Canton: Guéret-2
- Intercommunality: CA Grand Guéret

Government
  - Mayor (2020–2026): Michèle Elie
- Area^{1}: 9.55 km^{2} (3.69 sq mi)
- Elevation: 442 m (1,450 ft)
- Highest elevation: 492 m (1,614 ft)
- Lowest elevation: 380 m (1,250 ft)
- Population (2023): 194
  - Density: 20.3/km^{2} (52.6/sq mi)
- Time zone: UTC+01:00 (CET)
  - Summer (DST): UTC+02:00 (CEST)
- INSEE/Postal code: 23242 /23320
- ^{1} French Land Register data, which excludes lakes, ponds, glaciers > 1 km^{2} (0.386 sq mi or 247 acres) and river estuaries.

Saint-Silvain-Montaigut (French pronunciation: [sɛ̃ silvɛ̃ mɔ̃tɛɡy]; Limousin: Sant Sauve Mont Agut) is a commune in the Creuse department in central France.

== Population ==
Historical population
Year	Pop.	±% p.a.
1968	311	—
1975	257	−2.69%
1982	216	−2.45%
1990	198	−1.08%
1999	208	+0.55%
2007	189	−1.19%
2012	180	−0.97%
2017	213	+3.42%
2023	194	−1.55%
Source: INSEE

== See also ==
- Communes of the Creuse department
