= Anzême =

Commune in Nouvelle-Aquitaine, France

- Commune
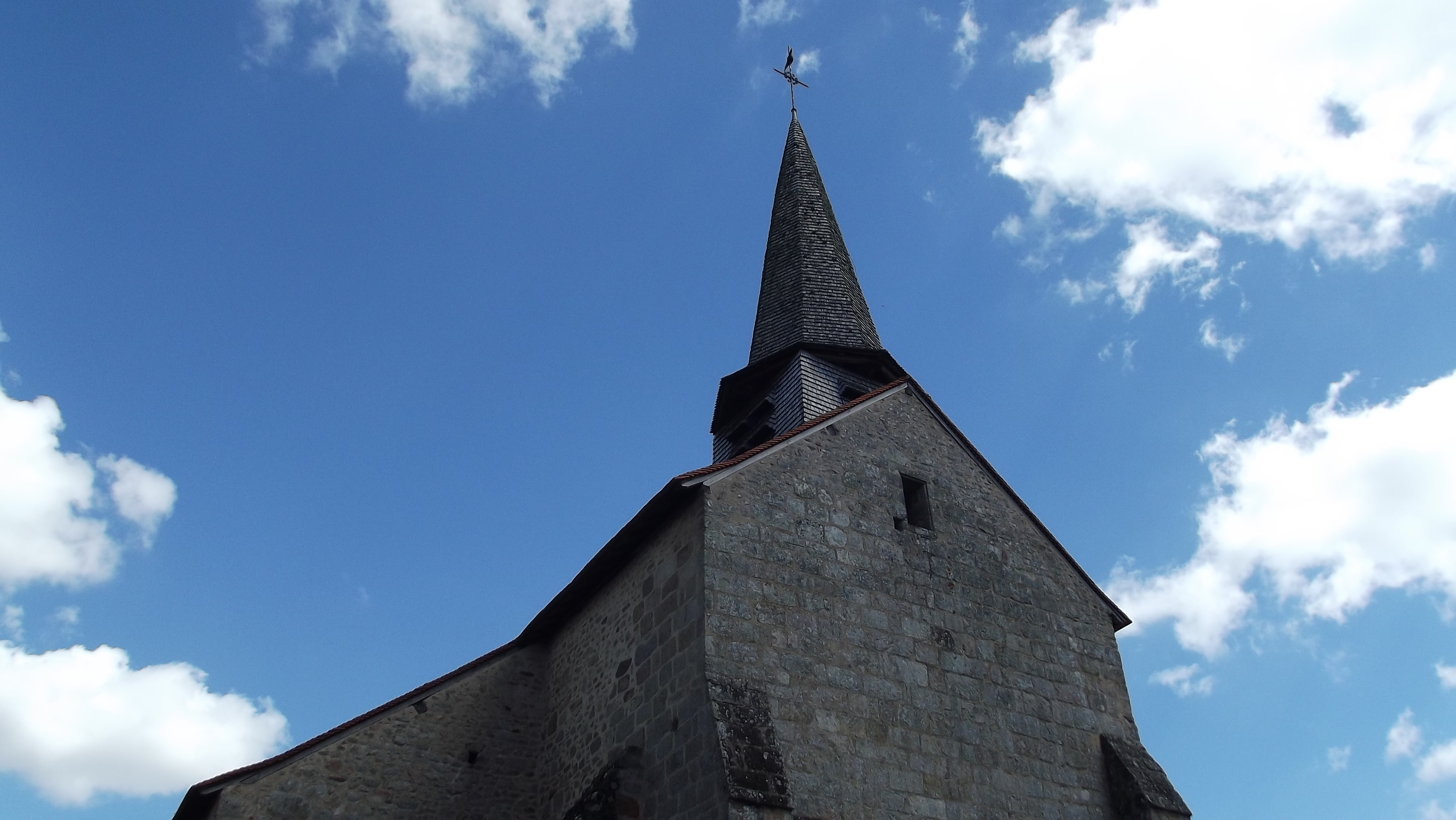
- The bell tower of the church in Anzême
- Location of Anzême
- Location within France Location within Nouvelle-Aquitaine
- Coordinates: 46°16′39″N 1°51′52″E
- Country: France
- Region: Nouvelle-Aquitaine
- Department: Creuse
- Arrondissement: Guéret
- Canton: Saint-Vaury
- Intercommunality: CA Grand Guéret

Government
  - Mayor (2020–2026): Viviane Dupeux
- Area^{1}: 29.50 km^{2} (11.39 sq mi)
- Elevation: 325 m (1,066 ft)
- Highest elevation: 441 m (1,447 ft)
- Lowest elevation: 254 m (833 ft)
- Population (2023): 551
  - Density: 18.7/km^{2} (48.4/sq mi)
- Time zone: UTC+01:00 (CET)
  - Summer (DST): UTC+02:00 (CEST)
- INSEE/Postal code: 23004 /23000
- ^{1} French Land Register data, which excludes lakes, ponds, glaciers > 1 km^{2} (0.386 sq mi or 247 acres) and river estuaries.

Anzême (French pronunciation: [ɑ̃zɛm]; Occitan: Anzesme) is a commune in the Creuse department in the Nouvelle-Aquitaine region in central France.

== Geography ==
An area of farming and quarrying, comprising the village and several hamlets situated by the banks of the Creuse, some 7 miles (11 km) north of Guéret, at the junction of the D14 and the D33.

== Population ==
Historical population
Year	Pop.	±% p.a.
1968	707	—
1975	601	−2.29%
1982	508	−2.37%
1990	519	+0.27%
1999	535	+0.34%
2007	562	+0.62%
2012	553	−0.32%
2017	578	+0.89%
2023	551	−0.79%
Source: INSEE

== Sights ==
- The church of St. Pierre, dating from the thirteenth century
- A stone bridge and stone cross, both dating from the fourteenth century
- The hydroelectric dams on the river

== See also ==
- Communes of the Creuse department
