= Bussière-Dunoise =

Commune in Nouvelle-Aquitaine, France

- Commune
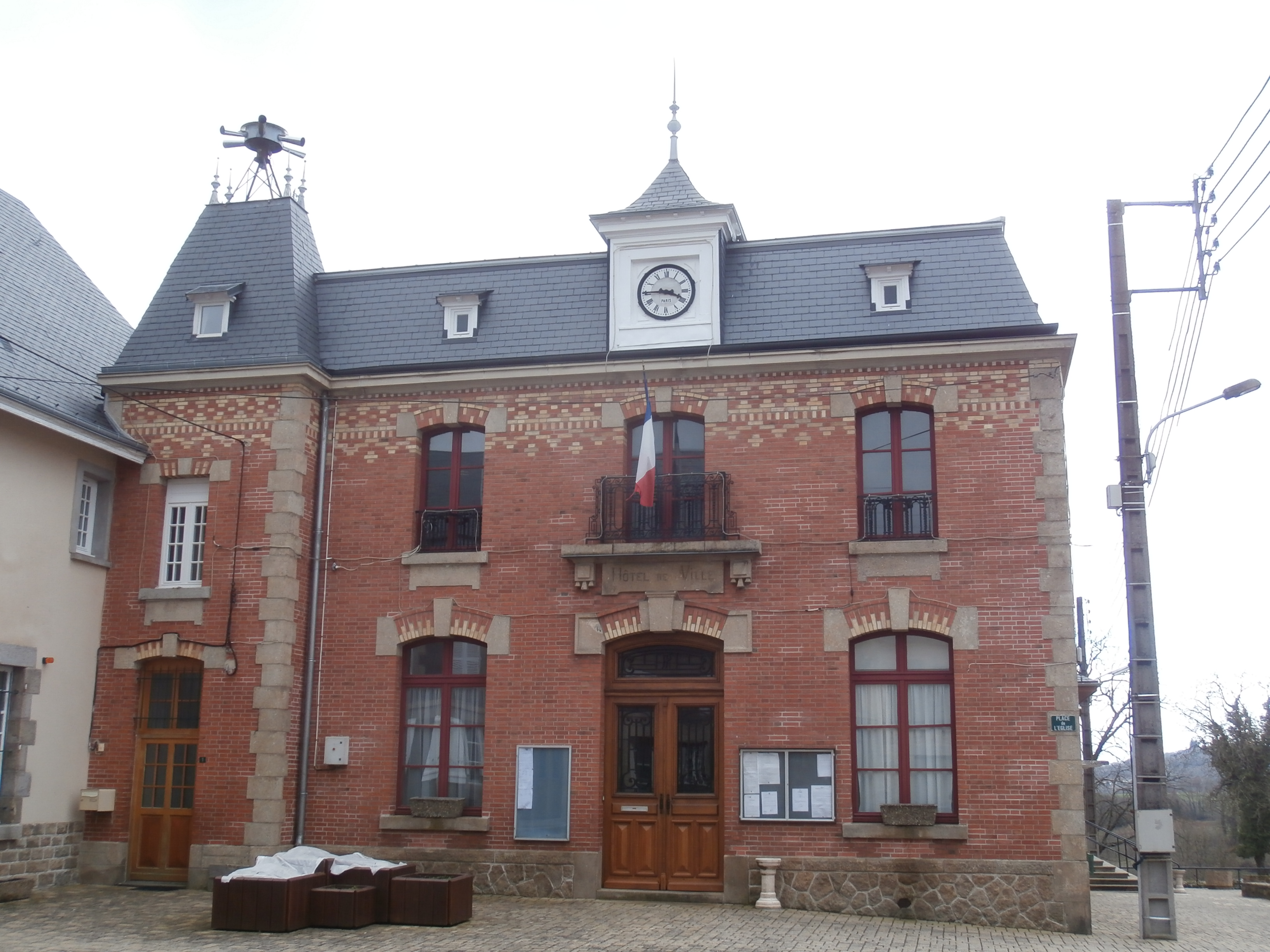
- The town hall in Bussière-Dunoise
- Location of Bussière-Dunoise
- Location within France Location within Nouvelle-Aquitaine
- Coordinates: 46°15′35″N 1°45′48″E
- Country: France
- Region: Nouvelle-Aquitaine
- Department: Creuse
- Arrondissement: Guéret
- Canton: Saint-Vaury
- Intercommunality: CA Grand Guéret

Government
  - Mayor (2020–2026): Christophe Lavaud
- Area^{1}: 41.13 km^{2} (15.88 sq mi)
- Elevation: 415 m (1,362 ft)
- Highest elevation: 615 m (2,018 ft)
- Lowest elevation: 324 m (1,063 ft)
- Population (2023): 1,040
  - Density: 25.3/km^{2} (65.5/sq mi)
- Time zone: UTC+01:00 (CET)
  - Summer (DST): UTC+02:00 (CEST)
- INSEE/Postal code: 23036 /23320
- ^{1} French Land Register data, which excludes lakes, ponds, glaciers > 1 km^{2} (0.386 sq mi or 247 acres) and river estuaries.

Bussière-Dunoise (French pronunciation: [bysjɛʁ dynwaz]; Occitan: Bussiera de Dun) is a commune in the Creuse department in the Nouvelle-Aquitaine region in central France.

== Geography ==
An area of forestry and farming comprising the village and several hamlets situated some 8 miles (13 km) northwest of Guéret, at the junction of the D14, D47 and the D22. Four small tributaries of the Creuse have their source within the commune.

== Population ==
Historical population
Year	Pop.	±% p.a.
1968	1,470	—
1975	1,329	−1.43%
1982	1,247	−0.91%
1990	1,139	−1.13%
1999	1,098	−0.41%
2007	1,105	+0.08%
2012	1,050	−1.02%
2017	1,038	−0.23%
2023	1,040	+0.03%
Source: INSEE

== Sights ==
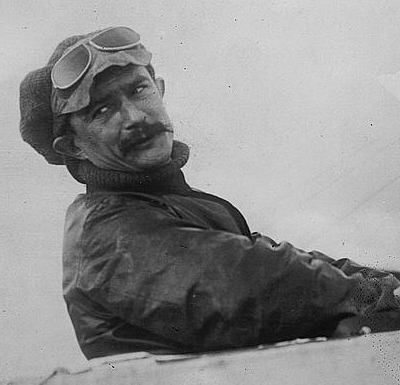
Jules Védrines

- The church of St. Symphorien, dating from the twelfth century.
- A memorial in stone, to French aviator, Jules Védrines, whose wife was born here.

== See also ==
- Communes of the Creuse department
