= Saint-Léger-le-Guérétois =

Commune in Nouvelle-Aquitaine, France

- Commune
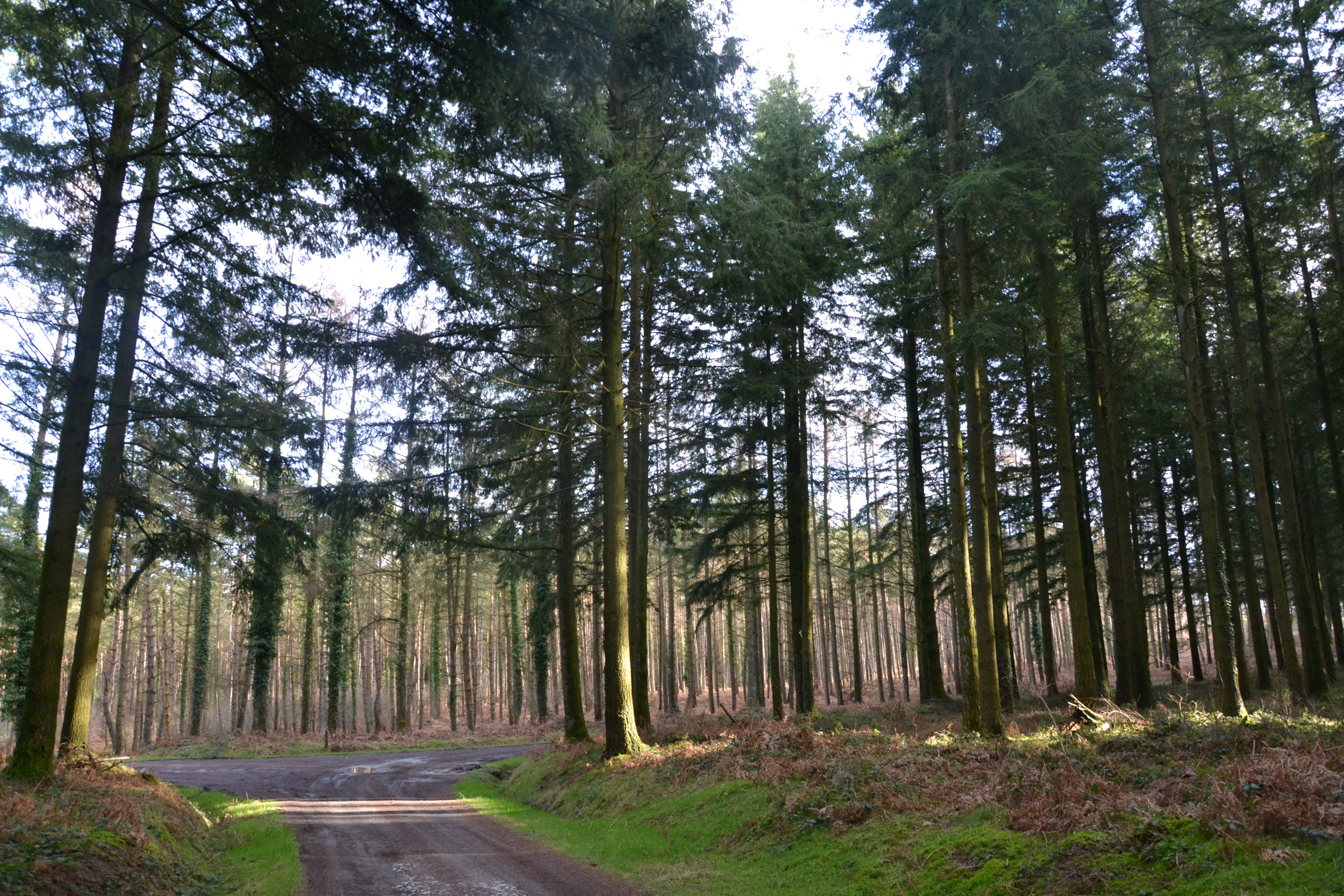
- The forest of Maupuy
- Location of Saint-Léger-le-Guérétois
- Location within France Location within Nouvelle-Aquitaine
- Coordinates: 46°09′07″N 1°48′52″E
- Country: France
- Region: Nouvelle-Aquitaine
- Department: Creuse
- Arrondissement: Guéret
- Canton: Saint-Vaury
- Intercommunality: CA Grand Guéret

Government
  - Mayor (2020–2026): Patrick Rougeot
- Area^{1}: 13.98 km^{2} (5.40 sq mi)
- Elevation: 522 m (1,713 ft)
- Highest elevation: 683 m (2,241 ft)
- Lowest elevation: 427 m (1,401 ft)
- Population (2023): 401
  - Density: 28.7/km^{2} (74.3/sq mi)
- Time zone: UTC+01:00 (CET)
  - Summer (DST): UTC+02:00 (CEST)
- INSEE/Postal code: 23208 /23000
- ^{1} French Land Register data, which excludes lakes, ponds, glaciers > 1 km^{2} (0.386 sq mi or 247 acres) and river estuaries.

Saint-Léger-le-Guérétois (French pronunciation: [sɛ̃ leʒe lə ɡeʁetwa]; Limousin: Sent Legèr (Garaitós)) is a commune in the Creuse department in central France.

== Population ==
Historical population
Year	Pop.	±% p.a.
1968	353	—
1975	342	−0.45%
1982	385	+1.71%
1990	446	+1.86%
1999	425	−0.53%
2007	410	−0.45%
2012	437	+1.28%
2017	429	−0.37%
2023	401	−1.12%
Source: INSEE

== See also ==
- Communes of the Creuse department
