= Mazeirat =

Commune in Nouvelle-Aquitaine, France

- Commune
- Location of Mazeirat
- Location within France Location within Nouvelle-Aquitaine
- Coordinates: 46°08′35″N 1°58′55″E
- Country: France
- Region: Nouvelle-Aquitaine
- Department: Creuse
- Arrondissement: Guéret
- Canton: Ahun
- Intercommunality: CA Grand Guéret

Government
  - Mayor (2024–2026): Jean-Luc Mechin
- Area^{1}: 7.8 km^{2} (3.0 sq mi)
- Elevation: 425 m (1,394 ft)
- Highest elevation: 459 m (1,506 ft)
- Lowest elevation: 330 m (1,080 ft)
- Population (2023): 120
  - Density: 15/km^{2} (40/sq mi)
- Time zone: UTC+01:00 (CET)
  - Summer (DST): UTC+02:00 (CEST)
- INSEE/Postal code: 23128 /23150
- ^{1} French Land Register data, which excludes lakes, ponds, glaciers > 1 km^{2} (0.386 sq mi or 247 acres) and river estuaries.

Mazeirat (French pronunciation: [mazeʁa]; Occitan: Masèirac) is a commune in the Creuse department in the Nouvelle-Aquitaine region in central France.

== Geography ==
A farming area comprising the village and a few hamlets situated in the valley of the Creuse, some 5 miles (8.0 km) southeast of Guéret at the junction of the D18 and the D89 roads.

== Population ==
Historical population
Year	Pop.	±% p.a.
1968	164	—
1975	162	−0.18%
1982	162	+0.00%
1990	142	−1.63%
1999	137	−0.40%
2007	138	+0.09%
2012	138	+0.00%
2017	130	−1.19%
2023	120	−1.33%
Source: INSEE

== Sights ==
- The church, dating from the twelfth century.
- The ruins of a castle at Mas de Ceydoux.

== See also ==
- Communes of the Creuse department
