= Saint-Laurent, Creuse =

Commune in Nouvelle-Aquitaine, France

Saint-Laurent
- Commune
- Location of Saint-Laurent
- Location within France Location within Nouvelle-Aquitaine
- Coordinates: 46°10′02″N 1°57′47″E
- Country: France
- Region: Nouvelle-Aquitaine
- Department: Creuse
- Arrondissement: Guéret
- Canton: Guéret-1
- Intercommunality: CA Grand Guéret

Government
  - Mayor (2020–2026): Alain Clédière
- Area^{1}: 12.93 km^{2} (4.99 sq mi)
- Elevation: 378 m (1,240 ft)
- Highest elevation: 470 m (1,540 ft)
- Lowest elevation: 310 m (1,020 ft)
- Population (2023): 670
  - Density: 52/km^{2} (130/sq mi)
- Time zone: UTC+01:00 (CET)
  - Summer (DST): UTC+02:00 (CEST)
- INSEE/Postal code: 23206 /23000
- ^{1} French Land Register data, which excludes lakes, ponds, glaciers > 1 km^{2} (0.386 sq mi or 247 acres) and river estuaries.

Saint-Laurent (French pronunciation: [sɛ̃ loʁɑ̃]; Occitan: Sent Laurenç) is a commune in the Creuse department in central France.

== Population ==
Historical population
Year	Pop.	±% p.a.
1968	462	—
1975	425	−1.19%
1982	493	+2.14%
1990	478	−0.39%
1999	539	+1.34%
2007	626	+1.89%
2012	668	+1.31%
2017	691	+0.68%
2023	670	−0.51%
Source: INSEE

== See also ==
- Communes of the Creuse department
