= La Brionne =

Commune in Nouvelle-Aquitaine, France

- Commune
- Location of La Brionne
- Location within France Location within Nouvelle-Aquitaine
- Coordinates: 46°10′10″N 1°47′16″E
- Country: France
- Region: Nouvelle-Aquitaine
- Department: Creuse
- Arrondissement: Guéret
- Canton: Saint-Vaury
- Intercommunality: CA Grand Guéret

Government
  - Mayor (2020–2026): Bernard Lefevre
- Area^{1}: 7.08 km^{2} (2.73 sq mi)
- Elevation: 500 m (1,600 ft)
- Highest elevation: 544 m (1,785 ft)
- Lowest elevation: 428 m (1,404 ft)
- Population (2023): 448
  - Density: 63.3/km^{2} (164/sq mi)
- Time zone: UTC+01:00 (CET)
  - Summer (DST): UTC+02:00 (CEST)
- INSEE/Postal code: 23033 /23000
- ^{1} French Land Register data, which excludes lakes, ponds, glaciers > 1 km^{2} (0.386 sq mi or 247 acres) and river estuaries.

La Brionne (French pronunciation: [la bʁijɔn]; Occitan: La Briòne) is a commune in the Creuse department in the Nouvelle-Aquitaine region in central France.

== Geography ==
A farming area comprising the village and several small hamlets situated some 4 miles (6.4 km) west of Guéret at the junction of the D4, D76 and the D914 roads.

== Population ==
Historical population
Year	Pop.	±% p.a.
1968	278	—
1975	280	+0.10%
1982	317	+1.79%
1990	348	+1.17%
1999	354	+0.19%
2007	374	+0.69%
2012	431	+2.88%
2017	440	+0.41%
2023	448	+0.30%
Source: INSEE

== Sights ==
- The church of St. Peter and St. Paul, dating from the fifteenth century.

== See also ==
- Communes of the Creuse department
