= Creuse's 2nd constituency =

Constituency of the French Fifth Republic

2nd constituency of the Creuse
- inline Constituency of the National Assembly of France
- Deputy: Jean Auclair; UMP
- Department: Creuse
- Cantons: Ahun, Aubusson, Auzances, Bellegarde-en-Marche, Boussac, Chambon-sur-Voueize, Châtelus-Malvaleix, Chénérailles, La Courtine, Crocq, Evaux-les-Bains, Felletin, Gentioux-Pigerolles, Jarnages, Pontarion, Royère-de-Vassivière, Saint-Sulpice-les-Champs

The 2nd constituency of the Creuse was a French legislative constituency in the Creuse département. It was abolished in the 2010 redistricting of French legislative constituencies with its last deputy being Jean Auclair. From the 2012 election onwards, the entire department was one constituency.

== Election results ==
=== 2007 ===
Legislative Election 2007: Creuse 2nd - 2nd round
Party	Candidate	Votes	%	±%
UMP	Jean Auclair	18,466	57.02	
MRC	Georges Sarre	13,920	42.98	
Turnout		34,107	69.68	
UMP hold		Swing		

== Sources ==
- Official results of French elections from 1998: "Résultats électoraux officiels en France" (in French).
