= Canton of Guéret-2 =

Coordinates: 46.17°N 1.87°E

The canton of Guéret-2 is an administrative division of the Creuse department, in central France. It was created at the French canton reorganisation which came into effect in March 2015. Its seat is in Guéret.

It consists of the following communes:

1. La Chapelle-Taillefert
2. Guéret (partly)
3. Montaigut-le-Blanc
4. Saint-Christophe
5. Saint-Éloi
6. Saint-Silvain-Montaigut
7. Saint-Victor-en-Marche
