= Saint-Sulpice-le-Guérétois =

Commune in Nouvelle-Aquitaine, France

- Commune
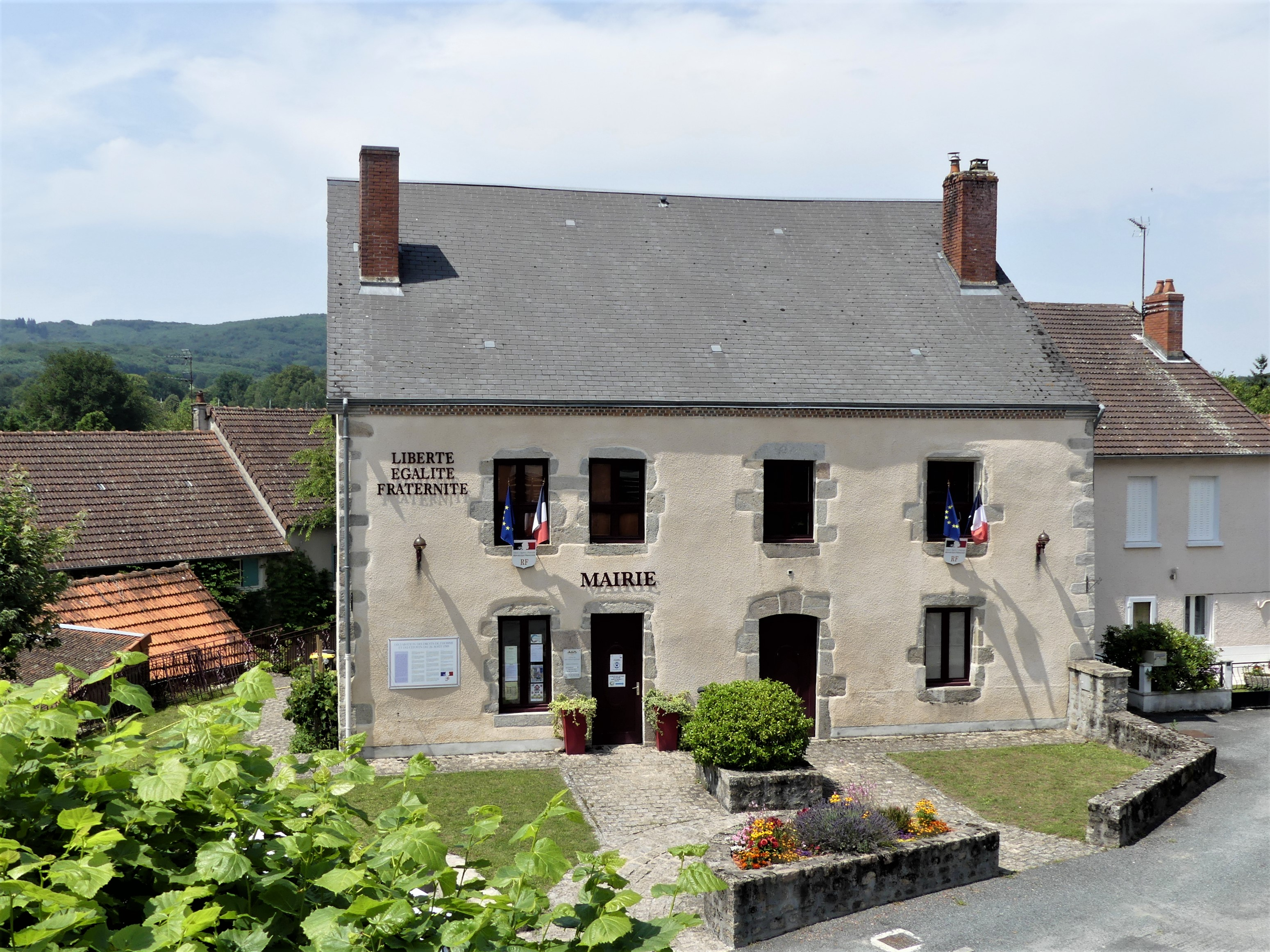
- Town hall
- Location of Saint-Sulpice-le-Guérétois
- Location within France Location within Nouvelle-Aquitaine
- Coordinates: 46°12′05″N 1°49′46″E
- Country: France
- Region: Nouvelle-Aquitaine
- Department: Creuse
- Arrondissement: Guéret
- Canton: Saint-Vaury
- Intercommunality: CA Grand Guéret

Government
  - Mayor (2020–2026): Eric Bodeau
- Area^{1}: 36.18 km^{2} (13.97 sq mi)
- Elevation: 397 m (1,302 ft)
- Highest elevation: 609 m (1,998 ft)
- Lowest elevation: 347 m (1,138 ft)
- Population (2023): 1,892
  - Density: 52.29/km^{2} (135.4/sq mi)
- Time zone: UTC+01:00 (CET)
  - Summer (DST): UTC+02:00 (CEST)
- INSEE/Postal code: 23245 /23000
- ^{1} French Land Register data, which excludes lakes, ponds, glaciers > 1 km^{2} (0.386 sq mi or 247 acres) and river estuaries.

Saint-Sulpice-le-Guérétois (French pronunciation: [sɛ̃ sylpis lə ɡeʁetwa]; Limousin: Sent Sepise (Garaitós)) is a commune in the Creuse department in central France.

== Population ==
Historical population
Year	Pop.	±% p.a.
1968	1,320	—
1975	1,239	−0.90%
1982	1,738	+4.95%
1990	1,879	+0.98%
1999	1,843	−0.21%
2007	1,998	+1.01%
2012	1,984	−0.14%
2017	1,949	−0.36%
2023	1,892	−0.49%
Source: INSEE

== See also ==
- Communes of the Creuse department
