= Gartempe, Creuse =

Commune in Nouvelle-Aquitaine, France

Gartempe
- Commune
- Location of Gartempe
- Location within France Location within Nouvelle-Aquitaine
- Coordinates: 46°09′03″N 1°44′19″E
- Country: France
- Region: Nouvelle-Aquitaine
- Department: Creuse
- Arrondissement: Guéret
- Canton: Saint-Vaury
- Intercommunality: CA Grand Guéret

Government
  - Mayor (2020–2026): Michel Pasty
- Area^{1}: 9.49 km^{2} (3.66 sq mi)
- Elevation: 436 m (1,430 ft)
- Highest elevation: 475 m (1,558 ft)
- Lowest elevation: 375 m (1,230 ft)
- Population (2023): 113
  - Density: 11.9/km^{2} (30.8/sq mi)
- Time zone: UTC+01:00 (CET)
  - Summer (DST): UTC+02:00 (CEST)
- INSEE/Postal code: 23088 /23320
- ^{1} French Land Register data, which excludes lakes, ponds, glaciers > 1 km^{2} (0.386 sq mi or 247 acres) and river estuaries.

Gartempe (French pronunciation: [ɡaʁtɑ̃p]; Limousin: Gartempa) is a commune in the Creuse department in the Nouvelle-Aquitaine region in central France.

== Geography ==
A small farming village of lakes, streams and forests situated some 8 miles (13 km) west of Guéret at the junction of the D96 and the D22 roads. The river Gartempe forms part of the commune's southern boundary.

== Population ==
Historical population
Year	Pop.	±% p.a.
1968	188	—
1975	165	−1.85%
1982	157	−0.71%
1990	124	−2.91%
1999	132	+0.70%
2007	140	+0.74%
2012	121	−2.87%
2017	123	+0.33%
2023	113	−1.40%
Source: INSEE

== Sights ==
- The church, dating from the sixteenth century.
- The chateau, dating from the seventeenth century.

== See also ==
- Communes of the Creuse department
