= La Saunière =

Commune in Nouvelle-Aquitaine, France

- Commune
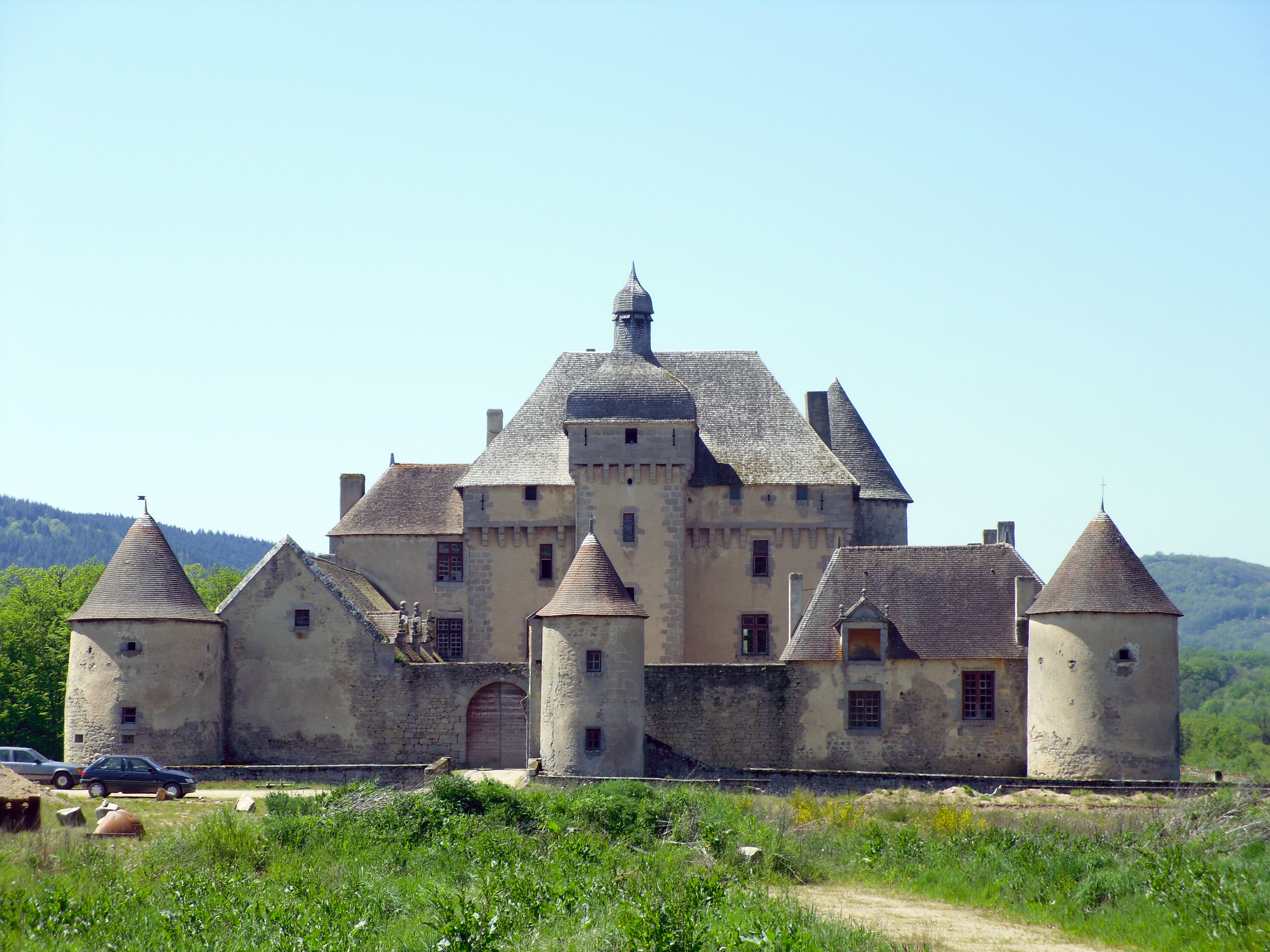
- Château du Théret

- Coat of arms
- Location of La Saunière
- Location within France Location within Nouvelle-Aquitaine
- Coordinates: 46°07′52″N 1°56′16″E
- Country: France
- Region: Nouvelle-Aquitaine
- Department: Creuse
- Arrondissement: Guéret
- Canton: Guéret-1
- Intercommunality: CA Grand Guéret

Government
  - Mayor (2020–2026): Annie Zapata
- Area^{1}: 7.5 km^{2} (2.9 sq mi)
- Elevation: 450 m (1,480 ft)
- Highest elevation: 560 m (1,840 ft)
- Lowest elevation: 376 m (1,234 ft)
- Population (2023): 663
  - Density: 88/km^{2} (230/sq mi)
- Time zone: UTC+01:00 (CET)
  - Summer (DST): UTC+02:00 (CEST)
- INSEE/Postal code: 23169 /23000
- ^{1} French Land Register data, which excludes lakes, ponds, glaciers > 1 km^{2} (0.386 sq mi or 247 acres) and river estuaries.

La Saunière (French pronunciation: [la sonjɛʁ]; Occitan: La Saunièra) is a commune in the Creuse department in the Nouvelle-Aquitaine region in central France.

== Geography ==
An area of farming and forestry comprising the village and a few small hamlets situated just 5 miles (8.0 km) southeast of Guéret at the junction of the D942 and the D17 roads.

== Population ==
Historical population
Year	Pop.	±% p.a.
1968	374	—
1975	332	−1.69%
1982	426	+3.63%
1990	532	+2.82%
1999	543	+0.23%
2007	624	+1.75%
2012	643	+0.60%
2017	607	−1.15%
2023	663	+1.48%
Source: INSEE

== Sights ==
- The church, dating from the twelfth century.
- The fifteenth-century château du Théret.

== Personalities ==
- René Boudard (1909–2004), historian, was born here.

== See also ==
- Communes of the Creuse department
