= Saint-Éloi, Creuse =

Commune in Nouvelle-Aquitaine, France

Saint-Éloi
- Commune
- Location of Saint-Éloi
- Location within France Location within Nouvelle-Aquitaine
- Coordinates: 46°04′28″N 1°50′01″E
- Country: France
- Region: Nouvelle-Aquitaine
- Department: Creuse
- Arrondissement: Guéret
- Canton: Guéret-2
- Intercommunality: CA Grand Guéret

Government
  - Mayor (2020–2026): Célia Boiron
- Area^{1}: 15.6 km^{2} (6.0 sq mi)
- Elevation: 580 m (1,900 ft)
- Highest elevation: 668 m (2,192 ft)
- Lowest elevation: 468 m (1,535 ft)
- Population (2023): 175
  - Density: 11.2/km^{2} (29.1/sq mi)
- Time zone: UTC+01:00 (CET)
  - Summer (DST): UTC+02:00 (CEST)
- INSEE/Postal code: 23191 /23000
- ^{1} French Land Register data, which excludes lakes, ponds, glaciers > 1 km^{2} (0.386 sq mi or 247 acres) and river estuaries.

Saint-Éloi (French pronunciation: [sɛ̃.t‿elwa]; Limousin: Sent Alec) is a commune in the Creuse department in central France.

== Population ==
Historical population
Year	Pop.	±% p.a.
1968	283	—
1975	226	−3.16%
1982	210	−1.04%
1990	175	−2.25%
1999	166	−0.58%
2007	202	+2.48%
2012	205	+0.30%
2017	225	+1.88%
2023	175	−4.10%
Source: INSEE

== See also ==
- Communes of the Creuse department
