= Michel Vergnier =

French politician

Member of the National Assembly for Creuse's constituency Creuse's 1st constituency (1997–2012)
- In office 12 June 1997 – 20 June 2017
- Preceded by: Bernard de Froment
- Succeeded by: Jean-Baptiste Moreau

Personal details
- Party: Socialist

Michel Vergnier (born 25 November 1946 in Ennery, Moselle) was a member of the National Assembly of France. He represented the Creuse department's only constituency until 2017, and is a member of the Socialiste, radical, citoyen et divers gauche.
