= La Chapelle-Taillefert =

Commune in Nouvelle-Aquitaine, France

- Commune
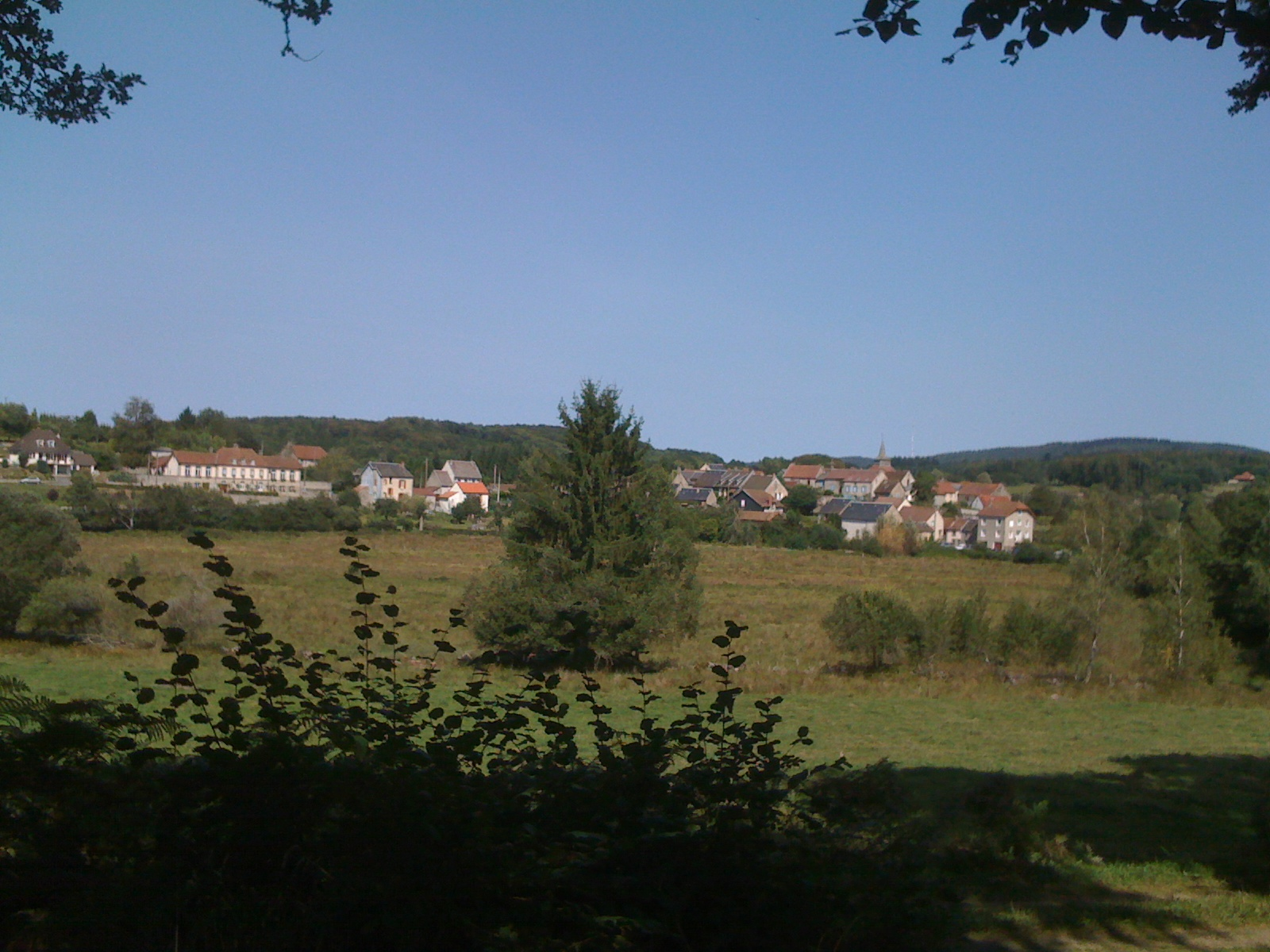
- A general view of La Chapelle-Taillefert
- Location of La Chapelle-Taillefert
- Location within France Location within Nouvelle-Aquitaine
- Coordinates: 46°06′05″N 1°50′25″E
- Country: France
- Region: Nouvelle-Aquitaine
- Department: Creuse
- Arrondissement: Guéret
- Canton: Guéret-2
- Intercommunality: CA Grand Guéret

Government
  - Mayor (2020–2026): Thierry Dubosclard
- Area^{1}: 14.11 km^{2} (5.45 sq mi)
- Elevation: 600 m (2,000 ft)
- Highest elevation: 690 m (2,260 ft)
- Lowest elevation: 462 m (1,516 ft)
- Population (2023): 448
  - Density: 31.8/km^{2} (82.2/sq mi)
- Time zone: UTC+01:00 (CET)
  - Summer (DST): UTC+02:00 (CEST)
- INSEE/Postal code: 23052 /23000
- ^{1} French Land Register data, which excludes lakes, ponds, glaciers > 1 km^{2} (0.386 sq mi or 247 acres) and river estuaries.

La Chapelle-Taillefert (French pronunciation: [la ʃapɛl tajfɛʁ]; Occitan: La Chapela Talhafer) is a commune in the Creuse department in the Nouvelle-Aquitaine region in central France.

== Geography ==
An area of farming and forestry comprising the village and a few small hamlets situated in the valley of the river Gartempe, some 5 miles (8.0 km) south of Guéret at the junction of the D 52, D 940 and the D 940^{A} roads.

== Population ==
Historical population
| Year | Pop. | ±% p.a. |
|---|---|---|
| 1968 | 319 | — |
| 1975 | 261 | −2.83% |
| 1982 | 257 | −0.22% |
| 1990 | 310 | +2.37% |
| 1999 | 353 | +1.45% |
| 2007 | 366 | +0.45% |
| 2012 | 389 | +1.23% |
| 2017 | 424 | +1.74% |
| 2023 | 448 | +0.92% |
Source: INSEE

== Sights ==
- The church, dating from the twelfth century.
- The fourteenth-century stone cross.
- Remains of a hypogeum.
- A menhir.

== Personalities ==
- Victor Lanoux, comedian and writer, born 1936, lived here during the Second World War.

== See also ==
- Communes of the Creuse department
