= Saint-Fiel =

Commune in Nouvelle-Aquitaine, France

- Commune
- Coat of arms
- Location of Saint-Fiel
- Location within France Location within Nouvelle-Aquitaine
- Coordinates: 46°12′51″N 1°53′46″E
- Country: France
- Region: Nouvelle-Aquitaine
- Department: Creuse
- Arrondissement: Guéret
- Canton: Saint-Vaury
- Intercommunality: CA Grand Guéret

Government
  - Mayor (2020–2026): François Barnaud
- Area^{1}: 16.72 km^{2} (6.46 sq mi)
- Elevation: 360 m (1,180 ft)
- Highest elevation: 396 m (1,299 ft)
- Lowest elevation: 297 m (974 ft)
- Population (2023): 1,087
  - Density: 65.01/km^{2} (168.4/sq mi)
- Time zone: UTC+01:00 (CET)
  - Summer (DST): UTC+02:00 (CEST)
- INSEE/Postal code: 23195 /23000
- ^{1} French Land Register data, which excludes lakes, ponds, glaciers > 1 km^{2} (0.386 sq mi or 247 acres) and river estuaries.

Saint-Fiel (French pronunciation: [sɛ̃ fjɛl]; Occitan: Sent Fiel) is a commune in the Creuse department in central France.

== Population ==
Historical population
| Year | Pop. | ±% p.a. |
|---|---|---|
| 1968 | 403 | — |
| 1975 | 492 | +2.89% |
| 1982 | 548 | +1.55% |
| 1990 | 709 | +3.27% |
| 1999 | 769 | +0.91% |
| 2007 | 917 | +2.22% |
| 2012 | 989 | +1.52% |
| 2017 | 1,036 | +0.93% |
| 2023 | 1,087 | +0.80% |
Source: INSEE

== See also ==
- Communes of the Creuse department
