= Sainte-Feyre =

Commune in Nouvelle-Aquitaine, France

- Commune
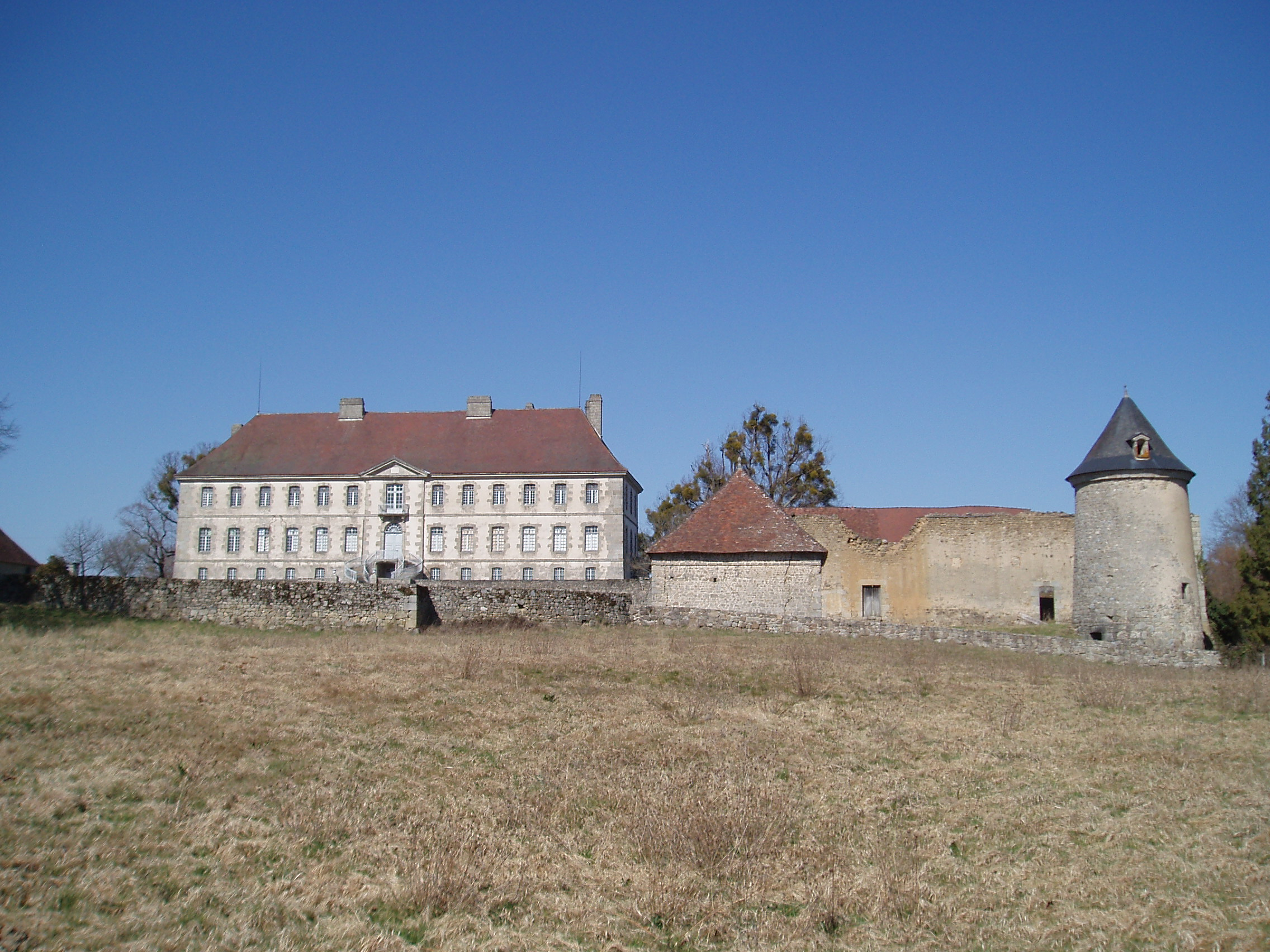
- Chateau
- Location of Sainte-Feyre
- Location within France Location within Nouvelle-Aquitaine
- Coordinates: 46°08′20″N 1°54′57″E
- Country: France
- Region: Nouvelle-Aquitaine
- Department: Creuse
- Arrondissement: Guéret
- Canton: Guéret-1
- Intercommunality: CA Grand Guéret

Government
  - Mayor (2020–2026): Franck Réjaud
- Area^{1}: 29.99 km^{2} (11.58 sq mi)
- Highest elevation: 662 m (2,172 ft)
- Lowest elevation: 310 m (1,020 ft)
- Population (2023): 2,566
  - Density: 85.56/km^{2} (221.6/sq mi)
- Time zone: UTC+01:00 (CET)
  - Summer (DST): UTC+02:00 (CEST)
- INSEE/Postal code: 23193 /23000
- ^{1} French Land Register data, which excludes lakes, ponds, glaciers > 1 km^{2} (0.386 sq mi or 247 acres) and river estuaries.

Sainte-Feyre (French pronunciation: [sɛ̃t fɛʁ]; Occitan: Sent Afeiran) is a commune in the Creuse department in central France.

== Population ==
Historical population

Year	Pop.	±% p.a.
1793	1,374	—
1800	1,394	+0.21%
1806	1,432	+0.45%
1821	1,492	+0.27%
1831	1,508	+0.11%
1836	1,567	+0.77%
1841	1,623	+0.70%
1846	1,709	+1.04%
1851	1,741	+0.37%
1856	1,734	−0.08%
1861	1,648	−1.01%
1866	1,728	+0.95%
1872	1,788	+0.57%
1876	1,761	−0.38%
1881	1,701	−0.69%
1886	1,761	+0.70%
1891	1,702	−0.68%
1896	1,619	−0.99%
1901	1,668	+0.60%

Year	Pop.	±% p.a.
1906	1,767	+1.16%
1911	1,743	−0.27%
1921	1,614	−0.77%
1926	1,617	+0.04%
1931	1,653	+0.44%
1936	1,686	+0.40%
1946	1,654	−0.19%
1954	1,703	+0.37%
1962	1,425	−2.20%
1968	1,457	+0.37%
1975	1,547	+0.86%
1982	1,889	+2.89%
1990	2,250	+2.21%
1999	2,250	+0.00%
2007	2,248	−0.01%
2012	2,395	+1.27%
2017	2,472	+0.63%
2023	2,566	+0.62%

Source: EHESS and INSEE (1968-2023)

== See also ==
- Communes of the Creuse department
