= Jouillat =

Commune in Nouvelle-Aquitaine, France

- Commune
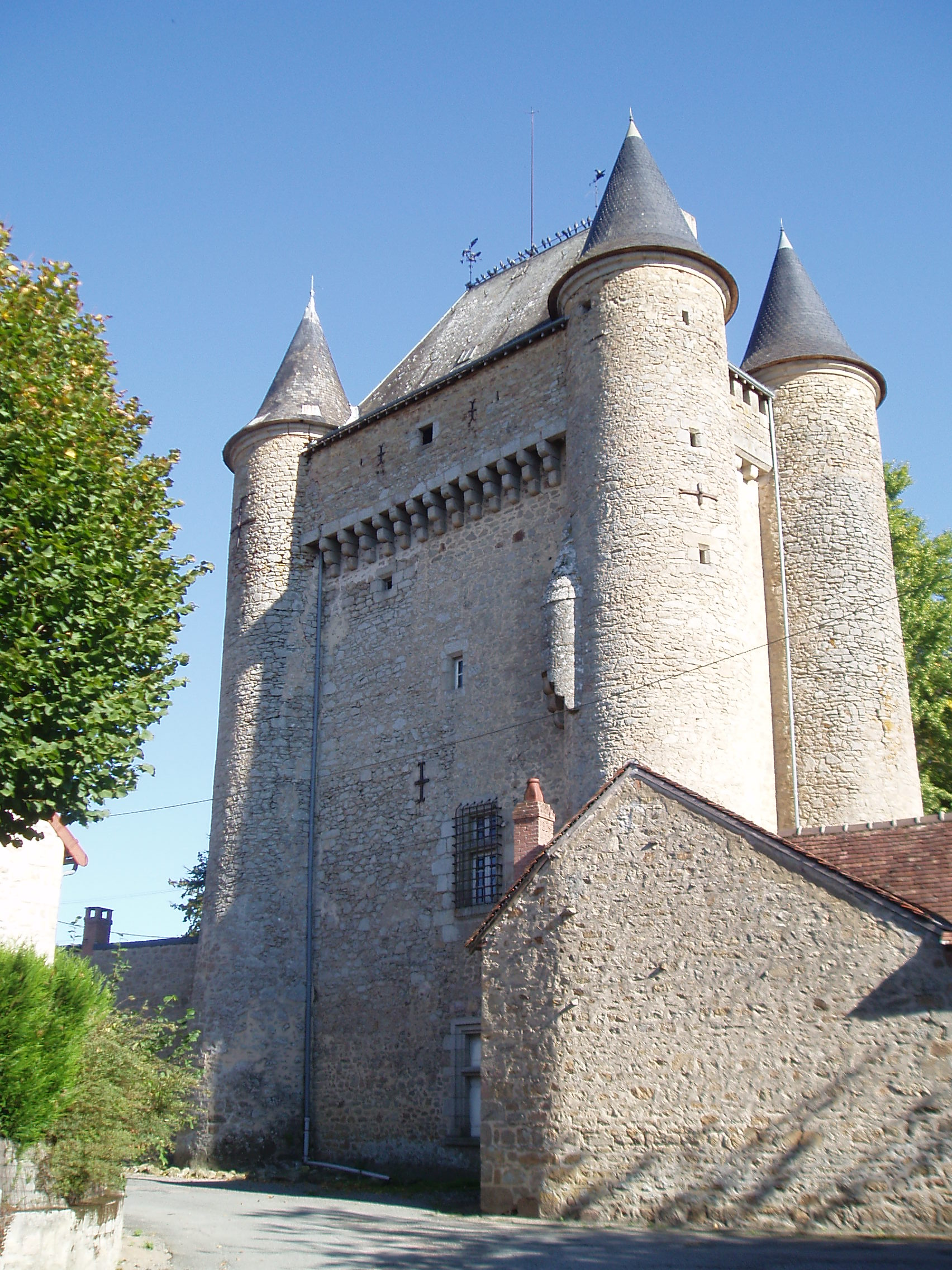
- The Château of Jouillat
- Location of Jouillat
- Location within France Location within Nouvelle-Aquitaine
- Coordinates: 46°15′29″N 1°56′13″E
- Country: France
- Region: Nouvelle-Aquitaine
- Department: Creuse
- Arrondissement: Guéret
- Canton: Saint-Vaury
- Intercommunality: CA Grand Guéret

Government
  - Mayor (2020–2026): Jean-Pierre Lécrivain
- Area^{1}: 22.44 km^{2} (8.66 sq mi)
- Elevation: 400 m (1,300 ft)
- Highest elevation: 546 m (1,791 ft)
- Lowest elevation: 283 m (928 ft)
- Population (2023): 387
  - Density: 17.2/km^{2} (44.7/sq mi)
- Time zone: UTC+01:00 (CET)
  - Summer (DST): UTC+02:00 (CEST)
- INSEE/Postal code: 23101 /23220
- ^{1} French Land Register data, which excludes lakes, ponds, glaciers > 1 km^{2} (0.386 sq mi or 247 acres) and river estuaries.

Jouillat (French pronunciation: [ʒuja]; Occitan: Jolhac) is a commune in the Creuse department in the Nouvelle-Aquitaine region in central France.

== Geography ==
A farming area comprising the village and several small hamlets situated in the valley of the Creuse, some 7 miles (11 km) northeast of Guéret at the junction of the D6, D16 and the D940 roads.

== Population ==
Historical population
Year	Pop.	±% p.a.
1968	463	—
1975	400	−2.07%
1982	395	−0.18%
1990	361	−1.12%
1999	402	+1.20%
2007	462	+1.75%
2012	443	−0.84%
2017	401	−1.97%
2023	387	−0.59%
Source: INSEE

== Sights ==
- The church of St. Martial, dating from the twelfth century.
- The fifteenth-century castle.
- The ruins of a fifteenth-century chateau at Bretouilly.

== See also ==
- Communes of the Creuse department
