= Saint-Vaury =

Commune in Nouvelle-Aquitaine, France

- Commune
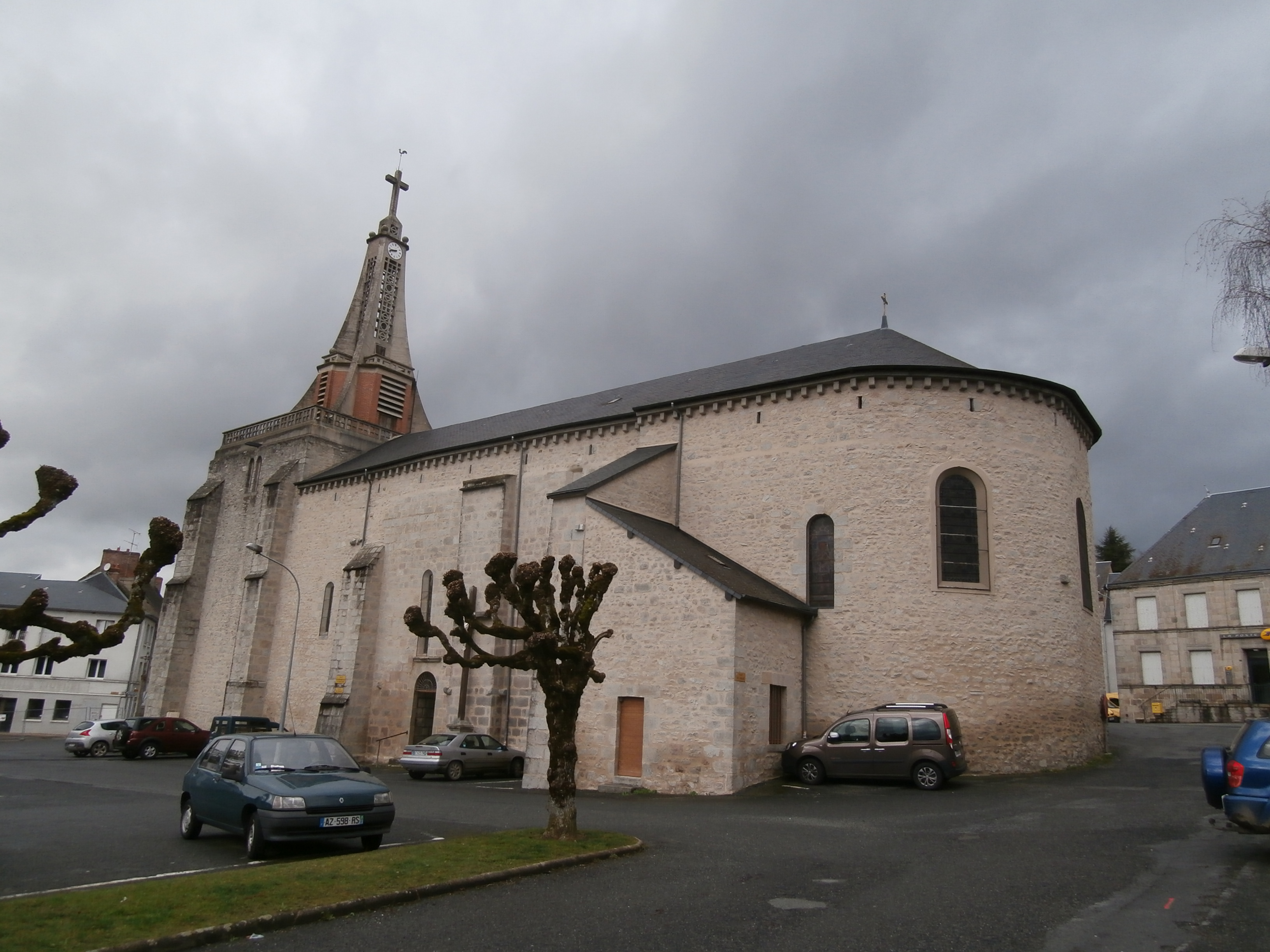
- The church in Saint-Vaury

- Coat of arms
- Location of Saint-Vaury
- Location within France Location within Nouvelle-Aquitaine
- Coordinates: 46°12′16″N 1°45′24″E
- Country: France
- Region: Nouvelle-Aquitaine
- Department: Creuse
- Arrondissement: Guéret
- Canton: Saint-Vaury
- Intercommunality: CA Grand Guéret

Government
  - Mayor (2020–2026): Philippe Bayol
- Area^{1}: 46.5 km^{2} (18.0 sq mi)
- Elevation: 458 m (1,503 ft)
- Highest elevation: 634 m (2,080 ft)
- Lowest elevation: 387 m (1,270 ft)
- Population (2023): 1,718
  - Density: 36.9/km^{2} (95.7/sq mi)
- Time zone: UTC+01:00 (CET)
  - Summer (DST): UTC+02:00 (CEST)
- INSEE/Postal code: 23247 /23320
- ^{1} French Land Register data, which excludes lakes, ponds, glaciers > 1 km^{2} (0.386 sq mi or 247 acres) and river estuaries.

Saint-Vaury (French pronunciation: [sɛ̃ voʁi]; Occitan: Sent Vauric) is a commune in the Creuse department in central France.

== Population ==
Historical population
Year	Pop.	±% p.a.
1968	2,359	—
1975	2,322	−0.23%
1982	2,265	−0.35%
1990	2,059	−1.18%
1999	1,829	−1.31%
2007	1,855	+0.18%
2012	1,799	−0.61%
2017	1,753	−0.52%
2023	1,718	−0.34%
Source: INSEE

== See also ==
- Communes of the Creuse department
