= Savennes, Creuse =

Commune in Nouvelle-Aquitaine, France

Savennes
- Commune
- Location of Savennes
- Location within France Location within Nouvelle-Aquitaine
- Coordinates: 46°06′23″N 1°53′20″E
- Country: France
- Region: Nouvelle-Aquitaine
- Department: Creuse
- Arrondissement: Guéret
- Canton: Guéret-1
- Intercommunality: CA Grand Guéret

Government
  - Mayor (2020–2026): Philippe Ponsard
- Area^{1}: 6.93 km^{2} (2.68 sq mi)
- Elevation: 500 m (1,600 ft)
- Highest elevation: 664 m (2,178 ft)
- Lowest elevation: 497 m (1,631 ft)
- Population (2023): 209
  - Density: 30.2/km^{2} (78.1/sq mi)
- Time zone: UTC+01:00 (CET)
  - Summer (DST): UTC+02:00 (CEST)
- INSEE/Postal code: 23170 /23000
- ^{1} French Land Register data, which excludes lakes, ponds, glaciers > 1 km^{2} (0.386 sq mi or 247 acres) and river estuaries.

Savennes (French pronunciation: [savɛn]; Occitan: Savenas) is a commune in the Creuse department in the Nouvelle-Aquitaine region in central France.

== Geography ==
An area of streams, lakes, forestry and farming, comprising the village and two hamlets situated some 5 miles (8.0 km) south of Guéret, at the junction of the D33 and the D52 roads.

== Population ==
Historical population
| Year | Pop. | ±% p.a. |
|---|---|---|
| 1968 | 151 | — |
| 1975 | 103 | −5.32% |
| 1982 | 176 | +7.95% |
| 1990 | 225 | +3.12% |
| 1999 | 212 | −0.66% |
| 2007 | 218 | +0.35% |
| 2012 | 218 | +0.00% |
| 2017 | 214 | −0.37% |
| 2023 | 209 | −0.39% |
Source: INSEE

== Sights ==
- A twentieth-century chapel.
- A restored public washhouse.

== See also ==
- Communes of the Creuse department
