= Renée Nicoux =

French politician

Senate of France
- In office 10 September 2009 – 30 September 2014
- Preceded by: André Lejeune
- Constituency: Creuse

Mayor of Felletin

Président of the Pays Sud Creusois

Personal details
- Born: 26 March 1951 (age 75)
- Party: Socialist Party
- Occupation: English Professor, Vice-Head of High School

Renée Nicoux (born 26 March 1951) is a French politician and a former member of the Senate of France.

She was the suppleant of André Lejeune, and took over from him in the Senate when he died on 10 September 2009.

She graduated from Paris 8 Vincennes, completing a superior degree in English. She then became a civil servant at the local library of Guéret. She then exercised as a professor in different high schools in Creuse and finished her career as vice-head of the Lycée Pierre Bourdan, Guéret.

Elected mayor of Felletin and seating at the Conseil Régional of the Limousin region as its vice president, her career as a politician just started. She got elected vice-senator and replaced the Senator André Lejeune when he died in 2009.

Today she no longer is seating at the Conseil Régional of the Limousin region since she decided not to run for her re-election. She dedicates her time to her office as mayor of Felletin or as a senator of the department of Creuse.

As such, she defends the culture that can be found in Creuse, and tries to emphasize the special character of this territory so as to develop tourism. In her view, such a development should, however, not be hurtful to the environment and future generations. Therefore, she advocates renewable energy, especially the biomass.
