= Jean-Baptiste Moreau (politician) =

French politician (born 1977)

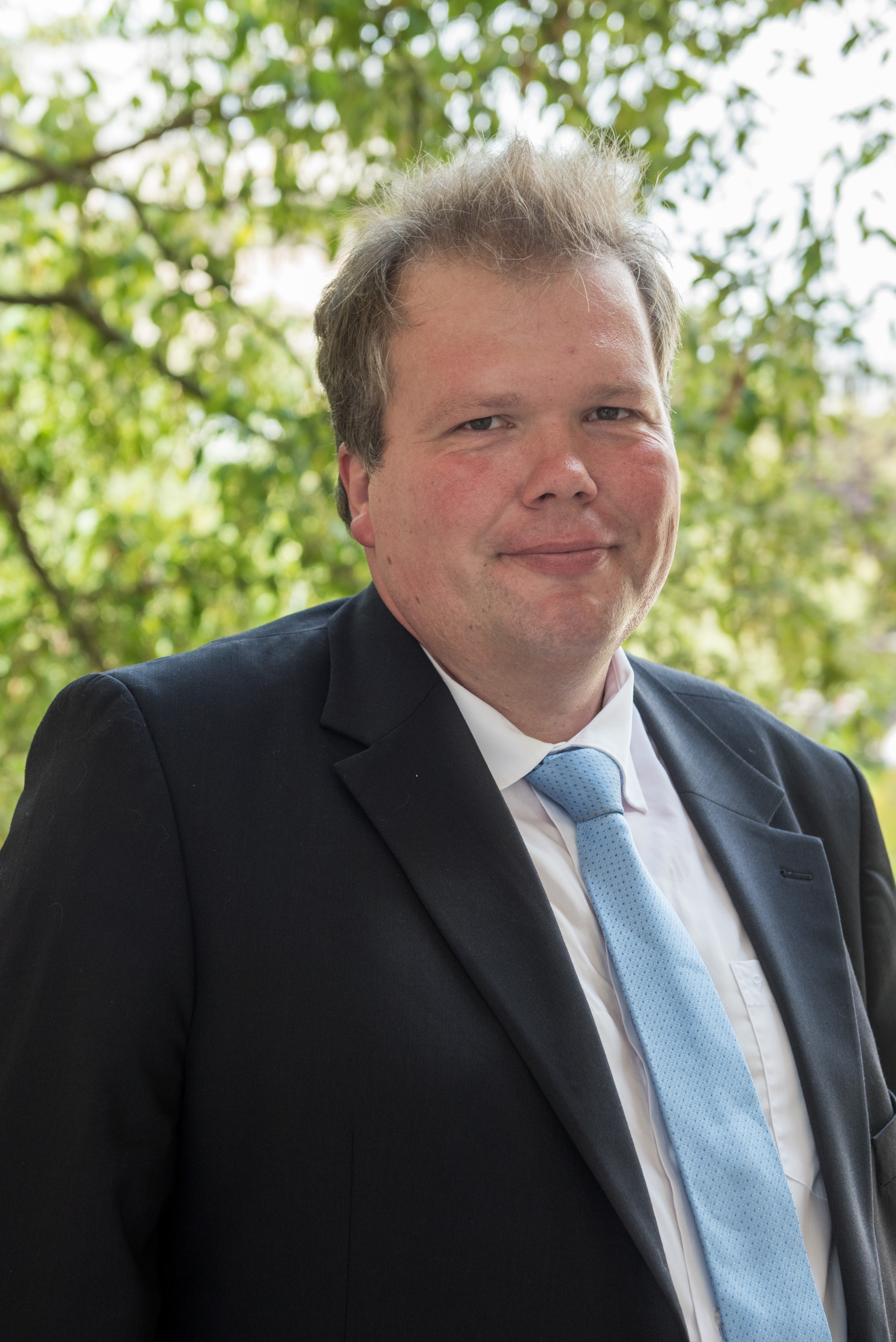

Member of the National Assembly for Creuse
- In office 21 June 2017 – 21 June 2022
- Preceded by: Michel Vergnier
- Succeeded by: Catherine Couturier

Personal details
- Born: 14 February 1977 (age 49) Guéret, France
- Party: La République En Marche!
- Profession: Farmer

Jean-Baptiste Moreau (French pronunciation: [ʒɑ̃ batist mɔʁo]; born 14 February 1977) is a French cattle farmer and politician of La République En Marche! (LREM) who was a member of the French National Assembly from the 2017 elections to the 2022 elections, representing the department of Creuse's sole constituency.

== Political career ==
In parliament, Moreau served as a spokesperson for the LREM parliamentary group. He is a member of the Committee on Economic Affairs and the Committee on European Affairs. In addition to his committee assignments, he chaired the French-Saudi Parliamentary Friendship Group.

He was defeated at the 2022 election by Catherine Couturier of La France Insoumise.

== Political positions ==
In July 2019, Moreau voted in favor of the French ratification of the European Union’s Comprehensive Economic and Trade Agreement (CETA) with Canada. In mid-2019, French anti-government protesters put up a large poster of Moreau with the word “Wanted” on it outside a local government building in Creuse, in an effort to protest against his support of CETA.

In September 2020, Moreau publicly endorsed Aurore Bergé in an internal vote to succeed Gilles Le Gendre as chair of the LREM parliamentary group; however, the role went to Christophe Castaner.

== See also ==
- 2017 French legislative election
