= Bartolomé Lenoir =

French politician (born 1991)

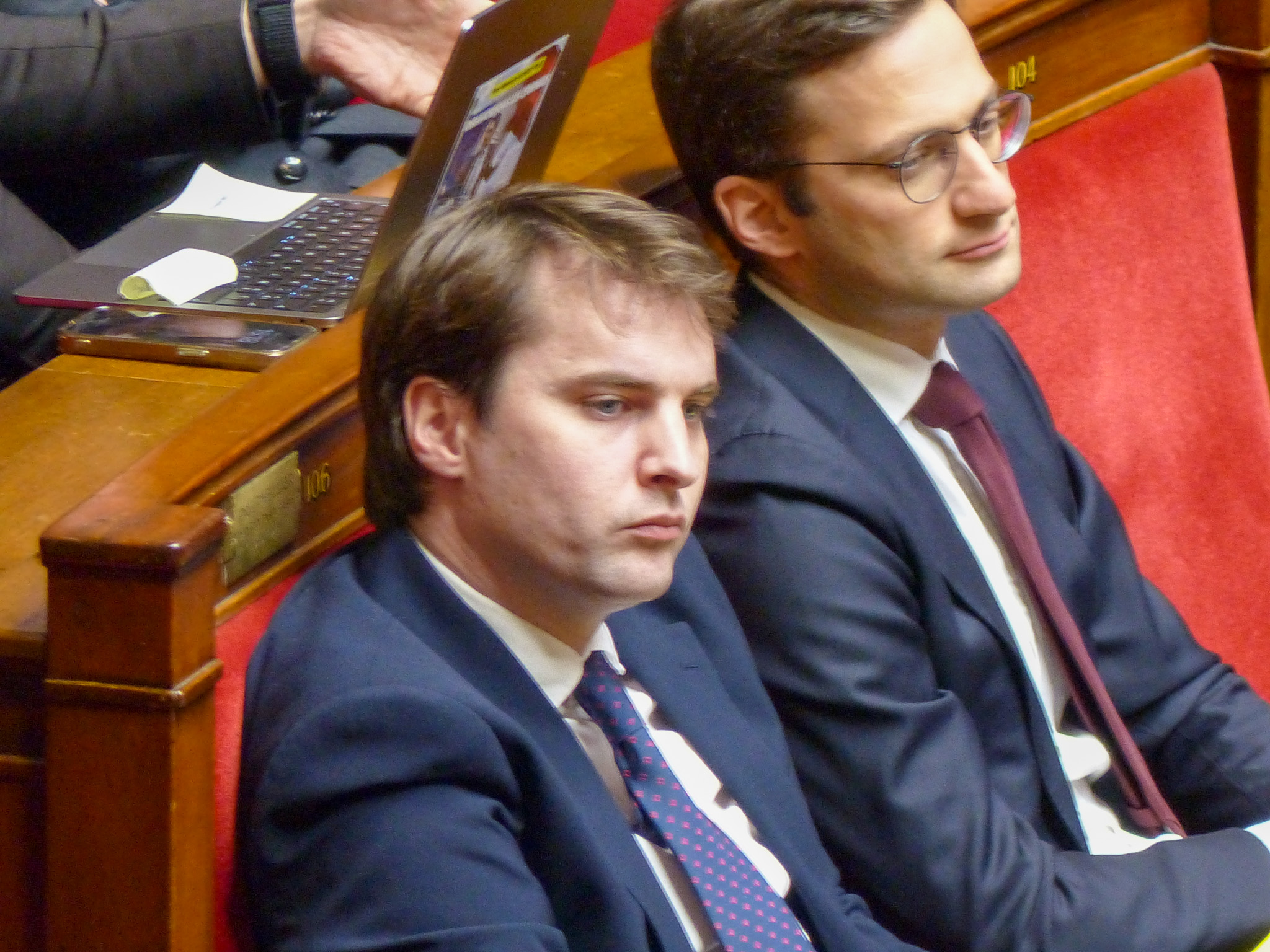
- Lenoir in 2026

Member of the National Assembly for Creuse's constituency
- Incumbent
- Assumed office 8 July 2024
- Preceded by: Catherine Couturier

Personal details
- Born: 4 September 1991 (age 35) Angers, France
- Party: Union of the Right for the Republic (2024–present)
- Other political affiliations: The Republicans (until 2024)
- Education: Paris-Panthéon-Assas University; University of Ljubljana; Paris Dauphine University; Emlyon Business School; East China Normal University

Bartolomé Lenoir (French pronunciation: [baʁtɔlɔme lənwaʁ]; born 4 September 1991) is a French politician of the Union of the Right for the Republic (UDR). He has represented the Creuse department in the National Assembly since 2024.
