= Saint-Victor-en-Marche =

Commune in Nouvelle-Aquitaine, France

- Commune
- Location of Saint-Victor-en-Marche
- Location within France Location within Nouvelle-Aquitaine
- Coordinates: 46°07′10″N 1°48′53″E
- Country: France
- Region: Nouvelle-Aquitaine
- Department: Creuse
- Arrondissement: Guéret
- Canton: Guéret-2
- Intercommunality: CA Grand Guéret

Government
  - Mayor (2020–2026): Xavier Bidan
- Area^{1}: 16.62 km^{2} (6.42 sq mi)
- Elevation: 479 m (1,572 ft)
- Highest elevation: 580 m (1,900 ft)
- Lowest elevation: 389 m (1,276 ft)
- Population (2023): 359
  - Density: 21.6/km^{2} (55.9/sq mi)
- Time zone: UTC+01:00 (CET)
  - Summer (DST): UTC+02:00 (CEST)
- INSEE/Postal code: 23248 /23000
- ^{1} French Land Register data, which excludes lakes, ponds, glaciers > 1 km^{2} (0.386 sq mi or 247 acres) and river estuaries.

Saint-Victor-en-Marche (French pronunciation: [sɛ̃ viktɔʁ ɑ̃ maʁʃ], literally Saint-Victor in Marche; Limousin: Sent Victòr) is a commune in the Creuse department in central France.

== Population ==
Historical population
Year	Pop.	±% p.a.
1968	410	—
1975	343	−2.52%
1982	322	−0.90%
1990	297	−1.01%
1999	368	+2.41%
2007	357	−0.38%
2012	363	+0.33%
2017	376	+0.71%
2023	359	−0.77%
Source: INSEE

== See also ==
- Communes of the Creuse department
