= Jean Auclair =

French politician

Member of the National Assembly of France for 2nd Constituency of Creuse
- In office 1993 French legislative election – 2012
- Preceded by: Gaston Rimareix
- Succeeded by: Constituency abolished

Mayor of Cressat
- Incumbent
- Assumed office 27 March 1977

General councillor of Creuse
- Incumbent
- Assumed office 10 September 1989

Personal details
- Born: 3 May 1946 (age 79) Vigeville, Creuse France
- Party: UMP
- Committees: Economic, Environmental and Regional Planning Committee

Jean Auclair (born 3 May 1946 in Vigeville) was a member of the National Assembly of France from 1989 to 2012. He represented the Creuse's 2nd constituency until its abolition and was a member of the Union for a Popular Movement.
