= Léon Renard =

French politician (1836–1916)

Député of the 1st circonsription of Valenciennes
- In office 6 October 1889 – 14 October 1893
- Succeeded by: Émile Weill-Mallez (Republican Union)

Député for Nord (proportional majority by département)
- In office 4 October 1885 – 11 November 1889
- Preceded by: Alfred Girard (Republican Union)
- Succeeded by: Himself

Député of the 2nd circonscription of Valenciennes
- In office 20 February 1876 – 1 January 1878
- Preceded by: New role
- Succeeded by: Alfred Girard (Republican Union)

Léon Renard, born 16 March 1836 in Valenciennes (Nord), died 5 January 1916 in the same town, was a French politician.

== Biography ==
The son of a general agent in the mines of Anzin, he graduated from the école centrale des arts et manufactures in 1857. He worked in the glassworks at Fresnes and became president of the union of master glassmakers of the North of France. The administrator of the forges in Maubeuge, and representative for the mines of Anzin, he became councillor for the arrondissement in 1851 and judge of commercial tribunals in 1867. He was elected to député of the 2nd circonscription of Valenciennes from 1876 to 1878, representing the Bonapartist group Appel au peuple, and for the 1st circonscription of Valenciennes 1889 to 1893, representing the Union des droites.

During the debates on the creation of a minor delegate, he proposed multiple amendments to reduce the scope of the text, including introducing a balance against the limits placed on mine owners.

== Sources ==
- "Léon Renard", in Adolphe Robert and Gaston Cougny, Dictionnaire des parlementaires français (1789–1891), Bourloton, Paris, 1889 Edition details Wikisource
