= Canton of Saint-Vaury =

Coordinates: 46°11′12″N 1°46′57″E

Saint-Vaury
- Canton
- Interactive map of Saint-Vaury
- Country: France
- Region: Nouvelle-Aquitaine
- Department: Creuse
- No. of communes: {{{nbcomm}}}
- Area: 283.76 km^{2} (109.56 sq mi)
- Population (2023): 9,281
  - Density: 32.71/km^{2} (84.71/sq mi)
- INSEE code: 23 14

The Canton of Saint-Vaury is a canton situated in the Creuse département and in the Nouvelle-Aquitaine region of central France.

== Geography ==
An area of farming, forestry and lakes in the arrondissement of Guéret, centred on the town of Saint-Vaury. The altitude varies from 254m (Anzême) to 683m (Saint-Léger-le-Guérétois) with an average altitude of 422m.

== Population ==
Historical population
Year	Pop.	±% p.a.
2013	9,529	—
2018	9,484	−0.09%
Source: INSEE

== Composition ==
At the French canton reorganisation which came into effect in March 2015, the canton was expanded from 9 to 11 communes:

- Ajain
- Anzême
- La Brionne
- Bussière-Dunoise
- Gartempe
- Glénic
- Jouillat
- Saint-Fiel
- Saint-Léger-le-Guérétois
- Saint-Sulpice-le-Guérétois
- Saint-Vaury

== See also ==
- Arrondissements of the Creuse department
- Cantons of the Creuse department
- Communes of the Creuse department
