= Catherine Couturier =

French politician

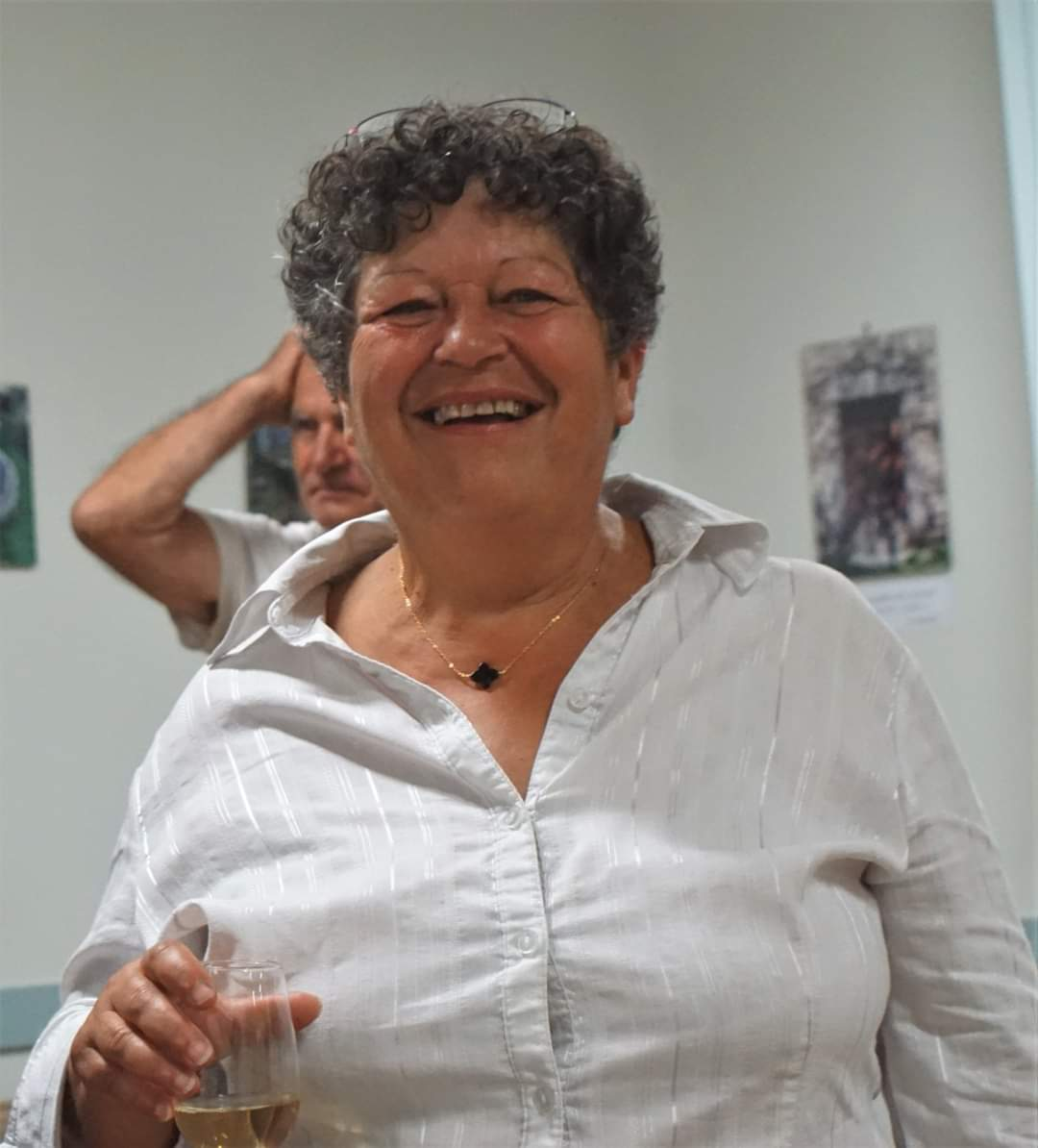

Member of the National Assembly for Creuse
- In office 22 June 2022 – 9 June 2024
- Preceded by: Jean-Baptiste Moreau
- Succeeded by: Bartolomé Lenoir

Personal details
- Born: 27 February 1959 (age 67) Guéret, France
- Party: La France Insoumise

Catherine Couturier is a French politician. A member of La France Insoumise, she served as National Assembly deputy for Creuse's constituency from 2022 to 2024.

== Biography ==
Couturier was born on 27 February 1959 in Guéret, in Nouvelle-Aquitaine. She completed her tertiary education in Limoges. She later worked as a technician for France Télécom S.A., and was active in the General Confederation of Labour.

She was a member of the French Communist Party until 2016, when she left to join the newly-founded left-wing party La France Insoumise, led by Jean-Luc Mélenchon. From 2001 to 2020, she served as a municipal councillor in Limay, spending several years as deputy mayor.

In the 2022 French legislative election, she was the La France Insoumise candidate for Creuse's sole constituency, as part of the New Ecological and Social People's Union (NUPES) coalition. She finished with 26,37% of the vote in the first round of the elections, qualifying for the second round. In the second round, she finished with 51,44% of the vote, defeating La République En Marche! incumbent Jean-Baptiste Moreau.

She currently sits on the Sustainable Development, Spatial and Regional Planning Committee.
