= Creuse's 1st constituency =

Former French legislative constituency

Creuse in France.

The 1st constituency of the Creuse (French: Première circonscription de la Creuse) was a French legislative constituency in the Creuse département. It was abolished in the 2010 redistricting of French legislative constituencies, its last deputy was Michel Vergnier. From the 2012 election onwards, the entire department was one constituency.

== Election results ==
=== 2007 ===
Legislative Election 2007: Creuse 1st - 2nd round
Party	Candidate	Votes	%	±%
PS	Michel Vergnier	19,432	60.52	
UMP	Brigitte Jammot	12,675	39.48	
Turnout		33,187	65.20	
PS hold		Swing		
