= Saint-Christophe, Creuse =

Commune in Nouvelle-Aquitaine, France

Saint-Christophe
- Commune
- Location of Saint-Christophe
- Location within France Location within Nouvelle-Aquitaine
- Coordinates: 46°06′11″N 1°51′47″E
- Country: France
- Region: Nouvelle-Aquitaine
- Department: Creuse
- Arrondissement: Guéret
- Canton: Guéret-2
- Intercommunality: CA Grand Guéret

Government
  - Mayor (2020–2026): Jacques Velghe
- Area^{1}: 7.79 km^{2} (3.01 sq mi)
- Elevation: 500 m (1,600 ft)
- Highest elevation: 621 m (2,037 ft)
- Lowest elevation: 480 m (1,570 ft)
- Population (2023): 148
  - Density: 19.0/km^{2} (49.2/sq mi)
- Time zone: UTC+01:00 (CET)
  - Summer (DST): UTC+02:00 (CEST)
- INSEE/Postal code: 23186 /23000
- ^{1} French Land Register data, which excludes lakes, ponds, glaciers > 1 km^{2} (0.386 sq mi or 247 acres) and river estuaries.

Saint-Christophe (French pronunciation: [sɛ̃ kʁistɔf]; Limousin: Sent Cristòu) is a commune in the Creuse department in central France.

== Population ==
Historical population
Year	Pop.	±% p.a.
1968	145	—
1975	117	−3.02%
1982	118	+0.12%
1990	133	+1.51%
1999	132	−0.08%
2007	126	−0.58%
2012	128	+0.32%
2017	155	+3.90%
2023	148	−0.77%
Source: INSEE

== See also ==
- Communes of the Creuse department
