= Glénic =

Commune in Nouvelle-Aquitaine, France

- Commune
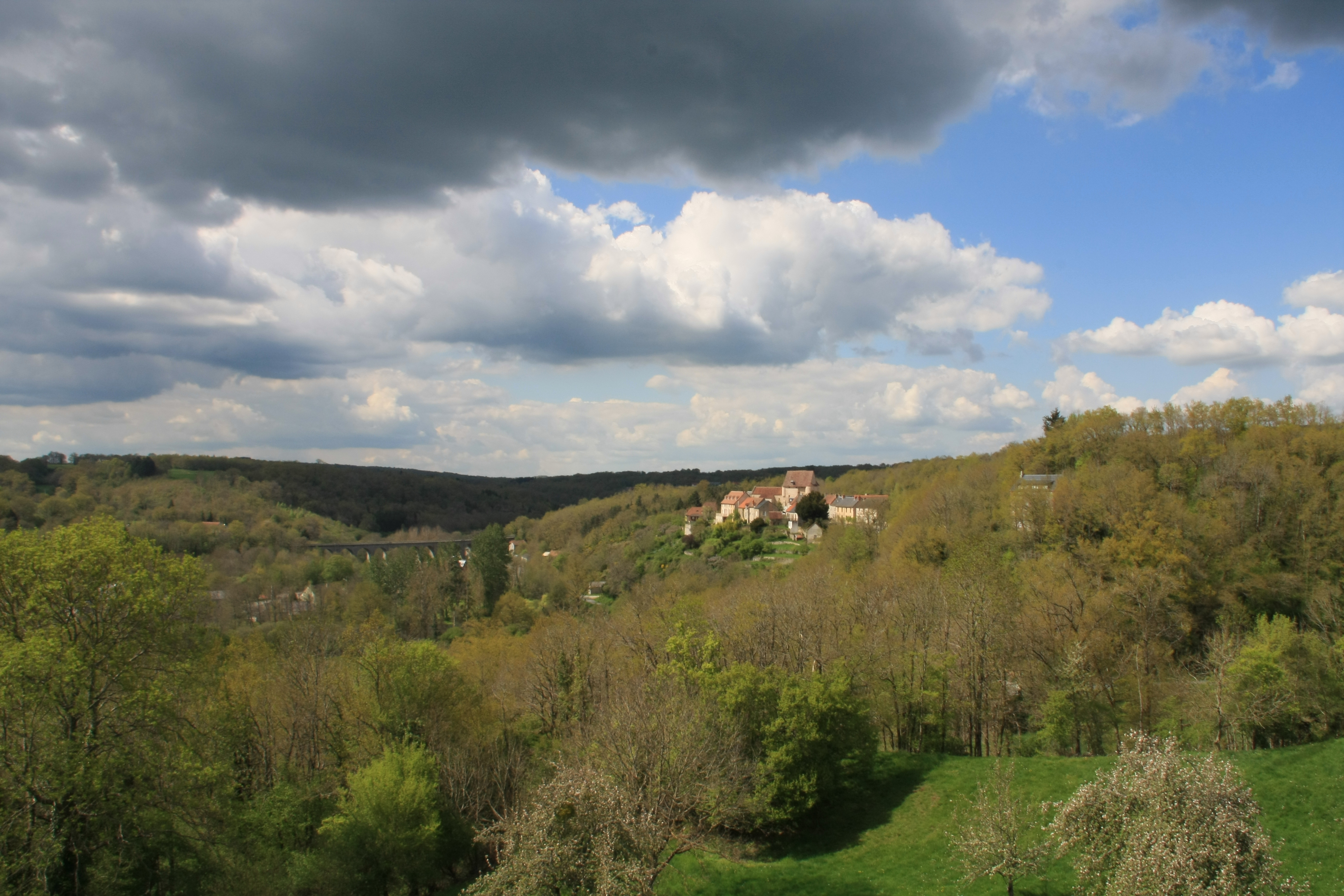
- The village of Glénic, with the viaduct spanning the Creuse river
- Location of Glénic
- Location within France Location within Nouvelle-Aquitaine
- Coordinates: 46°13′27″N 1°55′25″E
- Country: France
- Region: Nouvelle-Aquitaine
- Department: Creuse
- Arrondissement: Guéret
- Canton: Saint-Vaury
- Intercommunality: CA Grand Guéret

Government
  - Mayor (2020–2026): Marie-France Dalot
- Area^{1}: 27.60 km^{2} (10.66 sq mi)
- Elevation: 400 m (1,300 ft)
- Highest elevation: 521 m (1,709 ft)
- Lowest elevation: 293 m (961 ft)
- Population (2023): 625
  - Density: 22.6/km^{2} (58.7/sq mi)
- Time zone: UTC+01:00 (CET)
  - Summer (DST): UTC+02:00 (CEST)
- INSEE/Postal code: 23092 /23380
- ^{1} French Land Register data, which excludes lakes, ponds, glaciers > 1 km^{2} (0.386 sq mi or 247 acres) and river estuaries.

Glénic (French pronunciation: [ɡlenik]; Occitan: Glenic) is a commune in the Creuse department in the Nouvelle-Aquitaine region in central France.

== Geography ==
A farming area comprising the village and several hamlets situated by the banks of the river Creuse, some 4 miles (6.4 km) north of Guéret at the junction of the D6, D940 and the D63 roads.

== Population ==
Historical population
Year	Pop.	±% p.a.
1968	574	—
1975	531	−1.11%
1982	581	+1.29%
1990	605	+0.51%
1999	593	−0.22%
2007	592	−0.02%
2012	631	+1.28%
2017	666	+1.09%
2023	625	−1.05%
Source: INSEE

== Sights ==
- The church, dating from the twelfth century.
- A disused railway viaduct built of stone in the late night.

== See also ==
- Communes of the Creuse department
