= Montaigut-le-Blanc, Creuse =

Commune in Nouvelle-Aquitaine, France

Montaigut-le-Blanc
- Commune
- Location of Montaigut-le-Blanc
- Location within France Location within Nouvelle-Aquitaine
- Coordinates: 46°07′19″N 1°44′09″E
- Country: France
- Region: Nouvelle-Aquitaine
- Department: Creuse
- Arrondissement: Guéret
- Canton: Guéret-2
- Intercommunality: CA Grand Guéret

Government
  - Mayor (2021–2026): Ludivine Chatenet
- Area^{1}: 17.23 km^{2} (6.65 sq mi)
- Elevation: 437 m (1,434 ft)
- Highest elevation: 510 m (1,670 ft)
- Lowest elevation: 390 m (1,280 ft)
- Population (2023): 370
  - Density: 21/km^{2} (56/sq mi)
- Time zone: UTC+01:00 (CET)
  - Summer (DST): UTC+02:00 (CEST)
- INSEE/Postal code: 23132 /23320
- ^{1} French Land Register data, which excludes lakes, ponds, glaciers > 1 km^{2} (0.386 sq mi or 247 acres) and river estuaries.

Montaigut-le-Blanc (French pronunciation: [mɔ̃tɛɡy lə blɑ̃]; Occitan: Montagut) is a commune in the Creuse department in the Nouvelle-Aquitaine region in central France.

== Geography ==
A farming area comprising the village and several hamlets situated some 8 miles (13 km) southwest of Guéret at the junction of the D22, D52 and the D914 roads. The commune is served by a TER railway station at the nearby hamlet of La Neuville.

== Population ==
Historical population
Year	Pop.	±% p.a.
1968	537	—
1975	471	−1.86%
1982	461	−0.31%
1990	448	−0.36%
1999	396	−1.36%
2007	383	−0.42%
2012	393	+0.52%
2017	408	+0.75%
2023	370	−1.62%
Source: INSEE

== Sights ==
- The church, dating from the thirteenth century.
- The restored fifteenth-century castle.
- An eighteenth-century chapel.

== See also ==
- Communes of the Creuse department
