= Ajain =

Commune in Nouvelle-Aquitaine, France

- Commune
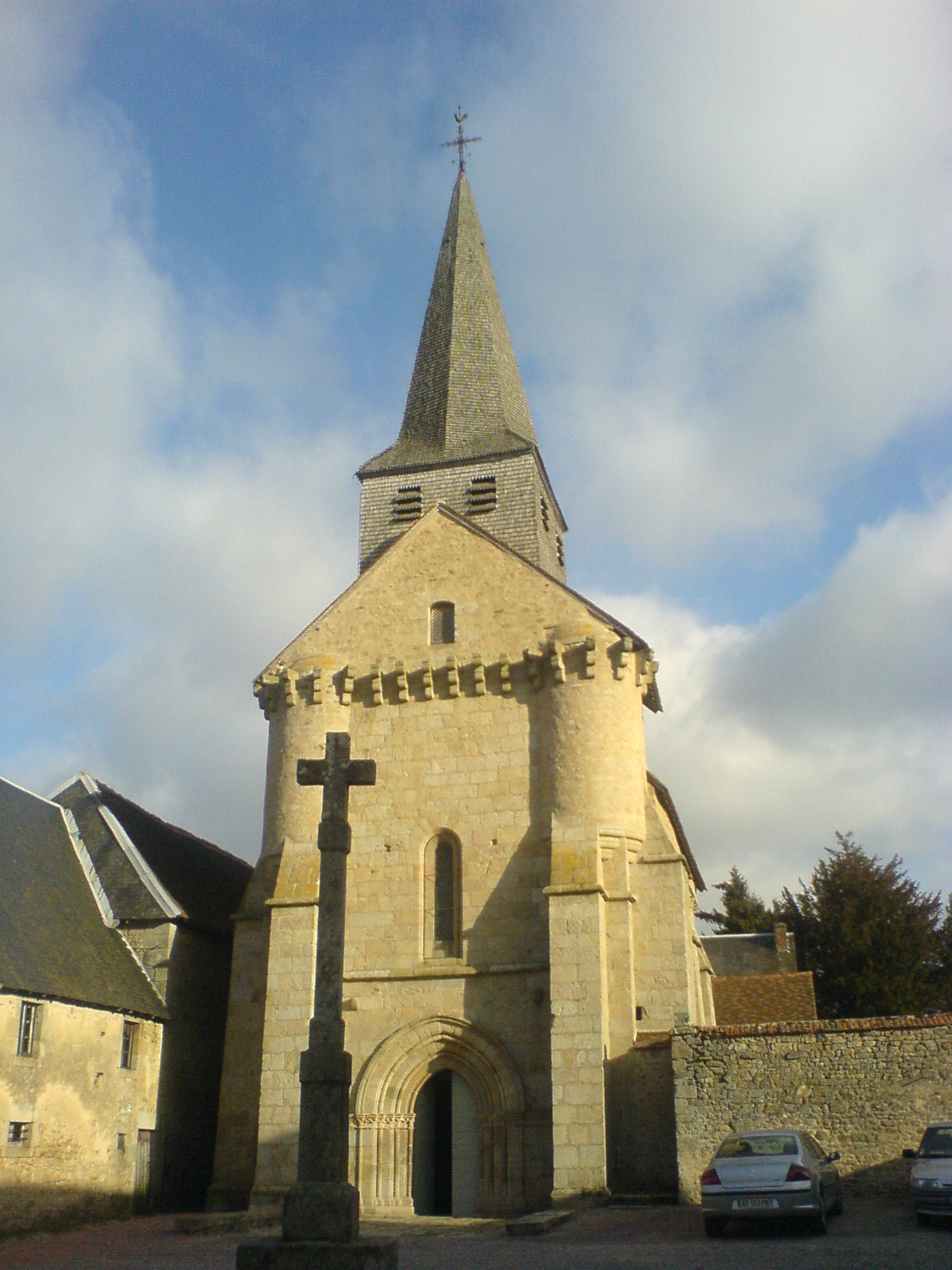
- The church of the Assumption of the Virgin, in Ajain
- Location of Ajain
- Location within France Location within Nouvelle-Aquitaine
- Coordinates: 46°12′29″N 1°59′58″E
- Country: France
- Region: Nouvelle-Aquitaine
- Department: Creuse
- Arrondissement: Guéret
- Canton: Saint-Vaury
- Intercommunality: CA Grand Guéret

Government
  - Mayor (2020–2026): Guy Rouchon
- Area^{1}: 33.14 km^{2} (12.80 sq mi)
- Elevation: 486 m (1,594 ft)
- Highest elevation: 562 m (1,844 ft)
- Lowest elevation: 310 m (1,020 ft)
- Population (2023): 1,019
  - Density: 30.75/km^{2} (79.64/sq mi)
- Time zone: UTC+01:00 (CET)
  - Summer (DST): UTC+02:00 (CEST)
- INSEE/Postal code: 23002 /23380
- ^{1} French Land Register data, which excludes lakes, ponds, glaciers > 1 km^{2} (0.386 sq mi or 247 acres) and river estuaries.

Ajain (French pronunciation: [aʒɛ̃]; Occitan: Ajanh) is a commune in the Creuse department in the Nouvelle-Aquitaine region in central France.

== Geography ==
An area of farming and forestry, comprising the village and several hamlets situated some 6 miles (9.7 km) east of Guéret, at the junction of the N145 with the D11 and the D3.

== History ==
During the French Revolution of 1848, 16 villagers were killed attempting to seek the release of their friends, imprisoned for tax evasion.

== Population ==
Historical population
Year	Pop.	±% p.a.
1968	1,082	—
1975	887	−2.80%
1982	932	+0.71%
1990	982	+0.66%
1999	1,034	+0.57%
2007	1,099	+0.76%
2012	1,099	+0.00%
2017	1,138	+0.70%
2023	1,019	−1.82%
Source: INSEE

== Sights ==
- The church of St.Pierre, dating from the thirteenth century.
- The chapel of Notre-Dame.
- A stone commemorating the revolt of 1848.

== See also ==
- Communes of the Creuse department
