= Communauté de communes Monts et Vallées Ouest Creuse =

Federation of municipalities in France

The Communauté de communes Monts et Vallées Ouest Creuse was a short-lived communauté de communes, an intercommunal structure, in the Creuse department, in the Nouvelle-Aquitaine region, central France. It was created in January 2017 by the merger of the communautés de communes Pays Dunois, Pays Sostranien and Bénévent-Grand-Bourg. This merger was revoked by the administrative court, and on 31 December 2019 the former communautés de communes were recreated. Its population was 25,119 in 2016. Its seat was in La Souterraine.

== Communes ==
The communauté de communes consisted of the following 43 communes:

1. Arrènes
2. Augères
3. Aulon
4. Azat-Châtenet
5. Azerables
6. Bazelat
7. Bénévent-l'Abbaye
8. Le Bourg-d'Hem
9. La Celle-Dunoise
10. Ceyroux
11. Chambon-Sainte-Croix
12. Chamborand
13. La Chapelle-Baloue
14. Châtelus-le-Marcheix
15. Chéniers
16. Colondannes
17. Crozant
18. Dun-le-Palestel
19. Fleurat
20. Fresselines
21. Fursac
22. Le Grand-Bourg
23. Lafat
24. Lizières
25. Maison-Feyne
26. Marsac
27. Mourioux-Vieilleville
28. Naillat
29. Noth
30. Nouzerolles
31. Sagnat
32. Saint-Agnant-de-Versillat
33. Saint-Germain-Beaupré
34. Saint-Goussaud
35. Saint-Léger-Bridereix
36. Saint-Maurice-la-Souterraine
37. Saint-Priest-la-Feuille
38. Saint-Priest-la-Plaine
39. Saint-Sébastien
40. Saint-Sulpice-le-Dunois
41. La Souterraine
42. Vareilles
43. Villard
