= Sédelle =

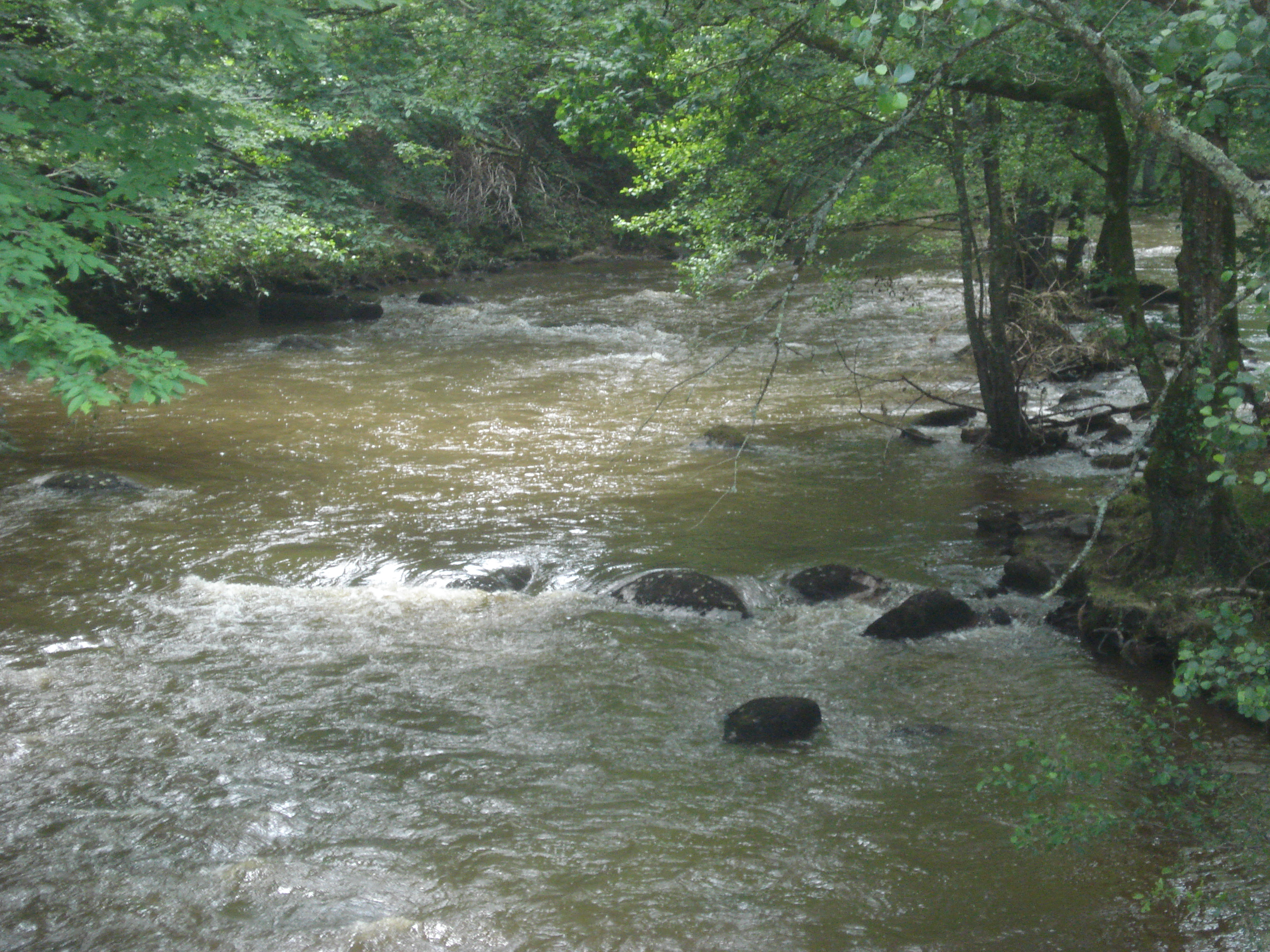
- The Sédelle, near the Pont Charraud at Crozant

- Location within France Location within Nouvelle-Aquitaine

Location
- Country: France

Physical characteristics
- Mouth
  - location: Creuse
  - coordinates: 46.3984°N 1.6189°E
- Length: 37.6 km (23.4 mi)
- Basin size: 250 km^{2} (97 sq mi)
- Discharge
  - average: 2.89 m^{3}/s (102 cu ft/s) (near Lafat)

Basin features
- Progression: Creuse→ Vienne→ Loire→ Atlantic Ocean

The Sédelle is a river in the Creuse department, central France; it is a tributary of the river Creuse and a sub-affluent of the Loire.

== Geography ==
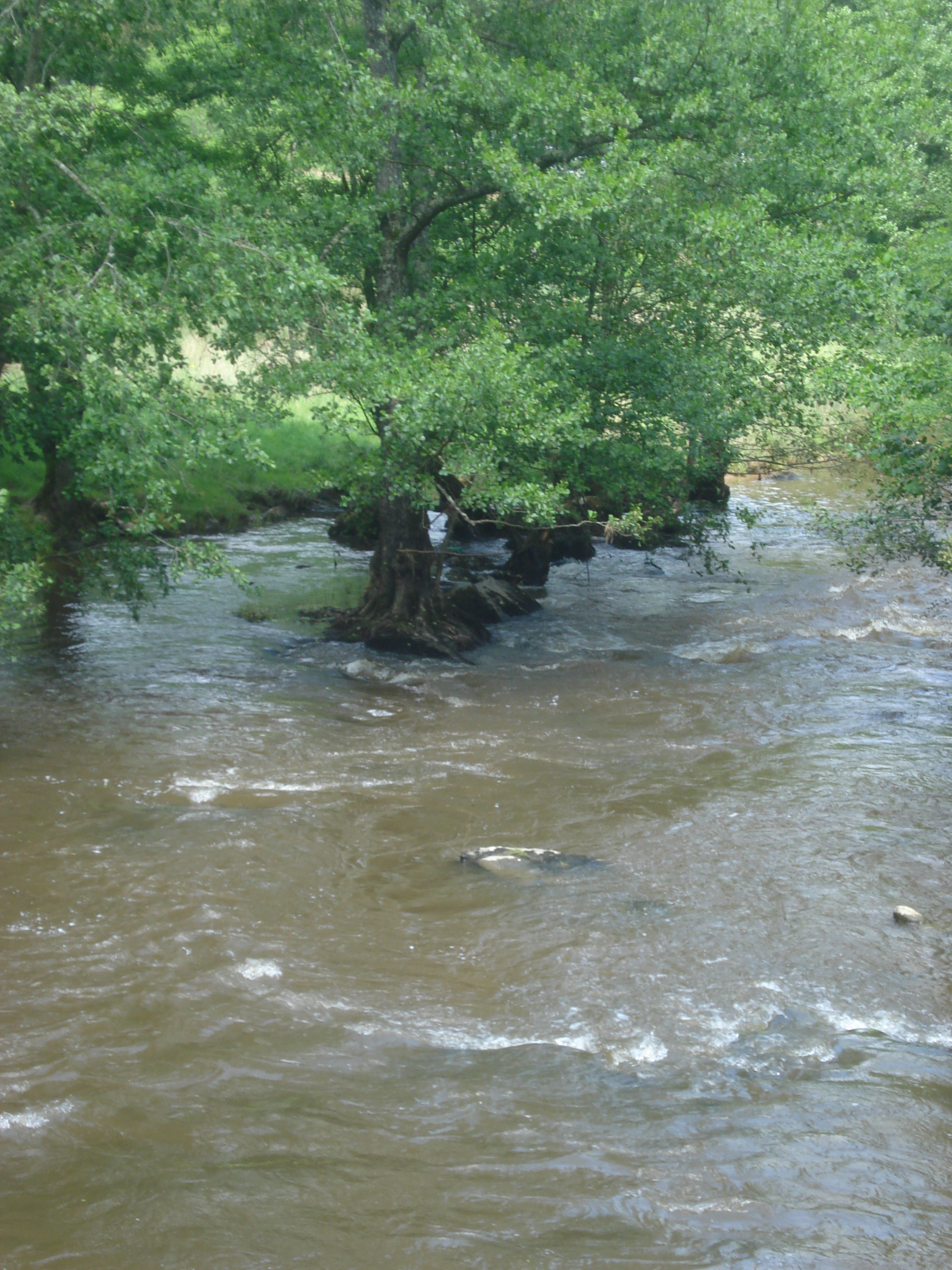
The Sédelle, near La Chapelle-Baloue

It is 37.6 km (23.4 mi) long. The river spring is located near Lizières. The river has a meandering path. It joins la Creuse near the lac de Chambon.

== Towns ==
La Sédelle flows through the communes of Lizières, Saint-Priest-la-Feuille, La Souterraine, Saint-Agnant-de-Versillat, Saint-Germain-Beaupré, Saint-Léger-Bridereix, Sagnat, La Chapelle-Baloue, Lafat and Crozant.

== Fish ==
La Sédelle is lush in wild trouts (truites farios), chubs, bleaks, pikes and zanders. Elle fait ainsi le bonheur des pêcheurs creusois.

== Curiosities and tourism ==
- La Souterraine, medieval town, 11th and 12th century church (tower from the 13th), with a crypt enclosing an old subterranean* Gallo-Roman sanctuary. Many middle-age and Renaissance houses.
- the name of the city
- The lac de Chambon : aquatic sporting activities; hiking; dam visit
- The Crozant school, inhoding landscape painters of the 19th and 20th centuries, near Crozant and Fresselines (a generic term), referring to those who sought inspiration on the riverbanks of la Creuse. In 1889, during a stay at Fresselines, Claude Monet carried out a first series on the confluent of the two Creuses. He made 23 canvas paintings in the valley.
