= Cresset (disambiguation) =

Cresset may refer to:

- Cresset, a metal cup or basket
- Cresset, a multi-family office and a private investment firm
- Cresset Press, publishing company in London
- Edward Cresset (1698–1755), Anglican churchman
- Operation Cresset, nuclear tests completed in 1977-78
- The Cresset, multi-purpose venue in Bretton, Peterborough
- The Cresset, the yearbook of Hickman High School

== See also ==
- Cressat, commune in Nouvelle-Aquitaine, France
- CRESST (disambiguation)
- Creuset (disambiguation)
