= Cressett =

Cressett may refer to:

- Henry Cressett Pelham (1729–1803), British politician, known as Henry Pelham until 1792
- James Cressett (1655–1710), English diplomat
- St Michael's Church, Upton Cressett, redundant Anglican church

== See also ==
- CRESST (disambiguation)
- Cressat
- Cresset
- Creuset (disambiguation)
