= Study of Rocks; Creuse =

1889 painting by Claude Monet

Study of Rocks; Creuse: 'Le Bloc'
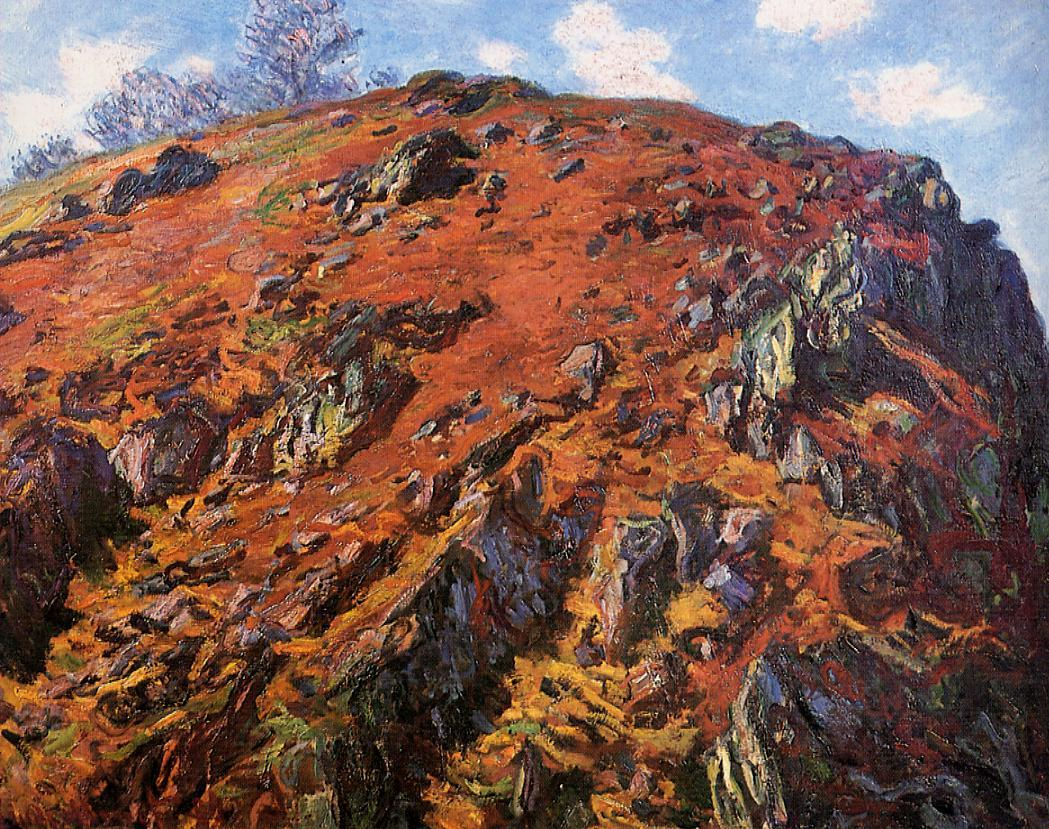
- Study of Rocks; Creuse
- Artist: Claude Monet
- Year: 1889
- Medium: Oil on canvas
- Dimensions: 72.4 cm × 91.4 cm (28.5 in × 36.0 in)

Study of Rocks; Creuse: 'Le Bloc' is an 1889 painting by Claude Monet. It is an oil on canvas and measures 72.4 x 91.4 cm.

Monet gave the painting to Georges Clemenceau in 1899 according to Daniel Wildenstein, though Clemenceau is cited as the owner in an 1891 exhibition catalogue. Clemenceau nicknamed the painting 'Le Bloc' ('The Rock'). The painting was one of fourteen that were exhibited in a joint exhibition with Auguste Rodin at Georges Petit's Parisian gallery in June 1889.

Paul Hayes Tucker, the curator of the 1990 exhibition Monet in the '90s: The Series Paintings, at the Museum of Fine Arts in Boston, Massachusetts, described the painting as "majestic".

The painting was reproduced in a copy by the British artist Gerald Kelly in 1939. Kelly's version is now in a private collection.

Queen Elizabeth the Queen Mother bought the painting for £2,000 in 1949 (equivalent to £61,105 in 2025); it was worth an estimated £15 million at the time of her death in 2002. The dramatist and performer Noël Coward was also an amateur artist and arranged a visit to Clarence House specially to see Study of Rocks.

== Description ==
The painting depicts a hillside covered with rocks and crags; a blue sky with clouds hangs above the scene, with branches on the left hand side against the sky. The location of the painting is a rocky outcrop that rises above the confluence of two sources of the river Creuse. The painting is one of a series of 24 that Monet painted inspired by the landscapes around the village of Fresselines in the department of Creuse.

== See also ==
- List of paintings by Claude Monet
