= Busseau Viaduct =

Bridge in Creuse, Nouvelle-Aquitaine, France

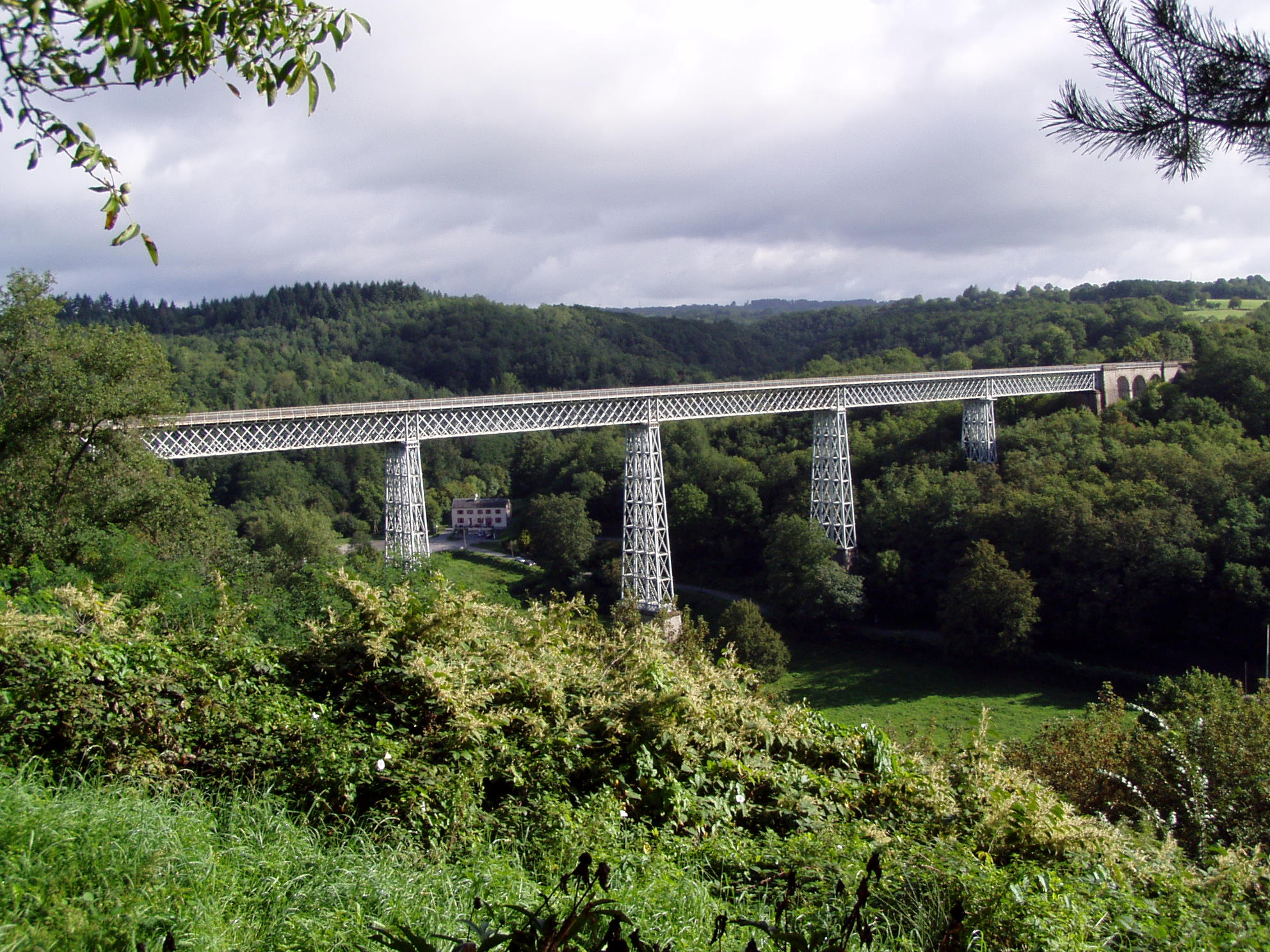
- Coordinates: 46.1232°N 2.0271°E
- Locale: Creuse, France

Location
- Interactive map of Busseau Viaduct

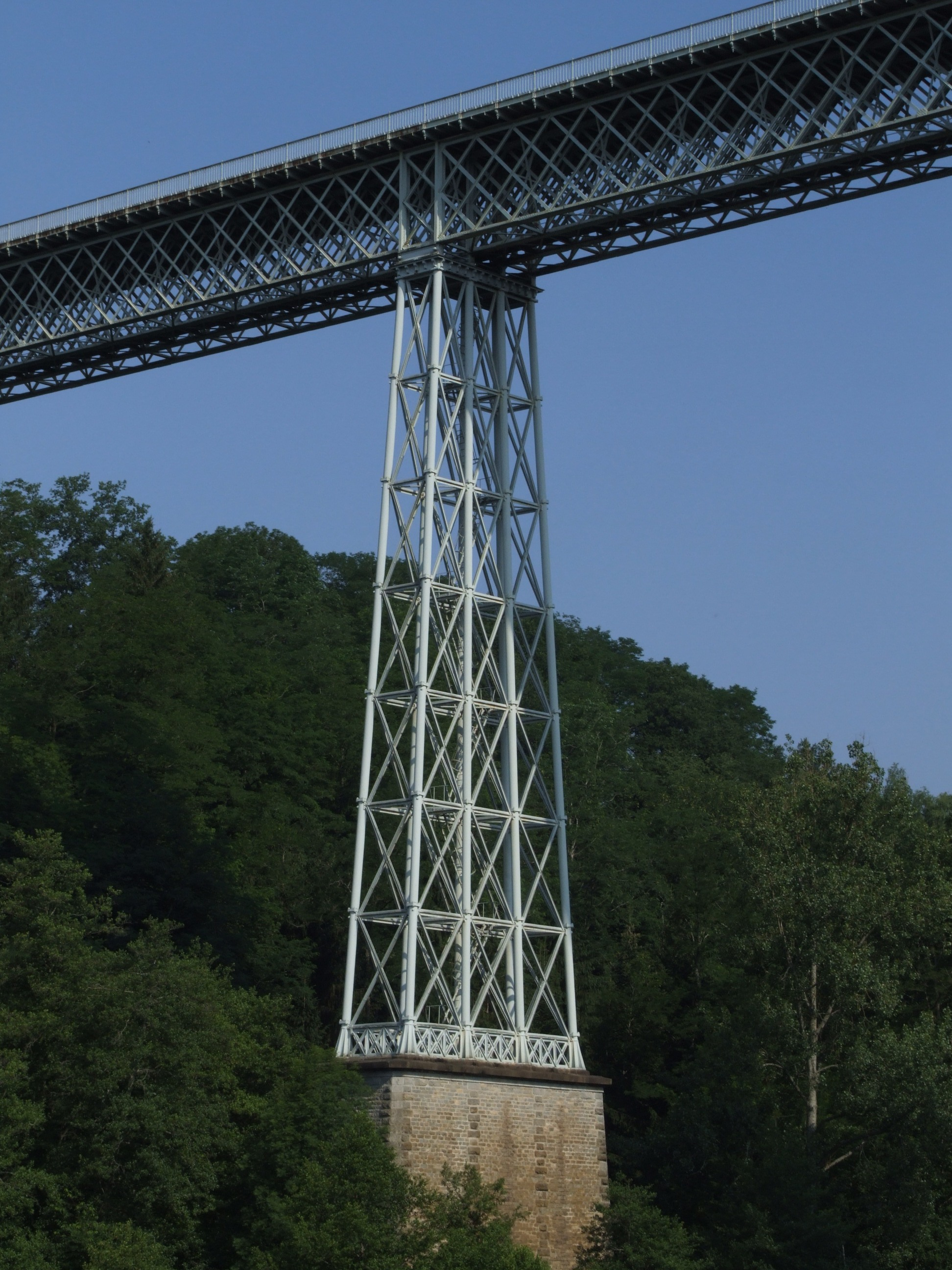
A pillar

The Busseau Viaduct (French: Viaduc de Busseau) is a French railway bridge located in the communes of Ahun, Pionnat and Cressat, in the departement of Creuse, in the region Nouvelle-Aquitaine.

== History ==
It was built in one year, from April 4th to April 4th, by a consortium of companies formed by Basile Parent, Pierre Schaken, Jules-César Houel and Ferdinand Caillet (who later founded Fives-Lille) and the Establishments of Jean-François Cail under the direction of Félix Moreaux.

The project had been closely followed by Nördling who had previously been a member of the international commission that had drawn up the draft of the Grandfey Viaduct on the Sarine, in Switzerland, The first metal railway viaduct in continental Europe, built between 1857 and 1862, transformed in 1925.

The bridge was declared a Monument historique on 15 January 1975.
