= Creusot =

Creusot may refer to

- Le Creusot, town in France noted for its heavy industry
- Communauté urbaine Creusot Montceau, region of France
- 155 mm Creusot Long Tom, an artillery piece
- Creusot steam hammer
- 10233 Le Creusot, an asteroid
- Gare du Creusot TGV, railway station
- Creusot Loire Mk F3 and Creusot Loire Mk 61, armoured vehicles
- Schneider-Creusot, a historic steelworks and arms manufacturer based in Creusot

== See also ==
- Creuset (disambiguation)
