= Maison-Feyne =

Commune in Nouvelle-Aquitaine, France

- Commune
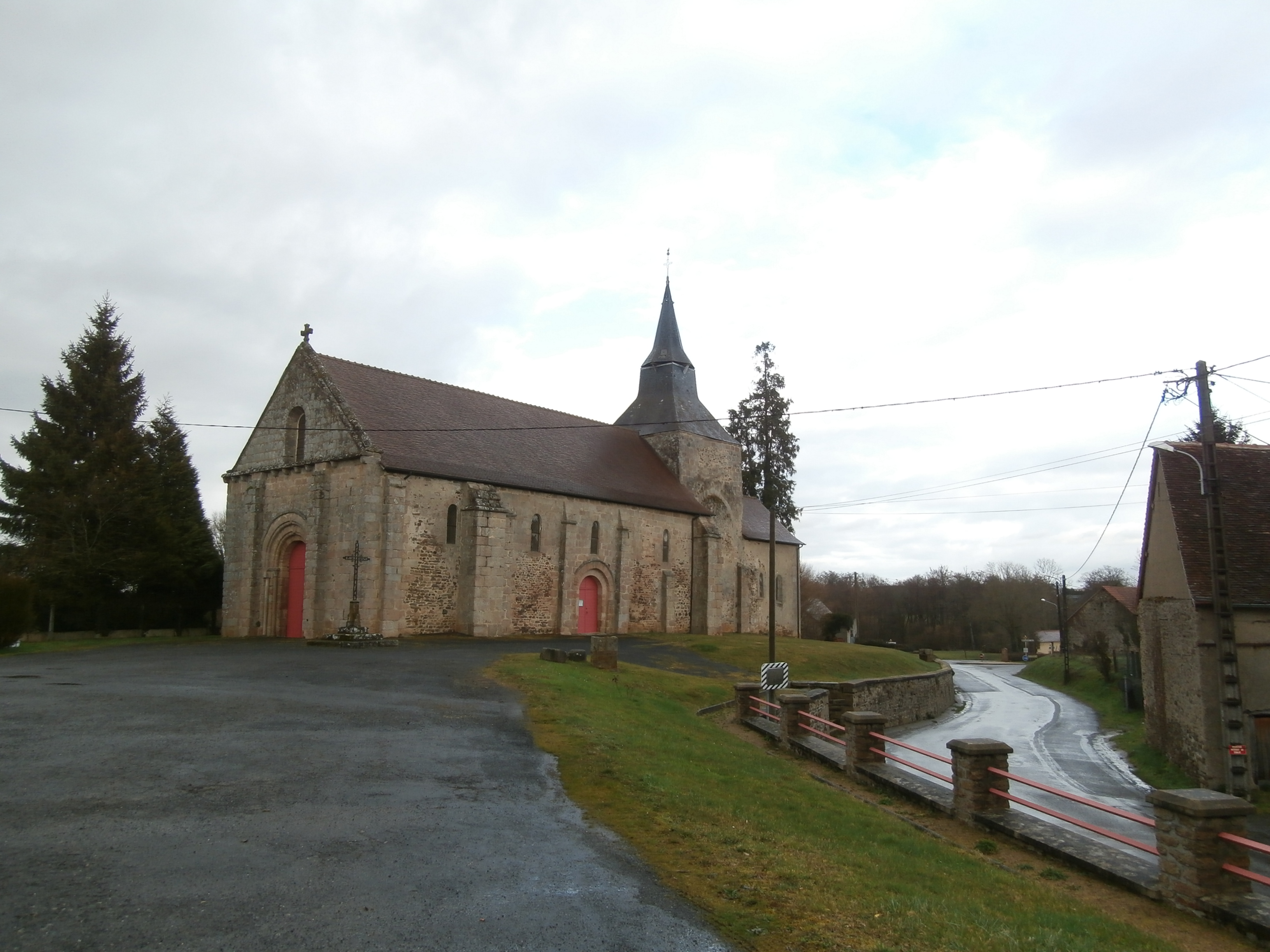
- The church of Saint-Jean, in Maison-Feyne
- Location of Maison-Feyne
- Location within France Location within Nouvelle-Aquitaine
- Coordinates: 46°20′27″N 1°40′15″E
- Country: France
- Region: Nouvelle-Aquitaine
- Department: Creuse
- Arrondissement: Guéret
- Canton: Dun-le-Palestel
- Intercommunality: CC Pays Dunois

Government
  - Mayor (2020–2026): Jean-Claude Chavegrand
- Area^{1}: 13.27 km^{2} (5.12 sq mi)
- Elevation: 340 m (1,120 ft)
- Highest elevation: 368 m (1,207 ft)
- Lowest elevation: 208 m (682 ft)
- Population (2023): 283
  - Density: 21.3/km^{2} (55.2/sq mi)
- Time zone: UTC+01:00 (CET)
  - Summer (DST): UTC+02:00 (CEST)
- INSEE/Postal code: 23117 /23800
- ^{1} French Land Register data, which excludes lakes, ponds, glaciers > 1 km^{2} (0.386 sq mi or 247 acres) and river estuaries.

Maison-Feyne (French pronunciation: [mɛzɔ̃ fɛn]; Occitan: Maison Feine) is a commune in the Creuse department in the Nouvelle-Aquitaine region in central France.

== Geography ==
A farming area comprising the village and some small hamlets, situated some 14 miles (23 km) northwest of Guéret at the junction of the D44, D46 and the D913 roads. The river Creuse forms a small part of the northeast border of the commune.

== Population ==
Historical population
Year	Pop.	±% p.a.
1968	354	—
1975	356	+0.08%
1982	357	+0.04%
1990	314	−1.59%
1999	290	−0.88%
2007	293	+0.13%
2012	301	+0.54%
2017	304	+0.20%
2023	283	−1.19%
Source: INSEE

== Sights ==
- The church of the Assumption, dating from the twelfth century.

== See also ==
- Communes of the Creuse department
