= Claise =

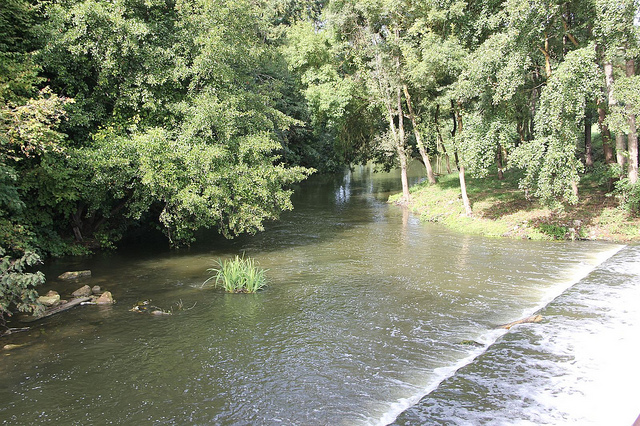
- The Claise in Preuilly-sur-Claise

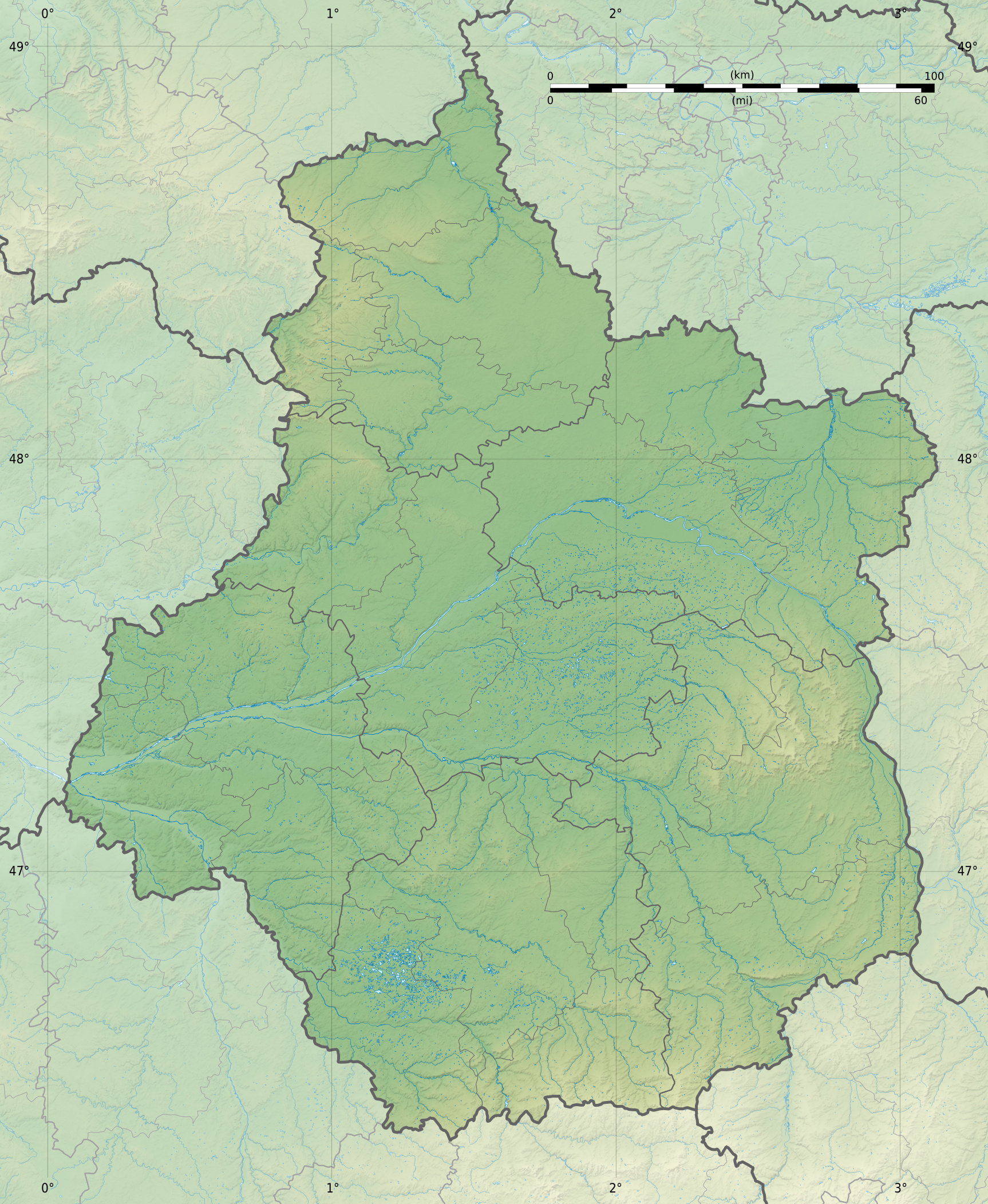
- Location within Centre-Val de Loire Location within France

Location
- Country: France

Physical characteristics
- Mouth: Creuse
  - coordinates: 46°56′30″N 0°42′18″E
- Length: 86.5 km (53.7 mi)

Basin features
- Progression: Creuse→ Vienne→ Loire→ Atlantic Ocean

The Claise (French pronunciation: [klɛz]) is a 86.5 km (53.7 mi) long river in west-central France located in the departments of Indre and Indre-et-Loire (Centre-Val de Loire). It is a tributary of the river Creuse on the right side, and so is a sub-tributary of the Loire by Creuse and Vienne. It flows into the Creuse near Abilly.
