= Communauté de communes du Pays Dunois =

Coordinates: 46.3039°N 1.6611°E

Pays Dunois
- Communauté de communes
- Interactive map of Pays Dunois
- Country: France
- Region: Nouvelle-Aquitaine
- Department: Creuse
- No. of communes: {{{nbcomm}}}
- Established: 3 December 2002
- Area: 339.5 km^{2} (131.1 sq mi)
- Population (2019): 6,958
  - Density: 20.49/km^{2} (53.08/sq mi)

The communauté de communes du Pays Dunois was created on December 3, 2002 and is located in the Creuse département of the Nouvelle-Aquitaine region, in central France. It was merged into the new Communauté de communes Monts et Vallées Ouest Creuse in January 2017, but this merger was revoked and the former communautés de communes were recreated on 31 December 2019. Its area is 339.5 km^{2}, and its population was 6,958 in 2019. Its seat is in Dun-le-Palestel.

It comprises the following 17 communes:

- Le Bourg-d'Hem
- La Celle-Dunoise
- Chambon-Sainte-Croix
- La Chapelle-Baloue
- Chéniers
- Colondannes
- Crozant
- Dun-le-Palestel
- Fresselines
- Lafat
- Maison-Feyne
- Naillat
- Nouzerolles
- Sagnat
- Saint-Sébastien
- Saint-Sulpice-le-Dunois
- Villard
