= Canton of Dun-le-Palestel =

Coordinates: 46°19′28″N 1°39′00″E

Dun-le-Palestel
- Canton
- Interactive map of Dun-le-Palestel
- Country: France
- Region: Nouvelle-Aquitaine
- Department: Creuse
- No. of communes: {{{nbcomm}}}
- Area: 352.49 km^{2} (136.10 sq mi)
- Population (2023): 7,502
  - Density: 21.28/km^{2} (55.12/sq mi)
- INSEE code: 23 07

The canton of Dun-le-Palestel is a canton situated in the Creuse département and in the Nouvelle-Aquitaine region of central France.

== Geography ==
An area of valleys and plateaux, consisting of woodland and farmland, with the town of Dun-le-Palestel, in the arrondissement of Guéret, at its centre. The altitude varies from 197m (Crozant) to 546m (Saint-Sulpice-le-Dunois) with an average altitude of 306m.

== Composition ==
At the French canton reorganisation which came into effect in March 2015, the canton was expanded from 13 to 17 communes:

- Azerables
- Bazelat
- La Celle-Dunoise
- La Chapelle-Baloue
- Colondannes
- Crozant
- Dun-le-Palestel
- Fresselines
- Lafat
- Maison-Feyne
- Naillat
- Nouzerolles
- Sagnat
- Saint-Germain-Beaupré
- Saint-Sébastien
- Saint-Sulpice-le-Dunois
- Villard

== Population ==
Historical population
| Year | Pop. | ±% p.a. |
|---|---|---|
| 2013 | 8,079 | — |
| 2018 | 7,633 | −1.13% |
Source: INSEE

== See also ==
- Arrondissements of the Creuse department
- Cantons of the Creuse department
- Communes of the Creuse department
