= Château de Saint-Germain-Beaupré =

Château in the Creuse département of France

Coordinates: 46°18′45″N 1°32′44″E

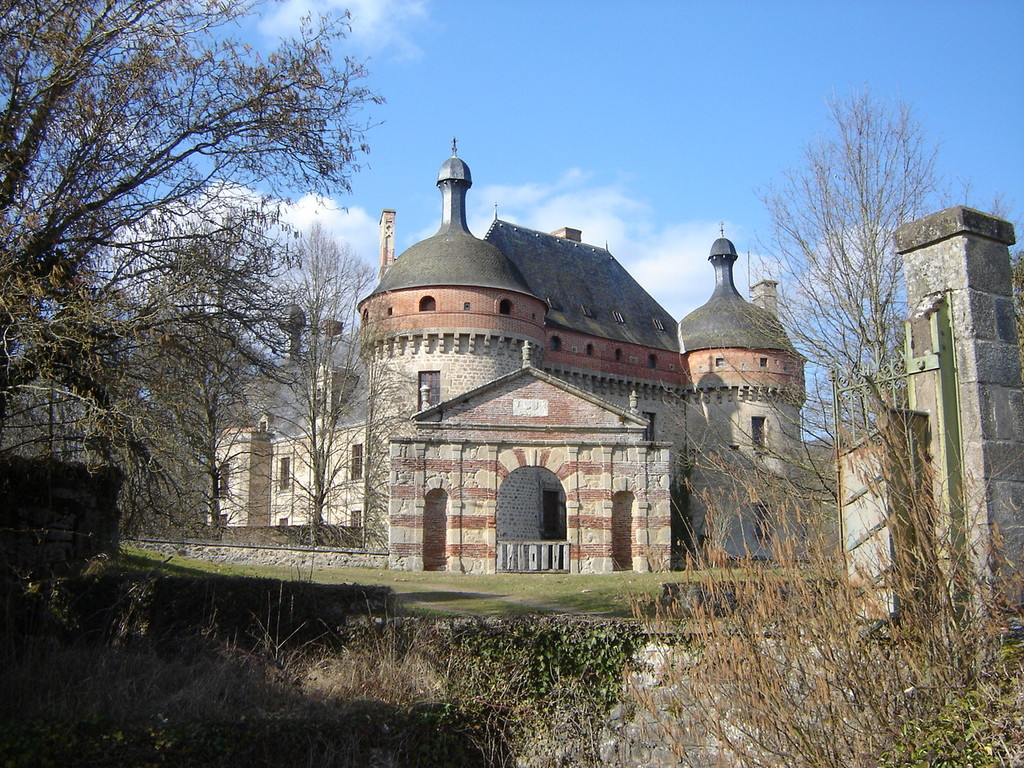
Château de Saint-Germain-Beaupré: entrance

The Château de Saint-Germain-Beaupré is a château in the commune of Saint-Germain-Beaupré in the Creuse département of France.

== History ==
The castle was built in the 16th century, beginning in 1533, on the site of an earlier castle dating from the 12th century, itself rebuilt between 1407 and 1409. The fortress was restored again at the end of the 15th century at the expense, it is said, of Jean VI d'Aumont, who had devastated it twice at the head of League troops.

In 1605, King Henry IV of France spent a night here. In 1666, it housed the King's daughter la Grande Mademoiselle, who recalled her brief stay here in her Mémoires.

In 1768, the castle passed into the hands of the marquis Doublet de Persan who, financially ruined, had to sell it on the eve of the Revolution. Various subsequent owners neglected its upkeep. In 1860, the new owner was forced to carry out repairs including entirely rebuilding a collapsed tower.

Privately owned, the château has been listed since 9 May 1946 as a monument historique by the French Ministry of Culture.

== Architecture ==
The Ministry of Culture has classified as historical monument the moats and entrance from the 16th century as well as the façades and roof. The internal vaulted staircase was listed in 1941.

== See also ==
- List of castles in France
