= Villard, Creuse =

Commune in Nouvelle-Aquitaine, France

Villard
- Commune
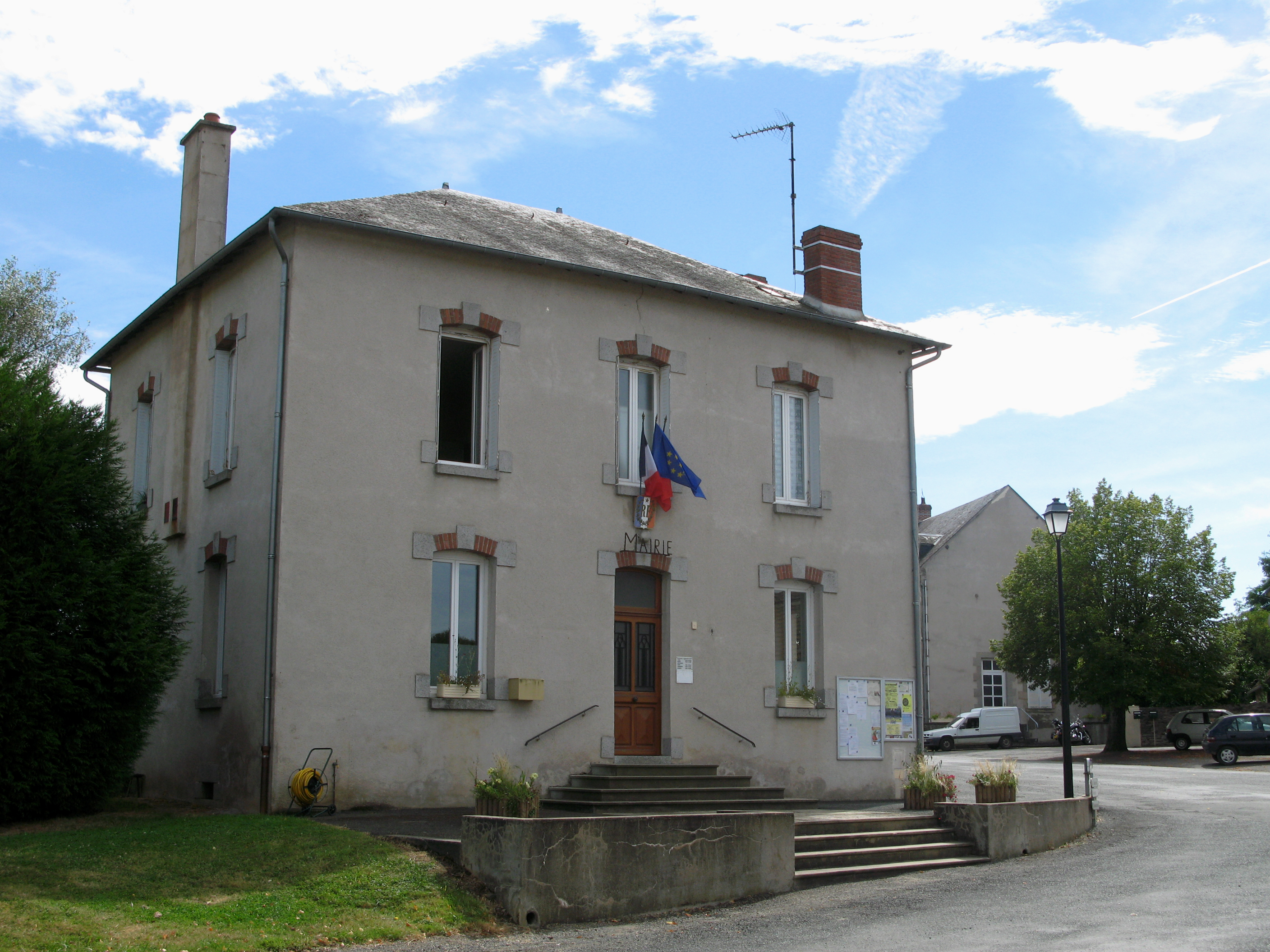
- Town hall
- Location of Villard
- Location within France Location within Nouvelle-Aquitaine
- Coordinates: 46°19′58″N 1°42′06″E
- Country: France
- Region: Nouvelle-Aquitaine
- Department: Creuse
- Arrondissement: Guéret
- Canton: Dun-le-Palestel
- Intercommunality: CC Pays Dunois

Government
  - Mayor (2020–2026): Daniel Forest
- Area^{1}: 16.37 km^{2} (6.32 sq mi)
- Elevation: 320 m (1,050 ft)
- Highest elevation: 375 m (1,230 ft)
- Lowest elevation: 211 m (692 ft)
- Population (2023): 381
  - Density: 23.3/km^{2} (60.3/sq mi)
- Time zone: UTC+01:00 (CET)
  - Summer (DST): UTC+02:00 (CEST)
- INSEE/Postal code: 23263 /23800
- ^{1} French Land Register data, which excludes lakes, ponds, glaciers > 1 km^{2} (0.386 sq mi or 247 acres) and river estuaries.

Villard (French pronunciation: [vilaʁ]; Occitan: Vilar) is a commune in the Creuse department in the Nouvelle-Aquitaine region in central France.

== Geography ==
An area of lakes, forestry and farming comprising the village and several hamlets situated by the banks of the river Creuse, some 15 miles (24 km) northwest of Guéret at the junction of the D5, D46 and the D951 roads.

== Population ==
Historical population
Year	Pop.	±% p.a.
1968	457	—
1975	403	−1.78%
1982	347	−2.11%
1990	341	−0.22%
1999	329	−0.40%
2007	321	−0.31%
2012	354	+1.98%
2017	366	+0.67%
2023	381	+0.67%
Source: INSEE

== Sights ==
- The church, dating from the twelfth century.

== See also ==
- Communes of the Creuse department
