= La Celle-Dunoise =

Commune in Nouvelle-Aquitaine, France

La-Celle-Dunoise
- Commune
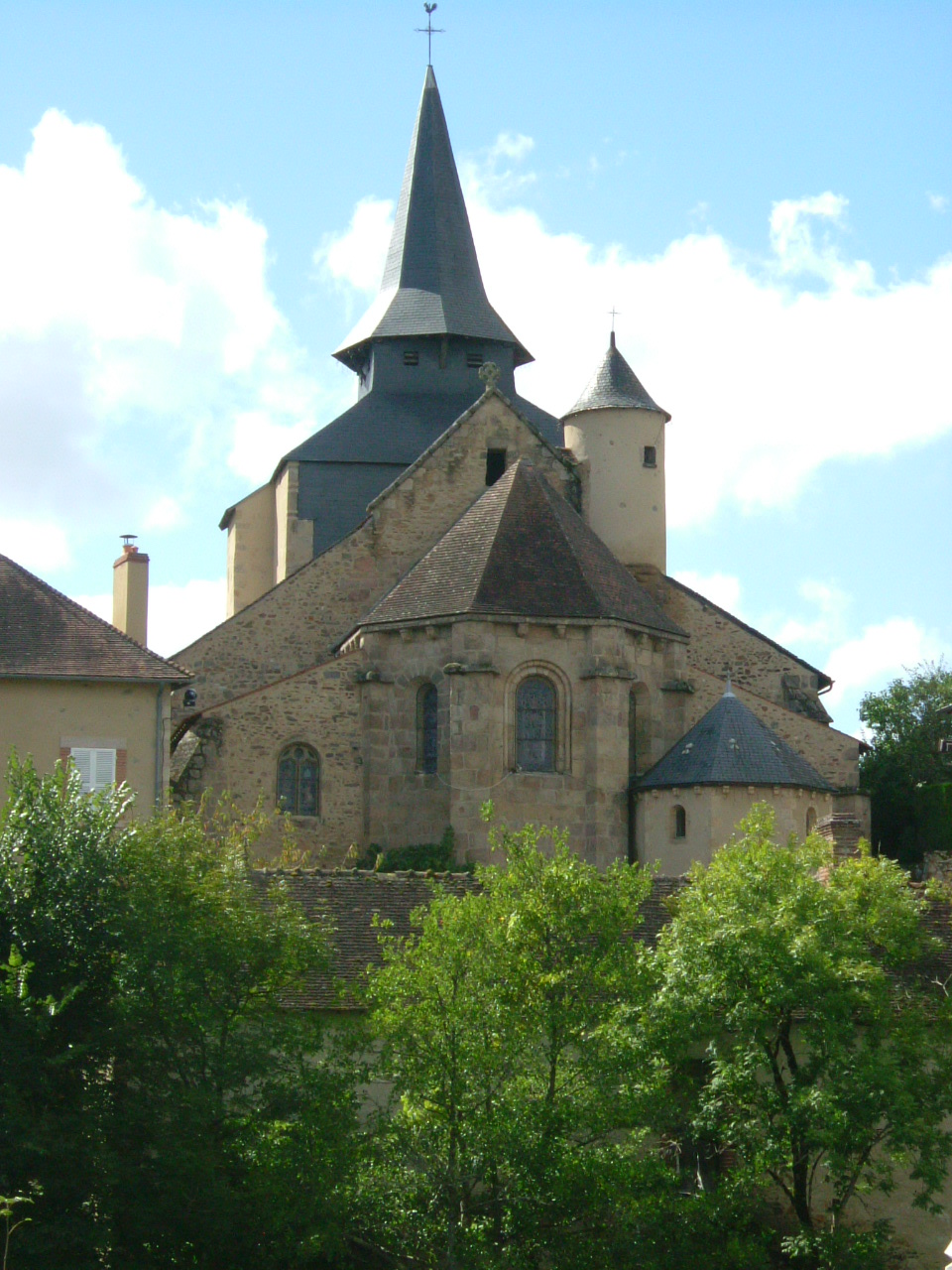
- The church in La Celle-Dunoise

- Coat of arms
- Location of La-Celle-Dunoise
- Location within France Location within Nouvelle-Aquitaine
- Coordinates: 46°18′38″N 1°46′15″E
- Country: France
- Region: Nouvelle-Aquitaine
- Department: Creuse
- Arrondissement: Guéret
- Canton: Dun-le-Palestel
- Intercommunality: CC Pays Dunois

Government
  - Mayor (2021–2026): Jacques-André Boquet
- Area^{1}: 29.11 km^{2} (11.24 sq mi)
- Elevation: 235 m (771 ft)
- Highest elevation: 392 m (1,286 ft)
- Lowest elevation: 216 m (709 ft)
- Population (2023): 534
  - Density: 18.3/km^{2} (47.5/sq mi)
- Time zone: UTC+01:00 (CET)
  - Summer (DST): UTC+02:00 (CEST)
- INSEE/Postal code: 23039 /23800
- ^{1} French Land Register data, which excludes lakes, ponds, glaciers > 1 km^{2} (0.386 sq mi or 247 acres) and river estuaries.

La-Celle-Dunoise (French pronunciation: [la sɛl dynwaz]; Occitan: La Cela de Dun) is a commune in the Creuse department in the Nouvelle-Aquitaine region in central France.

== Geography ==
A farming and quarrying village situated some 12 miles (19 km) northwest of Guéret, at the junction of the D15 and the D22, by the banks of the river Creuse.

== History ==
La Celle-Dunoise has Gallo-Roman origins, as shown by various relics discovered within the territory of the commune.

In 1154, a document mentions the name of Ecclesia Cella, which by 1339 had become Ecclesia de Cella dunensi, giving the name of the village today.
A castle was built here in the 12th century but It was destroyed in 1500. It belonged to the family of La Celle, one of the most powerful families of La Marche in the Middle Ages.

== Population ==
Historical population
Year	Pop.	±% p.a.
1968	880	—
1975	732	−2.60%
1982	668	−1.30%
1990	589	−1.56%
1999	598	+0.17%
2007	606	+0.17%
2012	586	−0.67%
2017	542	−1.55%
2023	534	−0.25%
Source: INSEE

== Sights ==
- The church of St. Pierre, dating from the twelfth century.
- The bridge, dating from the fourteenth century.

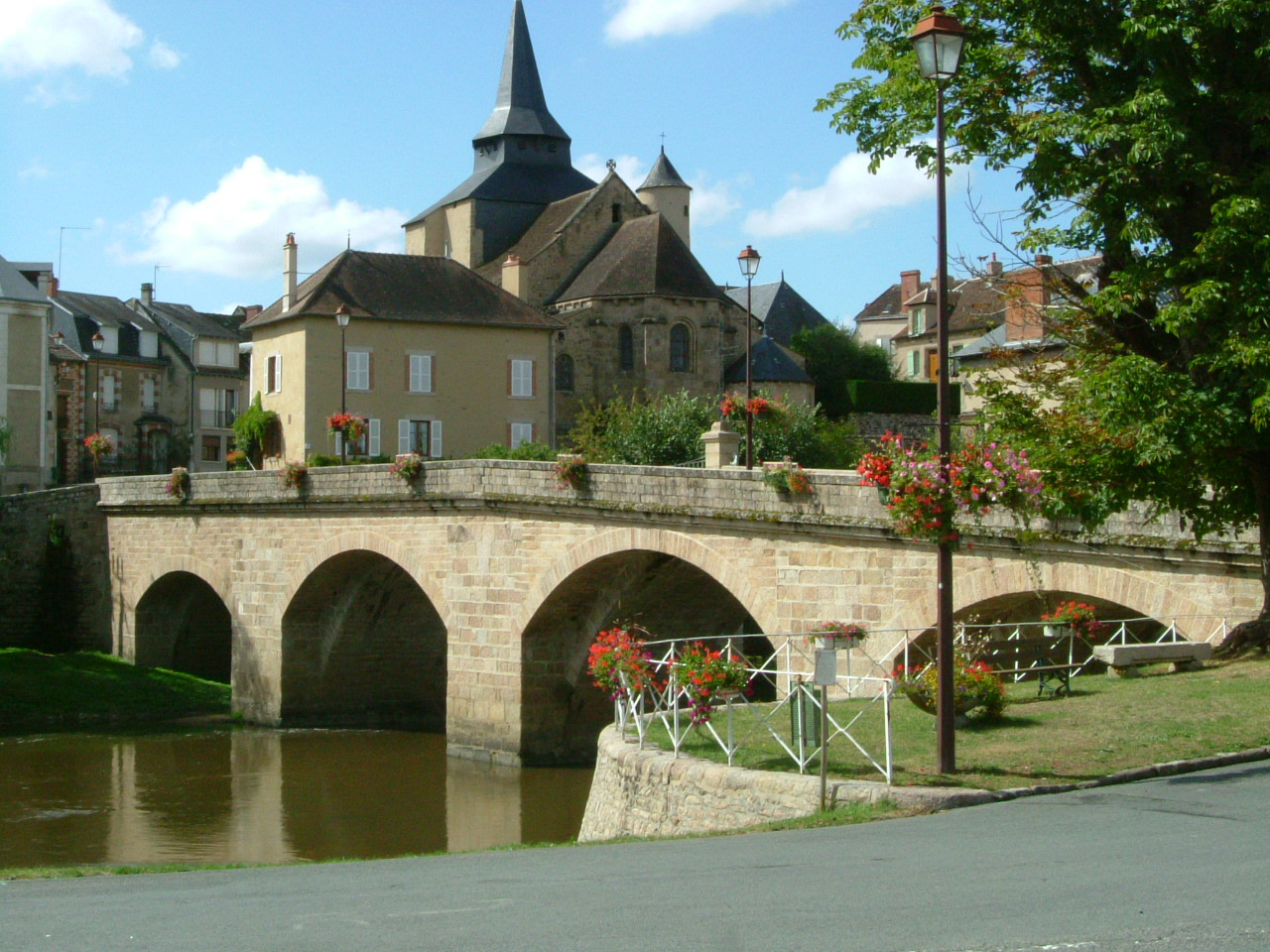
Bridge at La-Celle-Dunoise

== See also ==
- Communes of the Creuse department
