= Saint-Sébastien, Creuse =

Commune in Nouvelle-Aquitaine, France

Saint-Sébastien
- Commune
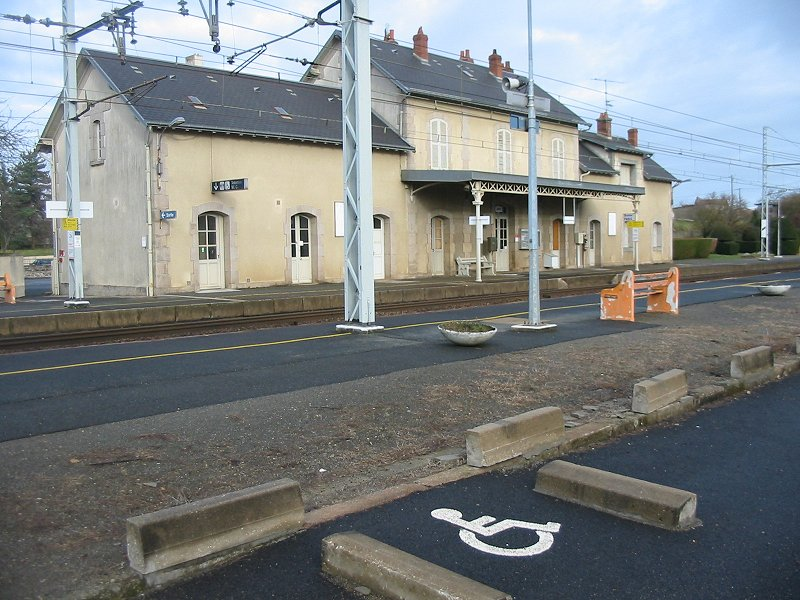
- The Saint-Sébastien railway station
- Location of Saint-Sébastien
- Location within France Location within Nouvelle-Aquitaine
- Coordinates: 46°23′31″N 1°31′57″E
- Country: France
- Region: Nouvelle-Aquitaine
- Department: Creuse
- Arrondissement: Guéret
- Canton: Dun-le-Palestel
- Intercommunality: CC Pays Dunois

Government
  - Mayor (2020–2026): Patricia Roussillat Audoux
- Area^{1}: 24.98 km^{2} (9.64 sq mi)
- Elevation: 321 m (1,053 ft)
- Highest elevation: 361 m (1,184 ft)
- Lowest elevation: 244 m (801 ft)
- Population (2023): 612
  - Density: 24.5/km^{2} (63.5/sq mi)
- Time zone: UTC+01:00 (CET)
  - Summer (DST): UTC+02:00 (CEST)
- INSEE/Postal code: 23239 /23160
- ^{1} French Land Register data, which excludes lakes, ponds, glaciers > 1 km^{2} (0.386 sq mi or 247 acres) and river estuaries.

Saint-Sébastien (French pronunciation: [sɛ̃ sebastjɛ̃]; Limousin: Sent Sebastian) is a commune in the Creuse department in central France.

== Geography ==
The village lies in the middle of the commune, above the right bank of the Abloux, which flows north through the commune.

== Population ==
Historical population
Year	Pop.	±% p.a.
1968	1,064	—
1975	973	−1.27%
1982	854	−1.85%
1990	736	−1.84%
1999	705	−0.48%
2007	690	−0.27%
2012	689	−0.03%
2017	647	−1.25%
2023	612	−0.92%
Source: INSEE

== See also ==
- Communes of the Creuse department
