= Dun-le-Palestel =

Commune in Nouvelle-Aquitaine, France

- Commune
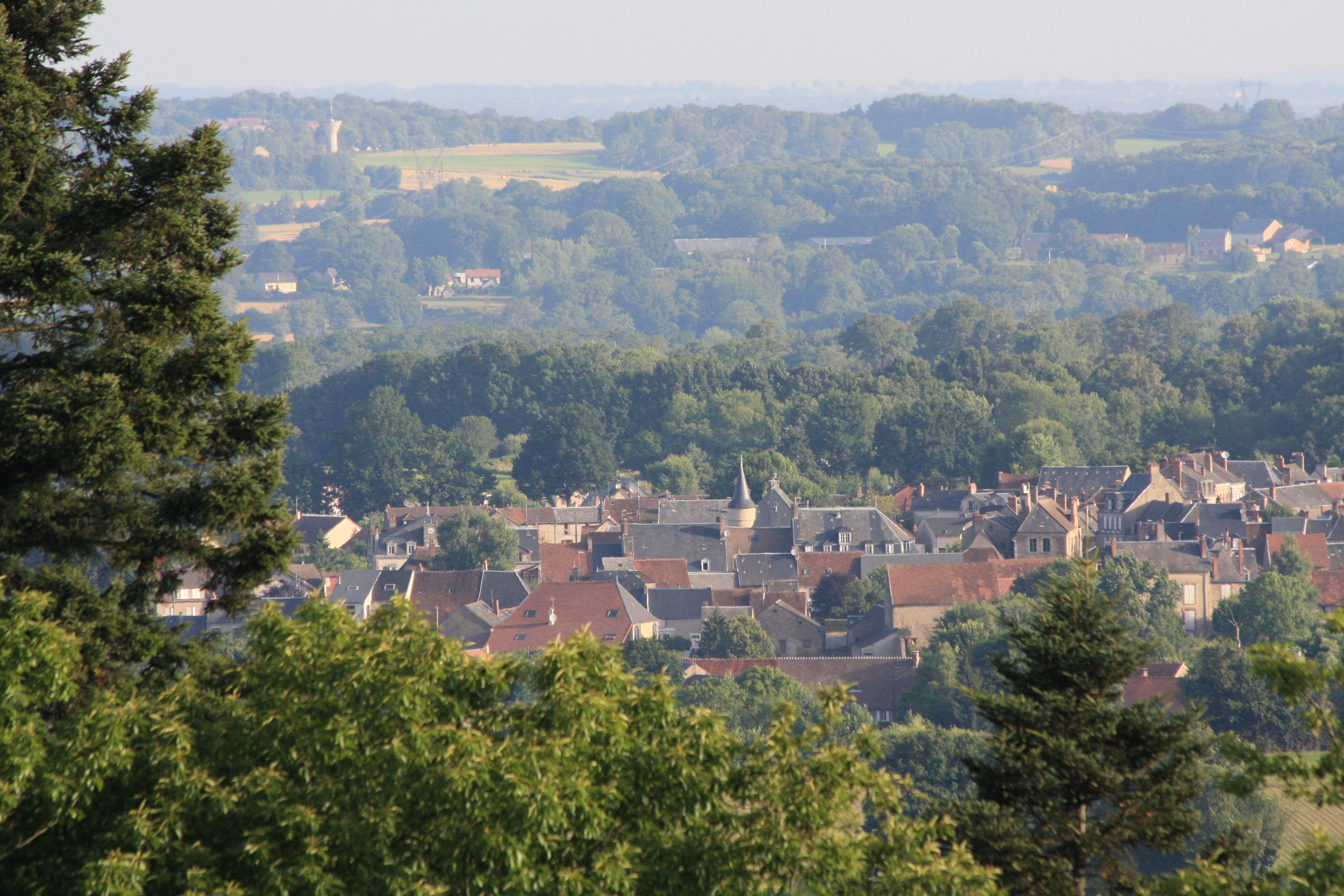
- The village from the Chabannes Wood

- Coat of arms
- Location of Dun-le-Palestel
- Location within France Location within Nouvelle-Aquitaine
- Coordinates: 46°18′22″N 1°40′00″E
- Country: France
- Region: Nouvelle-Aquitaine
- Department: Creuse
- Arrondissement: Guéret
- Canton: Dun-le-Palestel
- Intercommunality: CC Pays Dunois

Government
  - Mayor (2020–2026): Laurent Daulny
- Area^{1}: 9.81 km^{2} (3.79 sq mi)
- Elevation: 366 m (1,201 ft)
- Highest elevation: 507 m (1,663 ft)
- Lowest elevation: 294 m (965 ft)
- Population (2023): 1,096
  - Density: 112/km^{2} (289/sq mi)
- Time zone: UTC+01:00 (CET)
  - Summer (DST): UTC+02:00 (CEST)
- INSEE/Postal code: 23075 /23800
- ^{1} French Land Register data, which excludes lakes, ponds, glaciers > 1 km^{2} (0.386 sq mi or 247 acres) and river estuaries.

Dun-le-Palestel (French pronunciation: [dœ̃ lə palɛstɛl]; Occitan: Dun) is a commune in the Creuse department in the Nouvelle-Aquitaine region in central France.

== Geography ==
A farming and light industrial village situated some 15 miles (24 km) northwest of Guéret at the junction of the D913, D44, D5 and the D951 roads.

== Population ==
Historical population
Year	Pop.	±% p.a.
1968	1,260	—
1975	1,330	+0.78%
1982	1,293	−0.40%
1990	1,203	−0.90%
1999	1,106	−0.93%
2007	1,147	+0.46%
2012	1,158	+0.19%
2017	1,116	−0.74%
2023	1,096	−0.30%
Source: INSEE

== Sights ==
- The church of Notre-Dame, built between 1905 and 1908.
- The Lavoir of Dunet where the residents of the village washed their linens before the invention of the washing machine.
- The portal of the old church, dating from the thirteenth century.
- The war memorial.
- Vestiges of the moat of a castle.
- A dolmen known as the Pierre Eubeste, at La Valette.

== See also ==
- Communes of the Creuse department
