= Nouzerolles =

Commune in Nouvelle-Aquitaine, France

- Commune
- Location of Nouzerolles
- Location within France Location within Nouvelle-Aquitaine
- Coordinates: 46°22′57″N 1°44′33″E
- Country: France
- Region: Nouvelle-Aquitaine
- Department: Creuse
- Arrondissement: Guéret
- Canton: Dun-le-Palestel
- Intercommunality: CC Pays Dunois

Government
  - Mayor (2020–2026): Jean-Pierre Laurent
- Area^{1}: 8.17 km^{2} (3.15 sq mi)
- Elevation: 343 m (1,125 ft)
- Highest elevation: 342 m (1,122 ft)
- Lowest elevation: 210 m (690 ft)
- Population (2023): 100
  - Density: 12/km^{2} (32/sq mi)
- Time zone: UTC+01:00 (CET)
  - Summer (DST): UTC+02:00 (CEST)
- INSEE/Postal code: 23147 /23360
- ^{1} French Land Register data, which excludes lakes, ponds, glaciers > 1 km^{2} (0.386 sq mi or 247 acres) and river estuaries.

Nouzerolles (French pronunciation: [nuzʁɔl]; Occitan: Noseròles) is a commune in the Creuse department in the Nouvelle-Aquitaine region in central France.

== Geography ==
A small farming village situated on the border with the department of Indre, some 16 miles (26 km) northwest of Guéret, at the junction of the D5 and the D78 roads. The Petite Creuse river forms all of the commune's southern border.

== Population ==
Historical population
Year	Pop.	±% p.a.
1968	196	—
1975	176	−1.53%
1982	139	−3.32%
1990	111	−2.77%
1999	100	−1.15%
2007	102	+0.25%
2012	103	+0.20%
2017	99	−0.79%
2023	100	+0.17%
Source: INSEE

== Sights ==
- The fourteenth-century church.
- St. Antoine's chapel
- A fortified manorhouse.
- The remains of an eleventh-century tower and a castle.
- An old stone bridge crossing the Petite Creuse.

== See also ==
- Communes of the Creuse department
