= Naillat =

Commune in Nouvelle-Aquitaine, France

- Commune
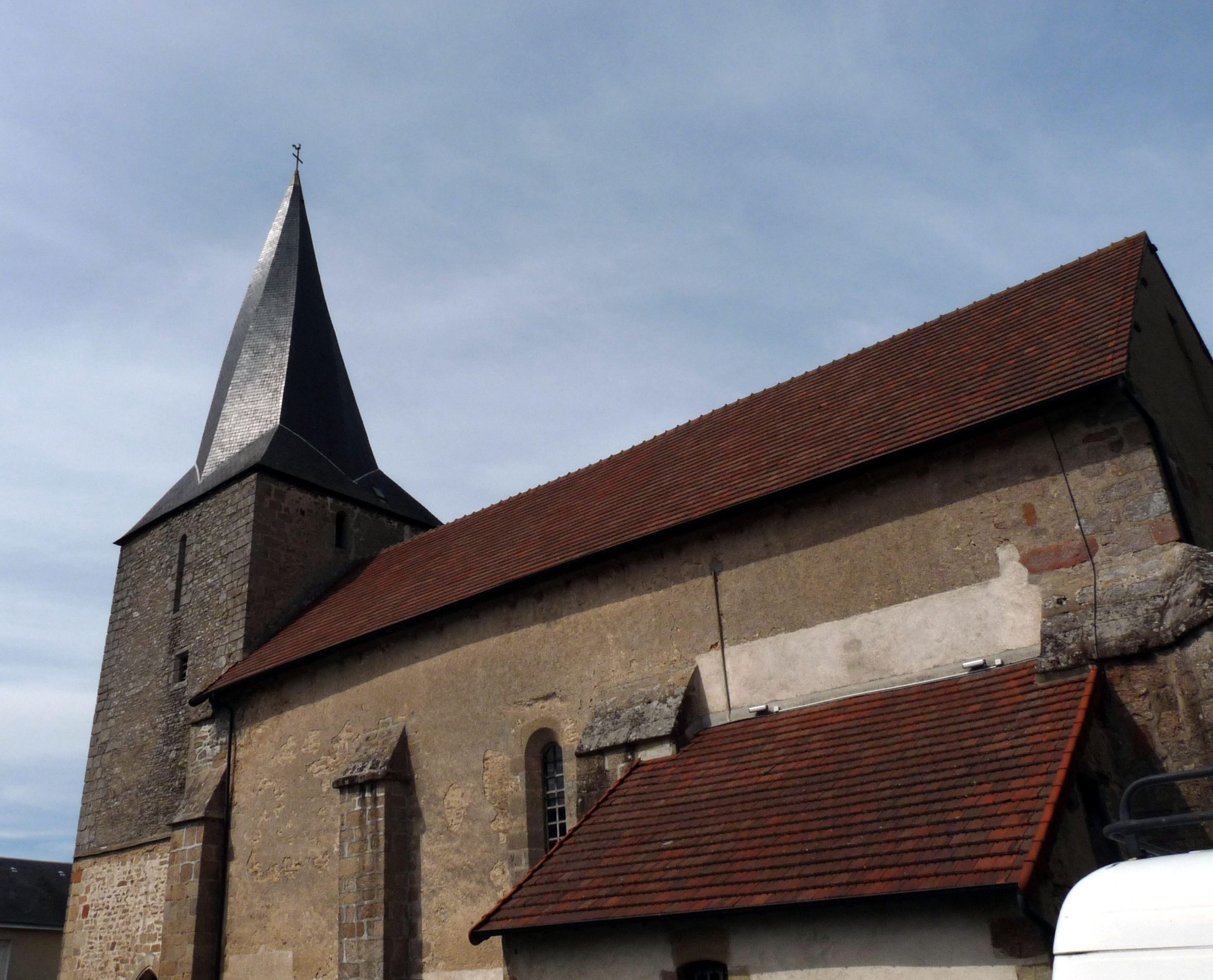
- The church of Saint-Médard, in Naillat
- Location of Naillat
- Location within France Location within Nouvelle-Aquitaine
- Coordinates: 46°15′55″N 1°38′18″E
- Country: France
- Region: Nouvelle-Aquitaine
- Department: Creuse
- Arrondissement: Guéret
- Canton: Dun-le-Palestel
- Intercommunality: CC Pays Dunois

Government
  - Mayor (2020–2026): Laurent Tardy
- Area^{1}: 36.23 km^{2} (13.99 sq mi)
- Elevation: 360 m (1,180 ft)
- Highest elevation: 530 m (1,740 ft)
- Lowest elevation: 316 m (1,037 ft)
- Population (2023): 687
  - Density: 19.0/km^{2} (49.1/sq mi)
- Time zone: UTC+01:00 (CET)
  - Summer (DST): UTC+02:00 (CEST)
- INSEE/Postal code: 23141 /23800
- ^{1} French Land Register data, which excludes lakes, ponds, glaciers > 1 km^{2} (0.386 sq mi or 247 acres) and river estuaries.

Naillat (French pronunciation: [naja]; Occitan: Nalhac) is a commune in the Creuse department in the Nouvelle-Aquitaine region in central France.

== Geography ==
A farming area comprising the village and several hamlets situated some 14 miles (23 km) northwest of Guéret at the junction of the D5, D14 and the D44 roads. A small tributary of the Creuse, the river Brézentine flows through the middle of the village.

== Population ==
Historical population
Year	Pop.	±% p.a.
1968	1,084	—
1975	955	−1.79%
1982	809	−2.34%
1990	721	−1.43%
1999	641	−1.30%
2007	655	+0.27%
2012	675	+0.60%
2017	639	−1.09%
2023	687	+1.21%
Source: INSEE

== Sights ==
- The twelfth-century church, with a twisted spire.
- A feudal motte.
- Two menhirs.
- The château de La Vergne.

== See also ==
- Communes of the Creuse department
