= Bazelat =

Commune in Nouvelle-Aquitaine, France

- Commune
- Location of Bazelat
- Location within France Location within Nouvelle-Aquitaine
- Coordinates: 46°21′11″N 1°32′21″E
- Country: France
- Region: Nouvelle-Aquitaine
- Department: Creuse
- Arrondissement: Guéret
- Canton: Dun-le-Palestel
- Intercommunality: CC Pays Sostranien

Government
  - Mayor (2020–2026): Patrice Piarraud
- Area^{1}: 13.43 km^{2} (5.19 sq mi)
- Elevation: 345 m (1,132 ft)
- Highest elevation: 400 m (1,300 ft)
- Lowest elevation: 280 m (920 ft)
- Population (2023): 221
  - Density: 16.5/km^{2} (42.6/sq mi)
- Time zone: UTC+01:00 (CET)
  - Summer (DST): UTC+02:00 (CEST)
- INSEE/Postal code: 23018 /23160
- ^{1} French Land Register data, which excludes lakes, ponds, glaciers > 1 km^{2} (0.386 sq mi or 247 acres) and river estuaries.

Bazelat (French pronunciation: [bazla]; Limousin: Balasac) is a commune in the Creuse department in the Nouvelle-Aquitaine region in central France.

== Geography ==
A farming area comprising the village and several hamlets situated by the banks of the river Abloux, some 22 miles (35 km) northwest of Guéret, on the D71 road near its junction with the D70. The commune borders the département of Indre.

The river Abloux has its source in the commune.

== Population ==
Historical population
Year	Pop.	±% p.a.
1968	492	—
1975	429	−1.94%
1982	373	−1.98%
1990	303	−2.56%
1999	285	−0.68%
2007	284	−0.04%
2012	281	−0.21%
2017	256	−1.85%
2023	221	−2.42%
Source: INSEE

== Sights ==
- The church, dating from the twelfth century.
- A restored public washhouse.

== See also ==
- Communes of the Creuse department
