= Le Bourg-d'Hem =

Commune in Nouvelle-Aquitaine, France

Le Bourg-d'Hem Le Borg d'Hem (Occitan)
- Commune
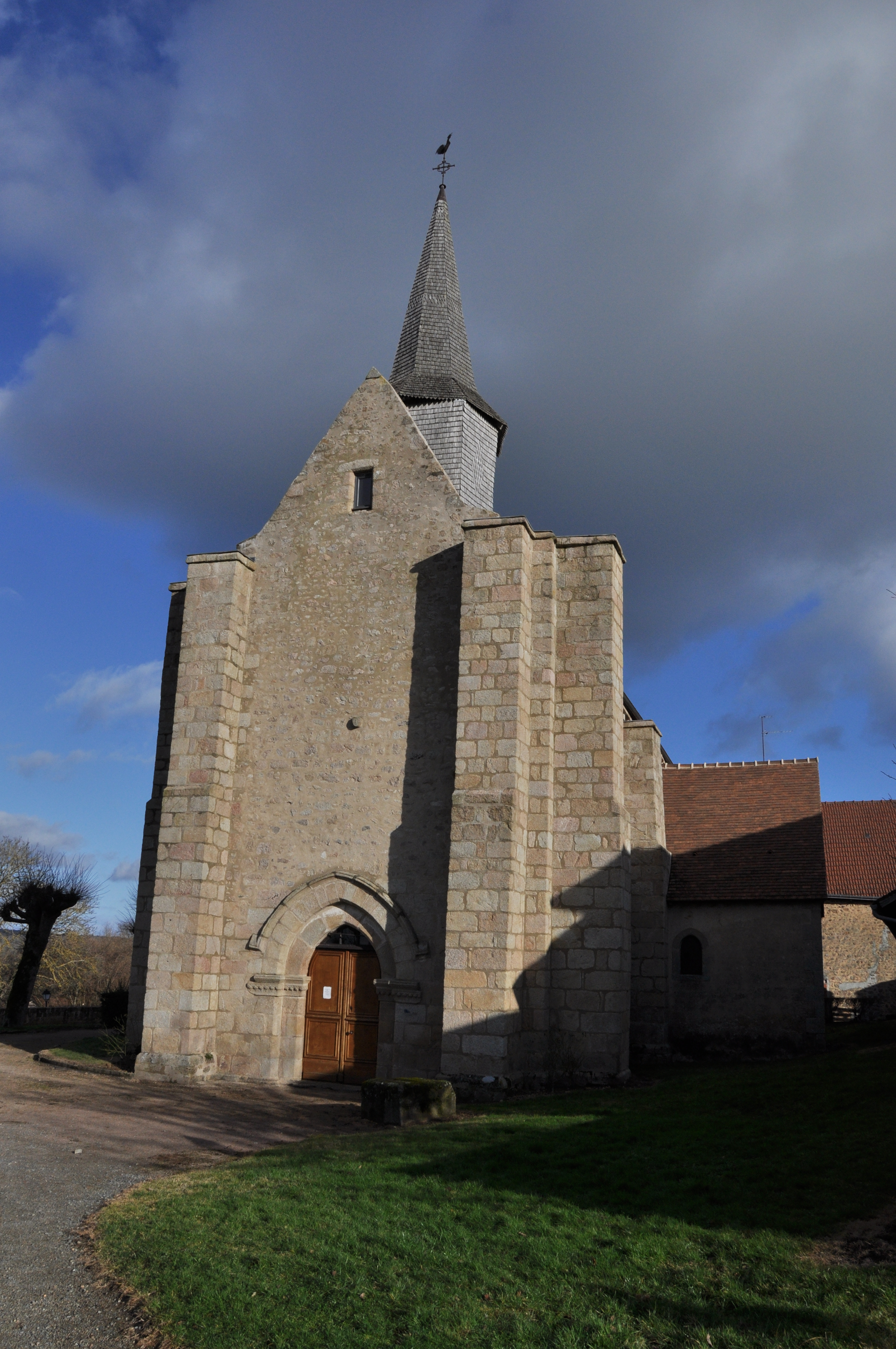
- The church in Le Bourg-d'Hem
- Location of Le Bourg-d'Hem
- Location within France Location within Nouvelle-Aquitaine
- Coordinates: 46°17′50″N 1°49′44″E
- Country: France
- Region: Nouvelle-Aquitaine
- Department: Creuse
- Arrondissement: Guéret
- Canton: Bonnat
- Intercommunality: CC Pays Dunois

Government
  - Mayor (2020–2026): Robert Deschamps
- Area^{1}: 15.39 km^{2} (5.94 sq mi)
- Elevation: 38 m (125 ft)
- Highest elevation: 445 m (1,460 ft)
- Lowest elevation: 235 m (771 ft)
- Population (2023): 226
  - Density: 14.7/km^{2} (38.0/sq mi)
- Time zone: UTC+01:00 (CET)
  - Summer (DST): UTC+02:00 (CEST)
- INSEE/Postal code: 23029 /23220
- ^{1} French Land Register data, which excludes lakes, ponds, glaciers > 1 km^{2} (0.386 sq mi or 247 acres) and river estuaries.

Le Bourg-d'Hem (French pronunciation: [lə buʁdɛm]; Occitan: Le Borg d'Hem; Marchois: Le Borg d'Ent) is a commune in the Creuse department in the Nouvelle-Aquitaine region in central France.

== Geography ==
A farming and forestry area comprising the village and a few small hamlets situated some 9 miles (14 km) north of Guéret at the junction of the D15, D33, D56 and the D48 roads. The river Creuse flows through the commune, which is dammed near Guémontet, flooding much of the valley.

== Population ==
Historical population
Year	Pop.	±% p.a.
1968	361	—
1975	294	−2.89%
1982	290	−0.20%
1990	278	−0.53%
1999	235	−1.85%
2007	215	−1.11%
2012	224	+0.82%
2017	213	−1.00%
2023	226	+0.99%
Source: INSEE

== Sights ==
- The chateau de Villebaston, dating from the twelfth century.
- The twelfth century church of St.Julien.
- The rebuilt watermill at Gué Vignaud.
- The dam, the ‘Barrage de l'Age’.

== Personalities ==
- Marc Bloch, French historian, was shot on 16 June 1944, and is buried here.

== See also ==
- Communes of the Creuse department
