= Lafat =

Commune in Nouvelle-Aquitaine, France

- Commune
- Coat of arms
- Location of Lafat
- Location within France Location within Nouvelle-Aquitaine
- Coordinates: 46°20′08″N 1°36′53″E
- Country: France
- Region: Nouvelle-Aquitaine
- Department: Creuse
- Arrondissement: Guéret
- Canton: Dun-le-Palestel
- Intercommunality: CC Pays Dunois

Government
  - Mayor (2020–2026): Marie-Claude Glénisson
- Area^{1}: 21.28 km^{2} (8.22 sq mi)
- Elevation: 330 m (1,080 ft)
- Highest elevation: 368 m (1,207 ft)
- Lowest elevation: 261 m (856 ft)
- Population (2023): 328
  - Density: 15.4/km^{2} (39.9/sq mi)
- Time zone: UTC+01:00 (CET)
  - Summer (DST): UTC+02:00 (CEST)
- INSEE/Postal code: 23103 /23800
- ^{1} French Land Register data, which excludes lakes, ponds, glaciers > 1 km^{2} (0.386 sq mi or 247 acres) and river estuaries.

Lafat is a commune in the Creuse department in the Nouvelle-Aquitaine region in central France.

== Geography ==
A farming area comprising the village and a few small hamlets situated some 18 miles (29 km) northwest of Guéret at the junction of the D49 and the D69 roads. The small rivers Sédelle and Brézentine, tributaries of the Creuse, flow through the commune.

== Population ==
Historical population
Year	Pop.	±% p.a.
1968	643	—
1975	601	−0.96%
1982	546	−1.36%
1990	458	−2.17%
1999	384	−1.94%
2007	377	−0.23%
2012	376	−0.05%
2017	350	−1.42%
2023	328	−1.08%
Source: INSEE

== Sights ==
- The church, dating from the fifteenth century.
- The thirteenth-century chapel.
- A watermill.

== See also ==
- Communes of the Creuse department
