= Chéniers =

Commune in Nouvelle-Aquitaine, France

- Commune
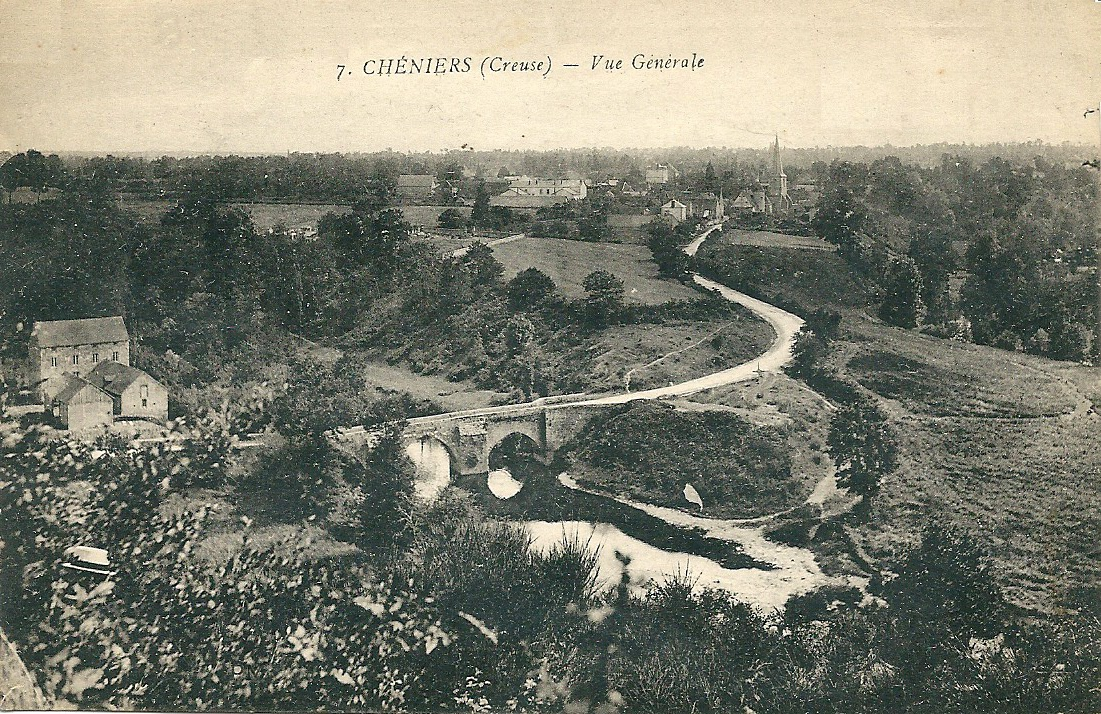
- A general view of Chéniers, around 1920

- Coat of arms
- Location of Chéniers
- Location within France Location within Nouvelle-Aquitaine
- Coordinates: 46°21′06″N 1°49′42″E
- Country: France
- Region: Nouvelle-Aquitaine
- Department: Creuse
- Arrondissement: Guéret
- Canton: Bonnat
- Intercommunality: CC Pays Dunois

Government
  - Mayor (2020–2026): Gilles Gaudon
- Area^{1}: 34.9 km^{2} (13.5 sq mi)
- Elevation: 277 m (909 ft)
- Highest elevation: 384 m (1,260 ft)
- Lowest elevation: 230 m (750 ft)
- Population (2023): 554
  - Density: 15.9/km^{2} (41.1/sq mi)
- Time zone: UTC+01:00 (CET)
  - Summer (DST): UTC+02:00 (CEST)
- INSEE/Postal code: 23062 /23220
- ^{1} French Land Register data, which excludes lakes, ponds, glaciers > 1 km^{2} (0.386 sq mi or 247 acres) and river estuaries.

Chéniers (French pronunciation: [ʃenje]; Occitan: Chamniers) is a commune in the Creuse department in the Nouvelle-Aquitaine region in central France.

== Geography ==
An area of forestry and farming comprising the village and several hamlets, situated in the valley of the Petite Creuse river, some 12 miles (19 km) north of Guéret at the junction of the D46 and the D48 roads.

== Population ==
Historical population
Year	Pop.	±% p.a.
1968	837	—
1975	706	−2.40%
1982	684	−0.45%
1990	631	−1.00%
1999	583	−0.88%
2007	572	−0.24%
2012	562	−0.35%
2017	572	+0.35%
2023	554	−0.53%
Source: INSEE

== Sights ==
- The church of St. Martin, dating from the twelfth century.
- A restored watermill at the hamlet of Piot.
- The remains of a feudal castle at Monty.
- A large covered lavoir in the town.

== See also ==
- Communes of the Creuse department
