= Azerables =

Commune in Nouvelle-Aquitaine, France

- Commune
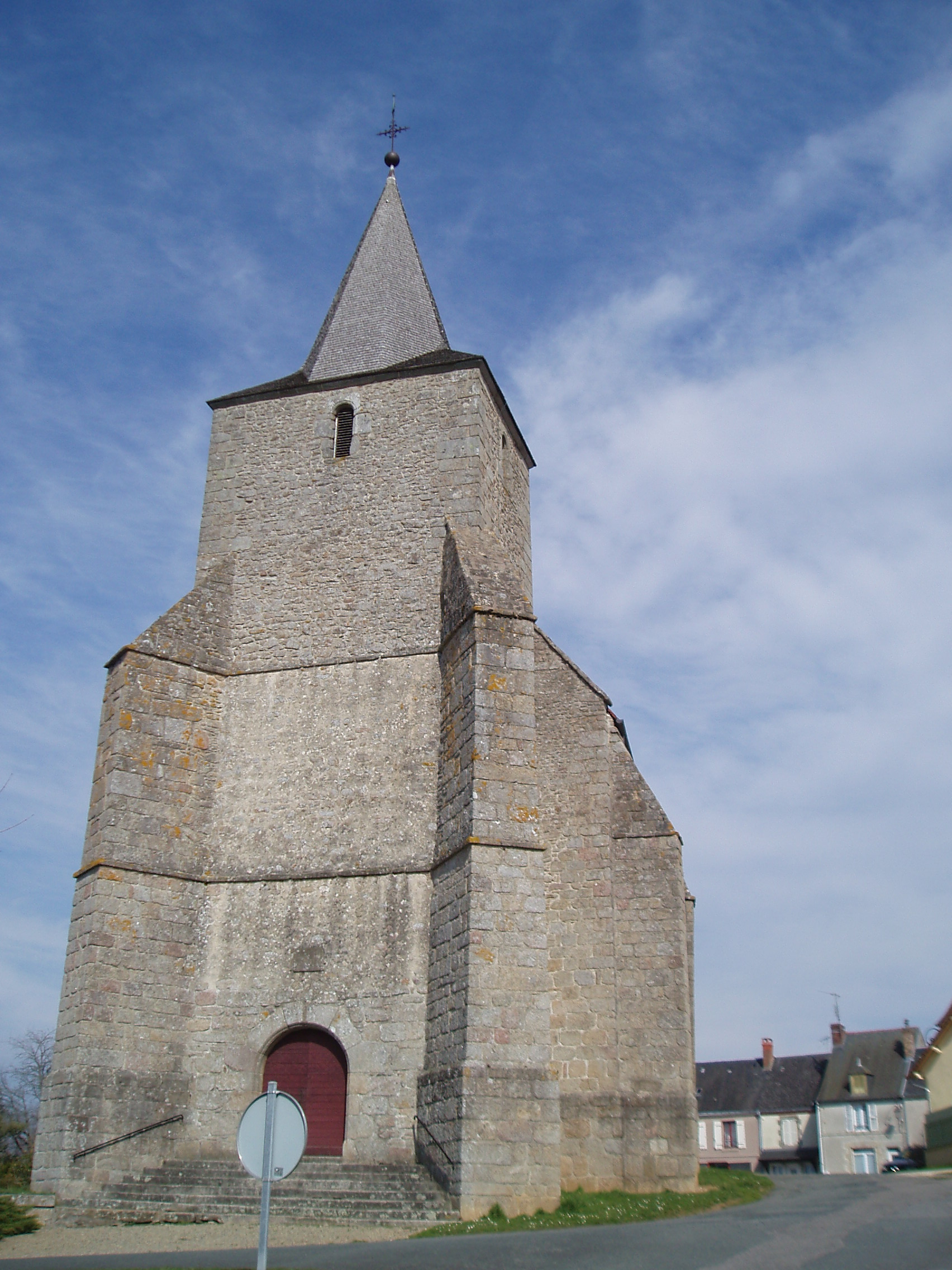
- The church of Saint-Georges, in Azerables
- Location of Azerables
- Location within France Location within Nouvelle-Aquitaine
- Coordinates: 46°21′17″N 1°28′40″E
- Country: France
- Region: Nouvelle-Aquitaine
- Department: Creuse
- Arrondissement: Guéret
- Canton: Dun-le-Palestel
- Intercommunality: CC Pays Sostranien

Government
  - Mayor (2020–2026): Yves Aumaitre
- Area^{1}: 39.44 km^{2} (15.23 sq mi)
- Elevation: 350 m (1,150 ft)
- Highest elevation: 394 m (1,293 ft)
- Lowest elevation: 273 m (896 ft)
- Population (2023): 804
  - Density: 20.4/km^{2} (52.8/sq mi)
- Time zone: UTC+01:00 (CET)
  - Summer (DST): UTC+02:00 (CEST)
- INSEE/Postal code: 23015 /23160
- ^{1} French Land Register data, which excludes lakes, ponds, glaciers > 1 km^{2} (0.386 sq mi or 247 acres) and river estuaries.

Azerables (French pronunciation: [azeʁabl]; Limousin: Drable) is a commune in the Creuse department in the Nouvelle-Aquitaine region in central France.

== Geography ==
An area of farming and lakes comprising the village and several hamlets situated by the banks of the river Anglin, some 23 miles (37 km) northwest of Guéret, at the junction of the D1, D15 and the D70. The A20 autoroute forms much of the western border of the commune.

The river Anglin has its source in the commune.

The river Abloux forms most of the commune's eastern border.

== Population ==
Historical population
Year	Pop.	±% p.a.
1968	1,258	—
1975	1,136	−1.45%
1982	1,033	−1.35%
1990	1,019	−0.17%
1999	958	−0.68%
2007	864	−1.28%
2012	902	+0.86%
2017	815	−2.01%
2023	804	−0.23%
Source: INSEE

== Sights ==
- The church, dating from the twelfth century.
- A fifteenth-century chapel.
- A modern chapel.

== See also ==
- Communes of the Creuse department
