= La Chapelle-Baloue =

Commune in Nouvelle-Aquitaine, France

- Commune
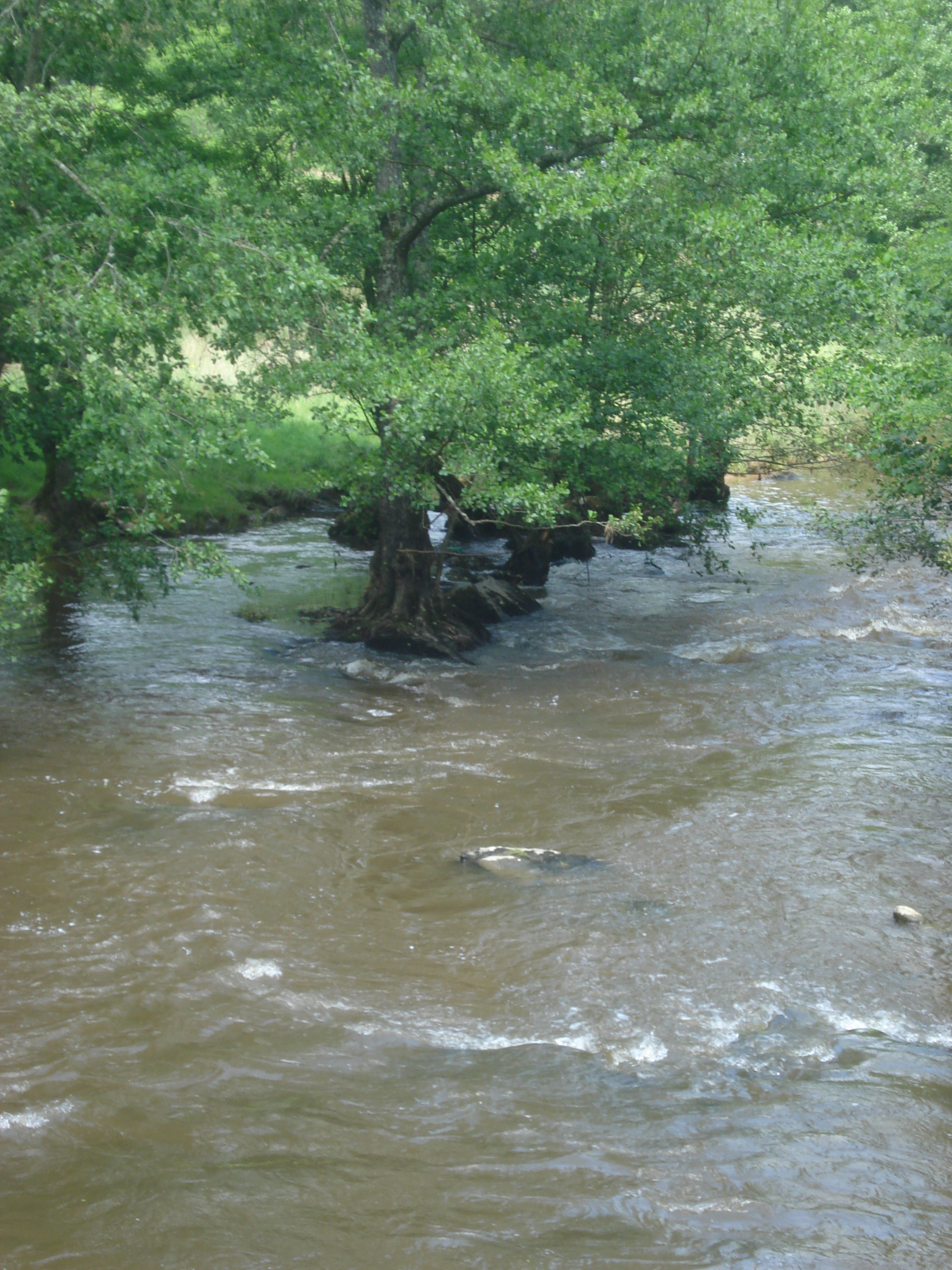
- The Sédelle river, near to La Chapelle-Baloue
- Location of La Chapelle-Baloue
- Location within France Location within Nouvelle-Aquitaine
- Coordinates: 46°21′38″N 1°34′39″E
- Country: France
- Region: Nouvelle-Aquitaine
- Department: Creuse
- Arrondissement: Guéret
- Canton: Dun-le-Palestel
- Intercommunality: CC Pays Dunois

Government
  - Mayor (2020–2026): Béatrice Gomes
- Area^{1}: 8.68 km^{2} (3.35 sq mi)
- Highest elevation: 381 m (1,250 ft)
- Lowest elevation: 261 m (856 ft)
- Population (2023): 114
  - Density: 13.1/km^{2} (34.0/sq mi)
- Time zone: UTC+01:00 (CET)
  - Summer (DST): UTC+02:00 (CEST)
- INSEE/Postal code: 23050 /23160
- ^{1} French Land Register data, which excludes lakes, ponds, glaciers > 1 km^{2} (0.386 sq mi or 247 acres) and river estuaries.

La Chapelle-Baloue (French pronunciation: [la ʃapɛl balu]; Occitan: La Chapèle) is a commune in the Creuse department in the Nouvelle-Aquitaine region in central France.

== Geography ==
A farming area comprising the village and a few small hamlets situated at the junction of the rivers Sédelle and Brézentine, some 19 miles (31 km) northwest of Guéret at the junction of the D69 and the D72 roads. The commune lies on the pilgrimage route known as St James's Way.

== Population ==
Historical population
Year	Pop.	±% p.a.
1968	264	—
1975	228	−2.07%
1982	197	−2.07%
1990	151	−3.27%
1999	143	−0.60%
2007	135	−0.72%
2012	140	+0.73%
2017	135	−0.72%
2023	114	−2.78%
Source: INSEE

== Sights ==
- The church of Notre-Dame-de-Lorette, dating from the twelfth century.
- The chateau and some ancient fortifications.
- A fourteenth-century stone cross.

== See also ==
- Communes of the Creuse department
