= Colondannes =

Commune in Nouvelle-Aquitaine, France

- Commune
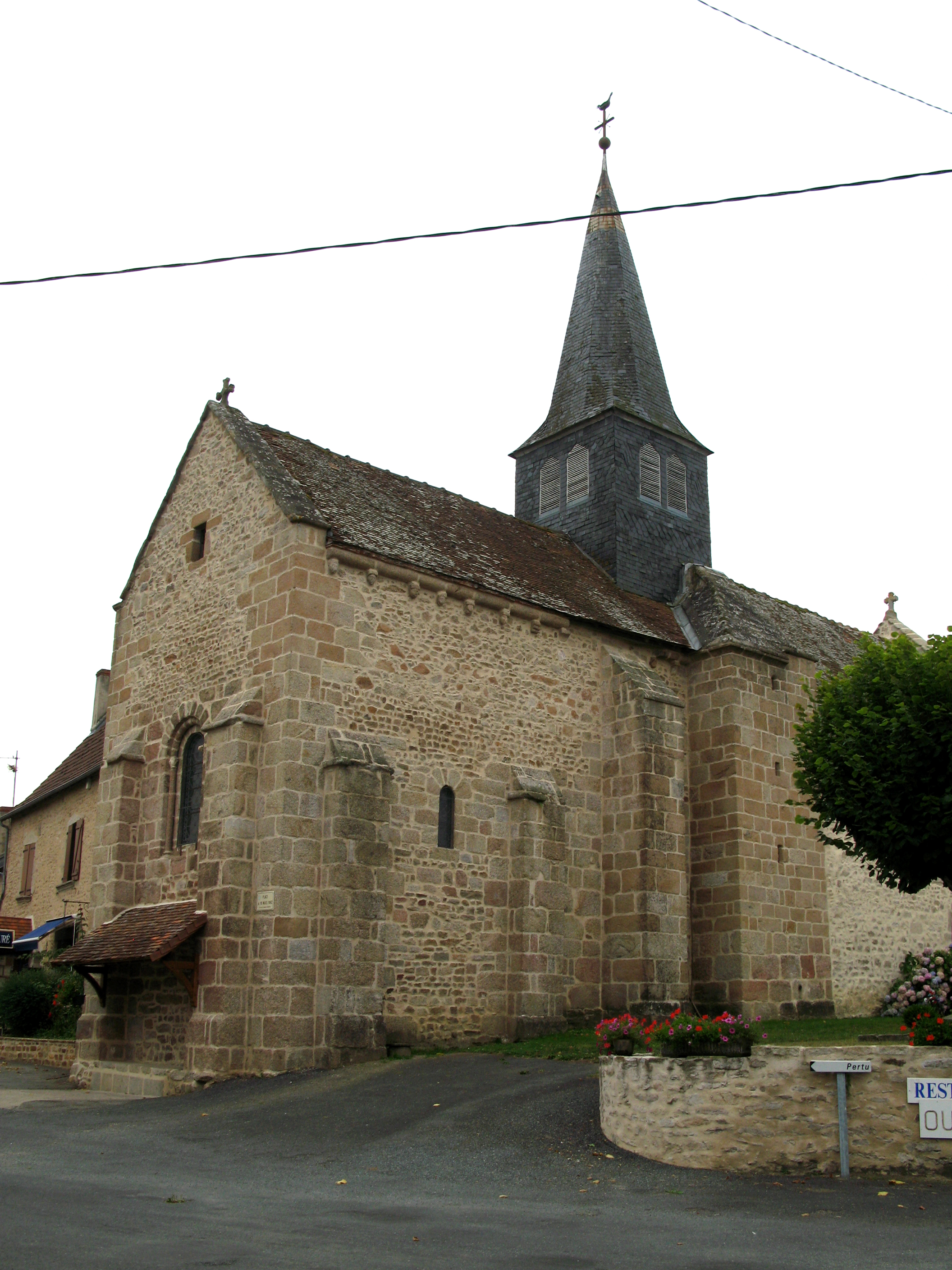
- The church in Colondannes

- Coat of arms
- Location of Colondannes
- Location within France Location within Nouvelle-Aquitaine
- Coordinates: 46°17′24″N 1°36′44″E
- Country: France
- Region: Nouvelle-Aquitaine
- Department: Creuse
- Arrondissement: Guéret
- Canton: Dun-le-Palestel
- Intercommunality: CC Pays Dunois

Government
  - Mayor (2020–2026): François Parbaud
- Area^{1}: 10.70 km^{2} (4.13 sq mi)
- Elevation: 366 m (1,201 ft)
- Highest elevation: 431 m (1,414 ft)
- Lowest elevation: 283 m (928 ft)
- Population (2023): 289
  - Density: 27.0/km^{2} (70.0/sq mi)
- Time zone: UTC+01:00 (CET)
  - Summer (DST): UTC+02:00 (CEST)
- INSEE/Postal code: 23065 /23800
- ^{1} French Land Register data, which excludes lakes, ponds, glaciers > 1 km^{2} (0.386 sq mi or 247 acres) and river estuaries.

Colondannes (French pronunciation: [kɔlɔ̃dan]; Occitan: Colonzanas) is a commune in the Creuse department in the Nouvelle-Aquitaine region in central France.

== Geography ==
A farming area comprising the village and several hamlets, situated some 16 miles (26 km) northwest of Guéret at the junction of the D14, D49 and the D951 roads.

== Population ==
Historical population
Year	Pop.	±% p.a.
1968	376	—
1975	342	−1.34%
1982	335	−0.29%
1990	347	+0.44%
1999	305	−1.42%
2007	314	+0.36%
2012	282	−2.13%
2017	265	−1.24%
2023	289	+1.46%
Source: INSEE

== Sights ==
- The church, dating from the twelfth century, houses some 18th-century frescoes. In the centre of the choir vault the dove of the Holy Spirit emerges from a radiant cloud. The four evangelists can be seen on the north and south walls of the vault. At the entrance to the choir at the north-west there is an image of St. Matthew soaking a pen in an inkwell held by an angel. To the north-east is Saint Luke in profile holding an inscribed phylactery and accompanied by an eagle. To the south-east we have St. Luke writing in a book and accompanied by his symbol, an ox. At the south-west we see St. Mark placing his left hand on a book and accompanied by his symbol, the lion. Under the blind arcade of the north chapel two Sacred Hearts inflamed and pierced by a dagger can be seen on a background of radiant clouds.

== See also ==
- Communes of the Creuse department
