= Saint-Sulpice-le-Dunois =

Commune in Nouvelle-Aquitaine, France

- Commune
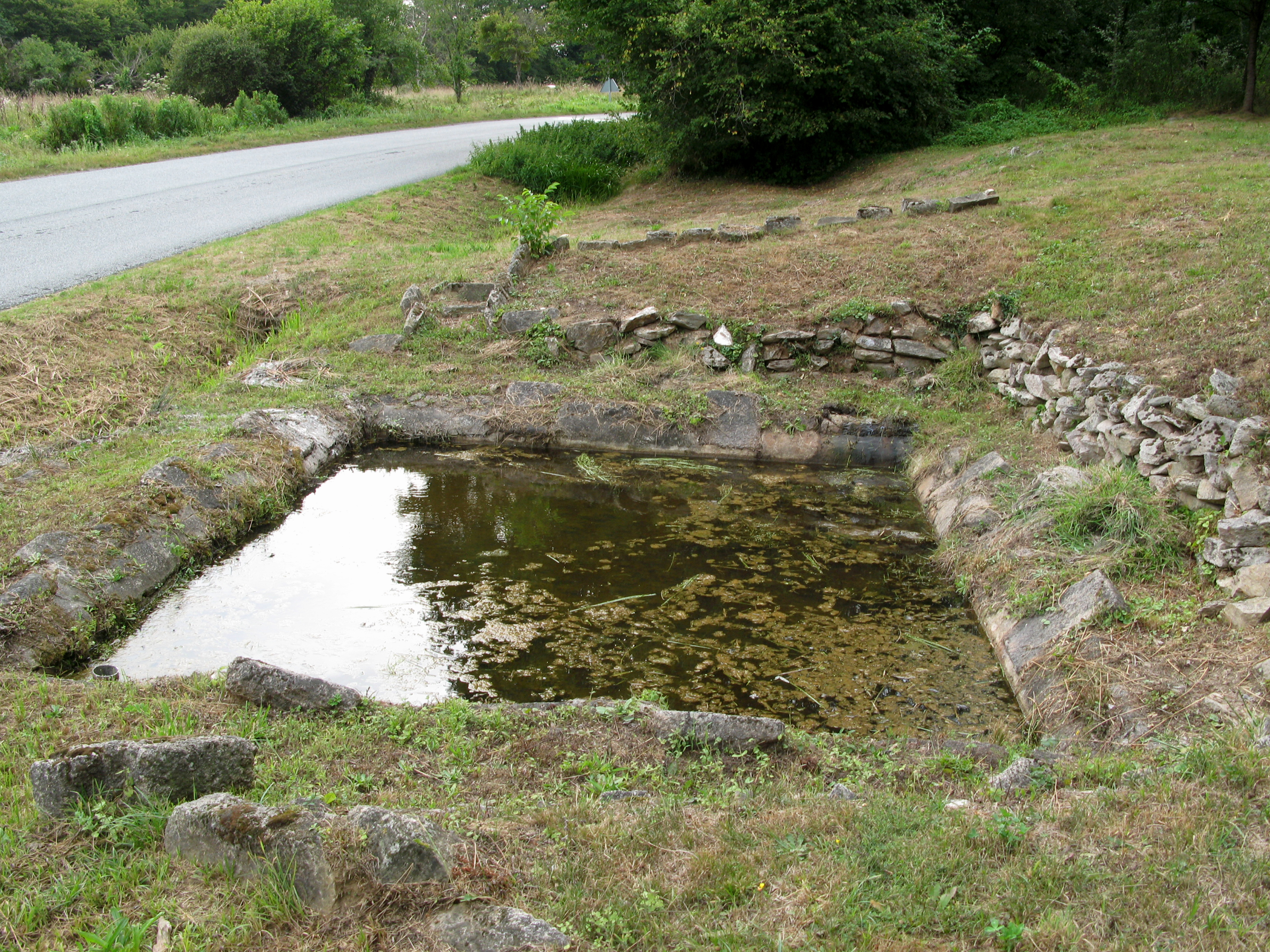
- The abandoned washing pool, on the north side of the D15 road
- Location of Saint-Sulpice-le-Dunois
- Location within France Location within Nouvelle-Aquitaine
- Coordinates: 46°17′59″N 1°43′55″E
- Country: France
- Region: Nouvelle-Aquitaine
- Department: Creuse
- Arrondissement: Guéret
- Canton: Dun-le-Palestel
- Intercommunality: CC Pays Dunois

Government
  - Mayor (2020–2026): Bruno Dardaillon
- Area^{1}: 30.85 km^{2} (11.91 sq mi)
- Elevation: 356 m (1,168 ft)
- Highest elevation: 546 m (1,791 ft)
- Lowest elevation: 218 m (715 ft)
- Population (2023): 564
  - Density: 18.3/km^{2} (47.4/sq mi)
- Time zone: UTC+01:00 (CET)
  - Summer (DST): UTC+02:00 (CEST)
- INSEE/Postal code: 23244 /23800
- ^{1} French Land Register data, which excludes lakes, ponds, glaciers > 1 km^{2} (0.386 sq mi or 247 acres) and river estuaries.

Saint-Sulpice-le-Dunois (French pronunciation: [sɛ̃ sylpis lə dynwa]; Limousin: Sent Sepise) is a commune in the Creuse department located in central France.

== Population ==
Historical population
Year	Pop.	±% p.a.
1968	913	—
1975	795	−1.96%
1982	750	−0.83%
1990	698	−0.89%
1999	634	−1.06%
2007	633	−0.02%
2012	665	+0.99%
2017	607	−1.81%
2023	564	−1.22%
Source: INSEE

== See also ==
- Communes of the Creuse department
