= Fresselines =

Commune in Nouvelle-Aquitaine, France

- Commune
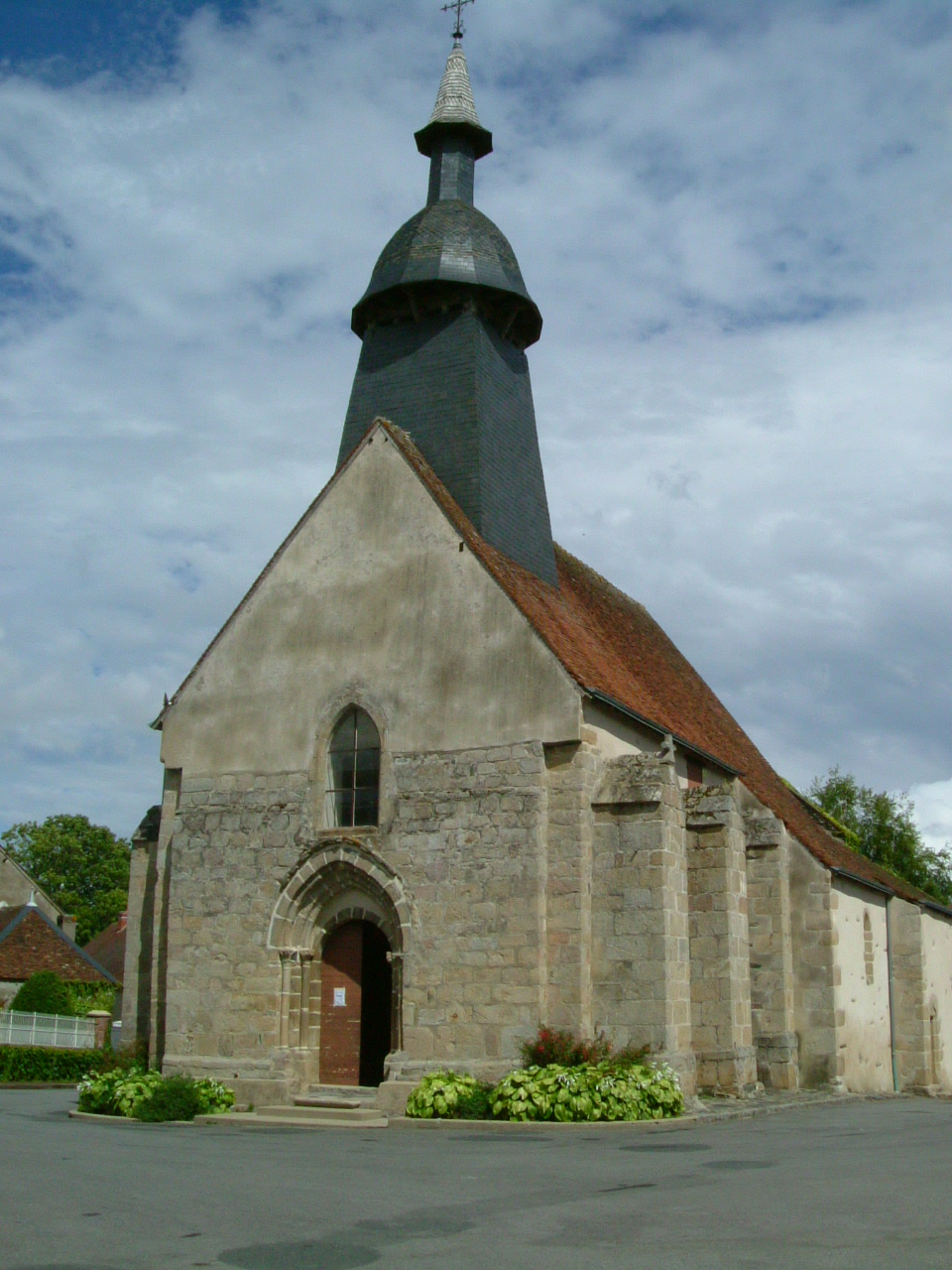
- The church in Fresselines
- Location of Fresselines
- Location within France Location within Nouvelle-Aquitaine
- Coordinates: 46°23′01″N 1°40′58″E
- Country: France
- Region: Nouvelle-Aquitaine
- Department: Creuse
- Arrondissement: Guéret
- Canton: Dun-le-Palestel
- Intercommunality: CC Pays Dunois

Government
  - Mayor (2024–2026): Jean-Claude Dugenest
- Area^{1}: 30.78 km^{2} (11.88 sq mi)
- Elevation: 200 m (660 ft)
- Highest elevation: 366 m (1,201 ft)
- Lowest elevation: 200 m (660 ft)
- Population (2023): 509
  - Density: 16.5/km^{2} (42.8/sq mi)
- Time zone: UTC+01:00 (CET)
  - Summer (DST): UTC+02:00 (CEST)
- INSEE/Postal code: 23087 /23450
- ^{1} French Land Register data, which excludes lakes, ponds, glaciers > 1 km^{2} (0.386 sq mi or 247 acres) and river estuaries.

Fresselines (French pronunciation: [fʁɛslin]; Occitan: Fraisselinas) is a commune in the Creuse department in the Nouvelle-Aquitaine region in central France.

== Geography ==
A tourism and farming village situated some 20 miles (32 km) northwest of Guéret, at the junction of the D76 and the D44 roads, where the river Petite Creuse joins the Creuse.

== Population ==
Historical population
Year	Pop.	±% p.a.
1968	1,123	—
1975	983	−1.88%
1982	846	−2.12%
1990	735	−1.74%
1999	671	−1.01%
2007	631	−0.77%
2012	559	−2.39%
2017	498	−2.28%
2023	509	+0.36%
Source: INSEE

== Sights ==
- The church of St.Julien, dating from the twelfth century.
- The two 15th-century châteaux of Puyguillon and Vervix
- Two 15th-century chapels.

== Personalities ==
- Maurice Rollinat (1846–1903), poet, lived here.
- Gustave Geffroy, (1855–1926), writer, lived here.
- Claude Monet, painter, spent much time here.

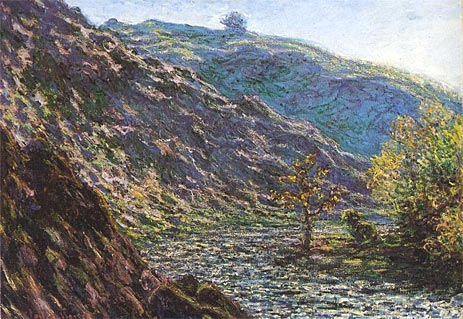
La Petite Creuse by Monet

== See also ==
- Communes of the Creuse department
