= Sagnat =

Commune in Nouvelle-Aquitaine, France

- Commune
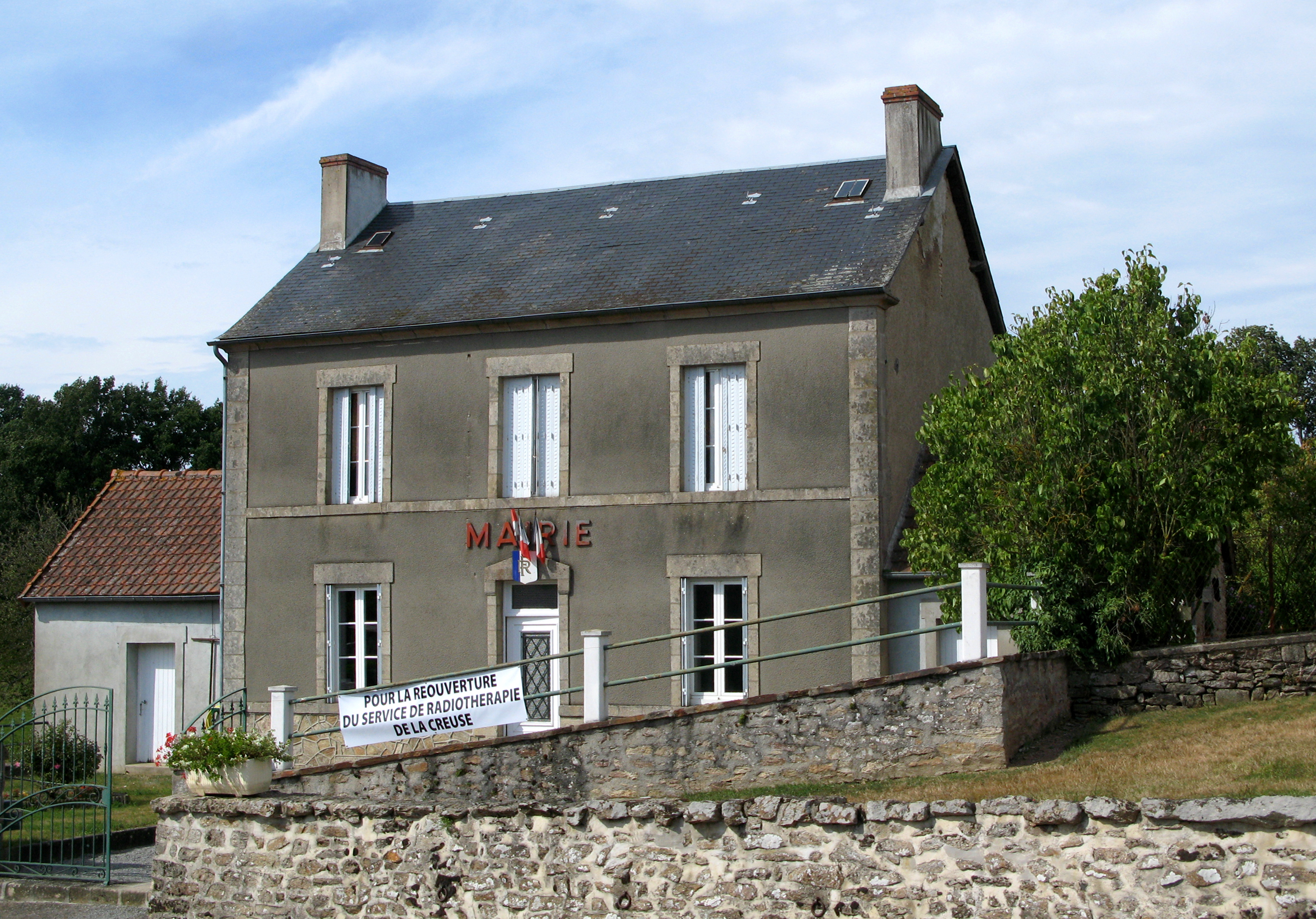
- Town hall

- Coat of arms
- Location of Sagnat
- Location within France Location within Nouvelle-Aquitaine
- Coordinates: 46°18′18″N 1°37′45″E
- Country: France
- Region: Nouvelle-Aquitaine
- Department: Creuse
- Arrondissement: Guéret
- Canton: Dun-le-Palestel
- Intercommunality: CC Pays Dunois

Government
  - Mayor (2020–2026): Philippe Brigand
- Area^{1}: 11.81 km^{2} (4.56 sq mi)
- Elevation: 312 m (1,024 ft)
- Highest elevation: 362 m (1,188 ft)
- Lowest elevation: 278 m (912 ft)
- Population (2023): 197
  - Density: 16.7/km^{2} (43.2/sq mi)
- Time zone: UTC+01:00 (CET)
  - Summer (DST): UTC+02:00 (CEST)
- INSEE/Postal code: 23166 /23800
- ^{1} French Land Register data, which excludes lakes, ponds, glaciers > 1 km^{2} (0.386 sq mi or 247 acres) and river estuaries.

Sagnat (French pronunciation: [saɲa]; Occitan: Sanhac) is a commune in the Creuse department in the Nouvelle-Aquitaine region in central France.

== Geography ==
A farming area, comprising the village and several hamlets situated by the banks of the Brézentine river, some 16 miles (26 km) northwest of Guéret, at the junction of the D49 and the D46 with the D69 road.

== Population ==
Historical population
Year	Pop.	±% p.a.
1968	301	—
1975	268	−1.65%
1982	233	−1.98%
1990	203	−1.71%
1999	188	−0.85%
2007	203	+0.96%
2012	200	−0.30%
2017	192	−0.81%
2023	197	+0.43%
Source: INSEE

== Sights ==
- The church, dating from the twelfth century.
- The ancient stone cross on the square.

== See also ==
- Communes of the Creuse department
