= Cressat =

Commune in Nouvelle-Aquitaine, France

- Commune
- Coat of arms
- Location of Cressat
- Location within France Location within Nouvelle-Aquitaine
- Coordinates: 46°08′26″N 2°06′33″E
- Country: France
- Region: Nouvelle-Aquitaine
- Department: Creuse
- Arrondissement: Aubusson
- Canton: Gouzon
- Intercommunality: CC Creuse Confluence

Government
  - Mayor (2020–2026): Josiane Chamberaud
- Area^{1}: 32.68 km^{2} (12.62 sq mi)
- Elevation: 520 m (1,710 ft)
- Highest elevation: 546 m (1,791 ft)
- Lowest elevation: 340 m (1,120 ft)
- Population (2023): 512
  - Density: 15.7/km^{2} (40.6/sq mi)
- Time zone: UTC+01:00 (CET)
  - Summer (DST): UTC+02:00 (CEST)
- INSEE/Postal code: 23068 /23140
- ^{1} French Land Register data, which excludes lakes, ponds, glaciers > 1 km^{2} (0.386 sq mi or 247 acres) and river estuaries.

Cressat is a commune in the Creuse department in the Nouvelle-Aquitaine region in central France.

== Geography ==
A farming area comprising the village and several hamlets, situated some 12 miles (19 km) east of Guéret at the junction of the D50 with the D13 and the D990 roads. The river Creuse flows past on the southwestern boundary of the commune.

== Population ==
Historical population
Year	Pop.	±% p.a.
1968	765	—
1975	702	−1.22%
1982	647	−1.16%
1990	552	−1.97%
1999	523	−0.60%
2007	562	+0.90%
2012	559	−0.11%
2017	553	−0.22%
2023	512	−1.28%
Source: INSEE

== Sights ==
- The church, dating from the fifteenth century.
- The stained glass factory / workshop.

== See also ==
- Communes of the Creuse department
