= Saint-Germain-Beaupré =

Commune in Nouvelle-Aquitaine, France

- Commune
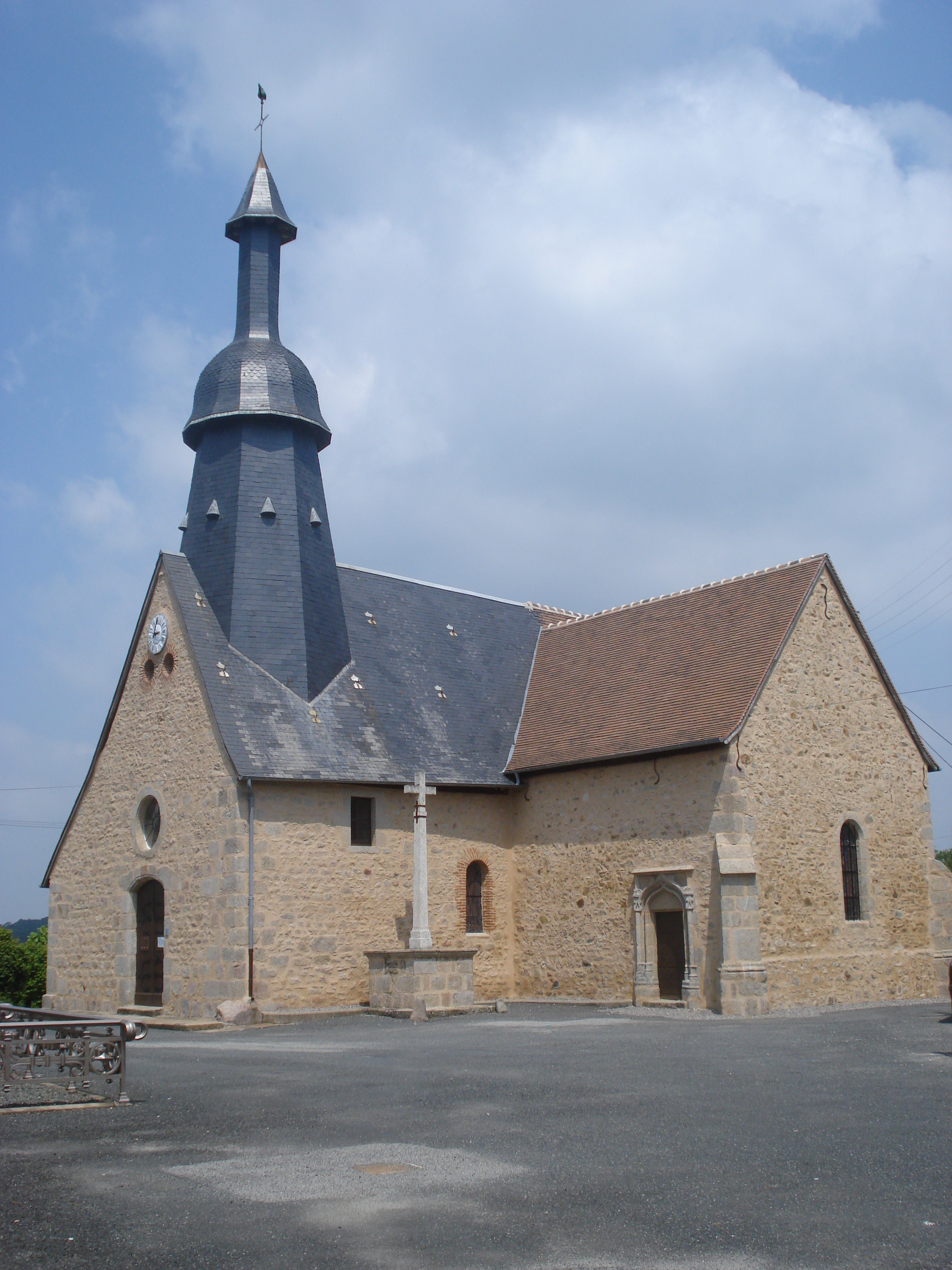
- The church in Saint-Germain-Beaupré

- Coat of arms
- Location of Saint-Germain-Beaupré
- Location within France Location within Nouvelle-Aquitaine
- Coordinates: 46°18′31″N 1°32′45″E
- Country: France
- Region: Nouvelle-Aquitaine
- Department: Creuse
- Arrondissement: Guéret
- Canton: Dun-le-Palestel
- Intercommunality: CC Pays Sostranien

Government
  - Mayor (2020–2026): Geneviève Barat
- Area^{1}: 17.06 km^{2} (6.59 sq mi)
- Elevation: 330 m (1,080 ft)
- Highest elevation: 381 m (1,250 ft)
- Lowest elevation: 279 m (915 ft)
- Population (2023): 352
  - Density: 20.6/km^{2} (53.4/sq mi)
- Time zone: UTC+01:00 (CET)
  - Summer (DST): UTC+02:00 (CEST)
- INSEE/Postal code: 23199 /23160
- ^{1} French Land Register data, which excludes lakes, ponds, glaciers > 1 km^{2} (0.386 sq mi or 247 acres) and river estuaries.

Saint-Germain-Beaupré (French pronunciation: [sɛ̃ ʒɛʁmɛ̃ bopʁe]; Limousin: Sent German) is a commune in the Creuse department in central France.

== Population ==
Historical population
Year	Pop.	±% p.a.
1968	571	—
1975	448	−3.41%
1982	415	−1.09%
1990	406	−0.27%
1999	382	−0.67%
2007	391	+0.29%
2012	456	+3.12%
2017	436	−0.89%
2023	352	−3.50%
Source: INSEE

== See also ==
- Château de Saint-Germain-Beaupré
- Communes of the Creuse department
