= Chambon-Sainte-Croix =

Commune in Nouvelle-Aquitaine, France

- Commune
- Location of Chambon-Sainte-Croix
- Location within France Location within Nouvelle-Aquitaine
- Coordinates: 46°21′23″N 1°46′32″E
- Country: France
- Region: Nouvelle-Aquitaine
- Department: Creuse
- Arrondissement: Guéret
- Canton: Bonnat
- Intercommunality: CC Pays Dunois

Government
  - Mayor (2022–2026): Patrick Tixier
- Area^{1}: 6.66 km^{2} (2.57 sq mi)
- Elevation: 281 m (922 ft)
- Highest elevation: 341 m (1,119 ft)
- Lowest elevation: 218 m (715 ft)
- Population (2023): 89
  - Density: 13/km^{2} (35/sq mi)
- Time zone: UTC+01:00 (CET)
  - Summer (DST): UTC+02:00 (CEST)
- INSEE/Postal code: 23044 /23220
- ^{1} French Land Register data, which excludes lakes, ponds, glaciers > 1 km^{2} (0.386 sq mi or 247 acres) and river estuaries.

Chambon-Sainte-Croix (French pronunciation: [ʃɑ̃bɔ̃ sɛ̃t kʁwa]; Occitan: Chambon Senta Crotz) is a commune in the Creuse department in the Nouvelle-Aquitaine region in central France.

== Geography ==
A small farming and forestry village situated some 15 miles (24 km) northwest of Guéret, at the junction of the D22, D46 and the D951 roads. The Petite Creuse river forms the northern and eastern borders of the commune.

== Population ==
Historical population
Year	Pop.	±% p.a.
1968	157	—
1975	138	−1.83%
1982	108	−3.44%
1990	84	−3.09%
1999	86	+0.26%
2007	95	+1.25%
2012	90	−1.08%
2017	75	−3.58%
2023	89	+2.89%
Source: INSEE

== Sights ==
- The church of St. Croix, dating from the eleventh century.

== See also ==
- Communes of the Creuse department
