= Creuset =

Creuset is a French word meaning "crucible." As a proper name, it may refer to:

- Le Creuset, French–Belgian cookware manufacturer
- Rau Le Creuset, fictional character from the Japanese anime Mobile Suit Gundam SEED

== See also ==
- Creusot (disambiguation)
