= CRESST =

CRESST may refer to:

- National Center for Research on Evaluation, Standards, and Student Testing, an American research partnership
- Cryogenic Rare Event Search with Superconducting Thermometers, a European physics group
