= Creuse (river) =

River in France

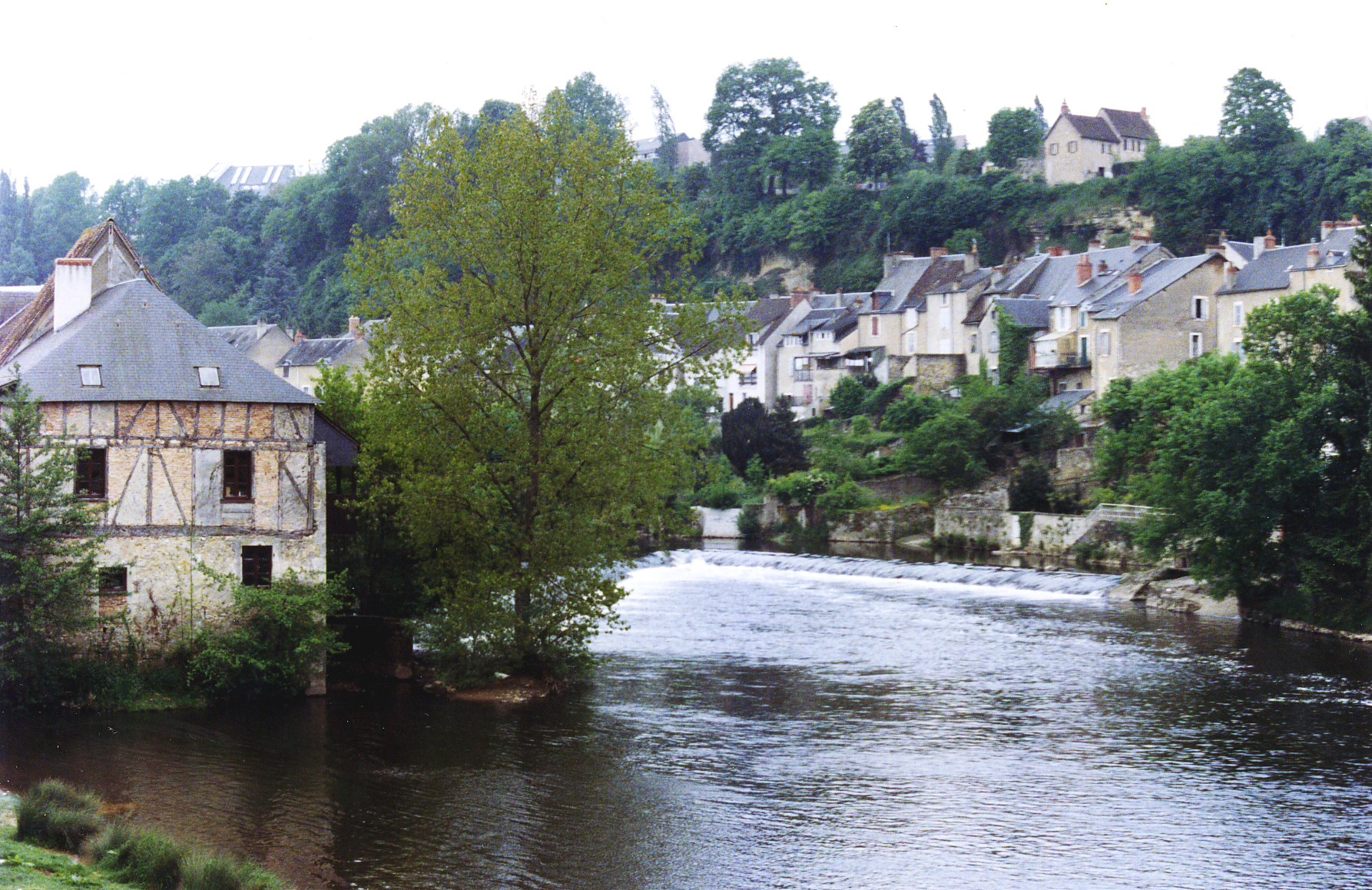
- La Creuse in Argenton-sur-Creuse

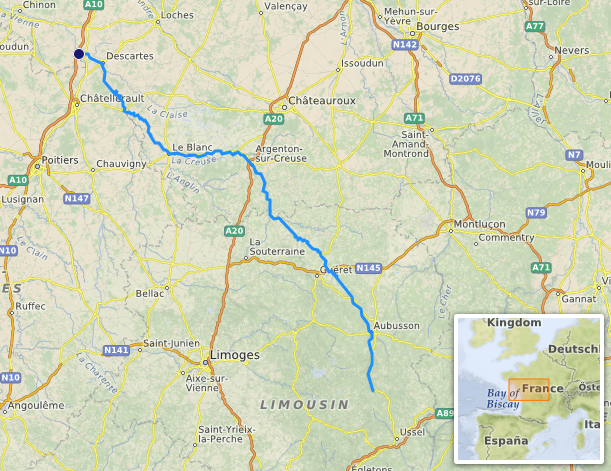
- Native name: La Creuse (French)

Location
- Country: France

Physical characteristics
- Source
  - location: Plateau de Millevaches
  - elevation: 932 m (3,058 ft)
- Mouth
  - location: Vienne
  - coordinates: 47°0′22″N 0°34′7″E
- Length: 263 km (163 mi)
- Basin size: 9,570 km^{2} (3,690 mi^{2})
- Discharge
  - average: 81 m^{3}/s (2,900 cu ft/s)

Basin features
- Progression: Vienne→ Loire→ Atlantic Ocean

The Creuse (French pronunciation: [kʁøz]; Occitan: Cruesa) is a 263-kilometre (163 mi) long river in western France, a tributary of the Vienne. Its source is in the Plateau de Millevaches, a north-western extension of the Massif Central.

== Course ==
The Creuse flows northwest through the following departments and towns:

- Creuse department (named after the river): Aubusson.
- Indre department: Argenton-sur-Creuse, Le Blanc.
- Indre-et-Loire department : Yzeures-sur-Creuse, Descartes
- Vienne department: La Roche-Posay

The Creuse flows into the Vienne about 20 kilometres (12 mi) north of Châtellerault. It receives its longest tributary, the Gartempe, in La Roche-Posay.

The Creuse valley is the setting for paintings by the so-called Crozant School, including works by Armand Guillaumin and a series of vivid landscapes by the Bordeaux artist Alfred Smith.

== Dams and lakes ==
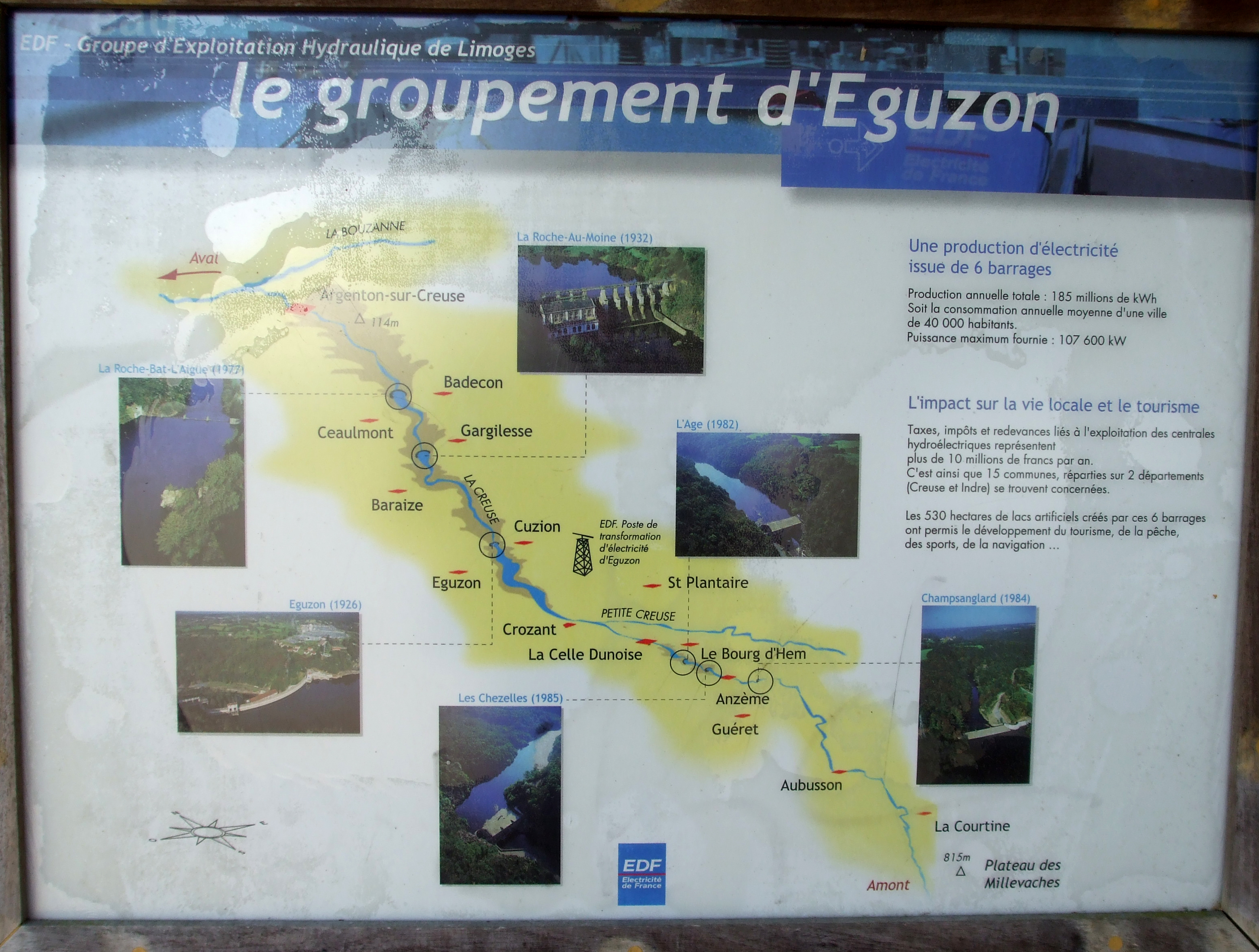
Diagram of the Creuse Dams

There are six hydroelectric dams on the river. Three are in the Creuse département with one at Chambon-Sainte-Croix above Anzême, one at Les Chezelles near Le Bourg-d'Hem and one at L'Âge upstream of La Celle-Dunoise. The remaining three are in the Indre including the Éguzon Dam which was opened in 1926 and was, at the time, the largest dam in Europe. The lakes created by the dams are popular tourist destinations and several have artificial beaches and leisure facilities.

== Main tributaries ==
Left bank:

- Beauze
- Sédelle
- Gartempe

Right bank:

- Rozeille
- Petite Creuse
- Bouzanne
- Bouzanteuil
- Suin
- Claise
- Esves
