= Saint-Maurice =

Saint-Maurice is the name or part of the name of places. It refers to the legendary Saint Maurice.

== Places ==
=== Canada ===
- Saint-Maurice (Lower Canada electoral district), a constituency 1792–1838
- Saint Maurice (Province of Canada electoral district), a constituency in Canada East 1841–1867
- Saint-Maurice (federal electoral district), a former federal electoral district represented in the House of Commons, in Quebec 1867–1896, 1968–2004
- Saint-Maurice River in Quebec
- Saint-Maurice (provincial electoral district), in Quebec 1867–2018
- Saint-Maurice, Quebec, a parish municipality in the Mauricie region of the province of Quebec
- Saint-Maurice, a community within the City of La Tuque, Quebec
- Saint-Maurice, a community within Wellington Parish, New Brunswick
- Saint-Maurice-de-Dalquier, a community within the City of Amos, Quebec
- Saint-Maurice-de-l'Échouerie, a community within the City of Gaspé, Quebec

=== France ===
- Bourg-Saint-Maurice, Savoie
- Saint-Maurice, Haute-Marne
- Saint-Maurice, Nièvre
- Saint-Maurice, Puy-de-Dôme
- Saint-Maurice, Bas-Rhin
- Saint-Maurice, Val-de-Marne
- Saint-Maurice-aux-Forges, in the Meurthe-et-Moselle department
- Saint-Maurice-aux-Riches-Hommes, in the Yonne department
- Saint-Maurice-Colombier, in the Doubs department
- Saint-Maurice-Crillat, in the Jura department
- Saint-Maurice-d'Ardèche, in the Ardèche department
- Saint-Maurice-d'Ételan, in the Seine-Maritime department
- Saint-Maurice-d'Ibie, in the Ardèche department
- Saint-Maurice-de-Beynost, in the Ain department
- Saint-Maurice-de-Cazevieille, in the Gard department
- Saint-Maurice-de-Gourdans, in the Ain department
- Saint-Maurice-de-Lestapel, in the Lot-et-Garonne department
- Saint-Maurice-de-Lignon, in the Haute-Loire department
- Saint-Maurice-de-Rémens, in the Ain department
- Saint-Maurice-de-Rotherens, in the Savoie department
- Saint-Maurice-de-Satonnay, in the Saône-et-Loire department
- Saint-Maurice-de-Tavernole, in the Charente-Maritime department
- Saint-Maurice-de-Ventalon, in the Lozère department
- Saint-Maurice-des-Champs, in the Saône-et-Loire department
- Saint-Maurice-des-Lions, in the Charente department
- Saint-Maurice-des-Noues, in the Vendée department
- Saint-Maurice-du-Désert, in the Orne department
- Saint-Maurice-en-Chalencon, in the Ardèche department
- Saint-Maurice-en-Cotentin, in the Manche department
- Saint-Maurice-en-Gourgois, in the Loire department
- Saint-Maurice-en-Quercy, in the Lot department
- Saint-Maurice-en-Rivière, in the Saône-et-Loire department
- Saint-Maurice-en-Trièves, in the Isère department
- Saint-Maurice-en-Valgodemard, in the Hautes-Alpes department
- Saint-Maurice-la-Clouère, in the Vienne department
- Saint-Maurice-l'Exil, in the Isère department
- Saint-Maurice-la-Fougereuse, in the Deux-Sèvres department
- Saint-Maurice-la-Souterraine, in the Creuse department
- Saint-Maurice-le-Girard, in the Vendée department
- Saint-Maurice-le-Vieil, in the Yonne department
- Saint-Maurice-les-Brousses, in the Haute-Vienne department
- Saint-Maurice-lès-Charencey, in the Orne department
- Saint-Maurice-lès-Châteauneuf, in the Saône-et-Loire department
- Saint-Maurice-lès-Couches, in the Saône-et-Loire department
- Saint-Maurice-Montcouronne, in the Essonne department
- Saint-Maurice-Navacelles, in the Hérault department
- Saint-Maurice-près-Crocq, in the Creuse department
- Saint-Maurice-près-Pionsat, in the Puy-de-Dôme department
- Saint-Maurice-Saint-Germain, in the Eure-et-Loir department
- Saint-Maurice-sous-les-Côtes, in the Meuse department
- Saint-Maurice-sur-Adour, in the Landes department
- Saint-Maurice-sur-Aveyron, in the Loiret department
- Saint-Maurice-sur-Dargoire, in the Rhône department
- Saint-Maurice-sur-Eygues, in the Drôme department
- Saint-Maurice-sur-Fessard, in the Loiret department
- Saint-Maurice-sur-Huisne, in the Orne department
- Saint-Maurice-sur-Mortagne, in the Vosges department
- Saint-Maurice-sur-Moselle, in the Vosges department
- Saint-Maurice-sur-Vingeanne, in the Côte-d'Or department
- Saint-Maurice-Thizouaille, in the Yonne department

=== Switzerland ===
- Saint-Maurice, Switzerland (Roman Agaunum) is a municipality and a district in the Valais
  - Saint-Maurice District
  - St. Maurice's Abbey
- Saint-Maurice, Collonge-Bellerive, a locality in the municipality Collonge-Bellerive

=== United States ===
- Saint Maurice, Indiana, a town
- Saint Maurice, Louisiana, an unincorporated community

== Other uses ==
- Saint Maurice (Master Theodoric), a c.1360 Bohemian oil tempera on beech board painting

== See also ==
- Maurice (disambiguation)
- St. Moritz (disambiguation)
