= Morrice =

Morrice is a surname, predominantly of Scottish origin. Notable people with the name include:

- Graeme Morrice (born 1959), Scottish politician
- Ian Morrice, Australian CEO
- James Wilson Morrice (1865–1924), Canadian landscape painter
- Jane Morrice (born 1954), Irish politician
- John Morrice (1811-1875), Australian politician
- Lars Morrice (born c. 1996), New Zealander rugby player
- Mike Morrice, Canadian politician
- Natasha Morrice (born 2000), British rower
- Nellie Morrice (1881–1963), Australian army and bush nurse administrator
- Norman Morrice (1931-2008), British dancer and choreographer
- Roger Morrice (1628–1702), English Puritan minister
- Salmon Morrice (1672-1740), Royal Navy officer
- Susan Morrice (born 1952), Northern Irish geologist and explorer
- Thomas Morrice (17th century), English politician
- Trevor Morrice (born 1991), Canadian ski jumper

== See also ==
- Maurice (disambiguation)
- Morice (disambiguation)
- Morris (disambiguation)
