= Maurice =

Maurice most often refers to:

- Maurice (name), a given name and surname, including a list of people with the name

Maurice may also refer to:

== Places ==
- Île Maurice or Mauritius, an island country in the Indian Ocean
- Maurice, Iowa, a city
- Maurice, Louisiana, a village
- Maurice River, a tributary of the Delaware River in New Jersey

== Other uses ==
- Maurice (2015 film), a Canadian short drama film
- Maurice (horse), a Thoroughbred racehorse
- Maurice (novel), 1913, by E. M. Forster, published in 1971
  - Maurice (1987 film), a British film based on the novel
- Maurice (Shelley), a children's story by Mary Shelley
- Maurice, a character from the Madagascar franchise
- Maurices, an American retail clothing chain
- Maurice or Maryse, a type of cooking spatula

== See also ==
- Church of Saint Maurice (disambiguation)
- French submarine Maurice Callot
- Maurice Debate, a 1918 debate in the British House of Commons
- Maurice Lacroix, Swiss manufacturer of mechanical timepieces, clocks, and watches
- Mauricie, Quebec, Canada
- Moritz (disambiguation)
- Morrice, a surname
- Morris (disambiguation)
- Saint-Maurice (disambiguation)
