= Réaux =

Réaux may refer to:

- Réaux, Charente-Maritime, a commune of the Charente-Maritime departement in France

== People with the surname ==
- Gédéon Tallemant des Réaux (1619–1692), French writer
- Raymond Reaux (1940–2021), French cyclist

== See also ==
- Reaux, Reaux, Reaux Your Boat, a short film in the Inspector series of theatrical cartoons
