= Saint-Priest-la-Feuille =

Commune in Nouvelle-Aquitaine, France

- Commune
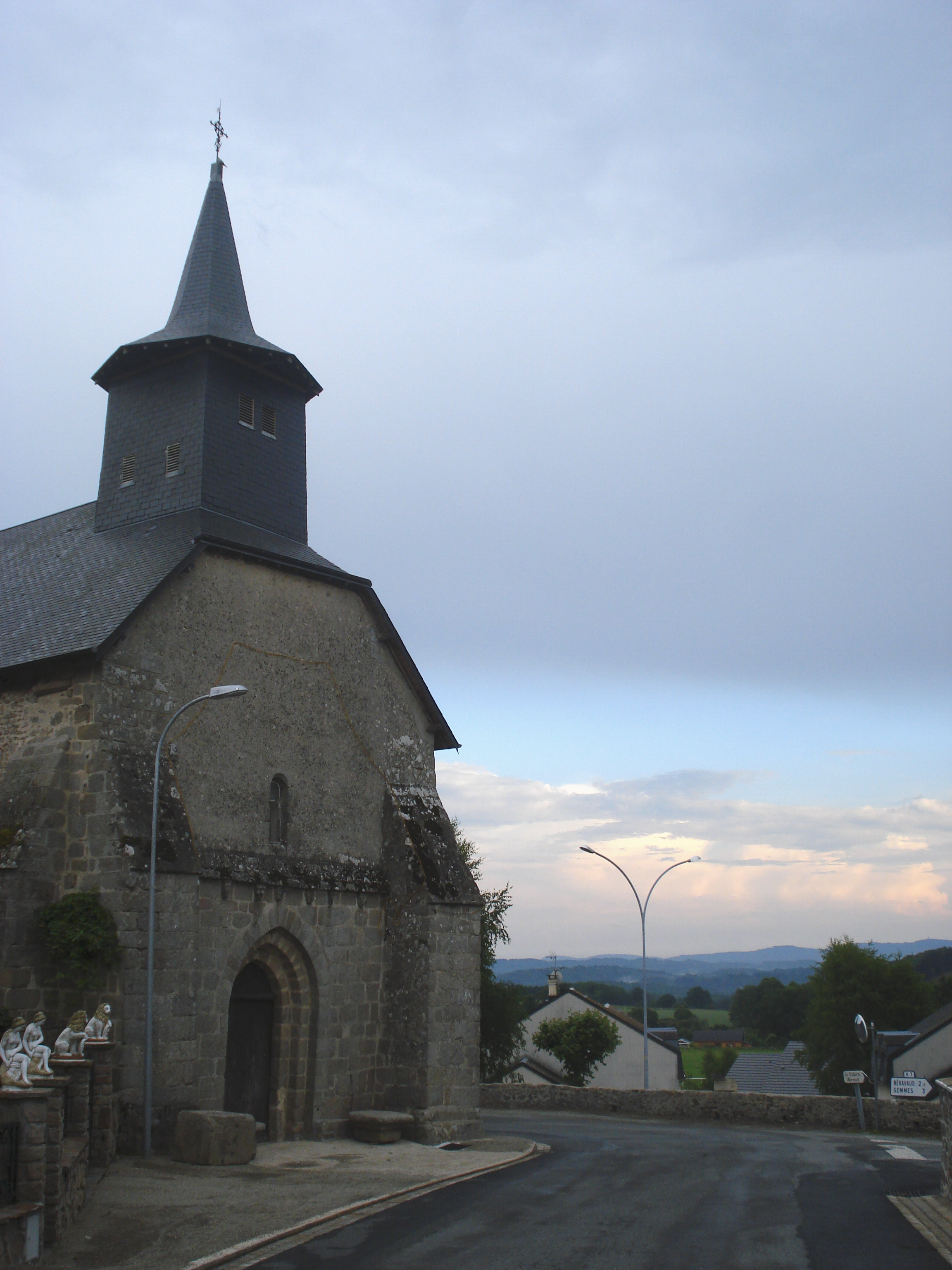
- The church in Saint-Priest-la-Feuille
- Location of Saint-Priest-la-Feuille
- Location within France Location within Nouvelle-Aquitaine
- Coordinates: 46°12′09″N 1°32′10″E
- Country: France
- Region: Nouvelle-Aquitaine
- Department: Creuse
- Arrondissement: Guéret
- Canton: La Souterraine
- Intercommunality: CC Pays Sostranien

Government
  - Mayor (2020–2026): Josiane Vigroux Aufort
- Area^{1}: 27.44 km^{2} (10.59 sq mi)
- Elevation: 456 m (1,496 ft)
- Highest elevation: 456 m (1,496 ft)
- Lowest elevation: 328 m (1,076 ft)
- Population (2023): 718
  - Density: 26.2/km^{2} (67.8/sq mi)
- Time zone: UTC+01:00 (CET)
  - Summer (DST): UTC+02:00 (CEST)
- INSEE/Postal code: 23235 /23300
- ^{1} French Land Register data, which excludes lakes, ponds, glaciers > 1 km^{2} (0.386 sq mi or 247 acres) and river estuaries.

Saint-Priest-la-Feuille (French pronunciation: [sɛ̃ pʁijɛ(st) la fœj]; Occitan: Sant Prit la Fuèlha) is a commune in the Creuse department in central France.

== Geography ==
The river Semme has its source in the commune.

== Population ==
Historical population
Year	Pop.	±% p.a.
1968	790	—
1975	689	−1.94%
1982	638	−1.09%
1990	635	−0.06%
1999	619	−0.28%
2007	671	+1.01%
2012	800	+3.58%
2017	771	−0.74%
2023	718	−1.18%
Source: INSEE

== See also ==
- Communes of the Creuse department
