= Moings =

- Part of Réaux-sur-Trèfle
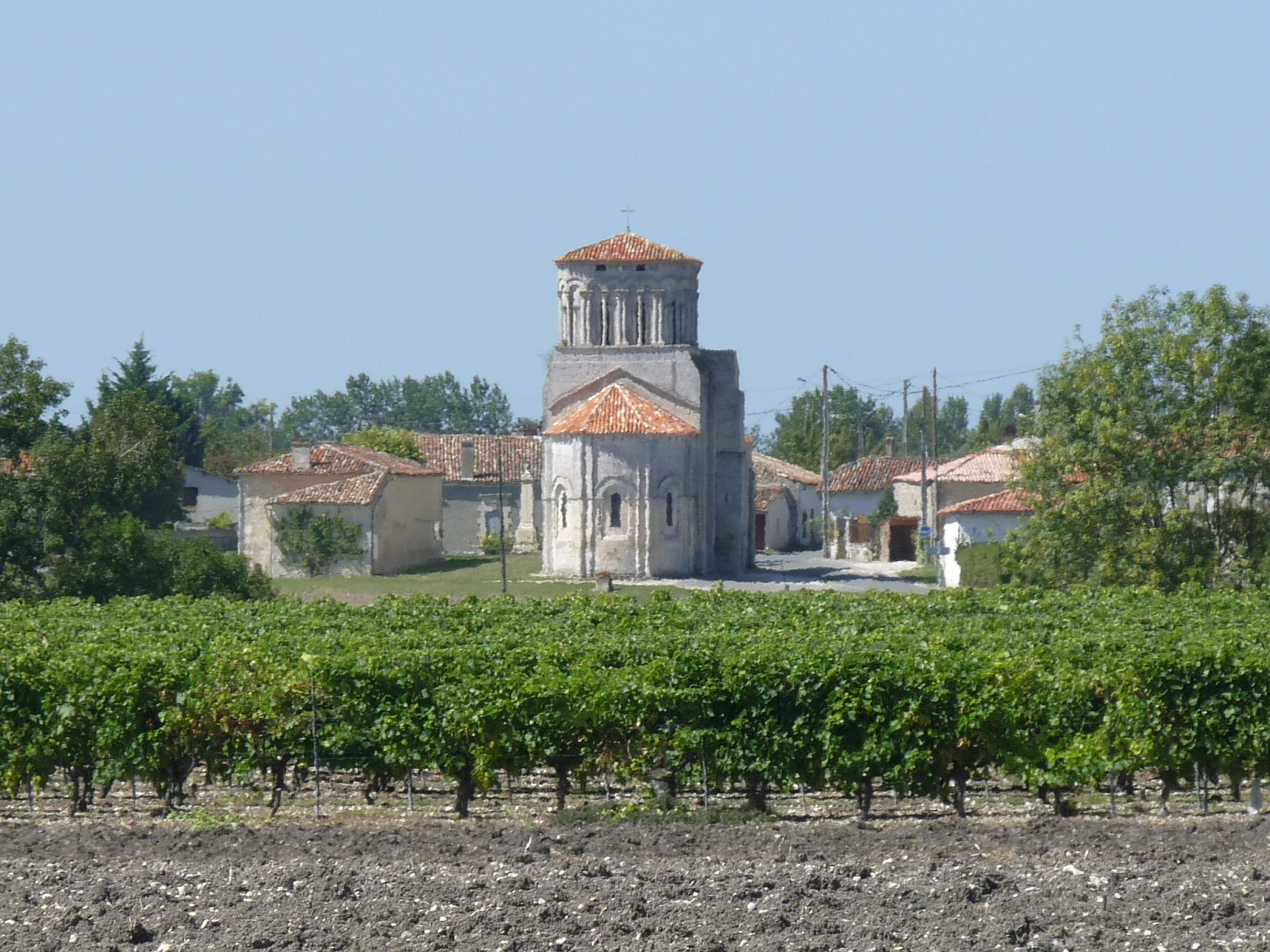
- Location of Moings
- Location within France Location within Nouvelle-Aquitaine
- Coordinates: 45°28′46″N 0°21′35″W
- Country: France
- Region: Nouvelle-Aquitaine
- Department: Charente-Maritime
- Arrondissement: Jonzac
- Canton: Jonzac
- Commune: Réaux-sur-Trèfle
- Area^{1}: 7.57 km^{2} (2.92 sq mi)
- Highest elevation: 68 m (223 ft)
- Lowest elevation: 32 m (105 ft)
- Population (2013): 180
  - Density: 24/km^{2} (62/sq mi)
- Time zone: UTC+01:00 (CET)
  - Summer (DST): UTC+02:00 (CEST)
- Postal code: 17500
- ^{1} French Land Register data, which excludes lakes, ponds, glaciers > 1 km^{2} (0.386 sq mi or 247 acres) and river estuaries.

Moings (French pronunciation: [mwɛ̃]) is a former commune in the Charente-Maritime department in southwestern France. On 1 January 2016, it was merged into the new commune Réaux-sur-Trèfle.

== See also ==
- Communes of the Charente-Maritime department
