= La Souterraine =

Commune in Nouvelle-Aquitaine, France

La Souterraine Lo Sotarrana (Occitan)
- Commune
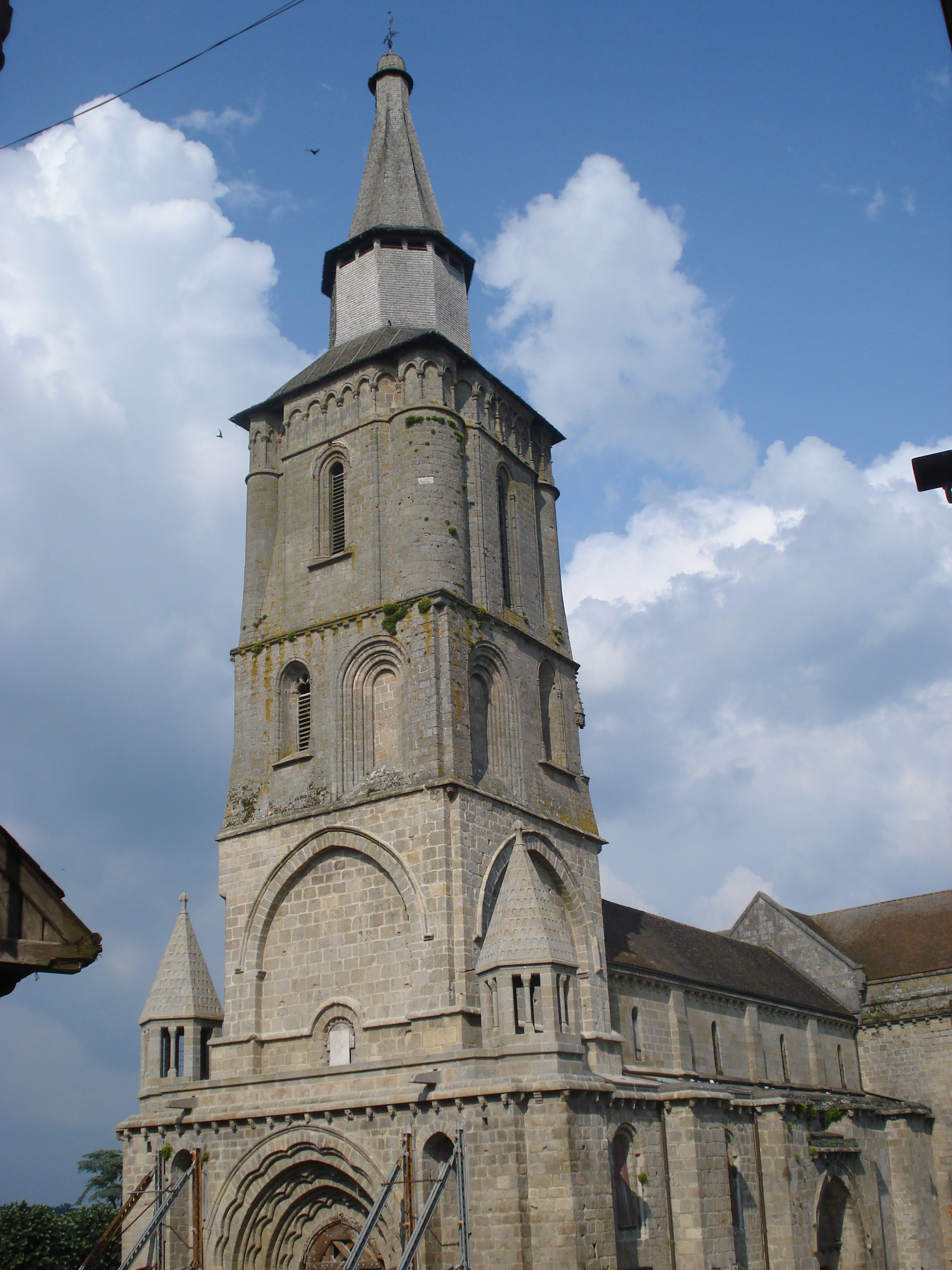
- The bell tower of the church in La Souterraine

- Coat of arms
- Location of La Souterraine
- Location within France Location within Nouvelle-Aquitaine
- Coordinates: 46°14′15″N 1°29′10″E
- Country: France
- Region: Nouvelle-Aquitaine
- Department: Creuse
- Arrondissement: Guéret
- Canton: La Souterraine
- Intercommunality: CC Pays Sostranien

Government
  - Mayor (2020–2026): Étienne Lejeune
- Area^{1}: 37.07 km^{2} (14.31 sq mi)
- Highest elevation: 456 m (1,496 ft)
- Lowest elevation: 284 m (932 ft)
- Population (2023): 4,978
  - Density: 134.3/km^{2} (347.8/sq mi)
- Time zone: UTC+01:00 (CET)
  - Summer (DST): UTC+02:00 (CEST)
- INSEE/Postal code: 23176 /23300
- ^{1} French Land Register data, which excludes lakes, ponds, glaciers > 1 km^{2} (0.386 sq mi or 247 acres) and river estuaries.

La Souterraine (French pronunciation: [la sutɛʁɛn]; Limousin: La Sotarrana) is a commune in the west-central French department of Creuse.

The commune is listed as a Village étape.

== Geography ==
La Souterraine is an area of farming and light industry, comprising the town and a few small hamlets. It is situated some 20 miles (32 km) west of Guéret, at the junction of the D1, D912, D951 and the N145 roads. It is also served by a TER railway link. The small river Sédelle, a tributary of the Creuse, flows through the town. The sources of the Benaize, a tributary of the Anglin, and the Brame, a tributary of the Gartempe, are both in the commune.

=== Climate ===
Climate data for La Souterraine (1991–2020 normals, extremes 1974–present)
| Month | Jan | Feb | Mar | Apr | May | Jun | Jul | Aug | Sep | Oct | Nov | Dec | Year |
|---|---|---|---|---|---|---|---|---|---|---|---|---|---|
| Record high °C (°F) | 19.5 (67.1) | 22.9 (73.2) | 26.0 (78.8) | 29.0 (84.2) | 31.0 (87.8) | 36.8 (98.2) | 38.1 (100.6) | 39.2 (102.6) | 36.2 (97.2) | 31.9 (89.4) | 25.0 (77.0) | 19.5 (67.1) | 39.2 (102.6) |
| Mean daily maximum °C (°F) | 7.2 (45.0) | 8.3 (46.9) | 12.1 (53.8) | 14.9 (58.8) | 18.7 (65.7) | 22.5 (72.5) | 24.8 (76.6) | 25.0 (77.0) | 21.0 (69.8) | 16.4 (61.5) | 10.9 (51.6) | 7.8 (46.0) | 15.8 (60.4) |
| Daily mean °C (°F) | 4.4 (39.9) | 4.7 (40.5) | 7.7 (45.9) | 10.2 (50.4) | 13.8 (56.8) | 17.3 (63.1) | 19.3 (66.7) | 19.4 (66.9) | 15.9 (60.6) | 12.5 (54.5) | 7.7 (45.9) | 5.0 (41.0) | 11.5 (52.7) |
| Mean daily minimum °C (°F) | 1.5 (34.7) | 1.2 (34.2) | 3.4 (38.1) | 5.5 (41.9) | 8.8 (47.8) | 12.1 (53.8) | 13.8 (56.8) | 13.8 (56.8) | 10.8 (51.4) | 8.6 (47.5) | 4.5 (40.1) | 2.2 (36.0) | 7.2 (45.0) |
| Record low °C (°F) | −22.5 (−8.5) | −15.8 (3.6) | −11.5 (11.3) | −6.0 (21.2) | −2.0 (28.4) | 1.0 (33.8) | 3.0 (37.4) | 2.0 (35.6) | 0.0 (32.0) | −5.0 (23.0) | −12.0 (10.4) | −12.0 (10.4) | −22.5 (−8.5) |
| Average precipitation mm (inches) | 94.8 (3.73) | 79.9 (3.15) | 79.8 (3.14) | 86.1 (3.39) | 90.7 (3.57) | 74.9 (2.95) | 65.2 (2.57) | 75.4 (2.97) | 81.6 (3.21) | 99.2 (3.91) | 101.3 (3.99) | 102.5 (4.04) | 1,031.4 (40.61) |
| Average precipitation days (≥ 1.0 mm) | 13.6 | 12.4 | 11.3 | 11.3 | 12.0 | 9.8 | 8.6 | 8.5 | 9.7 | 12.5 | 13.7 | 14.4 | 137.8 |
Source: Meteociel

== History ==
There is evidence of pre-Roman occupation here, attested by the discovery of Stone Age tools and a menhir. Remains of Roman villas and temples have been unearthed. In medieval times, a church and fortified walls were built. The name of the town, translating as ‘subterranean’, comes from the underground parts of the church, the crypt.

== Population ==
Historical population
| Year | Pop. | ±% p.a. |
|---|---|---|
| 1968 | 5,104 | — |
| 1975 | 5,302 | +0.55% |
| 1982 | 5,690 | +1.01% |
| 1990 | 5,459 | −0.52% |
| 1999 | 5,320 | −0.29% |
| 2007 | 5,375 | +0.13% |
| 2012 | 5,437 | +0.23% |
| 2017 | 5,207 | −0.86% |
| 2023 | 4,978 | −0.75% |
Source: INSEE

== Sights ==
- The church dating from the 11th century, with its Roman crypt.
- The 15th-century Manorhouse de Châteaurenaud.
- The 13th-century gate, the Porte de St.Jean, and the rest of the ramparts.
- A feudal motte, circular tower and the castle at Bridiers.
- The 18th-century chapel of the hospital.
- The ancient chapel of Sainte-Eutrope.
- The 14th-century church at Bussière-Madeleine.

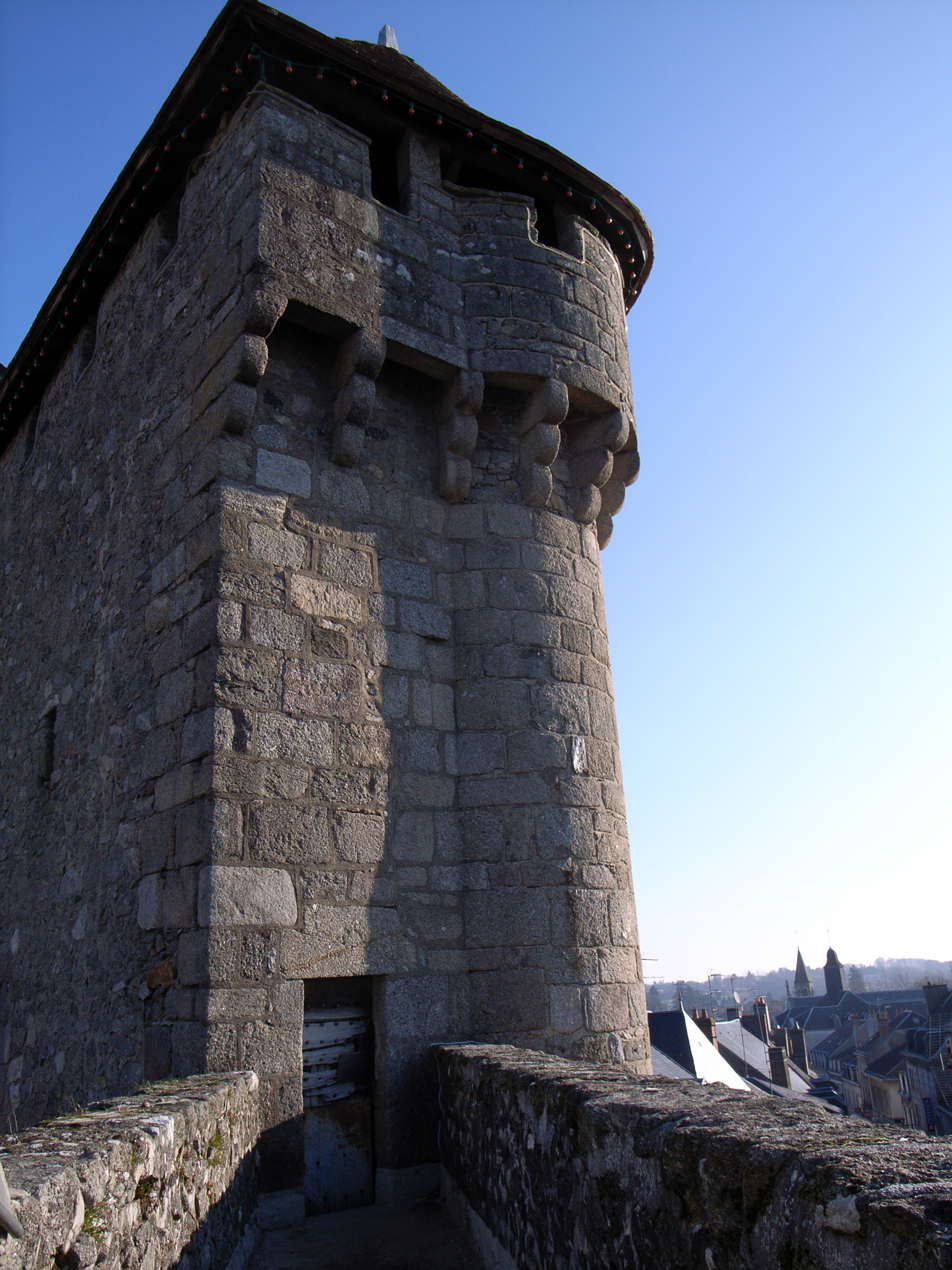
The tower of St.Jean's gate

== See also ==
- Communes of the Creuse department
