= Saint-Léger-Bridereix =

Commune in Nouvelle-Aquitaine, France

- Commune
- Location of Saint-Léger-Bridereix
- Location within France Location within Nouvelle-Aquitaine
- Coordinates: 46°17′14″N 1°35′19″E
- Country: France
- Region: Nouvelle-Aquitaine
- Department: Creuse
- Arrondissement: Guéret
- Canton: La Souterraine
- Intercommunality: CC Pays Sostranien

Government
  - Mayor (2020–2026): Frédéric Malfaisan
- Area^{1}: 8.1 km^{2} (3.1 sq mi)
- Elevation: 300 m (980 ft)
- Highest elevation: 405 m (1,329 ft)
- Lowest elevation: 283 m (928 ft)
- Population (2023): 162
  - Density: 20/km^{2} (52/sq mi)
- Time zone: UTC+01:00 (CET)
  - Summer (DST): UTC+02:00 (CEST)
- INSEE/Postal code: 23207 /23300
- ^{1} French Land Register data, which excludes lakes, ponds, glaciers > 1 km^{2} (0.386 sq mi or 247 acres) and river estuaries.

Saint-Léger-Bridereix (French pronunciation: [sɛ̃ leʒe bʁidʁɛ]; Limousin: Sent Legèr) is a commune in the Creuse department in central France.

== Population ==
Historical population
Year	Pop.	±% p.a.
1968	262	—
1975	236	−1.48%
1982	210	−1.65%
1990	184	−1.64%
1999	174	−0.62%
2007	190	+1.11%
2012	204	+1.43%
2017	198	−0.60%
2023	162	−3.29%
Source: INSEE

== See also ==
- Communes of the Creuse department
