= Church of Saint Maurice =

Church of Saint Maurice may refer to several churches:

- Église Saint-Maurice, Annecy, France
- Church of Saint Maurice (Augsburg), in Augsburg, Germany
- Church of Saint Maurice (Berlin), in Berlin, Germany
- Church of Saint Maurice (Ebersmunster) in France
- Church of Saint Maurice (Hildesheim), in Hildesheim, Germany
- Church of Saint Maurice (Cologne), in Cologne, Germany
- St Maurice's Church, Horkstow, England
- Church of Saint Maurice (Kroměříž), in Kroměříž, Czech Republic
- Church of Saint Maurice (Münster), in Münster, Germany
- Church of Saint Maurice (Olomouc), in the Czech Republic
- Église Saint-Maurice, Soultz-Haut-Rhin, in France
- Église Saint-Maurice, Soultz-les-Bains, in France
- St Maurice's Church, Winchester, England
- Church of Saint Maurice (Wrocław), in Wrocław, Poland
- Morizkirche (Coburg), in Coburg, Germany
