= Vareilles, Creuse =

Commune in Nouvelle-Aquitaine, France

Vareilles
- Commune
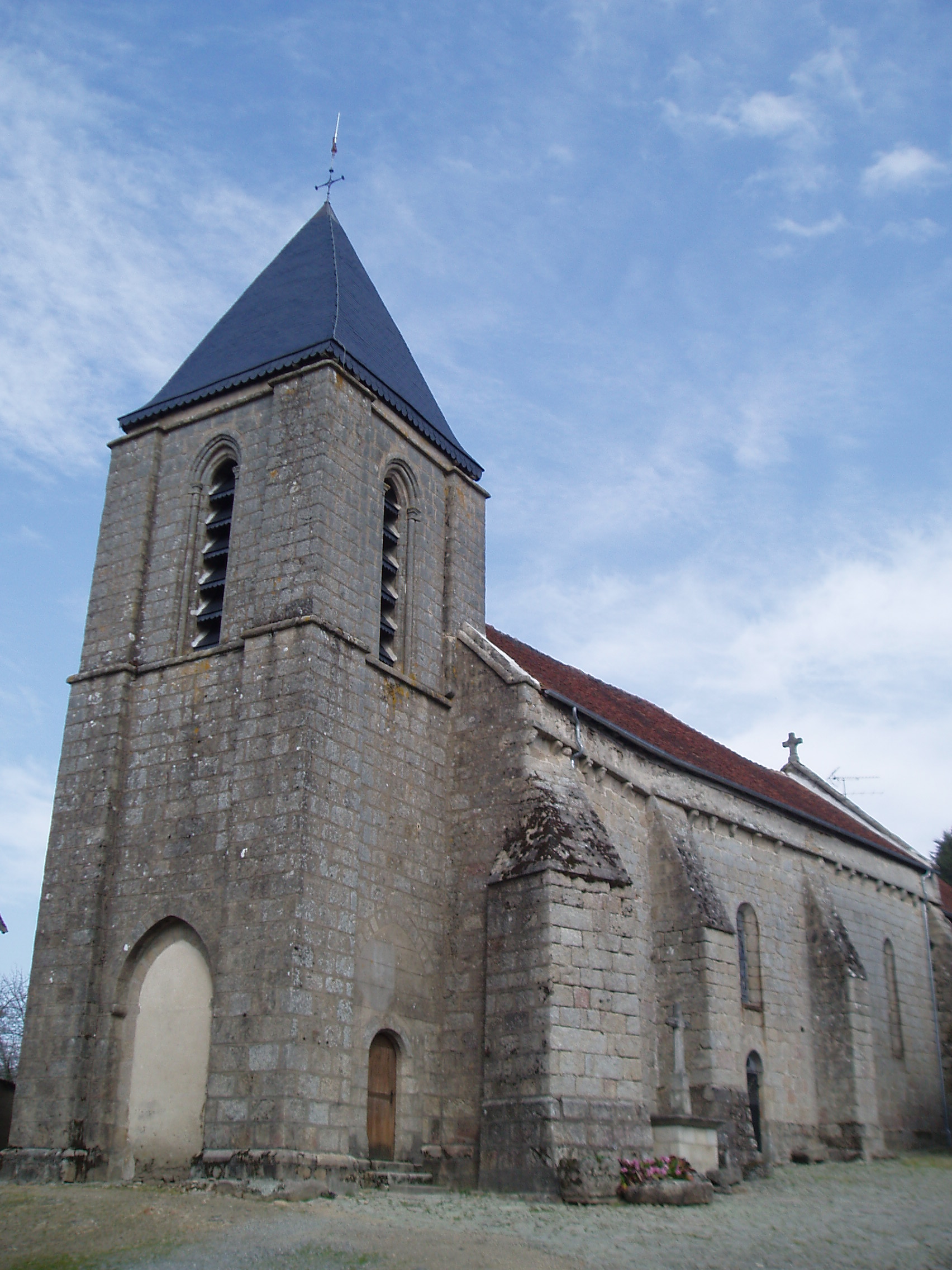
- The church in Vareilles
- Location of Vareilles
- Location within France Location within Nouvelle-Aquitaine
- Coordinates: 46°18′04″N 1°28′41″E
- Country: France
- Region: Nouvelle-Aquitaine
- Department: Creuse
- Arrondissement: Guéret
- Canton: La Souterraine
- Intercommunality: CC Pays Sostranien

Government
  - Mayor (2020–2026): Jean Roland Matigot
- Area^{1}: 17.68 km^{2} (6.83 sq mi)
- Elevation: 361 m (1,184 ft)
- Highest elevation: 403 m (1,322 ft)
- Lowest elevation: 267 m (876 ft)
- Population (2023): 331
  - Density: 18.7/km^{2} (48.5/sq mi)
- Time zone: UTC+01:00 (CET)
  - Summer (DST): UTC+02:00 (CEST)
- INSEE/Postal code: 23258 /23300
- ^{1} French Land Register data, which excludes lakes, ponds, glaciers > 1 km^{2} (0.386 sq mi or 247 acres) and river estuaries.

Vareilles (French pronunciation: [vaʁɛj]; Occitan: Varelhes) is a commune in the Creuse department in the Nouvelle-Aquitaine region in central France.

== Geography ==
A farming area comprising the village and several hamlets situated some 23 miles (37 km) northwest of Guéret at the junction of the D10, D1 and the D71 roads.

The Benaize river flows through the commune and forms part of its western border.

== Population ==
Historical population
| Year | Pop. | ±% p.a. |
|---|---|---|
| 1968 | 385 | — |
| 1975 | 311 | −3.00% |
| 1982 | 308 | −0.14% |
| 1990 | 297 | −0.45% |
| 1999 | 266 | −1.22% |
| 2007 | 291 | +1.13% |
| 2012 | 311 | +1.34% |
| 2017 | 311 | +0.00% |
| 2023 | 331 | +1.04% |
Source: INSEE

== Sights ==
- The church of St. Pardoux, dating from the twelfth century.
- The remains of a fifteenth-century manorhouse at Montlebeau.

== See also ==
- Communes of the Creuse department
