= Canton of La Souterraine =

Coordinates: 46°15′07″N 1°35′57″E

La Souterraine
- Canton
- Interactive map of La Souterraine
- Country: France
- Region: Nouvelle-Aquitaine
- Department: Creuse
- No. of communes: {{{nbcomm}}}
- Area: 203.36 km^{2} (78.52 sq mi)
- Population (2023): 8,842
  - Density: 43.48/km^{2} (112.6/sq mi)
- INSEE code: 23 15

The Canton of La Souterraine is a canton situated in the Creuse département and in the Nouvelle-Aquitaine region of central France.

== Geography ==
An area of farming and forestry in the arrondissement of Guéret, centred on the town of La Souterraine. The altitude varies from 267m (Vareilles) to 456m (La Souterraine) with an average altitude of 354m.

== Population ==
Historical population
| Year | Pop. | ±% p.a. |
|---|---|---|
| 2013 | 9,599 | — |
| 2018 | 9,177 | −0.90% |
Source: INSEE

== Composition ==
At the French canton reorganisation which came into effect in March 2015, the canton was reduced from 10 to 7 communes:

- Noth
- Saint-Agnant-de-Versillat
- Saint-Léger-Bridereix
- Saint-Maurice-la-Souterraine
- Saint-Priest-la-Feuille
- La Souterraine
- Vareilles

== See also ==
- Arrondissements of the Creuse department
- Cantons of the Creuse department
- Communes of the Creuse department
