= Communauté de communes du Pays Sostranien =

Coordinates: 46.2398°N 1.486°E

Pays Sostranien
- Communauté de communes
- Interactive map of Pays Sostranien
- Country: France
- Region: Nouvelle-Aquitaine
- Department: Creuse
- No. of communes: {{{nbcomm}}}
- Established: 1996
- Area: 273.3 km^{2} (105.5 sq mi)
- Population (2018): 10,654
  - Density: 38.98/km^{2} (101.0/sq mi)

The communauté de communes du Pays Sostranien is located in the Creuse département of the Nouvelle-Aquitaine region, in central France. It was created on 1 January 1996. It was merged into the new Communauté de communes Monts et Vallées Ouest Creuse in January 2017, but this merger was revoked and the former communautés de communes were recreated on 31 December 2019. Its seat is La Souterraine. Its area is 273.3 km^{2}, and its population was 10,654 in 2018.

It comprises the following 10 communes:

- Azerables
- Bazelat
- Noth
- Saint-Agnant-de-Versillat
- Saint-Germain-Beaupré
- Saint-Léger-Bridereix
- Saint-Maurice-la-Souterraine
- Saint-Priest-la-Feuille
- La Souterraine
- Vareilles

== See also ==
- Communes of the Creuse department
