= Noth, Creuse =

Commune in Nouvelle-Aquitaine, France

Noth
- Commune
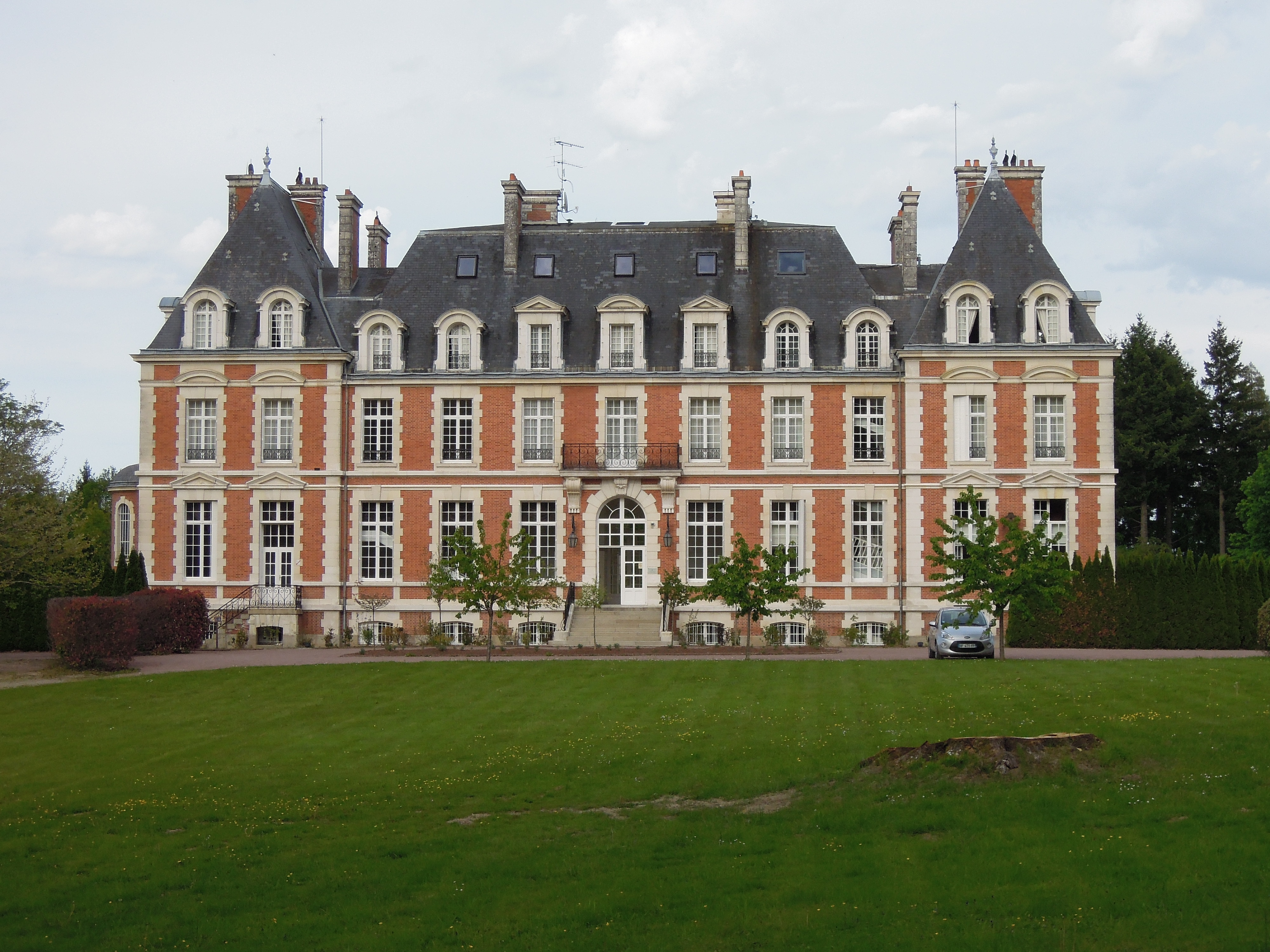
- Chateau of La Cazine
- Location of Noth
- Location within France Location within Nouvelle-Aquitaine
- Coordinates: 46°14′08″N 1°35′12″E
- Country: France
- Region: Nouvelle-Aquitaine
- Department: Creuse
- Arrondissement: Guéret
- Canton: La Souterraine
- Intercommunality: CC Pays Sostranien

Government
  - Mayor (2020–2026): Jean-Luc Gazonnaud
- Area^{1}: 22.89 km^{2} (8.84 sq mi)
- Elevation: 367 m (1,204 ft)
- Highest elevation: 453 m (1,486 ft)
- Lowest elevation: 339 m (1,112 ft)
- Population (2023): 498
  - Density: 21.8/km^{2} (56.3/sq mi)
- Time zone: UTC+01:00 (CET)
  - Summer (DST): UTC+02:00 (CEST)
- INSEE/Postal code: 23143 /23300
- ^{1} French Land Register data, which excludes lakes, ponds, glaciers > 1 km^{2} (0.386 sq mi or 247 acres) and river estuaries.

Noth (French pronunciation: [nɔt]; Occitan: Nòt) is a commune in the Creuse department in the Nouvelle-Aquitaine region in central France.

== Geography ==
An area of streams, lakes and woods, forestry and farming, comprising the village and several hamlets situated some 14 miles (23 km) west of Guéret at the junction of the D49 and D74 and near the N145 road.

== Population ==
Historical population
Year	Pop.	±% p.a.
1968	544	—
1975	515	−0.78%
1982	451	−1.88%
1990	477	+0.70%
1999	459	−0.43%
2007	517	+1.50%
2012	522	+0.19%
2017	499	−0.90%
2023	498	−0.03%
Source: INSEE

== Sights ==
- The thirteenth-century church, with a fortified tower.
- An ancient stone cross.
- The Lac de la Cazine, a 50 hectares (120 acres) lake.
- The château de la Cazine at La Fôt.

== See also ==
- Communes of the Creuse department
