= Saint-Agnant-de-Versillat =

Commune in Nouvelle-Aquitaine, France

- Commune
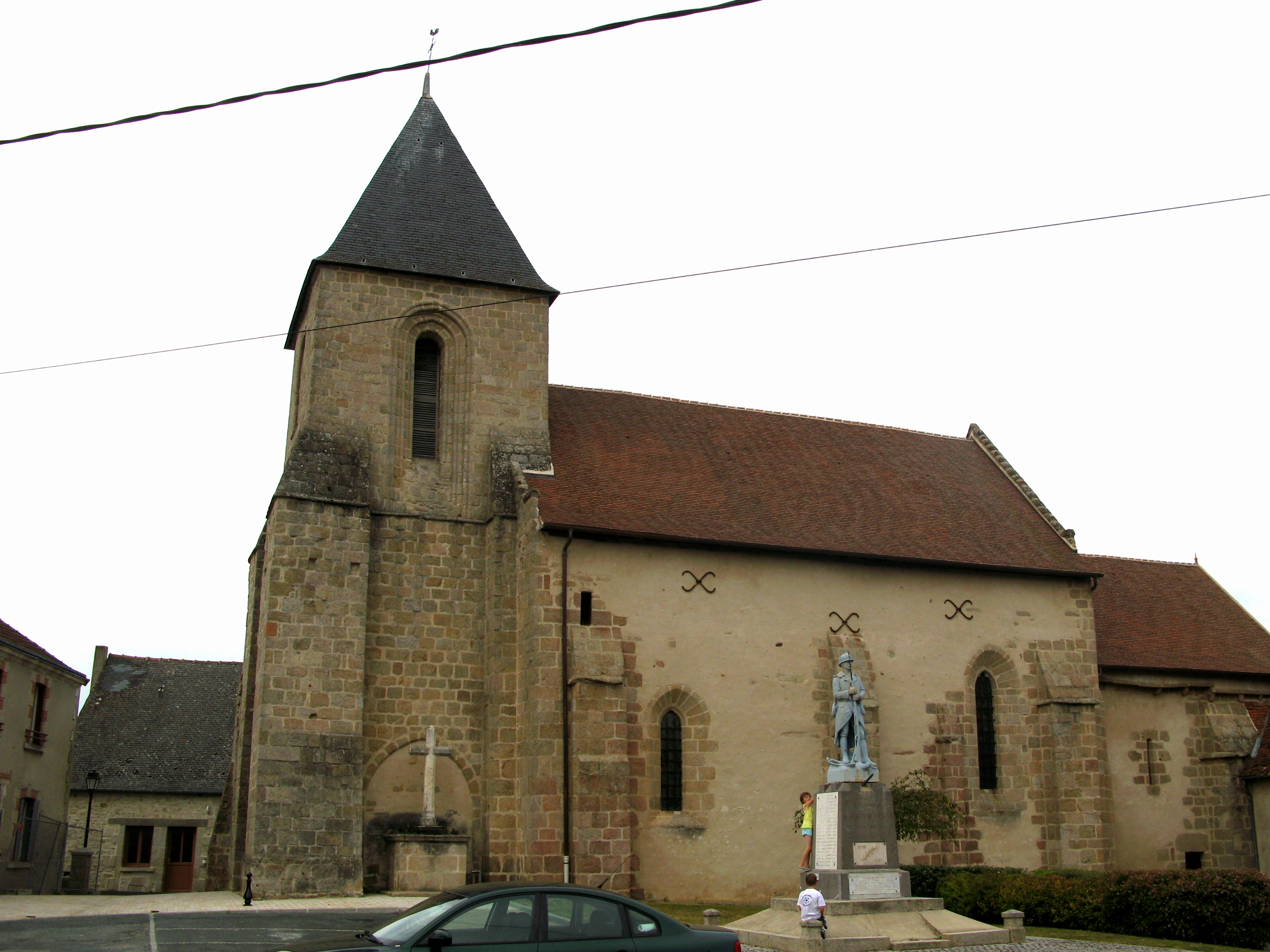
- The church and the war memorial in Saint-Agnant-de-Versillat
- Location of Saint-Agnant-de-Versillat
- Location within France Location within Nouvelle-Aquitaine
- Coordinates: 46°16′47″N 1°30′43″E
- Country: France
- Region: Nouvelle-Aquitaine
- Department: Creuse
- Arrondissement: Guéret
- Canton: La Souterraine
- Intercommunality: CC Pays Sostranien

Government
  - Mayor (2020–2026): Pierre Decoursier
- Area^{1}: 50.46 km^{2} (19.48 sq mi)
- Elevation: 302 m (991 ft)
- Highest elevation: 449 m (1,473 ft)
- Lowest elevation: 279 m (915 ft)
- Population (2023): 1,039
  - Density: 20.59/km^{2} (53.33/sq mi)
- Time zone: UTC+01:00 (CET)
  - Summer (DST): UTC+02:00 (CEST)
- INSEE/Postal code: 23177 /23300
- ^{1} French Land Register data, which excludes lakes, ponds, glaciers > 1 km^{2} (0.386 sq mi or 247 acres) and river estuaries.

Saint-Agnant-de-Versillat (French pronunciation: [sɛ̃.t‿aɲɑ̃ də vɛʁsija]; Occitan: Sent Anhan) is a commune in the Creuse department in central France.

== Population ==
Historical population
Year	Pop.	±% p.a.
1968	1,253	—
1975	1,168	−1.00%
1982	1,067	−1.28%
1990	1,115	+0.55%
1999	1,100	−0.15%
2007	1,124	+0.27%
2012	1,120	−0.07%
2017	1,094	−0.47%
2023	1,039	−0.86%
Source: INSEE

== See also ==
- Communes of the Creuse department
