= Réaux-sur-Trèfle =

- Commune
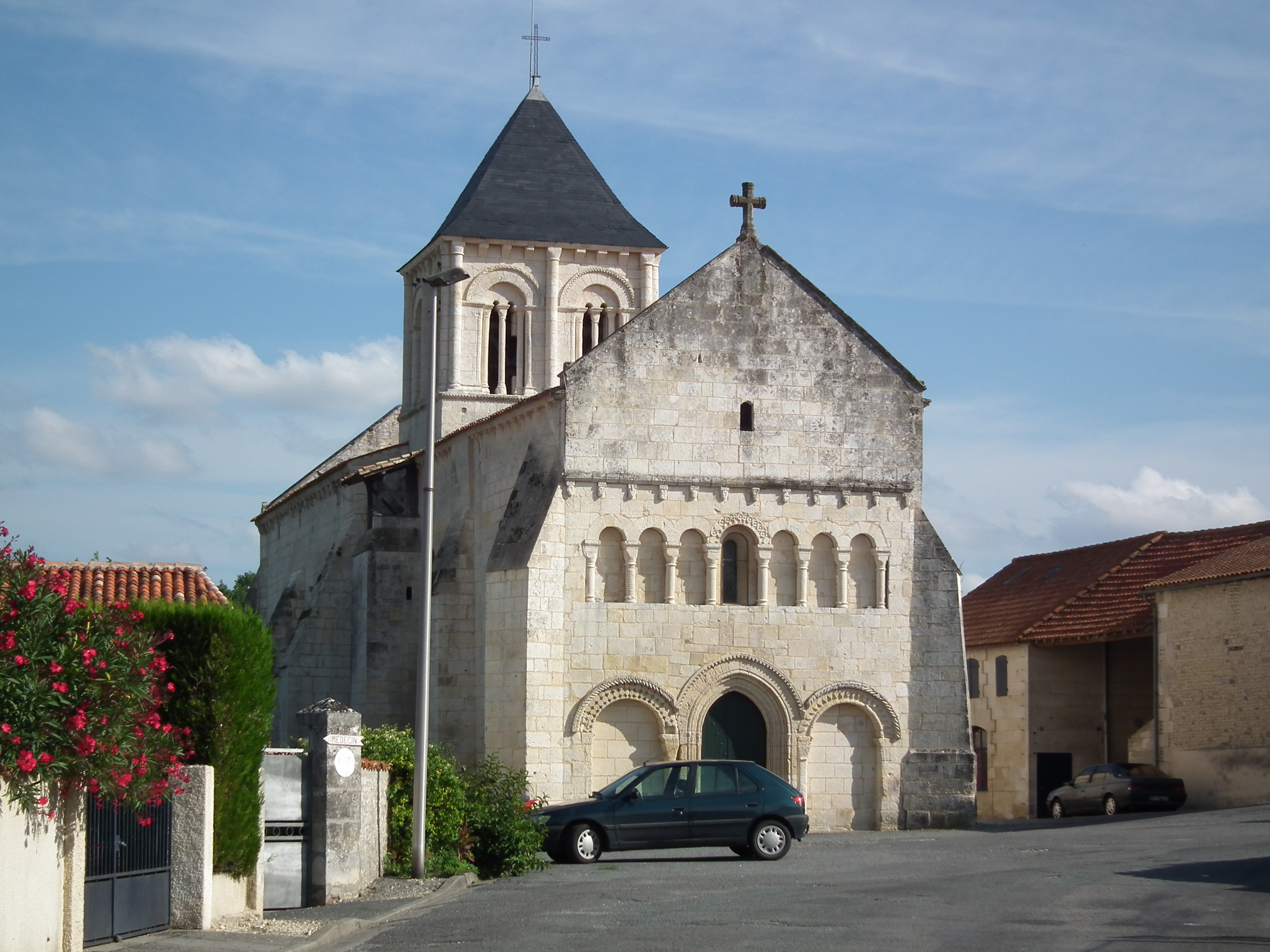
- The church in Réaux
- Location of Réaux-sur-Trèfle
- Location within France Location within Nouvelle-Aquitaine
- Coordinates: 45°28′37″N 0°22′30″W
- Country: France
- Region: Nouvelle-Aquitaine
- Department: Charente-Maritime
- Arrondissement: Jonzac
- Canton: Jonzac

Government
  - Mayor (2020–2026): Patrick Berthelot
- Area^{1}: 20.45 km^{2} (7.90 sq mi)
- Population (2023): 765
  - Density: 37.4/km^{2} (96.9/sq mi)
- Time zone: UTC+01:00 (CET)
  - Summer (DST): UTC+02:00 (CEST)
- INSEE/Postal code: 17295 /17500
- ^{1} French Land Register data, which excludes lakes, ponds, glaciers > 1 km^{2} (0.386 sq mi or 247 acres) and river estuaries.

Réaux-sur-Trèfle (French pronunciation: [ʁeo syʁ tʁɛfl], lit. 'Réaux on Trèfle') is a commune in the Charente-Maritime department of southwestern France. The municipality was established on 1 January 2016 and consists of the former communes of Réaux, Moings and Saint-Maurice-de-Tavernole.

== See also ==
- Communes of the Charente-Maritime department
