= St. Moritz (disambiguation) =

St. Moritz is a resort town in Switzerland.

St. Moritz, Saint Moritz, or Sankt-Moritz may also refer to:

- Saint Maurice (German: St. Moritz), a Roman military leader and Christian saint.

== Places ==
- Lake St. Moritz, St. Moritz, Switzerland
- Galula, Tanzania, formerly known as St. Moritz, an administrative ward

== Other uses ==
- St. Moritz, Halle, Saxony-Anhalt, Germany, a church
- St. Moritz, Jakarta, Indonesia, a housing development
- Hotel St. Moritz, a former hotel in New York City
- St. Moritz 1928, the 1928 Winter Olympics in St. Moritz, Switzerland
- St. Moritz 1948, the 1948 Winter Olympics in St. Moritz, Switzerland
- St. Moritz (Rhaetian Railway station), St. Moritz, Switzerland
- Rambler St. Moritz, a 1966 Rambler Classic show car by American Motors
- St Moritz, a nightclub in Wardour Street, London

== See also ==
- Saint-Maurice (disambiguation)
- St Morris, South Australia, Australia, a suburb of Adelaide
- Moritz (disambiguation)
