= Morice =

Morice may refer to:

Persons

- Adrien-Gabriel Morice (1859–1938), French priest and missionary to Canada; created a writing system for the Carrier language
- Charles Morice (footballer) (1850–1932), English international footballer
- Dave Morice (born 1946), American writer, visual artist, and performance artist
- Francis David Morice (1849–1926), English entomologist and author
- Francis Morice (1851–1912), New Zealand cricketer
- Marie-Cécile Morice (1947–2024), French politician
- Morice Baronets, any one of several baronets of the baronetcy of Devon, England
- Morice Bird (1888–1933), English professional cricketer
- Morice Norris (born 2000), American football player
- Peter Morice (died 1588), Dutch or German engineer who built a pumped water supply system for the city of London
- Pierre Morice (born 1962), French professional football player
- Tara Morice (born 1964), Australian actress, singer, and dancer
- William Morice (disambiguation), any one of several 16th- and 17th-century British baronets and MPs
- Nicolas Morice, French Navy officer in the 19th century

Other

- Morice Line, defensive line built in the 1950s to protect Algeria
- Morice Range, mountain range in British Columbia, Canada
- Morice River, British Columbia, Canada
- Morice Town, Devon, England
