= Saint Maurice (Master Theodoric) =

Painting by Master Theodoric

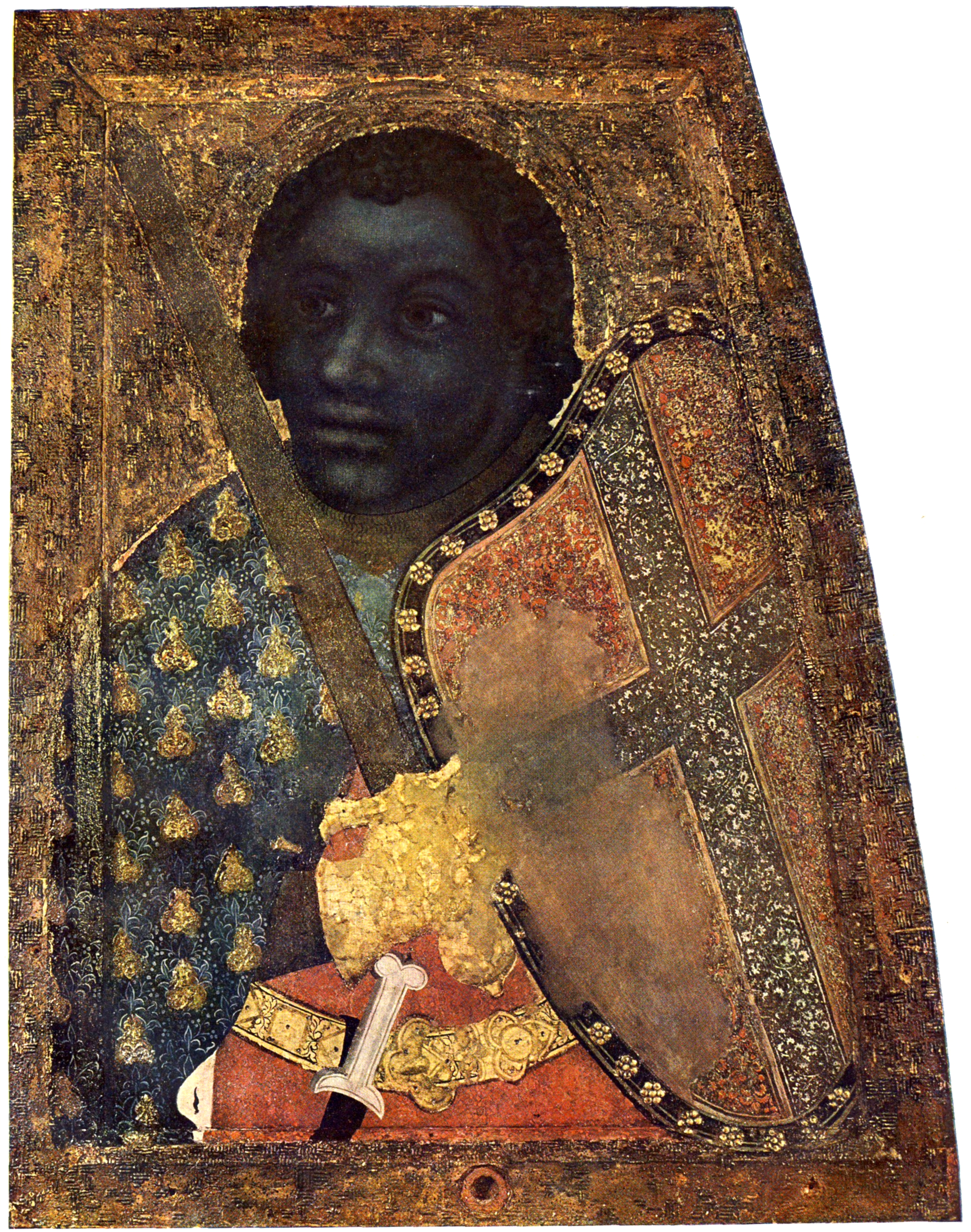
- Saint Maurice (Master Theodoric)
- Artist: Master Theodoric
- Year: c. 1360 - 1365
- Medium: oil tempera on beech board
- Dimensions: 114,7 cm × 67.8 / 90.2 cm (452 in × 26.7 / 35.5 in)
- Location: Chapel of the Holy Cross, Karlštejn

Saint Maurice (Latin: Mauritius) is an oil tempera on beech board painting by Bohemian painter Master Theodoric, created around 1360-1365. It is probably the first depiction of a black man in Czech painting. The extraordinary importance of this knight in the conception of the Chapel of the Holy Cross is evidenced by the portrait's placement in the main space of the presbytery adjacent to the painting of St. George and the Bohemian patron saint St. Vitus.

== Description and classification ==
The painting has the height of 114.7 cm, the width 67.8 cm at the top, and 90.2 cm at the bottom. The frame is original, with geometric embossed decoration and a circular reliquary opening in the lower frame rail.

The painting is characterised by a dark incarnation, velvety soft modelling with soft highlights and a calm and composed face with well-defined physiognomic features of an African, including full lips and short and thickly curled hair. The quality of the execution places the work in the main group of Theodoric's paintings in the Chapel of the Holy Cross. The blue cloak is decorated with a delicate stencilled pattern, complete with pasted-on embossed appliqués. These are identical in shape to the decorations on the St Catherine's mantle. The lower red part of the robe is decorated with a gold brocade pattern. The gold belt shows the holes through which the embossed accessories were attached. Other motifs were used to decorate the large shield. The silver cross in the centre is covered with white plant tendrils, the golden surface of the shield is combined with red painting. The rim of the shield is decorated with an embossed decoration with rosettes. Similar decorative elements were used on the shield of the Archangel Gabriel on the altar wall of the chapel.

== Saint Maurice as the patron saint of the emperors of the Holy Roman Empire ==
According to a legend created in the late 4th century, Saint Maurice was the commander of the Christian Theban Legion, which was allegedly slaughtered by the Roman Emperor Maximian near present-day Saint Moritz, Switzerland, when Maurice and his soldiers refused to participate in a ritual of sacrifice to pagan gods. Saint Maurice has been the patron saint of the emperors of the Holy Roman Empire since the 10th century. In 926, Henry the Fowler donated the entire Swiss canton of Aargau to the local abbey in exchange for the holy relics of Saint Maurice - spear, sword and spurs. These became part of the coronation ritual of the emperors and survived in Austria-Hungary as the emperor's insignia until 1916. In 937, the first emperor of the Holy Roman Empire, Otto I, founded the monastery of Saint Maurice in Magdeburg. The cult of Saint Maurice spread from Germany to Bohemia, where the Luxembourgs associated their imperial ambitions with him. For Charles IV, the saint had a special significance. The "Holy Lance", one of the main relics he collected and had the Chapel of the Holy Cross built for them, was considered a relic of Saint Maurice in his time.

=== Saint Maurice in art ===
St. Maurice is usually depicted as a black or Roman soldier of European appearance (Titian), usually in armour.

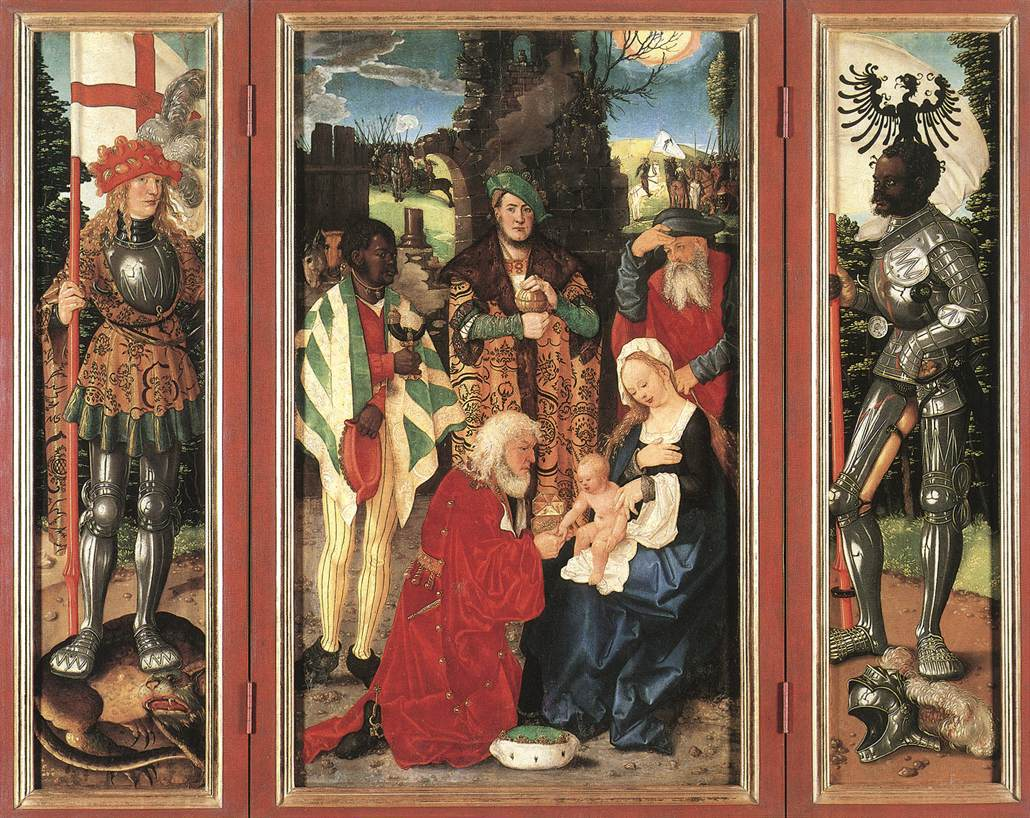
Hans Baldung, Adoration of the Magi, St. George, Saint Maurice (1507)

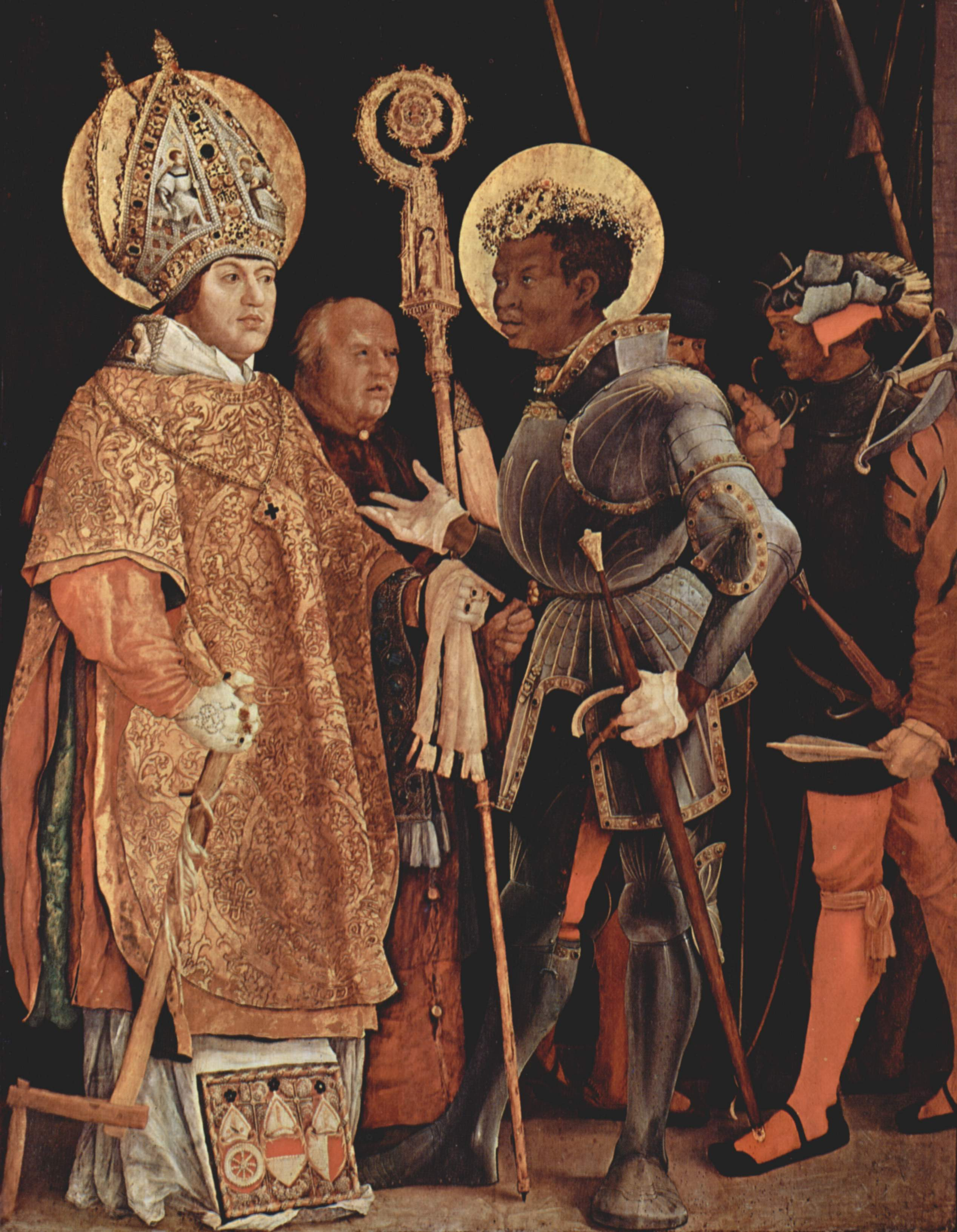
Matthias Grünewald, Meeting of St. Martyr Maurice, leader of the Theban Legion, with St. Erasmus (1517-1523)

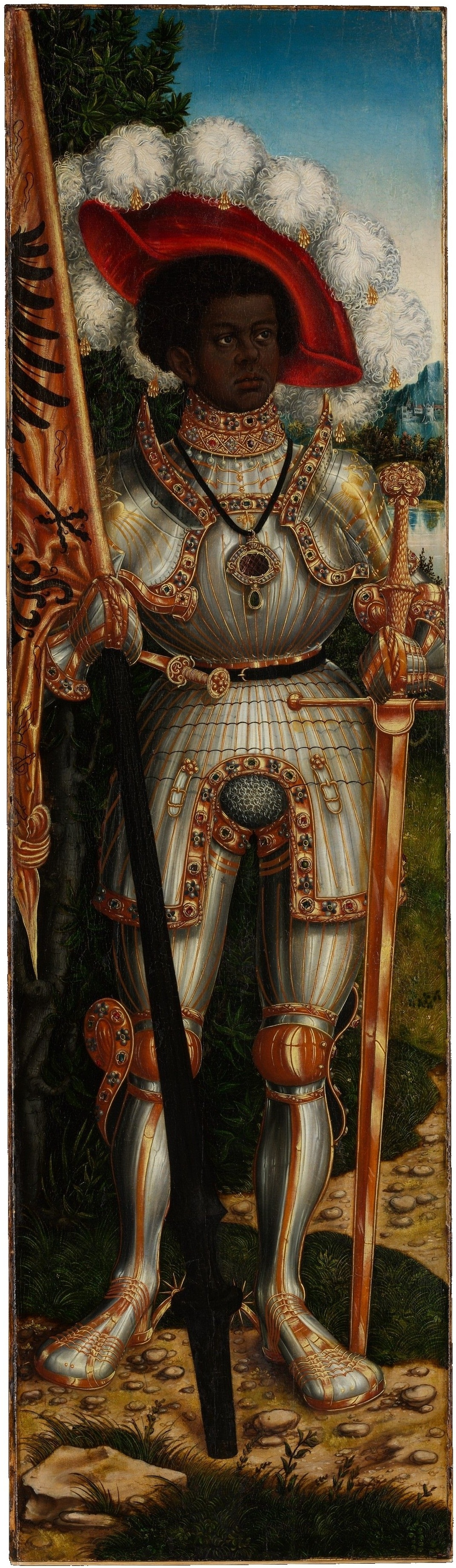
Lucas Cranach the Elder, Der heilige Mauritius (1522-1525)

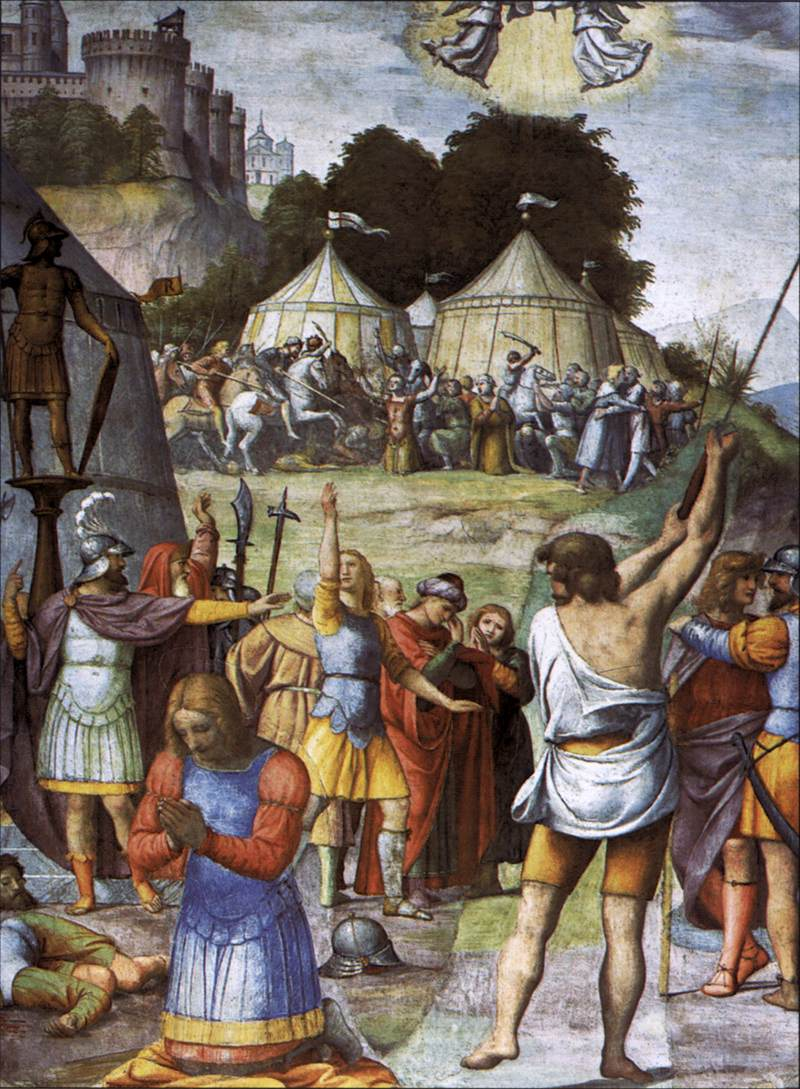
Bernardino Luini, The Martyrdom of St Maurice (fresco, around 1510)

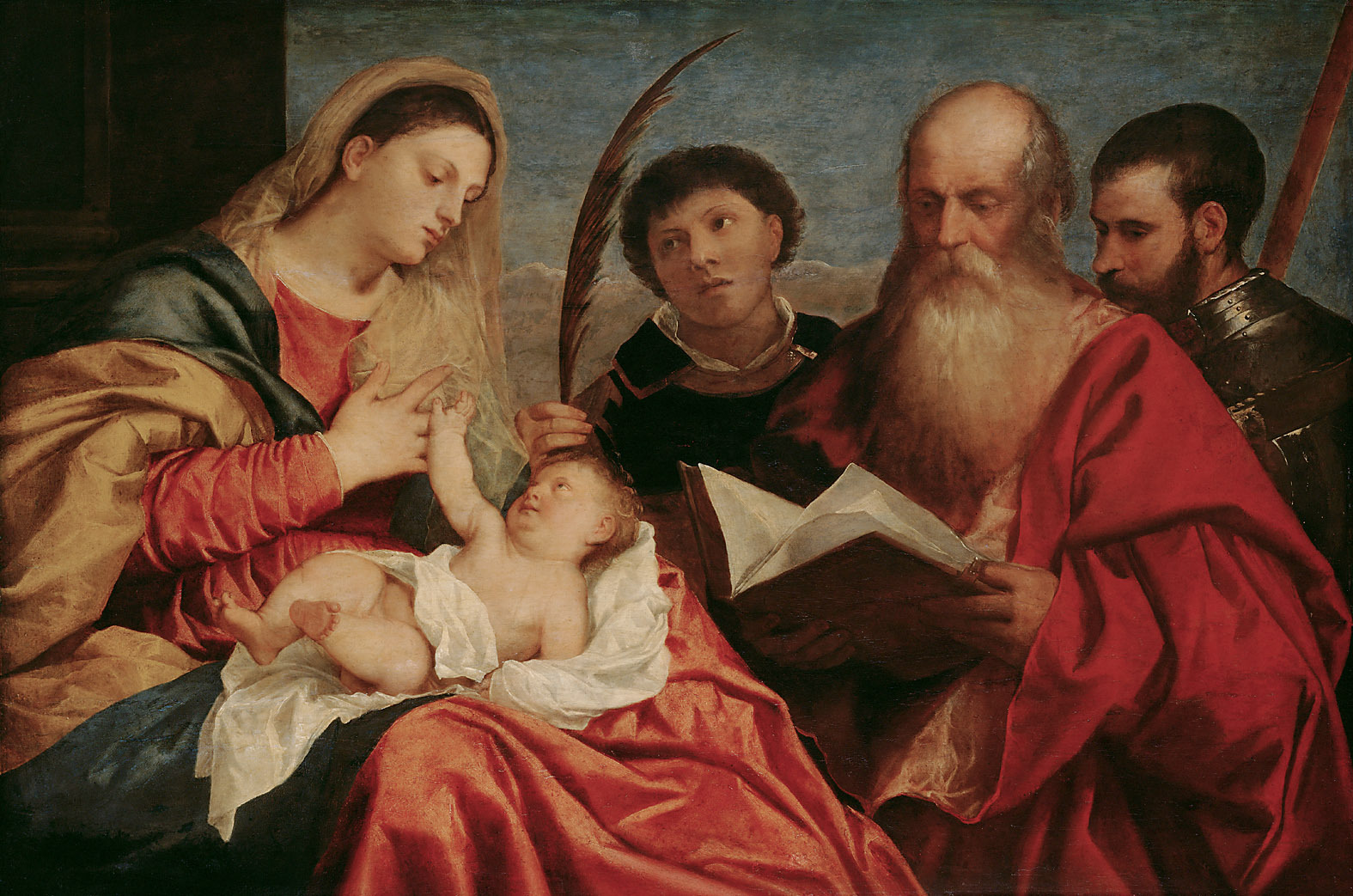
Tizian, Madonna with child and saints - Jerome, Stephen, Saint Maurice (1520)

== Sources ==
- Jiří Fajt (ed.), Magister Theodoricus, court painter to Emperor Charles IV, National Gallery in Prague 1997, p. 532, ISBN 80-7035-142-X
- Suckale-Redlefsen and Robert Suckale, Mauritius der heilige Mohr/ The Black Saint Maurice. English translation of foreword and introduction by Genoveva Nitz. Houston/Zurich) 1988. A catalogue of 205 images of St. Maurice is included.
