= Ian Morrice =

Ian Rognvald Morrice is a Scottish-born CEO of Australia's largest wholesaler, Metcash Limited. He was appointed Group CEO in July 2013. Metcash is the leading buying, marketing and distribution company to independent retailers across Australia, a company that provides grocery goods, liquor and hardware to retailers. However, Ian Morrice had also held a non-executive director position with Metcash since June 2012.

Ian Morrice has a master of business administration degree from Cranfield University in Bedfordshire, England.

Morrice served as the group chief executive officer for The Warehouse Limited (NZ) from 1 August 2004 until May 2011. Prior to 2004, Morrice had served as the managing director of B&Q Warehouse, a division of Kingfisher plc, a large-format warehouse chain company based in the United Kingdom. Starting with B&Q in 2001, Morrice had led the company to its successful expansion into Ireland and the company's launch for providing financial services.

Morrice has extensive experience in retail; for years he was the retail director for Woolworths chain of over 800 stores throughout the United Kingdom. He has served in multiple positions as a senior executive for Dixon's, currently the number one electrical retail group in Europe. From August 2012 to 1 March 2013, Morrice was a non-executive director for Myer, an Australian retailer that operates a chain of department stores that sell men's, women's, and children's apparel among other products for the home. From 9 September 2004 to 2 May 2011, Morrice served as an executive director for The Warehouse Group Limited and for The Warehouse Stationary Limited.
