= Church of Saint Maurice (Olomouc) =

Roman Catholic church in the Czech Republic

- Kostel svatého Mořice
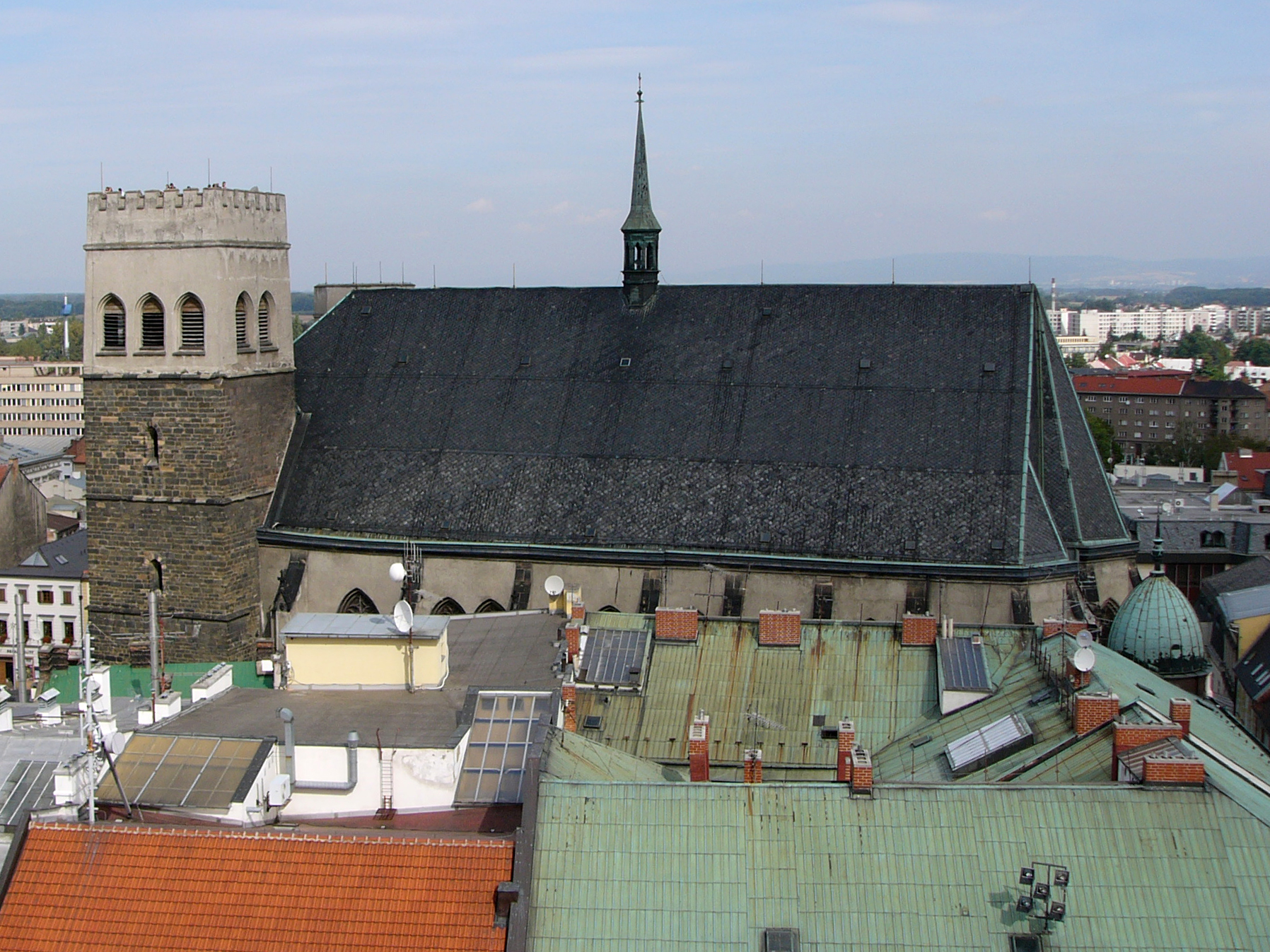
- Church of Saint Maurice viewed from the south

Religion
- Affiliation: Roman Catholic
- Diocese: Archdiocese of Olomouc
- Ecclesiastical or organisational status: Active
- Year consecrated: 22 September 814; 1212 years ago

Location
- Location: Olomouc, Czech Republic
- Interactive map of Church of Saint Maurice
- Coordinates: 49°35′42.34″N 17°15′4.91″E

Architecture
- Type: Church
- Style: Gothic
- Completed: 15th century
- Height (max): 46 m (151 ft)

The Church of Saint Maurice (Czech: Kostel svatého Mořice) is a Roman Catholic church in Olomouc, Czech Republic. It is located in the city centre, near the Horní náměstí ("Upper Square") and is one of the most important landmarks of the city.

It is unknown when exactly the church was constructed. It has two towers: the southern tower, the oldest part of the building, dates back to 1403; the northern one dates back to 1412. The church was probably consecrated in 1492. The Neo-Gothic main altar was built in 1861. The church has an arched triple nave. The main nave contains the church organ, originating from 1740 to 1745; with its five manuals and 95 stops, it is among the largest organs in the world. It was built by organ builder Michael Engler the Younger, and extended in 1959–1971 by Rieger-Kloss.

The church, together with the city's Saint Wenceslas Cathedral, is the main site of the city's International Organ Festival, inaugurated by Antonin Schindler in 1969.

The church was designated a National Cultural Landmark by the government in 1995. The southern tower serves as a lookout tower, with a view of the whole city of Olomouc and surroundings.

== History ==
The first record of a church on this site was in 1078. The predecessor of the current building was erected in 1257 on the initiative of Bruno von Schauenburg, bishop of Olomouc. However the church was destroyed by fire and rebuilt on multiple occasions: in 1398, 1404, 1411 and 1454.

During the Swedish intervention in the Thirty Years' War (1642), Protestant services were held in the church for at least seven years in succession.
