= Réaux, Charente-Maritime =

Réaux
- Part of Réaux-sur-Trèfle
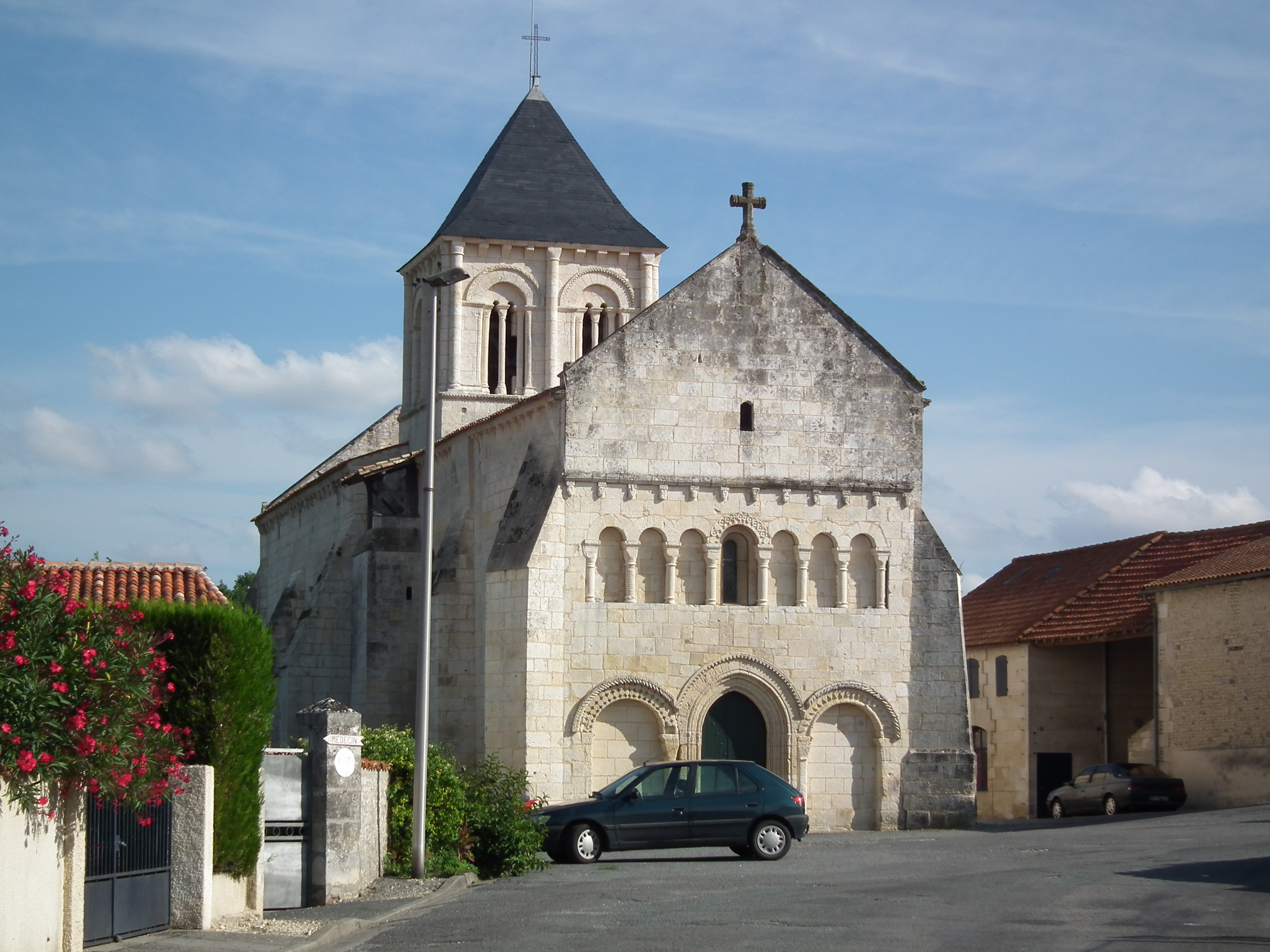
- Location of Réaux
- Location within France Location within Nouvelle-Aquitaine
- Coordinates: 45°28′41″N 0°22′23″W
- Country: France
- Region: Nouvelle-Aquitaine
- Department: Charente-Maritime
- Arrondissement: Jonzac
- Canton: Jonzac
- Commune: Réaux-sur-Trèfle
- Area^{1}: 8.96 km^{2} (3.46 sq mi)
- Highest elevation: 96 m (315 ft)
- Lowest elevation: 33 m (108 ft)
- Population (2013): 476
  - Density: 53.1/km^{2} (138/sq mi)
- Time zone: UTC+01:00 (CET)
  - Summer (DST): UTC+02:00 (CEST)
- Postal code: 17500
- ^{1} French Land Register data, which excludes lakes, ponds, glaciers > 1 km^{2} (0.386 sq mi or 247 acres) and river estuaries.

Réaux (French pronunciation: [ʁeo]) is a former commune in the Charente-Maritime department in southwestern France. On 1 January 2016, it was merged into the new commune Réaux-sur-Trèfle.

== Population ==
Historical population
| Year | Pop. | ±% p.a. |
|---|---|---|
| 1962 | 440 | — |
| 1968 | 481 | +1.50% |
| 1975 | 516 | +1.01% |
| 1982 | 453 | −1.84% |
| 1990 | 436 | −0.48% |
| 1999 | 475 | +0.96% |
| 2006 | 449 | −0.80% |
| 2013 | 476 | +0.84% |
Source: EHESS and INSEE (2013)

== See also ==
- Communes of the Charente-Maritime department
