= Saint-Maurice-la-Souterraine =

Commune in Nouvelle-Aquitaine, France

- Commune
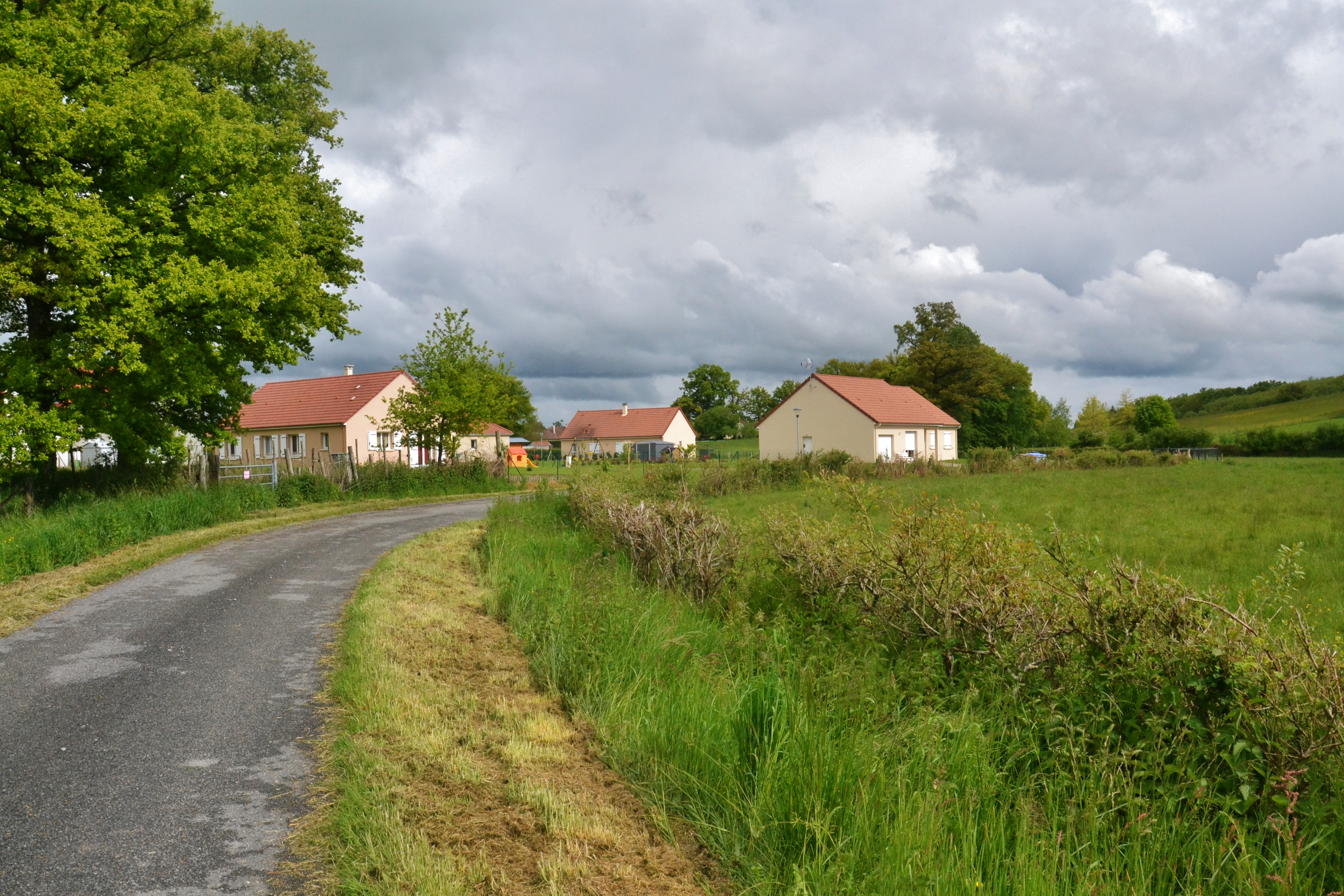
- Buildings in Saint-Maurice-la-Souterraine
- Location of Saint-Maurice-la-Souterraine
- Location within France Location within Nouvelle-Aquitaine
- Coordinates: 46°12′54″N 1°25′55″E
- Country: France
- Region: Nouvelle-Aquitaine
- Department: Creuse
- Arrondissement: Guéret
- Canton: La Souterraine
- Intercommunality: CC Pays Sostranien

Government
  - Mayor (2020–2026): Évelyne Augros
- Area^{1}: 39.72 km^{2} (15.34 sq mi)
- Elevation: 359 m (1,178 ft)
- Highest elevation: 422 m (1,385 ft)
- Lowest elevation: 300 m (980 ft)
- Population (2023): 1,116
  - Density: 28.10/km^{2} (72.77/sq mi)
- Time zone: UTC+01:00 (CET)
  - Summer (DST): UTC+02:00 (CEST)
- INSEE/Postal code: 23219 /23300
- ^{1} French Land Register data, which excludes lakes, ponds, glaciers > 1 km^{2} (0.386 sq mi or 247 acres) and river estuaries.

Saint-Maurice-la-Souterraine (French: [sɛ̃ mɔʁis la sutɛʁɛn]; Occitan: Sent Maurici la Subterrani) is a commune in the Creuse department in central France.

== Geography ==
The river Semme flows west through the commune's southern part.

The river Brame flows west through the commune's northern part.

== Population ==
Historical population
Year	Pop.	±% p.a.
1968	1,246	—
1975	1,117	−1.55%
1982	1,082	−0.45%
1990	1,089	+0.08%
1999	1,048	−0.43%
2007	1,183	+1.53%
2012	1,239	+0.93%
2017	1,223	−0.26%
2023	1,116	−1.51%
Source: INSEE

== See also ==
- Communes of the Creuse department
