= Canton of Bénévent-l'Abbaye =

Coordinates: 46°04′23″N 1°38′51″E

Bénévent-l'Abbaye
- Former canton
- Interactive map of Bénévent-l'Abbaye
- Country: France
- Region: Nouvelle-Aquitaine
- Department: Creuse
- No. of communes: {{{nbcomm}}}
- Disbanded: 2015
- Area: 191.42 km^{2} (73.91 sq mi)
- Population (2012): 3,324
  - Density: 17.36/km^{2} (44.98/sq mi)

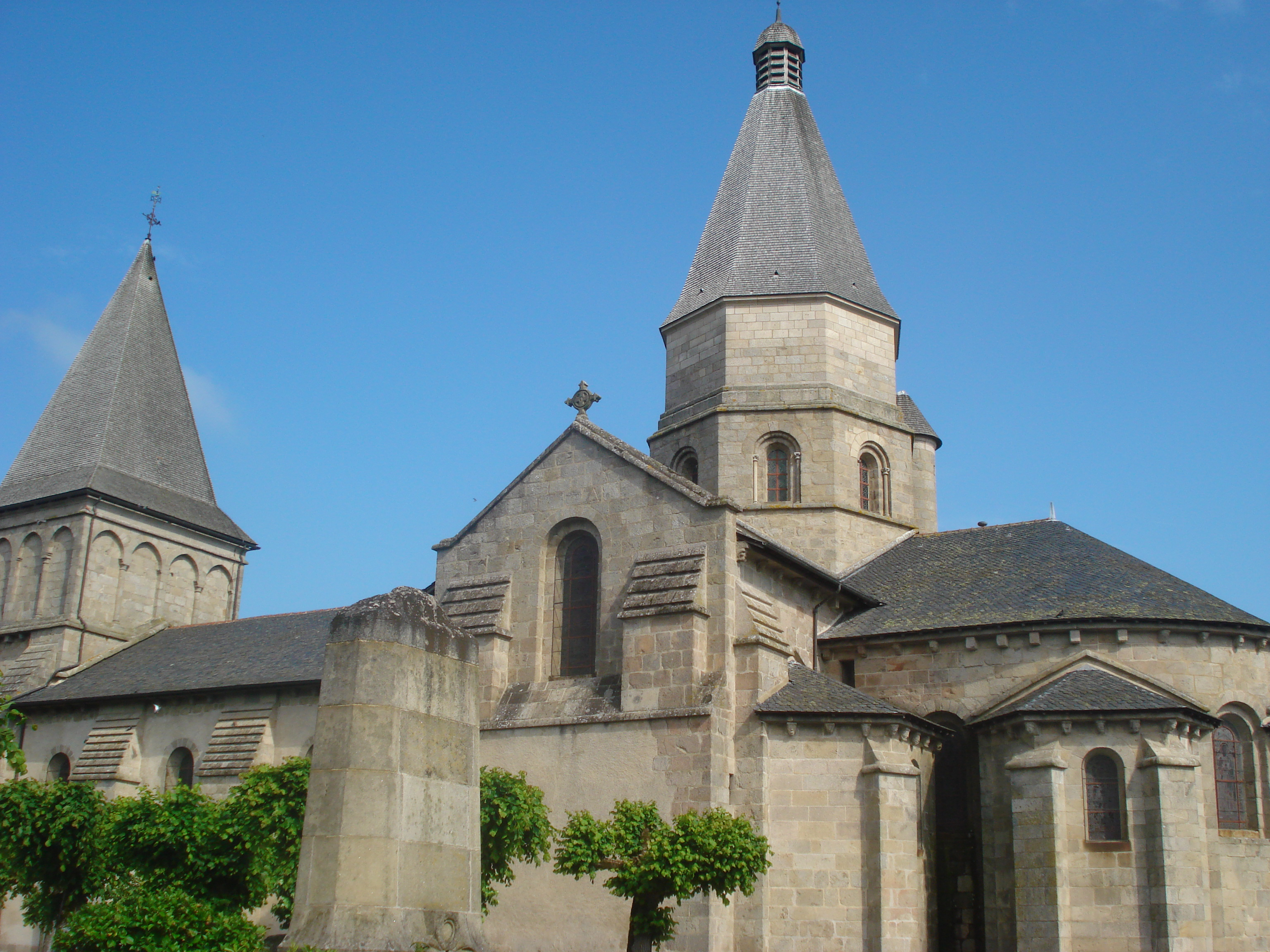
The church at Bénévent-l'Abbaye

The Canton of Bénévent-l'Abbaye was a canton situated in the Creuse département and in the Limousin region of central France. It was disbanded following the French canton reorganisation which came into effect in March 2015. It consisted of 10 communes, which joined the canton of Le Grand-Bourg in 2015. It had 3,324 inhabitants (2012).

== Geography ==
An area of farming and forestry in the arrondissement of Guéret, centred on the town of Bénévent-l'Abbaye. The altitude varies from 294 m (Châtelus-le-Marcheix) to 693 m (Saint-Goussaud) with an average altitude of 459 m.

The canton comprised 10 communes:

- Arrènes
- Augères
- Aulon
- Azat-Châtenet
- Bénévent-l'Abbaye
- Ceyroux
- Châtelus-le-Marcheix
- Marsac
- Mourioux-Vieilleville
- Saint-Goussaud

== Population ==
Historical population Canton of Bénévent-l'Abbaye
Year	1962	1968	1975	1982	1990	1999
Pop.	4,805	5,305	4,750	4,248	3,734	3,495
±%	—	+10.4%	−10.5%	−10.6%	−12.1%	−6.4%
From the year 1962 on: No double counting – residents of multiple communes (e.g. students and military personnel) are counted only once. Source: INSEE

== See also ==
- Arrondissements of the Creuse department
- Cantons of the Creuse department
- Communes of the Creuse department
