= Bénévent (disambiguation) =

Bénévent, French word for Benevento, may refer to several places:

== France ==
- Bénévent-et-Charbillac, a commune of the Hautes-Alpes department
- Bénévent-l'Abbaye, a commune of the Creuse department
- Nossage-et-Bénévent, a commune Hautes-Alpes department
- Bénévent-Grand-Bourg, a communauté de communes of the Creuse department
- Canton of Bénévent-l'Abbaye, a canton of the Creuse department

== Italy ==
- Benevento, a town seat of the homonymous province
  - Witches of Benevento, an alleged group of witches who lived in Benevento, Italy
- Province of Benevento, a province of Campania region
- Duchy of Benevento (later the Principality of Benevento) a medieval duchy which formed the southern part of the former Lombard Kingdom of Italy and later became a de facto independent rump state
- Serie A side Benevento Calcio.

== See also ==
- Benavente
