= San Martín National Institute =

Building in Argentina

Coordinates: 34°34′50″S 58°24′05″W

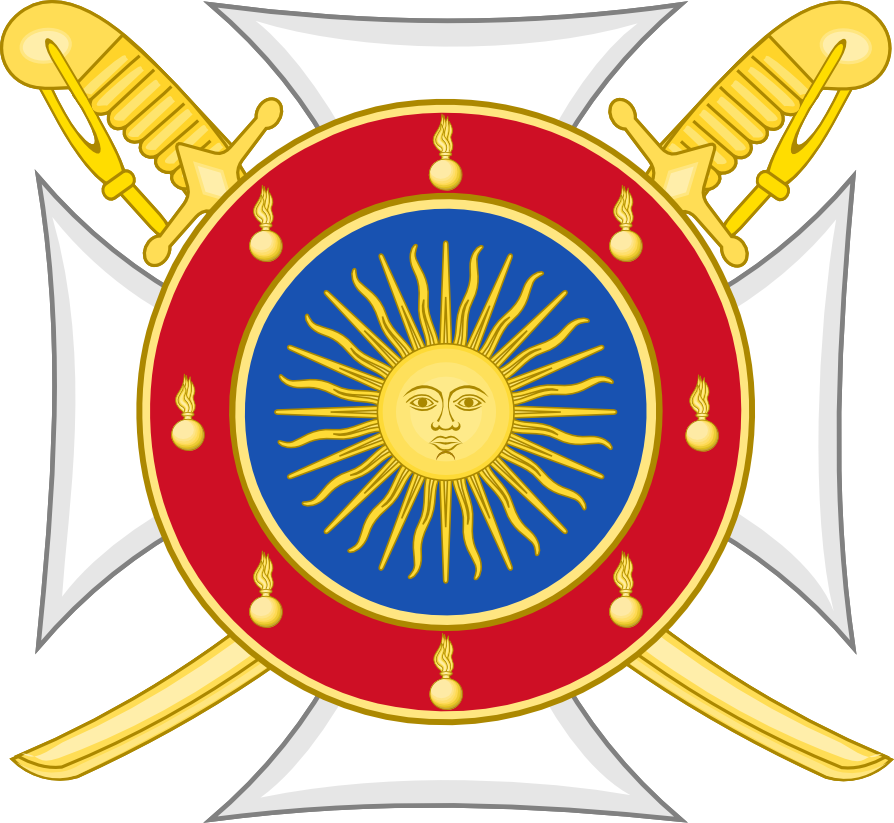
Emblem of the Instituto Nacional Sanmartiniano.

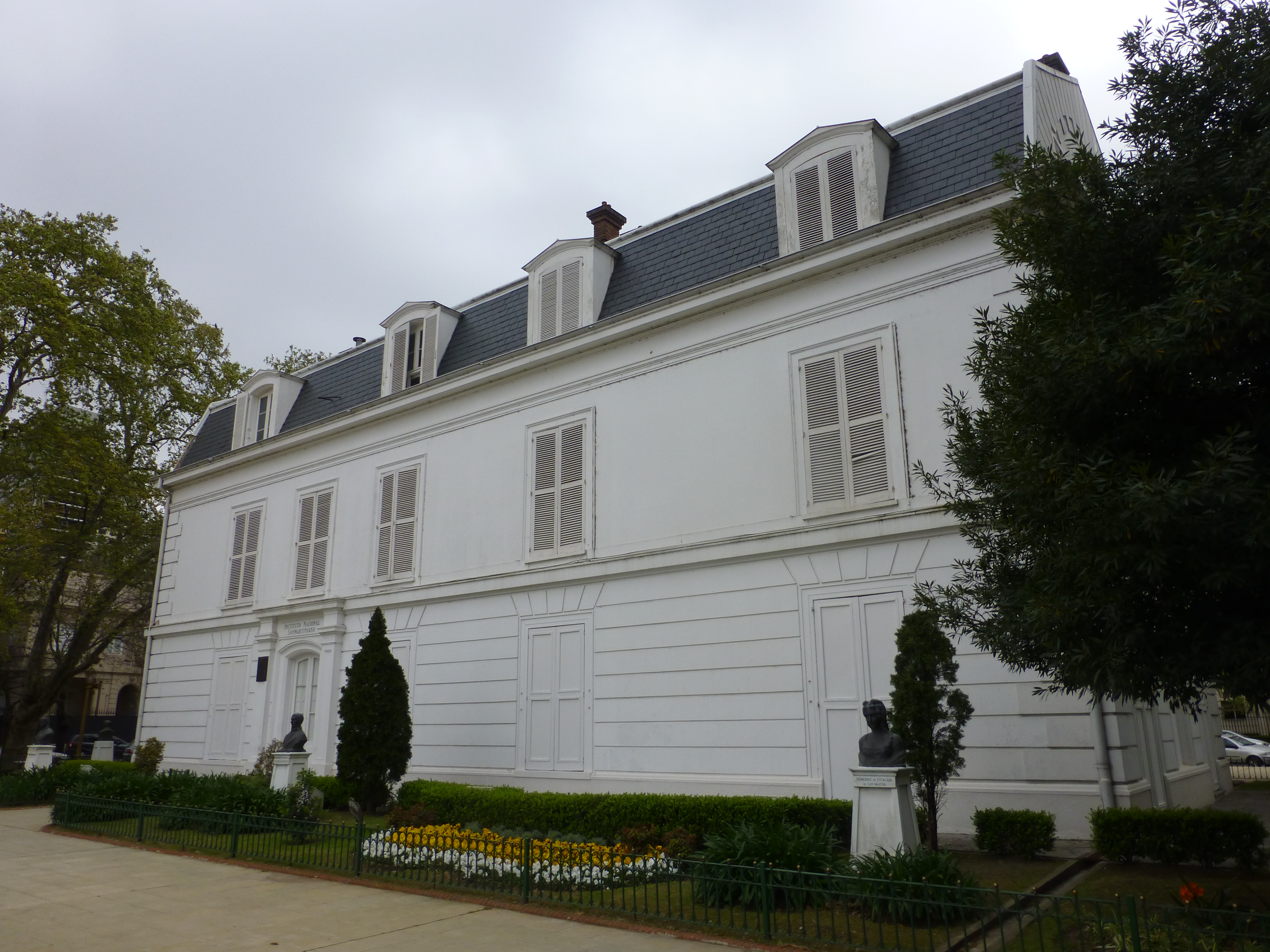
The San Martín National Institute, a replica of the military leader's Le Grand-Bourg home.

The San Martín National Institute (Instituto Nacional Sanmartiniano) is a cultural foundation in Buenos Aires dedicated to the legacy of General José de San Martín, the Liberator of Argentina, Chile, and Peru.

== Overview ==
The San Martín Institute was founded on April 5, 1933 (the 115th anniversary of the Battle of Maipú), by a member of the Military Officers' Association, Dr. José Pacífico Otero. The Battle of Maipú was a decisive milestone in the Chilean War of Independence and was, consequently, critical to the success of the Argentine War of Independence, as well.

Dr. Otero directed the institute until his death in 1937, and his widow, Manuela Stegmann de Otero, created an endowment in 1941 for the purpose of building a new headquarters. Plans were then drawn up for the reproduction of San Martín's erstwhile home in Le Grand-Bourg, France. The military leader had been exiled from Argentina as a result of political intrigue in 1824, and this austere, French provincial home was his residence between 1834 and 1848. The project met with official approval, and the mayor of Buenos Aires, Basilio Pertiné, had the city donate a prime, 290 m^{2} (3,100 ft²) lot in the city's Palermo section for its construction, and in 1944, President Edelmiro Farrell designated it a national institute under the aegis of the Ministry of War; its first proceedings as a national institute were convened on June 27, 1945.

The new headquarters was inaugurated on August 11, 1946, and during the presidency of Juan Perón, the institute earned prominence through his policy of underscoring the historical and cultural importance of San Martín, who had died in exile and dependent on the kindness of a French admirer, in 1850. Perón had his remains returned in 1947 to Argentina, where they were laid to rest in a cenotaph inside the Buenos Aires Metropolitan Cathedral. That year, the history of San Martín was first offered as a college major in Argentine higher education at the University of La Plata, and 1950 was declared the "Year of General San Martín, the Liberator."

The following year saw the unveiling of a monument by local sculptor Ángel Ibarra García in a plaza facing the institute. The monument, known as The Eternal Grandfather, is the only one portraying San Martín in later life. Official support helped the institute open its first overseas affiliate, in San Salvador in 1957, and this was followed by ones in Santiago (1960), Montevideo (1962), Cuzco and Madrid (1964), Rome, Brussels and Paris (1969), Los Angeles and New York (1972), as well as numerous others (including one in Boulogne-Sur-Mer, where he died in 1850). The institute coordinates its many overseas affiliates.

The Ministry of Defense transferred control over the institute to the Secretariat of Culture during Raúl Alfonsín's presidency, and in 1993, the Argentine Commission on Military History was created as its dependency. The commission hosts classes and seminars regarding both General San Martín and early Argentine military history in all continents. The institute originally vetted all local literature dealing with the hero of Argentine Independence, as well as any paintings or sculptures depicting him. Directed since 1992 by retired General Diego A. Soria, its role has more recently been an advisory one, and besides its academic activities, much of its endeavour has centered on reviewing the many historical novels written about the enigmatic San Martín in recent decades.

== Presidents ==
President	Term
José Pacífico Otero	1933–1937
Juan Esteban Vacarezza	1937–1941
Laurentino Olascoaga	1941–1944
Bartolomé Descalzo	1945–1960
José María Castiñeira de Dios	1950–1952
Jacinto Yaben	1952–1955
Ernesto Florit	1957–1965
Carlos Salas	1967–1970
Joaquín Aguilar Pinedo	1977–1983
Manuel Laprida	1984–1989
Tomas Sánchez de Bustamante	1989–1991
Diego Soria	1992–2012
Eduardo García Caffi	2012–2024
Claudio Morales Gorleri	2024-2025
CY (R) Dr. Hernán Federico Cornut	desde 2026

== References and external links ==
- Instituto Nacional Sanmartiniano (in Spanish)
