= Paul Larivaille =

French literary critic and academic (1932–2026)

- Born: 14 September 1932; Saint-Étienne-de-Fursac, France
- Died: 15 January 2026 (aged 93)
- Education: Scuola Normale Superiore di Pisa; Charles de Gaulle University – Lille III
- Occupations: Literary critic Academic

Paul Larivaille (French: [pɔl laʁivaj]; 14 September 1932 – 15 January 2026) was a French literary critic and academic.

== Life and career ==
Born in Saint-Étienne-de-Fursac on 14 September 1932, Larivaille earned an Agrégation d'italien in 1955 and a doctorate in 1972 from Charles de Gaulle University – Lille III. He began teaching at the Lycée de Montluçon from 1951 to 1954 before earning a scholarship to study at the Scuola Normale Superiore di Pisa. He then taught at the Lycée de garçons de Bourg-en-Bresse for two years. From 1959 to 1966, he taught at the Lycée Condorcet before moving on to Paris Nanterre University.

He grew his career significantly at Paris Nanterre, receiving the Prix Thérouanne in 1980 and supervising theses from the 1980s. From 1 June 1988 to 31 May 1993, he was president of the university, preceding and succeeding Michel Imberty. He also conducted research at the French National Centre for Scientific Research, retiring in 1996.

Larivaille died on 15 January 2026, at the age of 93.
