= Fursac =

Commune in Nouvelle-Aquitaine, France

- Commune
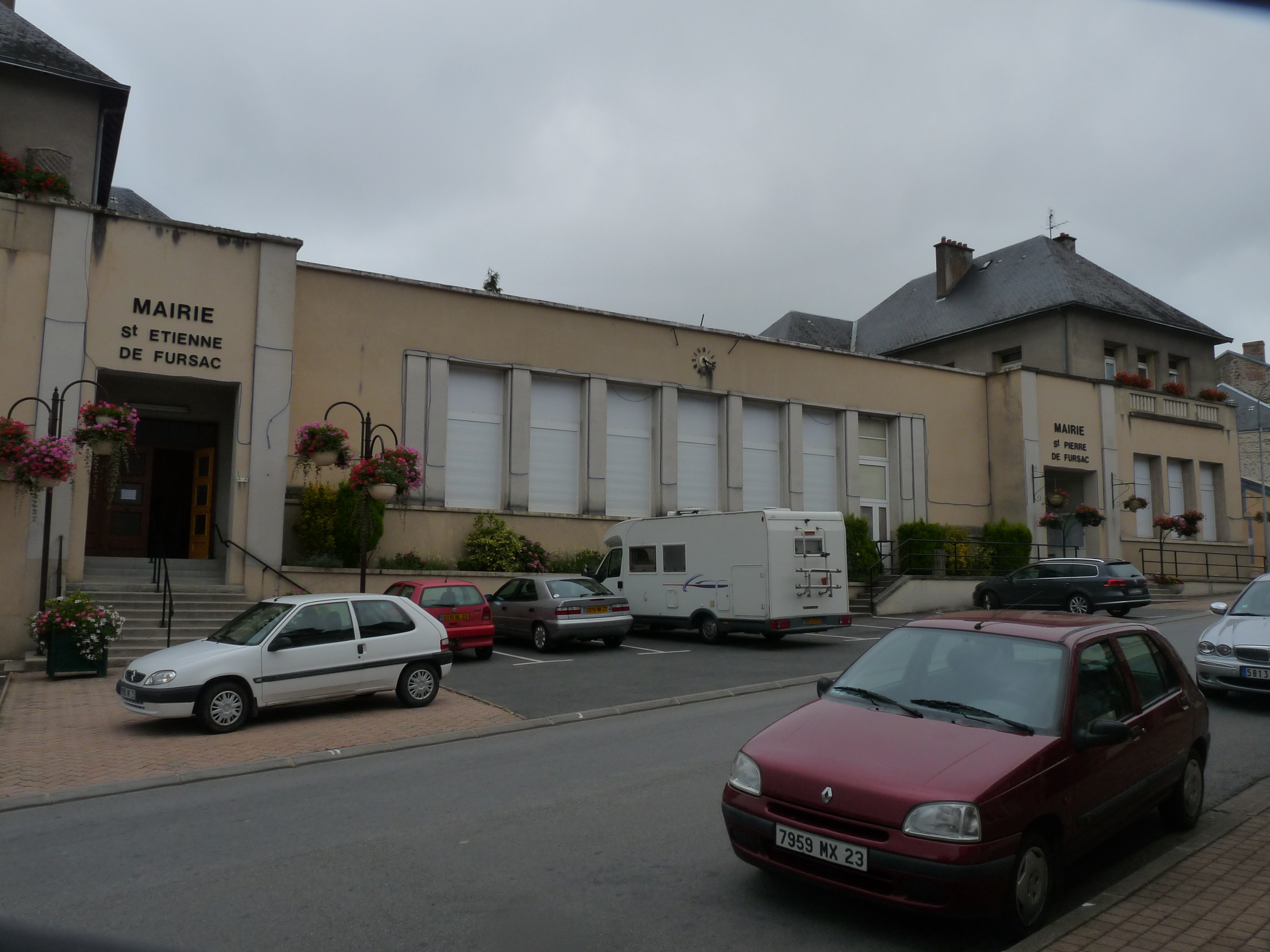
- The town hall of Fursac
- Location of Fursac
- Location within France Location within Nouvelle-Aquitaine
- Coordinates: 46°08′46″N 1°30′47″E
- Country: France
- Region: Nouvelle-Aquitaine
- Department: Creuse
- Arrondissement: Guéret
- Canton: Le Grand-Bourg
- Intercommunality: CC Bénévent-Grand-Bourg

Government
  - Mayor (2020–2026): Olivier Mouveroux
- Area^{1}: 59.03 km^{2} (22.79 sq mi)
- Population (2023): 1,430
  - Density: 24.2/km^{2} (62.7/sq mi)
- Time zone: UTC+01:00 (CET)
  - Summer (DST): UTC+02:00 (CEST)
- INSEE/Postal code: 23192 /23290
- ^{1} French Land Register data, which excludes lakes, ponds, glaciers > 1 km^{2} (0.386 sq mi or 247 acres) and river estuaries.

Fursac (French pronunciation: [fyʁsak]; Occitan: Furçac) is a commune in the department of Creuse, central France. The municipality was established on 1 January 2017 by merger of the former communes of Saint-Étienne-de-Fursac (the seat) and Saint-Pierre-de-Fursac.

== See also ==
- Communes of the Creuse department
