= Benavente =

Benavente may refer to:

== Places ==
- Benavente, Portugal, a municipality in Portugal
- Benavente, Zamora, a municipality in Zamora province, Spain
- Benavente (Hormigueros), a district of Hormigueros, Puerto Rico
- Benavente, Guam, a municipality in Guam

== Other uses ==
- Benavente (surname), a Spanish surname

== See also ==
- Benevento
- Bénévent
