= Fleurat =

Commune in Nouvelle-Aquitaine, France

- Commune
- Location of Fleurat
- Location within France Location within Nouvelle-Aquitaine
- Coordinates: 46°14′29″N 1°40′47″E
- Country: France
- Region: Nouvelle-Aquitaine
- Department: Creuse
- Arrondissement: Guéret
- Canton: Le Grand-Bourg
- Intercommunality: CC Bénévent-Grand-Bourg

Government
  - Mayor (2020–2026): Michel Ringuet
- Area^{1}: 12.3 km^{2} (4.7 sq mi)
- Elevation: 500 m (1,600 ft)
- Highest elevation: 539 m (1,768 ft)
- Lowest elevation: 349 m (1,145 ft)
- Population (2023): 311
  - Density: 25.3/km^{2} (65.5/sq mi)
- Time zone: UTC+01:00 (CET)
  - Summer (DST): UTC+02:00 (CEST)
- INSEE/Postal code: 23082 /23320
- ^{1} French Land Register data, which excludes lakes, ponds, glaciers > 1 km^{2} (0.386 sq mi or 247 acres) and river estuaries.

Fleurat (French pronunciation: [flœʁa]; Occitan: Fleurac) is a commune in the Creuse department in the Nouvelle-Aquitaine region in central France.

== Geography ==
A farming village situated some 12 miles (19 km) northwest of Guéret at the junction of the D56, D5 and the N145 roads.

== Population ==
Historical population
Year	Pop.	±% p.a.
1968	316	—
1975	281	−1.66%
1982	253	−1.49%
1990	255	+0.10%
1999	273	+0.76%
2007	267	−0.28%
2012	284	+1.24%
2017	309	+1.70%
2023	311	+0.11%
Source: INSEE

== Sights ==
- The church, dating from the twelfth century.

== See also ==
- Communes of the Creuse department
