= Saint-Bonnet-en-Champsaur =

- Commune
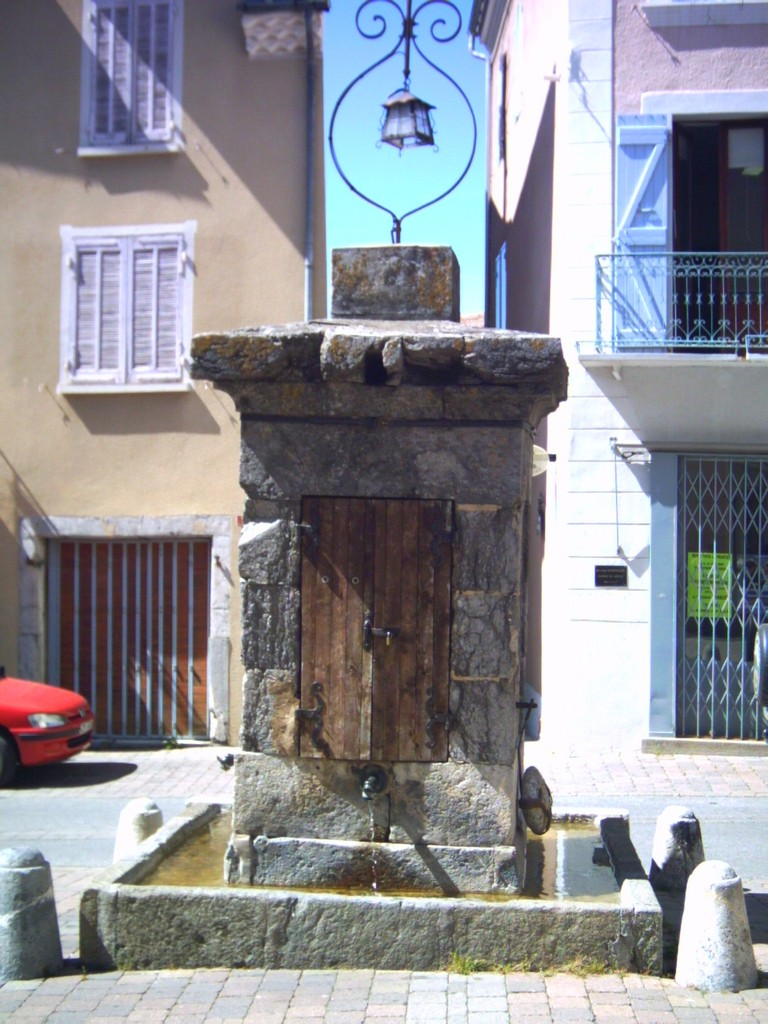
- The fountain in Grenette square, in Saint-Bonnet

- Coat of arms
- Location of Saint-Bonnet-en-Champsaur
- Location within France Location within Provence-Alpes-Côte d'Azur
- Coordinates: 44°40′55″N 6°04′35″E
- Country: France
- Region: Provence-Alpes-Côte d'Azur
- Department: Hautes-Alpes
- Arrondissement: Gap
- Canton: Saint-Bonnet-en-Champsaur

Government
  - Mayor (2026–32): Marie-Anne Bourgeois
- Area^{1}: 15.01 km^{2} (5.80 sq mi)
- Elevation: 1,040 m (3,410 ft)
- Highest elevation: 2,440 m (8,010 ft)
- Lowest elevation: 939 m (3,081 ft)
- Population (2023): 2,086
  - Density: 139.0/km^{2} (359.9/sq mi)
- Time zone: UTC+01:00 (CET)
  - Summer (DST): UTC+02:00 (CEST)
- INSEE/Postal code: 05132 /05500
- ^{1} French Land Register data, which excludes lakes, ponds, glaciers > 1 km^{2} (0.386 sq mi or 247 acres) and river estuaries.

Saint-Bonnet-en-Champsaur (Occitan: Sant Bonet; named for Saint Bonitus, before 1988: Saint-Bonnet) is a commune in the Hautes-Alpes department in southeastern France. It was expanded in January 2013, following the merger of the former communes of Bénévent-et-Charbillac and Les Infournas.

== Geography ==
The commune is located in the valley of the high Drac, on the major route between Gap and Grenoble (route Napoléon) next to Écrins National Park. It is 15 km from Gap over the Col Bayard and 90 km from Grenoble. The commune forms a triangle of which the base is the Drac and the apex is Queyrel Peak. The landscape is primarily mountain pasture.

=== Climate ===
Located in the Haut-Dauphiné, Saint-Bonnet-en-Champsaur's climate is a mix of the Mediterranean and alpine. The average annual temperature in Saint-Bonnet-en-Champsaur is 8.9 °C (48.0 °F). The average annual rainfall is 1,066.4 mm (41.98 in) with October as the wettest month. The temperatures are highest on average in July, at around 18.0 °C (64.4 °F), and lowest in January, at around 0.1 °C (32.2 °F). The highest temperature ever recorded in Saint-Bonnet-en-Champsaur was 35.0 °C (95.0 °F) on 28 July 2005; the coldest temperature ever recorded was −19.0 °C (−2.2 °F) on 14 February 1999.

Climate data for Saint-Bonnet-en-Champsaur (1981–2010 averages, extremes 1986−2007)
| Month | Jan | Feb | Mar | Apr | May | Jun | Jul | Aug | Sep | Oct | Nov | Dec | Year |
|---|---|---|---|---|---|---|---|---|---|---|---|---|---|
| Record high °C (°F) | 18.0 (64.4) | 20.0 (68.0) | 24.0 (75.2) | 26.0 (78.8) | 29.0 (84.2) | 34.0 (93.2) | 35.0 (95.0) | 33.0 (91.4) | 33.0 (91.4) | 26.0 (78.8) | 21.5 (70.7) | 17.0 (62.6) | 35.0 (95.0) |
| Mean daily maximum °C (°F) | 4.6 (40.3) | 6.0 (42.8) | 10.3 (50.5) | 12.6 (54.7) | 18.1 (64.6) | 21.7 (71.1) | 24.7 (76.5) | 24.6 (76.3) | 19.5 (67.1) | 14.9 (58.8) | 7.9 (46.2) | 4.7 (40.5) | 14.2 (57.6) |
| Daily mean °C (°F) | 0.1 (32.2) | 1.2 (34.2) | 4.9 (40.8) | 7.4 (45.3) | 12.2 (54.0) | 15.4 (59.7) | 18.0 (64.4) | 17.9 (64.2) | 13.8 (56.8) | 10.1 (50.2) | 4.0 (39.2) | 0.9 (33.6) | 8.9 (48.0) |
| Mean daily minimum °C (°F) | −4.3 (24.3) | −3.6 (25.5) | −0.5 (31.1) | 2.1 (35.8) | 6.2 (43.2) | 9.0 (48.2) | 11.3 (52.3) | 11.2 (52.2) | 8.1 (46.6) | 5.2 (41.4) | 0.1 (32.2) | −3.0 (26.6) | 3.5 (38.3) |
| Record low °C (°F) | −19.0 (−2.2) | −19.0 (−2.2) | −15.0 (5.0) | −8.0 (17.6) | −2.0 (28.4) | 0.0 (32.0) | 2.0 (35.6) | 2.5 (36.5) | −2.0 (28.4) | −6.0 (21.2) | −13.0 (8.6) | −16.0 (3.2) | −19.0 (−2.2) |
| Average precipitation mm (inches) | 78.2 (3.08) | 60.0 (2.36) | 59.4 (2.34) | 91.2 (3.59) | 96.7 (3.81) | 77.9 (3.07) | 49.5 (1.95) | 62.1 (2.44) | 107.6 (4.24) | 151.4 (5.96) | 122.7 (4.83) | 109.7 (4.32) | 1,066.4 (41.98) |
| Average precipitation days (≥ 1.0 mm) | 8.0 | 7.2 | 8.0 | 10.0 | 10.8 | 8.8 | 6.4 | 7.2 | 7.9 | 10.3 | 8.6 | 8.6 | 101.8 |
Source: Meteociel

== Population ==
The inhabitants are called Saint-Bonnetiers. The population data in the table and graph below refer to the commune of Saint-Bonnet-en-Champsaur proper, in its geography at the given years. The commune of Saint-Bonnet-en-Champsaur absorbed the former communes of Bénévent-et-Charbillac and Les Infournas in 2013.

Historical population

| Year | Pop. | ±% p.a. |
|---|---|---|
| 1793 | 1,550 | — |
| 1800 | 1,408 | −1.36% |
| 1806 | 1,675 | +2.94% |
| 1821 | 1,611 | −0.26% |
| 1831 | 1,800 | +1.12% |
| 1836 | 1,700 | −1.14% |
| 1841 | 1,790 | +1.04% |
| 1846 | 1,847 | +0.63% |
| 1851 | 1,734 | −1.25% |
| 1856 | 1,771 | +0.42% |
| 1861 | 1,745 | −0.30% |
| 1866 | 1,789 | +0.50% |
| 1872 | 1,758 | −0.29% |
| 1876 | 1,670 | −1.28% |
| 1881 | 1,763 | +1.09% |
| 1886 | 1,744 | −0.22% |
| 1891 | 1,616 | −1.51% |
| 1896 | 1,665 | +0.60% |

| Year | Pop. | ±% p.a. |
|---|---|---|
| 1901 | 1,515 | −1.87% |
| 1906 | 1,506 | −0.12% |
| 1911 | 1,511 | +0.07% |
| 1921 | 1,239 | −1.97% |
| 1926 | 1,321 | +1.29% |
| 1931 | 1,311 | −0.15% |
| 1936 | 1,357 | +0.69% |
| 1946 | 1,166 | −1.51% |
| 1954 | 1,182 | +0.17% |
| 1962 | 1,196 | +0.15% |
| 1968 | 1,199 | +0.04% |
| 1975 | 1,236 | +0.44% |
| 1982 | 1,263 | +0.31% |
| 1990 | 1,371 | +1.03% |
| 1999 | 1,466 | +0.75% |
| 2007 | 1,677 | +1.70% |
| 2017 | 2,036 | +1.96% |
| 2023 | 2,086 | +0.41% |

Source: EHESS and INSEE (2007-2023)

=== Vivian Maier ===
Street photographer Vivian Maier lived and photographed in the vicinity of Saint-Bonnet-en-Champsaur and Saint-Julien-en-Champsaur. While many details of Maier's life remain unknown, she was the daughter of a French mother, Maria Jaussaud, and several times during her childhood she moved between the U.S. and France, living with her mother in the Alpine village of Saint-Bonnet-en-Champsaur near her mother's relations. In 1935, Vivian and her mother, Maria, were living in Saint-Julien-en-Champsaur and prior to 1940 returned to New York City.

== See also ==
- Communes of the Hautes-Alpes department
