= Lizières =

Commune in Nouvelle-Aquitaine, France

- Commune
- Location of Lizières
- Location within France Location within Nouvelle-Aquitaine
- Coordinates: 46°12′42″N 1°34′29″E
- Country: France
- Region: Nouvelle-Aquitaine
- Department: Creuse
- Arrondissement: Guéret
- Canton: Le Grand-Bourg
- Intercommunality: CC Bénévent-Grand-Bourg

Government
  - Mayor (2020–2026): Évelyne Chetif
- Area^{1}: 14.67 km^{2} (5.66 sq mi)
- Elevation: 420 m (1,380 ft)
- Highest elevation: 465 m (1,526 ft)
- Lowest elevation: 345 m (1,132 ft)
- Population (2023): 234
  - Density: 16.0/km^{2} (41.3/sq mi)
- Time zone: UTC+01:00 (CET)
  - Summer (DST): UTC+02:00 (CEST)
- INSEE/Postal code: 23111 /23240
- ^{1} French Land Register data, which excludes lakes, ponds, glaciers > 1 km^{2} (0.386 sq mi or 247 acres) and river estuaries.

Lizières (French pronunciation: [lizjɛʁ]; Occitan: Lisieras) is a commune in the Creuse department in the Nouvelle-Aquitaine region in central France.

== Geography ==
An area of lakes and farming, comprising the village and a few small hamlets, situated some 18 miles (29 km) west of Guéret on the D49 near its junction with the N145 road. The river Gartempe forms much of the southern boundary of the commune's territory.

== Population ==
Historical population
Year	Pop.	±% p.a.
1968	355	—
1975	310	−1.92%
1982	313	+0.14%
1990	303	−0.41%
1999	284	−0.72%
2007	259	−1.15%
2012	296	+2.71%
2017	268	−1.97%
2023	234	−2.24%
Source: INSEE

== Sights ==
- The church, dating from the fifteenth century.

== See also ==
- Communes of the Creuse department
