= Les Infournas =

- Part of Saint-Bonnet-en-Champsaur
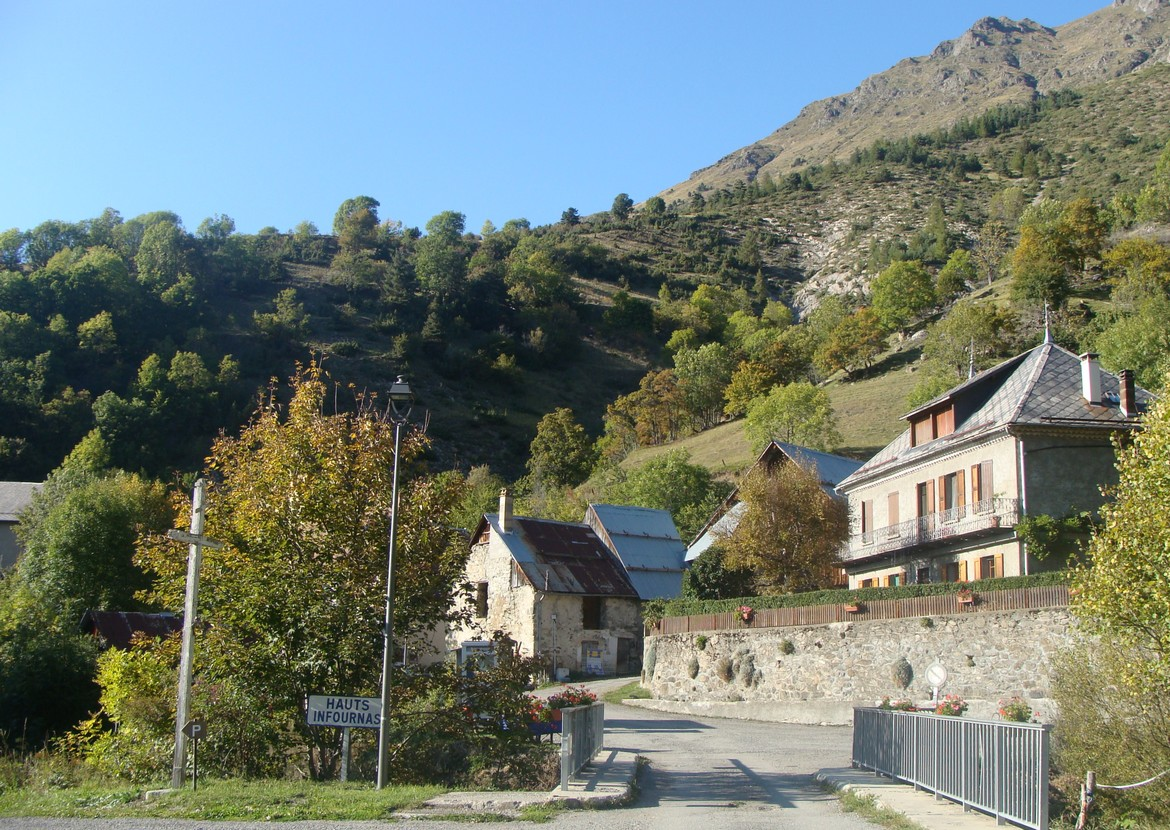
- The hamlet of Infournas-hauts, seen from the access road
- Location of Les Infournas
- Location within France Location within Provence-Alpes-Côte d'Azur
- Coordinates: 44°42′57″N 6°05′40″E
- Country: France
- Region: Provence-Alpes-Côte d'Azur
- Department: Hautes-Alpes
- Arrondissement: Gap
- Canton: Saint-Bonnet-en-Champsaur
- Commune: Saint-Bonnet-en-Champsaur
- Area^{1}: 8.69 km^{2} (3.36 sq mi)
- Elevation: 1,235 m (4,052 ft)
- Highest elevation: 2,442 m (8,012 ft)
- Lowest elevation: 1,158 m (3,799 ft)
- Population (2023): 28
  - Density: 3.2/km^{2} (8.3/sq mi)
- Time zone: UTC+01:00 (CET)
  - Summer (DST): UTC+02:00 (CEST)
- Postal code: 05500
- ^{1} French Land Register data, which excludes lakes, ponds, glaciers > 1 km^{2} (0.386 sq mi or 247 acres) and river estuaries.

Les Infournas (Vivaro-Alpine: Infornats) is a former commune in the Hautes-Alpes department in southeastern France. Since 2013 it is part of the commune Saint-Bonnet-en-Champsaur.

== See also ==
- Communes of the Hautes-Alpes department
