= Saint-Priest-la-Plaine =

Commune in Nouvelle-Aquitaine, France

- Commune
- Coat of arms
- Location of Saint-Priest-la-Plaine
- Location within France Location within Nouvelle-Aquitaine
- Coordinates: 46°11′32″N 1°37′45″E
- Country: France
- Region: Nouvelle-Aquitaine
- Department: Creuse
- Arrondissement: Guéret
- Canton: Le Grand-Bourg
- Intercommunality: CC Bénévent-Grand-Bourg

Government
  - Mayor (2020–2026): Jean-Paul Chaput
- Area^{1}: 21.9 km^{2} (8.5 sq mi)
- Elevation: 450 m (1,480 ft)
- Highest elevation: 454 m (1,490 ft)
- Lowest elevation: 353 m (1,158 ft)
- Population (2023): 258
  - Density: 11.8/km^{2} (30.5/sq mi)
- Time zone: UTC+01:00 (CET)
  - Summer (DST): UTC+02:00 (CEST)
- INSEE/Postal code: 23236 /23240
- ^{1} French Land Register data, which excludes lakes, ponds, glaciers > 1 km^{2} (0.386 sq mi or 247 acres) and river estuaries.

Saint-Priest-la-Plaine (French pronunciation: [sɛ̃ pʁijɛ(st) la plɛn]; Occitan: Sant Prit la Plana) is a commune in the Creuse department in central France.

== Population ==
Historical population
| Year | Pop. | ±% p.a. |
|---|---|---|
| 1968 | 520 | — |
| 1975 | 427 | −2.78% |
| 1982 | 367 | −2.14% |
| 1990 | 310 | −2.09% |
| 1999 | 287 | −0.85% |
| 2007 | 281 | −0.26% |
| 2012 | 244 | −2.78% |
| 2017 | 260 | +1.28% |
| 2023 | 258 | −0.13% |
Source: INSEE

== See also ==
- Communes of the Creuse department
