= Arrènes =

Commune in Nouvelle-Aquitaine, France

- Commune
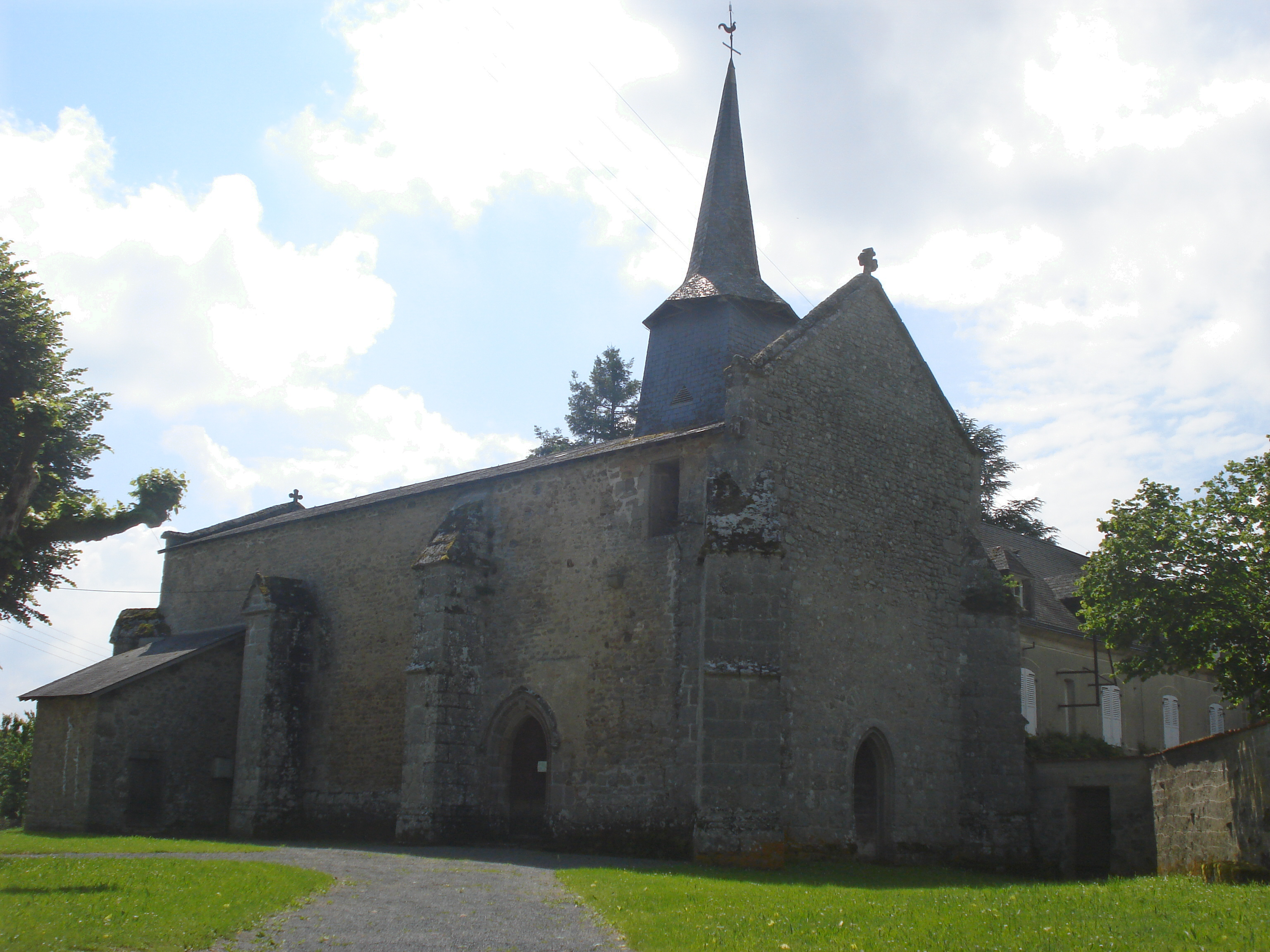
- The church of Arrènes
- Location of Arrènes
- Location within France Location within Nouvelle-Aquitaine
- Coordinates: 46°04′20″N 1°34′15″E
- Country: France
- Region: Nouvelle-Aquitaine
- Department: Creuse
- Arrondissement: Guéret
- Canton: Le Grand-Bourg
- Intercommunality: CC Bénévent-Grand-Bourg

Government
  - Mayor (2022–2026): Michael Pluviaud
- Area^{1}: 22.56 km^{2} (8.71 sq mi)
- Highest elevation: 640 m (2,100 ft)
- Lowest elevation: 329 m (1,079 ft)
- Population (2023): 202
  - Density: 8.95/km^{2} (23.2/sq mi)
- Time zone: UTC+01:00 (CET)
  - Summer (DST): UTC+02:00 (CEST)
- INSEE/Postal code: 23006 /23210
- ^{1} French Land Register data, which excludes lakes, ponds, glaciers > 1 km^{2} (0.386 sq mi or 247 acres) and river estuaries.

Arrènes (French pronunciation: [aʁɛn]; Occitan: 'Rena) is a commune in the Creuse department in the Nouvelle-Aquitaine region in central France.

== Geography ==
A farming area comprising the village and several hamlets, situated by the banks of the small river Moulard some 20 miles (32 km) southwest of Guéret, at the junction of the D48 and the D50 with the D57, the Via St.Jacques de Compostella pilgrimage route.

== Population ==
Historical population
Year	Pop.	±% p.a.
1968	450	—
1975	360	−3.14%
1982	286	−3.23%
1990	269	−0.76%
1999	244	−1.08%
2007	221	−1.23%
2012	229	+0.71%
2017	218	−0.98%
2023	202	−1.26%
Source: INSEE

== Sights ==
- The church of St.Pierre, dating from the fifteenth century.
- Traces of a Benedictine priory dating from the fourteenth century.
- The fifteenth century Château de Sazeirat.
- The chapel de Reix, from the eighteenth century.

== See also ==
- Communes of the Creuse department
