= Chamborand =

Commune in Nouvelle-Aquitaine, France

- Commune
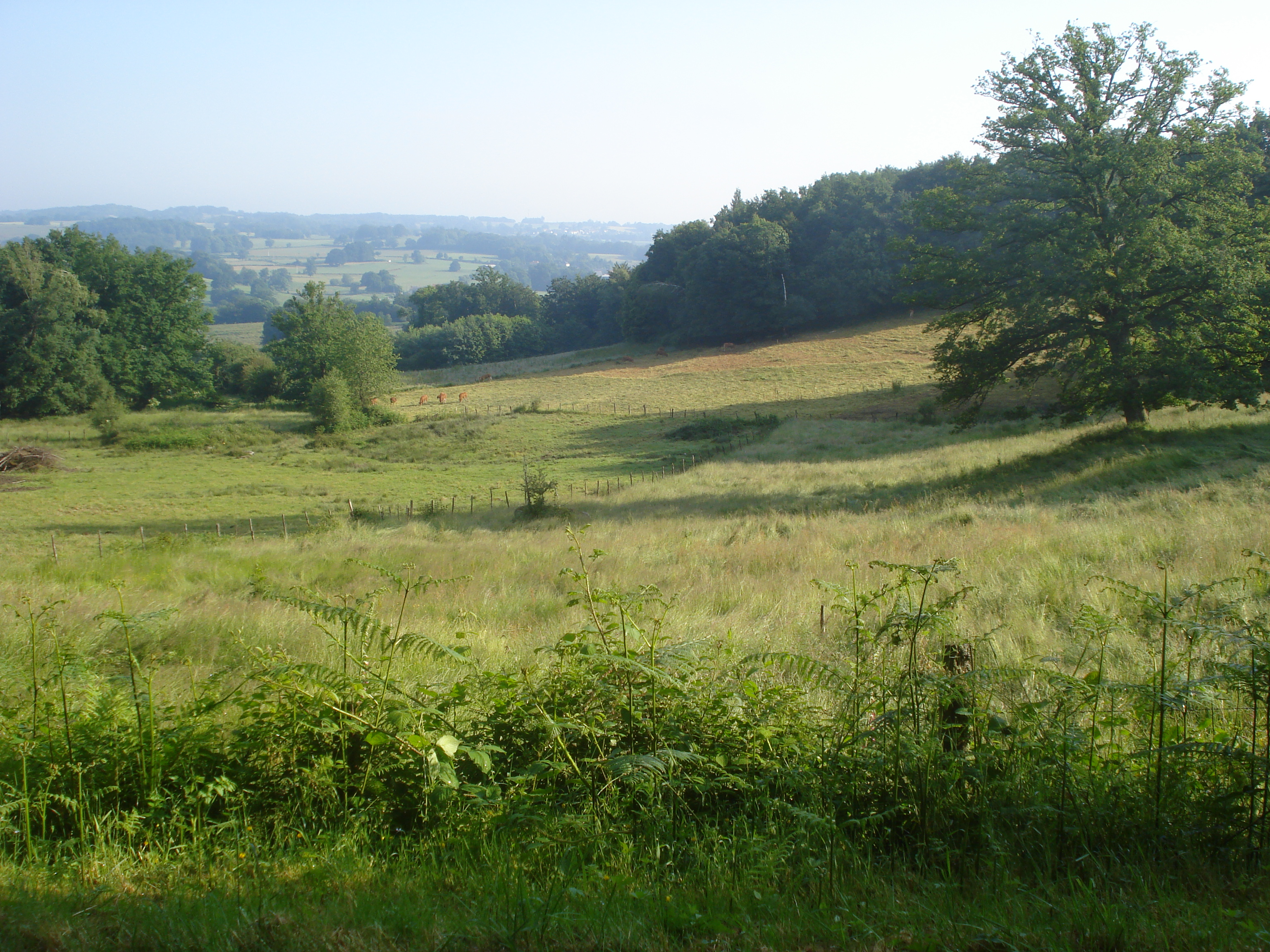
- The landscape around Chamborand

- Coat of arms
- Location of Chamborand
- Location within France Location within Nouvelle-Aquitaine
- Coordinates: 46°09′24″N 1°34′23″E
- Country: France
- Region: Nouvelle-Aquitaine
- Department: Creuse
- Arrondissement: Guéret
- Canton: Le Grand-Bourg
- Intercommunality: CC Bénévent-Grand-Bourg

Government
  - Mayor (2020–2026): Jean-François Lebon
- Area^{1}: 11.18 km^{2} (4.32 sq mi)
- Elevation: 426 m (1,398 ft)
- Highest elevation: 479 m (1,572 ft)
- Lowest elevation: 340 m (1,120 ft)
- Population (2023): 241
  - Density: 21.6/km^{2} (55.8/sq mi)
- Time zone: UTC+01:00 (CET)
  - Summer (DST): UTC+02:00 (CEST)
- INSEE/Postal code: 23047 /23240
- ^{1} French Land Register data, which excludes lakes, ponds, glaciers > 1 km^{2} (0.386 sq mi or 247 acres) and river estuaries.

Chamborand (French pronunciation: [ʃɑ̃bɔʁɑ̃]; Occitan: Chamboran) is a commune in the Creuse department in the Nouvelle-Aquitaine region in central France.

== Geography ==
A village of farming, forestry, streams and lakes situated some 15 miles (24 km) west of Guéret, at the junction of the D4, D49 and the D10 roads.

== Population ==
Historical population
Year	Pop.	±% p.a.
1968	310	—
1975	283	−1.29%
1982	277	−0.31%
1990	266	−0.51%
1999	237	−1.27%
2007	235	−0.11%
2012	239	+0.34%
2017	243	+0.33%
2023	241	−0.14%
Source: INSEE

== Sights ==
- The church of St. Martial, dating from the fifteenth century.
- Remains of a castle dating from the twelfth century, including the motte and a donjon.

== See also ==
- Communes of the Creuse department
