= Pierre Michon =

French writer (born 1945)

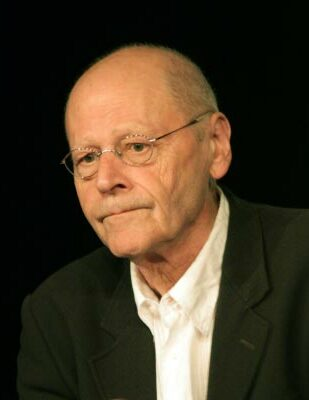
- Born: 28 March 1945 (age 81); Châtelus-le-Marcheix, Creuse, France
- Spouse: Yaël Pachet
- Writing career
- Genre: Fiction
- Notable awards: International Nonino Prize (2017); Franz Kafka Prize (2019)

Pierre Michon (born 28 March 1945 in Châtelus-le-Marcheix, Creuse) is a French writer. His first novel, Small Lives (1984), is widely regarded as a genuine masterpiece in contemporary French literature. He has won several prizes for Small Lives and for The Origin of the World (1996) as well as for his body of work. His novels and stories have been translated into German, Dutch, Italian, Spanish, Greek, Portuguese, Polish, Serbian, Czech, Norwegian, Estonian, Japanese and English. He won the 2017 International Nonino Prize in Italy.

With an oeuvre consisting of a stunning confessional novel—Vies minuscules (1984)—and a series of Plutarch-like "lives" devoted to famous artists and poets, Michon commands respect as a sensitive author and gifted stylist who seeks to comprehend how we can make sense out of the irrepressible impulses and unavoidable failures that fill our lives. Whether he is charting the misfortunes of the lowly, portraying his own difficult rise from rural poverty and a broken family to the completion of his first book, or plunging into the destinies of Watteau, Goya, Rimbaud, or Van Gogh, Michon poignantly captures the essence of the compelling courses our lives take.

== Works ==
- 1984: Small Lives (Vies minuscules).
  - Translated by Jody Gladding and Elizabeth Deshays for Archipelago Books, 2008.
- 1988: Life of Joseph Roulin (Vie de Joseph Roulin).
  - Translated by Wyatt Mason for Mercury House and included in Masters and Servants, 1997.
- 1997: L'empereur d'Occident.
- 1990: Masters and Servants (Maîtres et serviteurs).
  - Translated by Wyatt Mason for Mercury House, 1997.
- 1991: Rimbaud the Son (Rimbaud le fils).
  - Translated by Jody Gladding and Elizabeth Deshays for Yale University Press, 2013.
- 1996: The Origin of the World (La Grande Beune).
  - Translated by Wyatt Mason for Mercury House, 2002.
- 1996: The King of the Wood (Le roi du bois).
  - Translated by Wyatt Mason for Mercury House and included in Masters and Servants, 1997.
- 1997: Trois auteurs.
- 1997: Winter Mythologies (Mythologies d'hiver).
  - Translated by Ann Jefferson for Yale University Press, 2017.
- 2002: Abbots (Abbés).
  - Translated by Ann Jefferson for Yale University Press, 2017.
- 2002: Corps du roi.
- 2007: Le roi vient quand il veut : propos sur la littérature.
- 2009: The Eleven (Les Onze).
  - Translated by Jody Gladding and Elizabeth Deshays for Archipelago Books, 2013.

== Awards ==
- 2002: Prix Décembre
- 2009: Grand Prix du roman de l'Académie française
- 2010: Petrarca-Preis
- 2017: International Nonino Prize
- 2019: Franz Kafka Prize
