= Saint-Étienne-de-Fursac =

Part of Fursac in Nouvelle-Aquitaine, France

- Part of Fursac
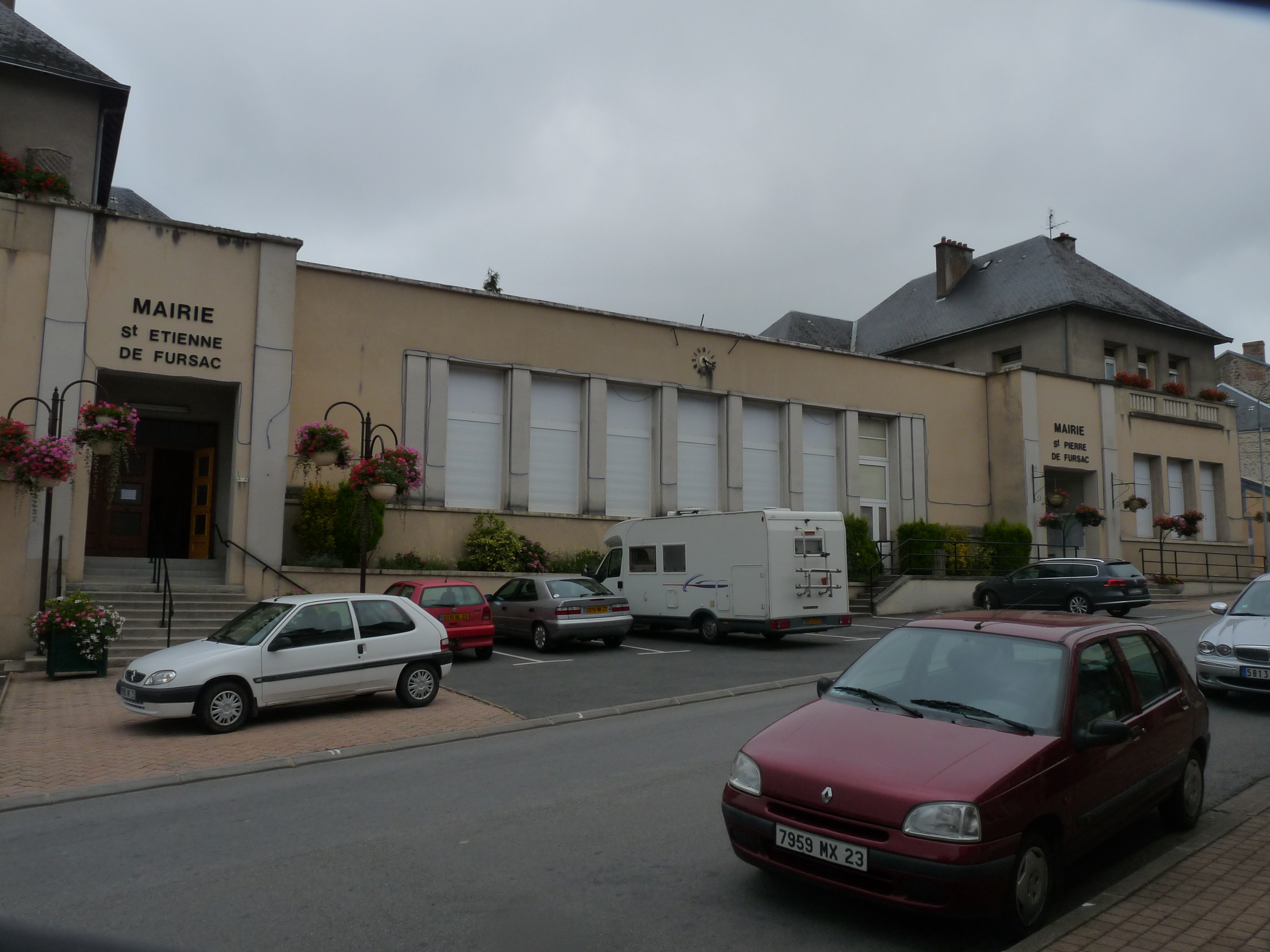
- Town hall
- Location of Saint-Étienne-de-Fursac
- Location within France Location within Nouvelle-Aquitaine
- Coordinates: 46°08′45″N 1°30′48″E
- Country: France
- Region: Nouvelle-Aquitaine
- Department: Creuse
- Arrondissement: Guéret
- Canton: Le Grand-Bourg
- Commune: Fursac
- Area^{1}: 31.7 km^{2} (12.2 sq mi)
- Elevation: 324 m (1,063 ft)
- Highest elevation: 471 m (1,545 ft)
- Lowest elevation: 316 m (1,037 ft)
- Population (2018): 740
  - Density: 23/km^{2} (60/sq mi)
- Time zone: UTC+01:00 (CET)
  - Summer (DST): UTC+02:00 (CEST)
- Postal code: 23290
- ^{1} French Land Register data, which excludes lakes, ponds, glaciers > 1 km^{2} (0.386 sq mi or 247 acres) and river estuaries.

Saint-Étienne-de-Fursac (French pronunciation: [sɛ̃.t‿etjɛn də fyʁsak]; Limousin: Furçac (Sent Estefe)) is a former commune in the Creuse department in central France. On 1 January 2017, it was merged into the new commune Fursac.

== Population ==
Historical population

Year	Pop.	±% p.a.
1793	1,528	—
1800	1,576	+0.44%
1806	1,540	−0.38%
1821	1,647	+0.45%
1831	1,843	+1.13%
1836	1,950	+1.14%
1841	1,945	−0.05%
1846	2,015	+0.71%
1851	2,051	+0.35%
1856	1,998	−0.52%
1861	2,029	+0.31%
1866	2,140	+1.07%
1872	2,117	−0.18%
1876	2,170	+0.62%
1881	2,294	+1.12%
1886	2,380	+0.74%
1891	2,339	−0.35%

Year	Pop.	±% p.a.
1896	2,343	+0.03%
1901	2,227	−1.01%
1906	2,067	−1.48%
1911	1,968	−0.98%
1921	1,789	−0.95%
1926	1,630	−1.84%
1931	1,577	−0.66%
1936	1,528	−0.63%
1946	1,416	−0.76%
1954	1,295	−1.11%
1962	1,248	−0.46%
1968	1,084	−2.32%
1975	882	−2.90%
1982	904	+0.35%
1990	843	−0.87%
1999	816	−0.36%
2018	740	−0.51%

Source: EHESS and INSEE

== See also ==
- Communes of the Creuse department
