= Azat-Châtenet =

Commune in Nouvelle-Aquitaine, France

- Commune
- Location of Azat-Châtenet
- Location within France Location within Nouvelle-Aquitaine
- Coordinates: 46°04′38″N 1°45′37″E
- Country: France
- Region: Nouvelle-Aquitaine
- Department: Creuse
- Arrondissement: Guéret
- Canton: Le Grand-Bourg
- Intercommunality: CC Bénévent-Grand-Bourg

Government
  - Mayor (2020–2026): Jean-Bernard Quinque
- Area^{1}: 9.51 km^{2} (3.67 sq mi)
- Elevation: 500 m (1,600 ft)
- Highest elevation: 565 m (1,854 ft)
- Lowest elevation: 436 m (1,430 ft)
- Population (2023): 108
  - Density: 11.4/km^{2} (29.4/sq mi)
- Time zone: UTC+01:00 (CET)
  - Summer (DST): UTC+02:00 (CEST)
- INSEE/Postal code: 23014 /23210
- ^{1} French Land Register data, which excludes lakes, ponds, glaciers > 1 km^{2} (0.386 sq mi or 247 acres) and river estuaries.

Azat-Châtenet (French pronunciation: [aza ʃatnɛ]; Occitan: Asac Chastanet) is a commune in the Creuse department in the Nouvelle-Aquitaine region in central France.

== Geography ==
An area of farming, forests and lakes, comprising a small village and several hamlets situated in the valley of the Leyrenne river, some 10 miles (16 km) southwest of Guéret at the junction of the D42 and the D61.

== Population ==
Historical population
Year	Pop.	±% p.a.
1968	210	—
1975	188	−1.57%
1982	168	−1.59%
1990	133	−2.88%
1999	133	+0.00%
2007	132	−0.09%
2012	119	−2.05%
2017	115	−0.68%
2023	108	−1.04%
Source: INSEE

== Sights ==
- The church of St.Julien, dating from the fourteenth century.
- A fourteenth-century stone cross.

== See also ==
- Communes of the Creuse department
