= Augères =

Commune in Nouvelle-Aquitaine, France

- Commune
- Coat of arms
- Location of Augères
- Location within France Location within Nouvelle-Aquitaine
- Coordinates: 46°05′20″N 1°43′52″E
- Country: France
- Region: Nouvelle-Aquitaine
- Department: Creuse
- Arrondissement: Guéret
- Canton: Le Grand-Bourg
- Intercommunality: CC Bénévent-Grand-Bourg

Government
  - Mayor (2020–2026): Michel Gasnet
- Area^{1}: 12.43 km^{2} (4.80 sq mi)
- Elevation: 428 m (1,404 ft)
- Highest elevation: 522 m (1,713 ft)
- Lowest elevation: 417 m (1,368 ft)
- Population (2023): 117
  - Density: 9.41/km^{2} (24.4/sq mi)
- Time zone: UTC+01:00 (CET)
  - Summer (DST): UTC+02:00 (CEST)
- INSEE/Postal code: 23010 /23210
- ^{1} French Land Register data, which excludes lakes, ponds, glaciers > 1 km^{2} (0.386 sq mi or 247 acres) and river estuaries.

Augères (French pronunciation: [oʒɛʁ]; Occitan: Augieras) is a commune in the Creuse department in the Nouvelle-Aquitaine region in central France.

== Geography ==
A farming area comprising a small village and several hamlets, situated some 10 miles (16 km) southwest of Guéret by the banks of the Leyrenne river and at the junction of the D42 and the D22.

== Population ==
Historical population
Year	Pop.	±% p.a.
1968	254	—
1975	187	−4.28%
1982	178	−0.70%
1990	146	−2.45%
1999	146	+0.00%
2007	138	−0.70%
2012	128	−1.49%
2017	116	−1.95%
2023	117	+0.14%
Source: INSEE

== Sights ==
- The church of St.Pierre, dating from the fifteenth century.
- The chapel de Villars, from the fourteenth century.

== See also ==
- Communes of the Creuse department
