= Mourioux-Vieilleville =

Commune in Nouvelle-Aquitaine, France

- Commune
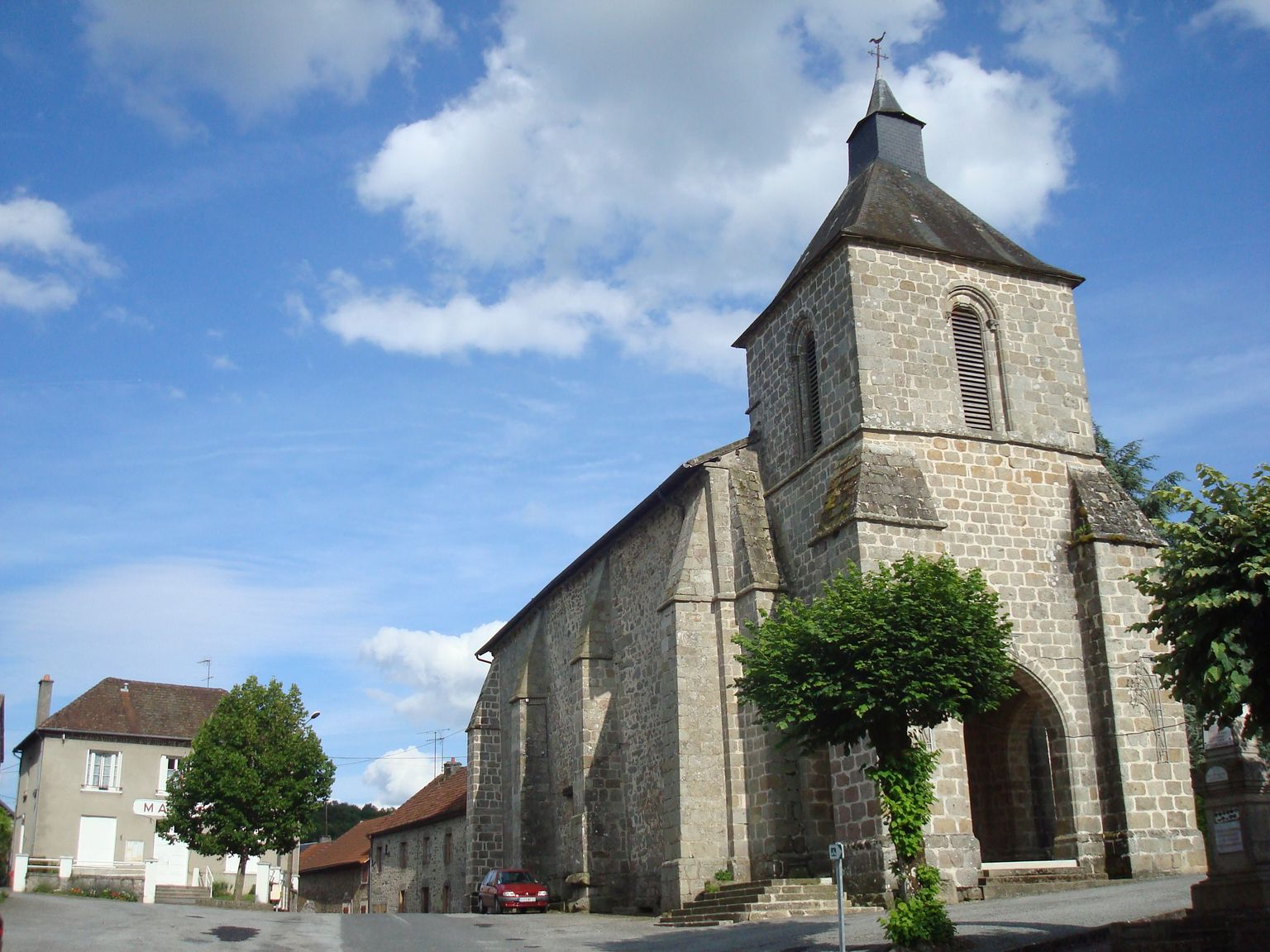
- The church and the town hall in Mourioux-Vieilleville
- Location of Mourioux-Vieilleville
- Location within France Location within Nouvelle-Aquitaine
- Coordinates: 46°04′41″N 1°38′46″E
- Country: France
- Region: Nouvelle-Aquitaine
- Department: Creuse
- Arrondissement: Guéret
- Canton: Le Grand-Bourg
- Intercommunality: CC Bénévent-Grand-Bourg

Government
  - Mayor (2020–2026): Thierry Mondon
- Area^{1}: 25.2 km^{2} (9.7 sq mi)
- Elevation: 456 m (1,496 ft)
- Highest elevation: 516 m (1,693 ft)
- Lowest elevation: 379 m (1,243 ft)
- Population (2023): 521
  - Density: 20.7/km^{2} (53.5/sq mi)
- Time zone: UTC+01:00 (CET)
  - Summer (DST): UTC+02:00 (CEST)
- INSEE/Postal code: 23137 /23210
- ^{1} French Land Register data, which excludes lakes, ponds, glaciers > 1 km^{2} (0.386 sq mi or 247 acres) and river estuaries.

Mourioux-Vieilleville (French pronunciation: [muʁju vjɛjvil]; Occitan: Moriòu Vielhavila, before 1992: Mourioux) is a commune in the Creuse department in the Nouvelle-Aquitaine region in central France.

== Geography ==
An area of lakes and streams, forestry and farming, comprising the village and a few hamlets situated some 14 miles (23 km) north of Guéret at the junction of the D5, D50, D42 and the D912a1 roads. The commune is served by a TER railway.

== Population ==
Historical population
Year	Pop.	±% p.a.
1968	941	—
1975	851	−1.43%
1982	719	−2.38%
1990	629	−1.66%
1999	569	−1.11%
2007	584	+0.33%
2012	503	−2.94%
2017	514	+0.43%
2023	521	+0.23%
Source: INSEE

== Sights ==
- The church, dating from the thirteenth century.
- A group of dolmen called "le Four des Fades".
- A fifteenth-century house known as "le Monastère".

== See also ==
- Communes of the Creuse department
