= Châtelus-le-Marcheix =

Commune in Nouvelle-Aquitaine, France

- Commune
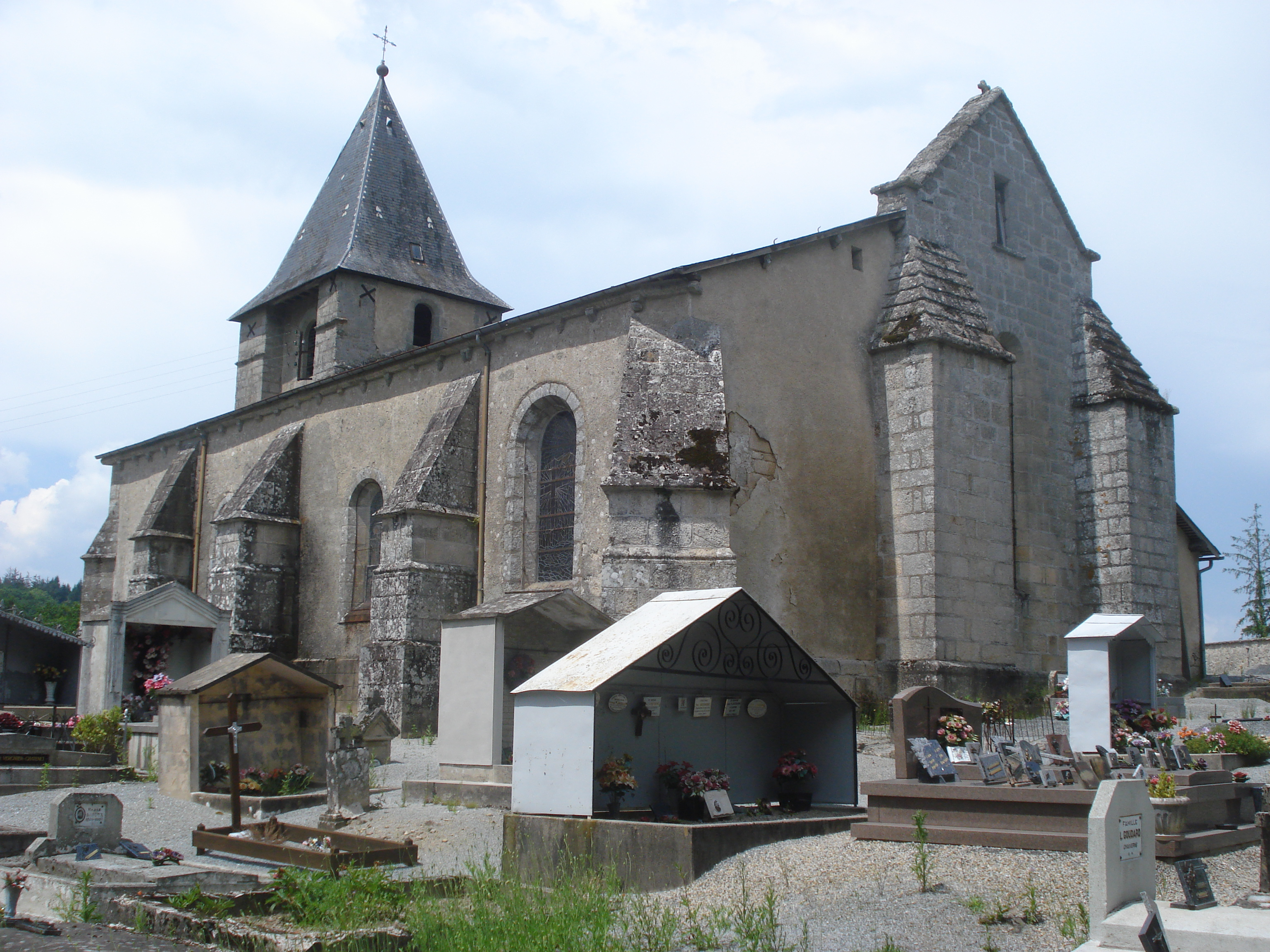
- The church in Châtelus-le-Marcheix
- Location of Châtelus-le-Marcheix
- Location within France Location within Nouvelle-Aquitaine
- Coordinates: 46°00′01″N 1°36′31″E
- Country: France
- Region: Nouvelle-Aquitaine
- Department: Creuse
- Arrondissement: Guéret
- Canton: Le Grand-Bourg
- Intercommunality: CC Bénévent-Grand-Bourg

Government
  - Mayor (2022–2026): Philippe Riot
- Area^{1}: 43.2 km^{2} (16.7 sq mi)
- Highest elevation: 650 m (2,130 ft)
- Lowest elevation: 294 m (965 ft)
- Population (2023): 336
  - Density: 7.78/km^{2} (20.1/sq mi)
- Time zone: UTC+01:00 (CET)
  - Summer (DST): UTC+02:00 (CEST)
- INSEE/Postal code: 23056 /23430
- ^{1} French Land Register data, which excludes lakes, ponds, glaciers > 1 km^{2} (0.386 sq mi or 247 acres) and river estuaries.

Châtelus-le-Marcheix (French pronunciation: [ʃatly lə maʁʃɛ]; Occitan: Chasteluç lo Marchès) is a commune in the Creuse department in the Nouvelle-Aquitaine region in central France.

== Geography ==
A village of farming, forestry, lakes and streams situated some 22 miles (35 km) southwest of Guéret by the banks of the Taurion river and at the junction of the D5, D8 and the D48 roads. The village lies on the pilgrimage path of the Way of St. James.

== Population ==
Historical population
Year	Pop.	±% p.a.
1968	647	—
1975	495	−3.75%
1982	447	−1.45%
1990	375	−2.17%
1999	356	−0.58%
2007	364	+0.28%
2012	350	−0.78%
2017	314	−2.15%
2023	336	+1.14%
Source: INSEE

== Personalities ==
- Pierre Michon, writer, was born here in 1945.

== Sights ==
- The church, dating from the fourteenth century.
- Ruins of a feudal castle.

== See also ==
- Communes of the Creuse department
