= Bénévent-et-Charbillac =

- Part of Saint-Bonnet-en-Champsaur
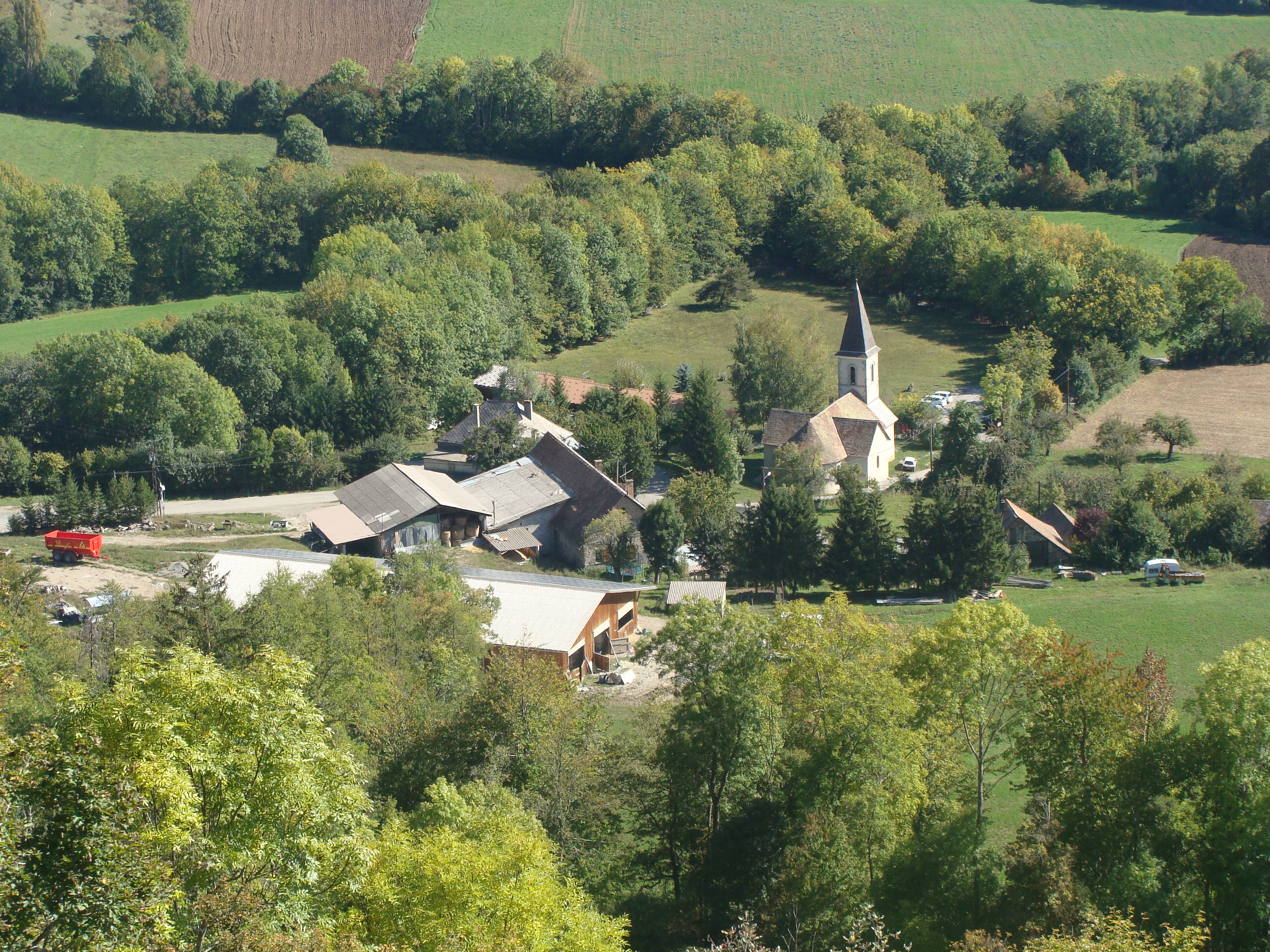

- Coat of arms
- Location of Bénévent-et-Charbillac
- Location within France Location within Provence-Alpes-Côte d'Azur
- Coordinates: 44°41′54″N 6°05′12″E
- Country: France
- Region: Provence-Alpes-Côte d'Azur
- Department: Hautes-Alpes
- Arrondissement: Gap
- Canton: Saint-Bonnet-en-Champsaur
- Commune: Saint-Bonnet-en-Champsaur
- Area^{1}: 12.15 km^{2} (4.69 sq mi)
- Elevation: 1,120 m (3,670 ft)
- Highest elevation: 2,058 m (6,752 ft)
- Lowest elevation: 923 m (3,028 ft)
- Population (2023): 293
  - Density: 24.1/km^{2} (62.5/sq mi)
- Time zone: UTC+01:00 (CET)
  - Summer (DST): UTC+02:00 (CEST)
- Postal code: 05500
- ^{1} French Land Register data, which excludes lakes, ponds, glaciers > 1 km^{2} (0.386 sq mi or 247 acres) and river estuaries.

Bénévent-et-Charbillac (Vivaro-Alpine: Benevent e Charbilhac) is a former commune in the Hautes-Alpes department in southeastern France. Since 2013, it is part of the commune Saint-Bonnet-en-Champsaur.

== See also ==
- Communes of the Hautes-Alpes department
