= Le Grand-Bourg =

Commune in Nouvelle-Aquitaine, France

- Commune
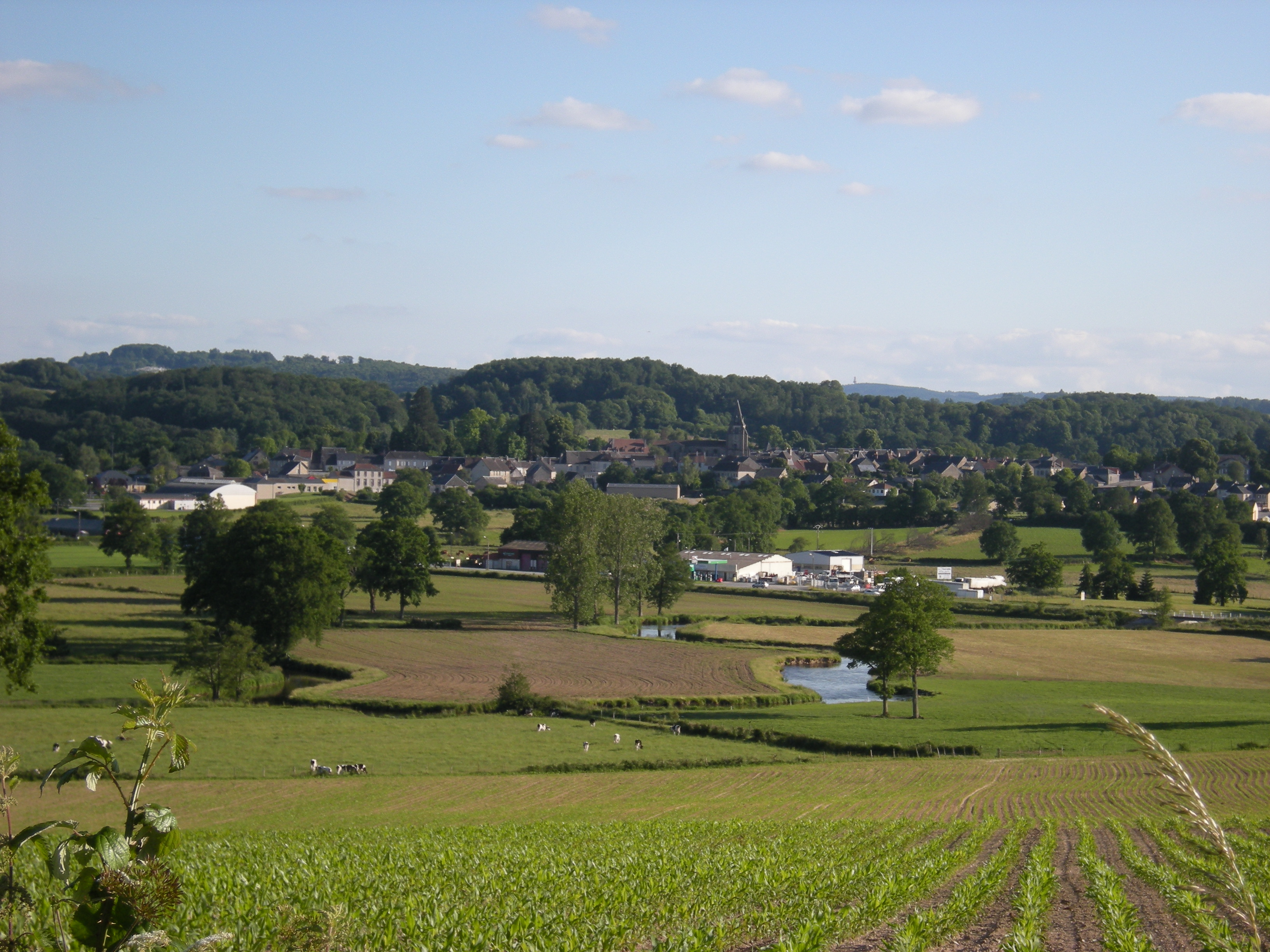
- The village of Grand-Bourg seen from the village of Ardannes, the river Gartempe is in the foreground

- Coat of arms
- Location of Le Grand-Bourg
- Location within France Location within Nouvelle-Aquitaine
- Coordinates: 46°09′39″N 1°38′43″E
- Country: France
- Region: Nouvelle-Aquitaine
- Department: Creuse
- Arrondissement: Guéret
- Canton: Le Grand-Bourg
- Intercommunality: CC Bénévent-Grand-Bourg

Government
  - Mayor (2020–2026): Francky Chatignoux
- Area^{1}: 78.91 km^{2} (30.47 sq mi)
- Elevation: 389 m (1,276 ft)
- Highest elevation: 497 m (1,631 ft)
- Lowest elevation: 344 m (1,129 ft)
- Population (2023): 1,167
  - Density: 14.79/km^{2} (38.30/sq mi)
- Time zone: UTC+01:00 (CET)
  - Summer (DST): UTC+02:00 (CEST)
- INSEE/Postal code: 23095 /23240
- ^{1} French Land Register data, which excludes lakes, ponds, glaciers > 1 km^{2} (0.386 sq mi or 247 acres) and river estuaries.

Le Grand-Bourg (French pronunciation: [lə ɡʁɑ̃ buʁ]; Limousin: Le Borg) is a commune in the Creuse department in the Nouvelle-Aquitaine region in central France.

== Geography ==
An area of farming and forestry comprising the village and a few small hamlets situated some 12 miles (19 km) west of Guéret at the junction of the D4, D52 and the D912 road, the pilgrimage route known as St James's Way. The river Gartempe flows through the middle of the commune's territory.

== Population ==
Historical population
Year	Pop.	±% p.a.
1968	1,861	—
1975	1,564	−2.45%
1982	1,369	−1.88%
1990	1,323	−0.43%
1999	1,244	−0.68%
2007	1,194	−0.51%
2012	1,217	+0.38%
2017	1,220	+0.05%
2023	1,167	−0.74%
Source: INSEE

== Sights ==
- The chateau de Collonges, dating from the eighteenth century.
- The ruins of the chateau du Seigneur.
- The eighteenth-century presbytery.
- The thirteenth-century church.
- A watermill.
- An eighteenth-century chapel.

Set on a hilltop with a 360 degree views overlooking Le Creuse countryside, sits the oldest and most historic castle in the Limousin region is Chateau Du Masgelier, originally built as a medieval defence castle in 1174 dating back to the Knights Templar and once owned by King Louis XIV, the south turret bears the crest of the Fleur De Lis.

== See also ==
- Communes of the Creuse department
