= Saint-Goussaud =

Commune in Nouvelle-Aquitaine, France

- Commune
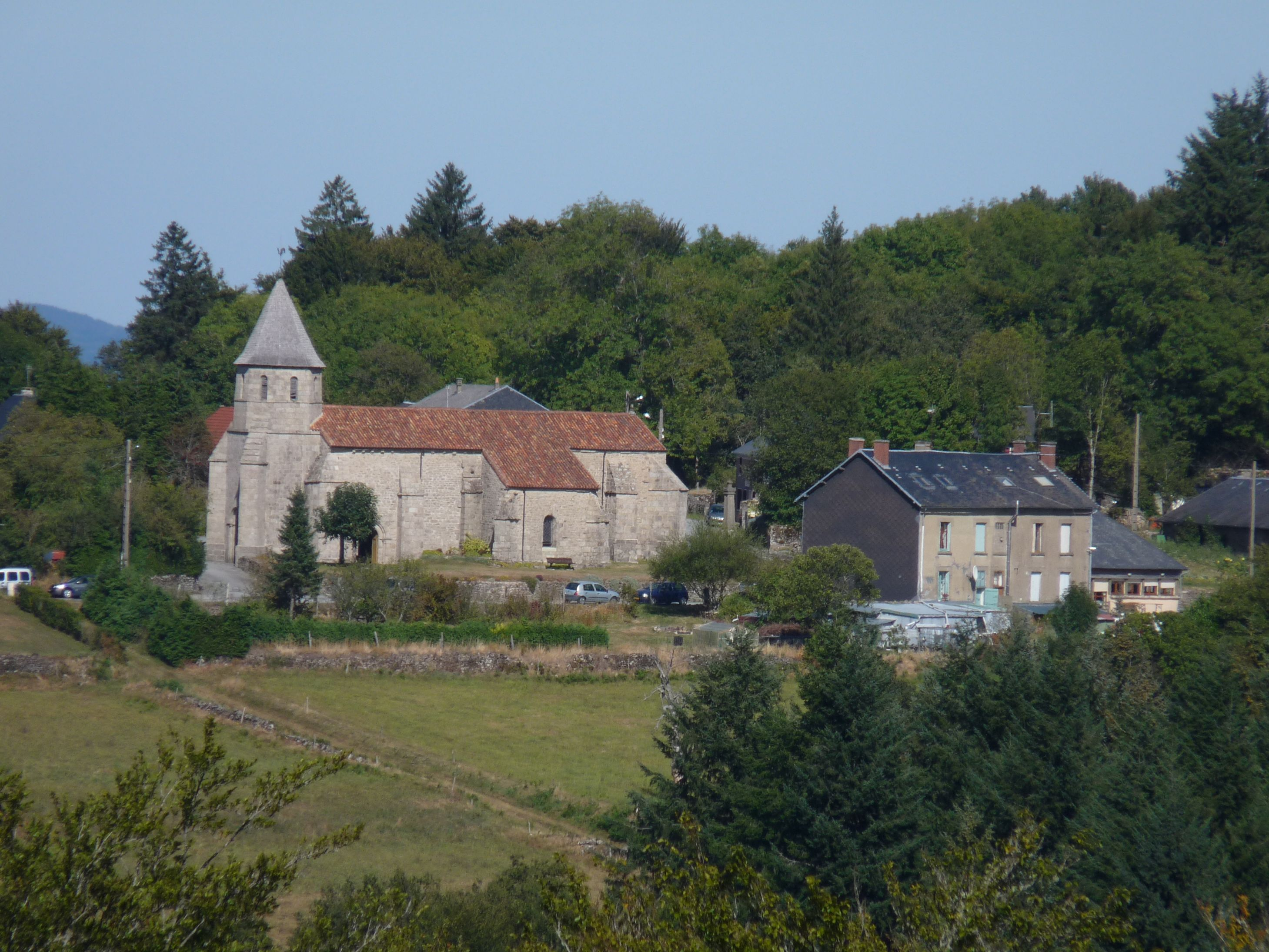
- The church and surrounding buildings in Saint-Goussaud
- Location of Saint-Goussaud
- Location within France Location within Nouvelle-Aquitaine
- Coordinates: 46°02′29″N 1°34′44″E
- Country: France
- Region: Nouvelle-Aquitaine
- Department: Creuse
- Arrondissement: Guéret
- Canton: Le Grand-Bourg
- Intercommunality: CC Bénévent-Grand-Bourg

Government
  - Mayor (2020–2026): Sophie Simon
- Area^{1}: 24.3 km^{2} (9.4 sq mi)
- Elevation: 672 m (2,205 ft)
- Highest elevation: 693 m (2,274 ft)
- Lowest elevation: 377 m (1,237 ft)
- Population (2023): 157
  - Density: 6.46/km^{2} (16.7/sq mi)
- Time zone: UTC+01:00 (CET)
  - Summer (DST): UTC+02:00 (CEST)
- INSEE/Postal code: 23200 /23430
- ^{1} French Land Register data, which excludes lakes, ponds, glaciers > 1 km^{2} (0.386 sq mi or 247 acres) and river estuaries.

Saint-Goussaud (French pronunciation: [sɛ̃ ɡuso]; Occitan: Sent Gossaud) is a commune in the Creuse department in central France.

== Population ==
Historical population
Year	Pop.	±% p.a.
1968	353	—
1975	285	−3.01%
1982	271	−0.72%
1990	238	−1.61%
1999	213	−1.23%
2007	209	−0.24%
2012	192	−1.68%
2017	162	−3.34%
2023	157	−0.52%
Source: INSEE

== See also ==
- Communes of the Creuse department
