= Ceyroux =

Commune in Nouvelle-Aquitaine, France

- Commune
- Location of Ceyroux
- Location within France Location within Nouvelle-Aquitaine
- Coordinates: 46°04′19″N 1°40′00″E
- Country: France
- Region: Nouvelle-Aquitaine
- Department: Creuse
- Arrondissement: Guéret
- Canton: Le Grand-Bourg
- Intercommunality: CC Bénévent-Grand-Bourg

Government
  - Mayor (2020–2026): Ludovic Daguet
- Area^{1}: 12.13 km^{2} (4.68 sq mi)
- Elevation: 426 m (1,398 ft)
- Highest elevation: 516 m (1,693 ft)
- Lowest elevation: 397 m (1,302 ft)
- Population (2023): 121
  - Density: 9.98/km^{2} (25.8/sq mi)
- Time zone: UTC+01:00 (CET)
  - Summer (DST): UTC+02:00 (CEST)
- INSEE/Postal code: 23042 /23210
- ^{1} French Land Register data, which excludes lakes, ponds, glaciers > 1 km^{2} (0.386 sq mi or 247 acres) and river estuaries.

Ceyroux (French pronunciation: [sɛʁu]; Occitan: Ceirom) is a commune in the Creuse department in the Nouvelle-Aquitaine region in central France.

== Geography ==
An area of farming and forestry comprising the village and several hamlets situated some 15 miles (24 km) southwest of Guéret, at the junction of the D50 and the D44.

== Population ==
Historical population
Year	Pop.	±% p.a.
1968	266	—
1975	203	−3.79%
1982	181	−1.63%
1990	135	−3.60%
1999	107	−2.55%
2007	123	+1.76%
2012	128	+0.80%
2017	127	−0.16%
2023	121	−0.80%
Source: INSEE

== Sights ==
- The church of St. Blaise, dating from the twelfth century.

== See also ==
- Communes of the Creuse department
