= Aulon, Creuse =

Commune in Nouvelle-Aquitaine, France

Aulon
- Commune
- Coat of arms
- Location of Aulon
- Location within France Location within Nouvelle-Aquitaine
- Coordinates: 46°04′59″N 1°41′29″E
- Country: France
- Region: Nouvelle-Aquitaine
- Department: Creuse
- Arrondissement: Guéret
- Canton: Le Grand-Bourg
- Intercommunality: CC Bénévent-Grand-Bourg

Government
  - Mayor (2020–2026): Josette Moreau
- Area^{1}: 10.86 km^{2} (4.19 sq mi)
- Elevation: 413 m (1,355 ft)
- Highest elevation: 535 m (1,755 ft)
- Lowest elevation: 407 m (1,335 ft)
- Population (2023): 163
  - Density: 15.0/km^{2} (38.9/sq mi)
- Time zone: UTC+01:00 (CET)
  - Summer (DST): UTC+02:00 (CEST)
- INSEE/Postal code: 23011 /23210
- ^{1} French Land Register data, which excludes lakes, ponds, glaciers > 1 km^{2} (0.386 sq mi or 247 acres) and river estuaries.

Aulon (French pronunciation: [olɔ̃]) is a commune in the Creuse department in the Nouvelle-Aquitaine region in central France.

== Geography ==
An area of farming, forests and lakes comprising a small village and a couple of hamlets, situated some 10 miles (16 km) southwest of Guéret at the junction of the D42, D912 and the D10.

== Population ==
Historical population
Year	Pop.	±% p.a.
1968	256	—
1975	218	−2.27%
1982	209	−0.60%
1990	191	−1.12%
1999	176	−0.90%
2007	174	−0.14%
2012	159	−1.79%
2017	154	−0.64%
2023	163	+0.95%
Source: INSEE

== Sights ==
- The church, dating from the fifteenth century.

== See also ==
- Communes of the Creuse department
