= Communauté de communes de Bénévent-Grand-Bourg =

Coordinates: 46.1592°N 1.6448°E

Bénévent-Grand-Bourg
- Communauté de communes
- Interactive map of Bénévent-Grand-Bourg
- Country: France
- Region: Nouvelle-Aquitaine
- Department: Creuse
- No. of communes: {{{nbcomm}}}
- Established: July 2000
- Area: 389.4 km^{2} (150.3 sq mi)
- Population (2018): 6,924
  - Density: 17.78/km^{2} (46.05/sq mi)

The communauté de communes de Bénévent-Grand-Bourg was created on 13 July 2000 and is located in the Creuse département of the Nouvelle-Aquitaine region, in central France. It was merged into the new Communauté de communes Monts et Vallées Ouest Creuse in January 2017, but this merger was revoked and the former communautés de communes were recreated on 31 December 2019. Its seat is Le Grand-Bourg. Its area is 389.4 km^{2}. Its population was 6,924 in 2018.

It comprises the following 16 communes:

- Arrènes
- Augères
- Aulon
- Azat-Châtenet
- Bénévent-l'Abbaye
- Ceyroux
- Chamborand
- Châtelus-le-Marcheix
- Fleurat
- Fursac
- Le Grand-Bourg
- Lizières
- Marsac
- Mourioux-Vieilleville
- Saint-Goussaud
- Saint-Priest-la-Plaine

== See also ==
- Communes of the Creuse department
