= Marsac, Creuse =

Commune in Nouvelle-Aquitaine, France

Marsac
- Commune
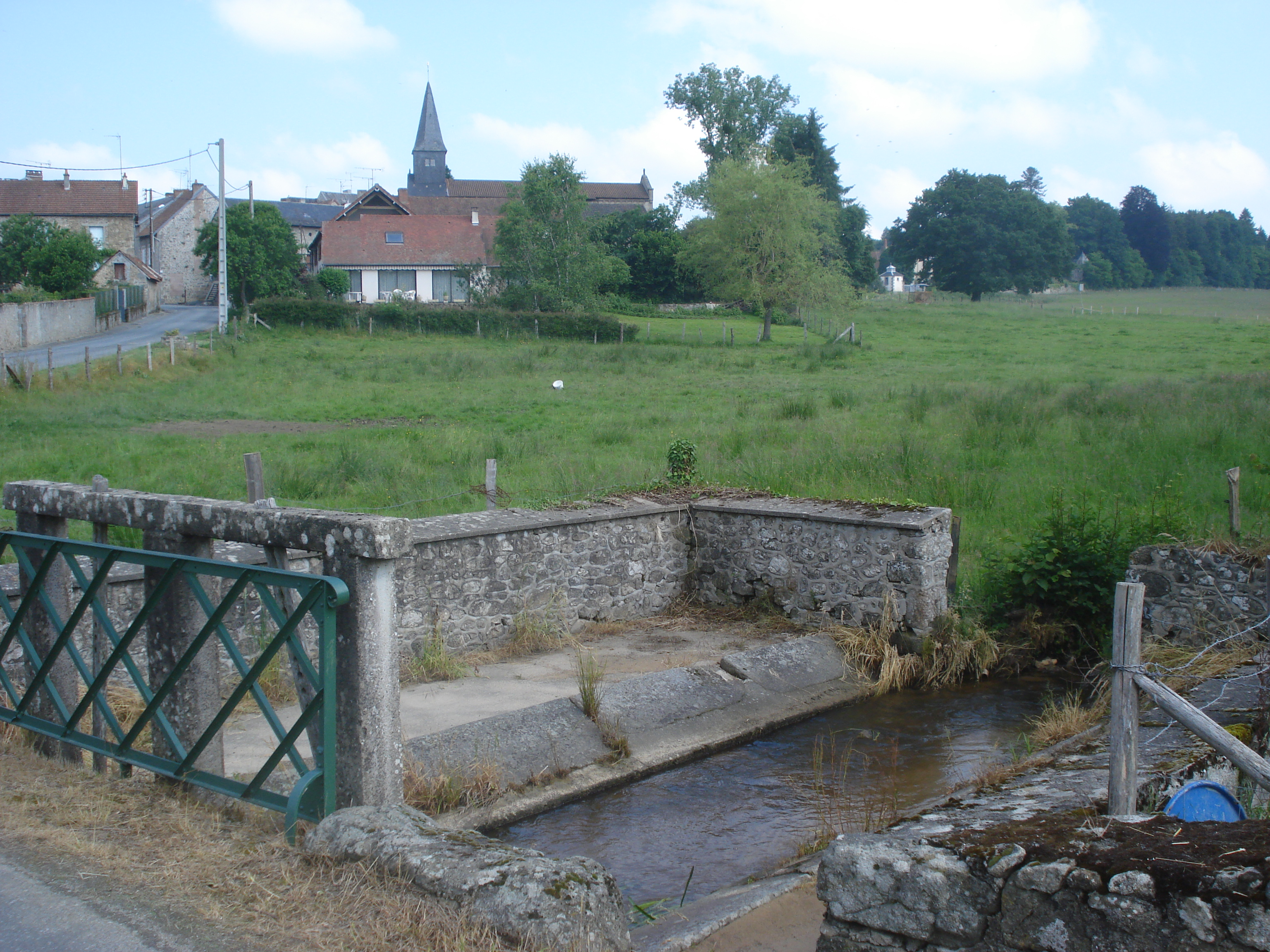
- A view of Marsac with the Ardour river in the foreground
- Location of Marsac
- Location within France Location within Nouvelle-Aquitaine
- Coordinates: 46°05′55″N 1°35′26″E
- Country: France
- Region: Nouvelle-Aquitaine
- Department: Creuse
- Arrondissement: Guéret
- Canton: Le Grand-Bourg
- Intercommunality: CC Bénévent-Grand-Bourg

Government
  - Mayor (2020–2026): Daniel Dumas
- Area^{1}: 19.67 km^{2} (7.59 sq mi)
- Highest elevation: 470 m (1,540 ft)
- Lowest elevation: 348 m (1,142 ft)
- Population (2023): 643
  - Density: 32.7/km^{2} (84.7/sq mi)
- Time zone: UTC+01:00 (CET)
  - Summer (DST): UTC+02:00 (CEST)
- INSEE/Postal code: 23124 /23210
- ^{1} French Land Register data, which excludes lakes, ponds, glaciers > 1 km^{2} (0.386 sq mi or 247 acres) and river estuaries.

Marsac (French pronunciation: [maʁsak]; Occitan: Marçac) is a commune in the Creuse department in the Nouvelle-Aquitaine region in central France.

== Geography ==
An area of lakes, streams and farming comprising the village and several hamlets situated in the valley of the little river Ardour, some 15 miles (24 km) southwest of Guéret at the junction of the D42, D914 and the D57 roads. The commune is served by a TER railway.

== Population ==
Historical population
Year	Pop.	±% p.a.
1968	854	—
1975	857	+0.05%
1982	766	−1.59%
1990	781	+0.24%
1999	727	−0.79%
2007	721	−0.10%
2012	678	−1.22%
2017	676	−0.06%
2023	643	−0.83%
Source: INSEE

== Sights ==
- The church of St. Pierre, dating from the thirteenth century.
- The ruins of a fifteenth-century castle.
- Two dolmens.
- Three old public washhouses.
- The chapel des Rorgues

== See also ==
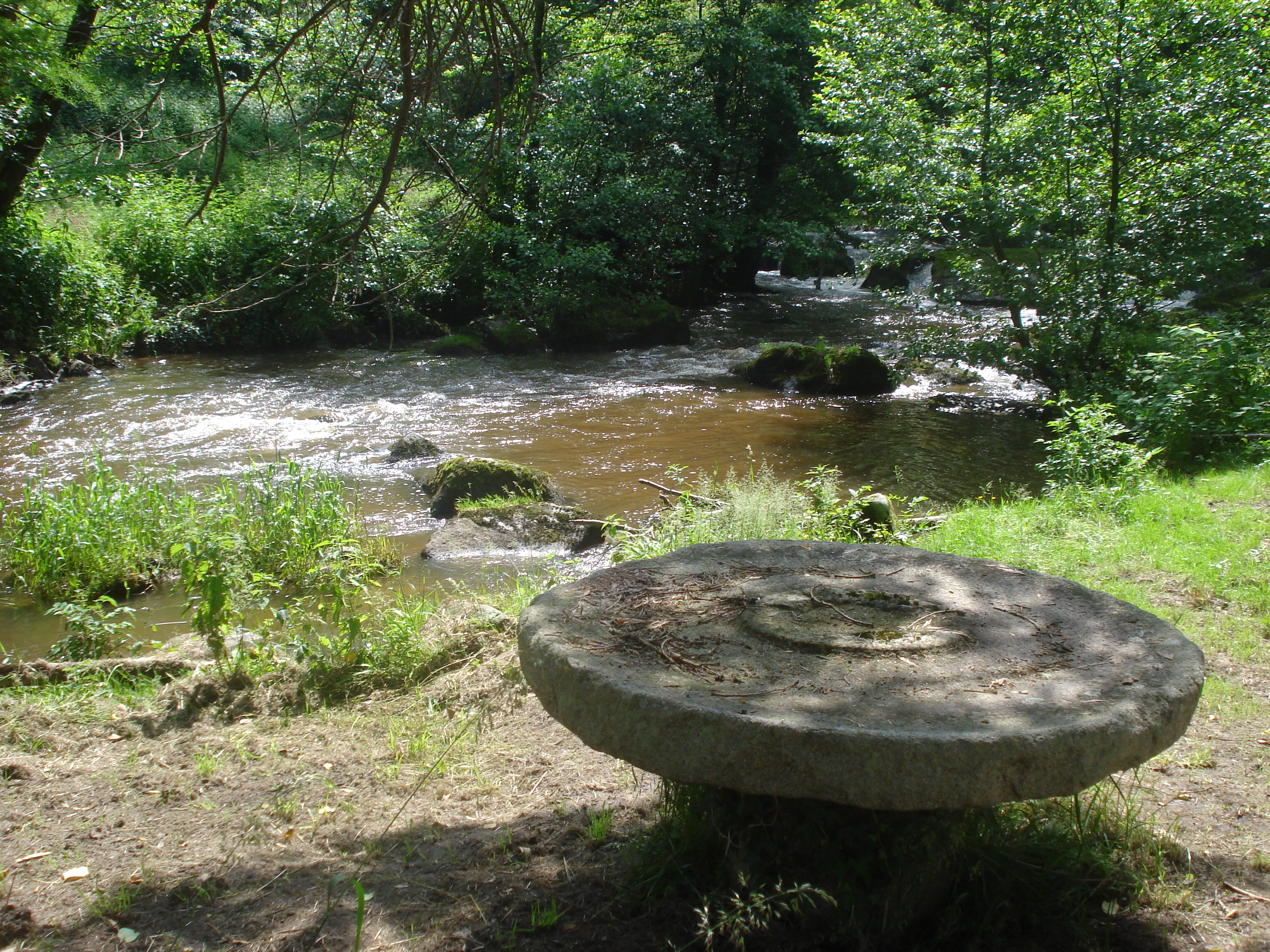
The Ardour at Marsac

- Communes of the Creuse department
