= Canton of Le Grand-Bourg =

Coordinates: 46°10′47″N 1°35′23″E

Le Grand-Bourg
- Canton
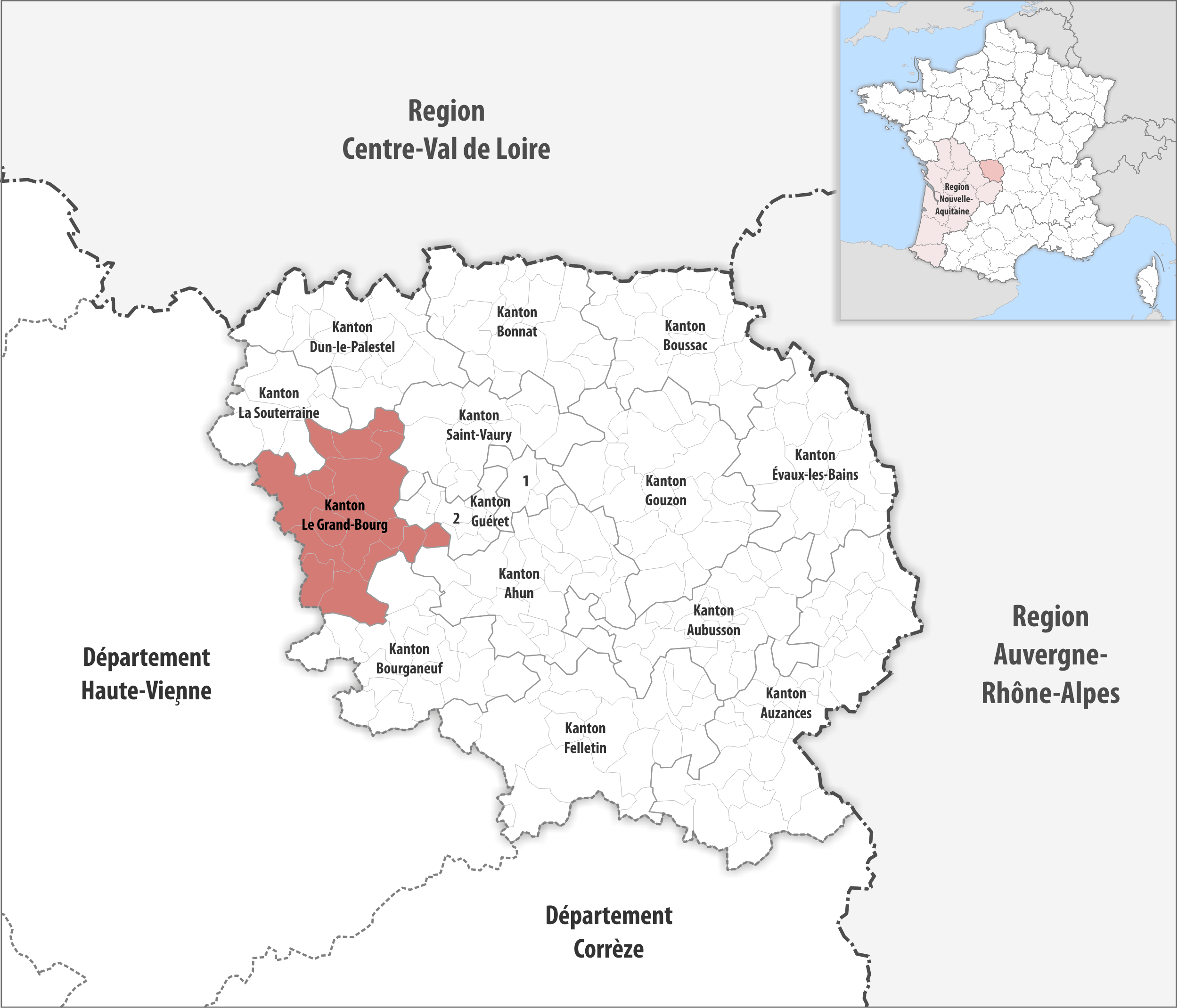
- Country: France
- Region: Nouvelle-Aquitaine
- Department: Creuse
- No. of communes: {{{nbcomm}}}
- Area: 389.41 km^{2} (150.35 sq mi)
- Population (2023): 6,778
  - Density: 17.41/km^{2} (45.08/sq mi)
- INSEE code: 23 11

The Canton of Le Grand-Bourg is a canton situated in the Creuse département and in the Nouvelle-Aquitaine region of central France.

== Geography ==
An area of farming and forestry in the arrondissement of Guéret, centred on the town of Le Grand-Bourg. The altitude varies from 315m (Saint-Pierre-de-Fursac) to 539m (Fleurat) with an average altitude of 389m.

== Population ==
Historical population
Year	Pop.	±% p.a.
2013	7,141	—
2018	6,924	−0.62%
Source: INSEE

== Composition ==
At the French canton reorganisation which came into effect in March 2015, the canton was expanded from 7 to 17 communes (2 of which merged into the new commune Fursac):

- Arrènes
- Augères
- Aulon
- Azat-Châtenet
- Bénévent-l'Abbaye
- Ceyroux
- Chamborand
- Châtelus-le-Marcheix
- Fleurat
- Fursac
- Le Grand-Bourg
- Lizières
- Marsac
- Mourioux-Vieilleville
- Saint-Goussaud
- Saint-Priest-la-Plaine

== See also ==
- Arrondissements of the Creuse department
- Cantons of the Creuse department
- Communes of the Creuse department
