= Bénévent-l'Abbaye =

Commune in Nouvelle-Aquitaine, France

Bénévent-l’Abbaye
- Commune
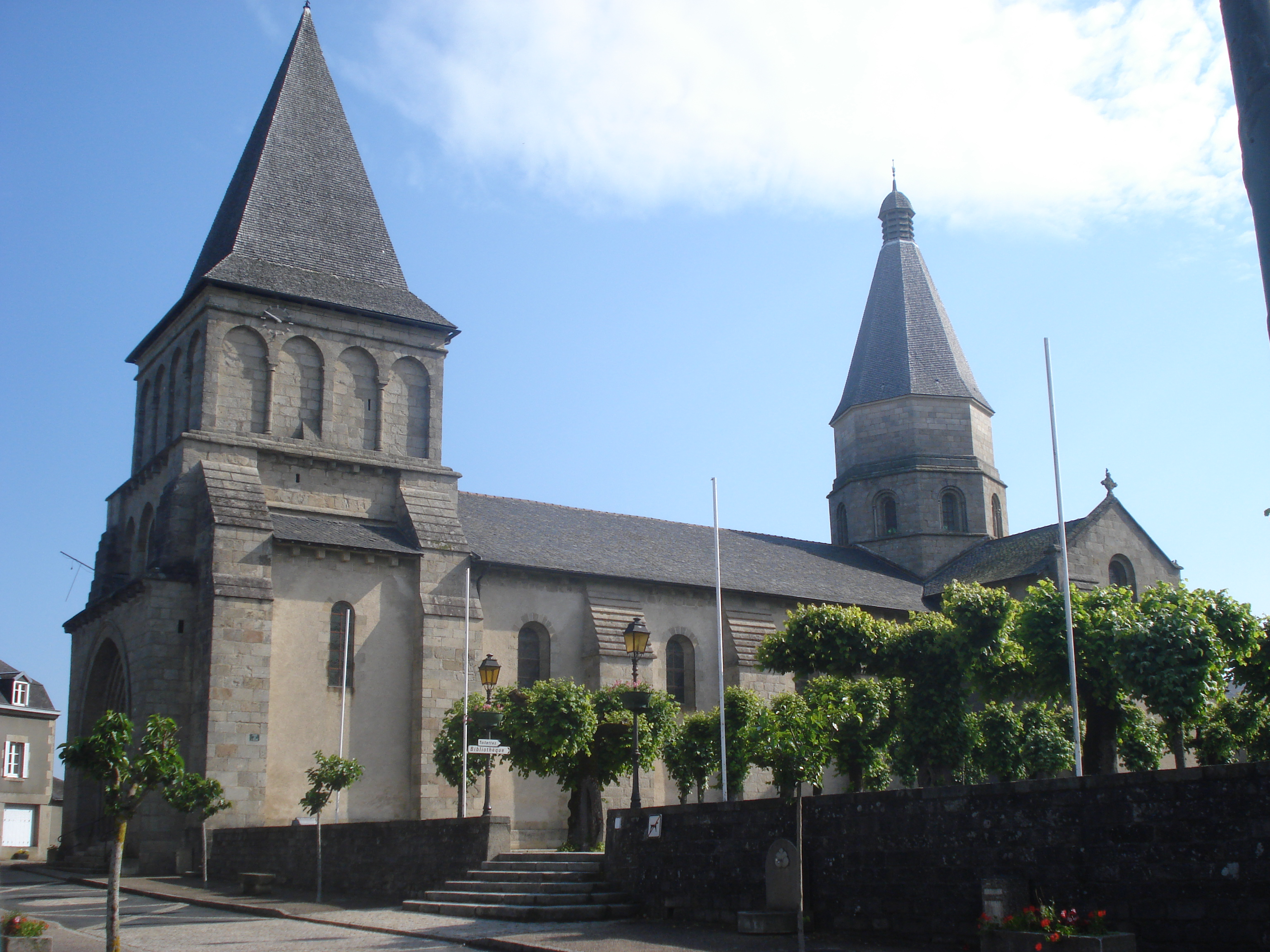
- The church in Bénévent-l'Abbaye

- Coat of arms
- Location of Bénévent-l’Abbaye
- Location within France Location within Nouvelle-Aquitaine
- Coordinates: 46°07′07″N 1°37′47″E
- Country: France
- Region: Nouvelle-Aquitaine
- Department: Creuse
- Arrondissement: Guéret
- Canton: Le Grand-Bourg
- Intercommunality: CC Bénévent-Grand-Bourg

Government
  - Mayor (2020–2026): André Mavigner
- Area^{1}: 11.56 km^{2} (4.46 sq mi)
- Highest elevation: 545 m (1,788 ft)
- Lowest elevation: 402 m (1,319 ft)
- Population (2023): 769
  - Density: 66.5/km^{2} (172/sq mi)
- Time zone: UTC+01:00 (CET)
  - Summer (DST): UTC+02:00 (CEST)
- INSEE/Postal code: 23021 /23210
- ^{1} French Land Register data, which excludes lakes, ponds, glaciers > 1 km^{2} (0.386 sq mi or 247 acres) and river estuaries.

Bénévent-l’Abbaye (French pronunciation: [benevɑ̃ labei]; Occitan: Benavent l'Abadia) is a commune in the Creuse department in the Nouvelle-Aquitaine region in central France.

== Geography ==
An area of farming, forestry and associated light industry comprising the village and several hamlets, situated some 15 miles (24 km) west of Guéret, at the junction of the D912a1, D10, D62 and the D914 roads. The town is on the Way of St. James pilgrimage route.

== Population ==
Historical population
Year	Pop.	±% p.a.
1968	1,074	—
1975	1,106	+0.42%
1982	1,023	−1.11%
1990	837	−2.48%
1999	824	−0.17%
2007	855	+0.46%
2012	838	−0.40%
2017	776	−1.53%
2023	769	−0.15%
Source: INSEE

== Sights ==
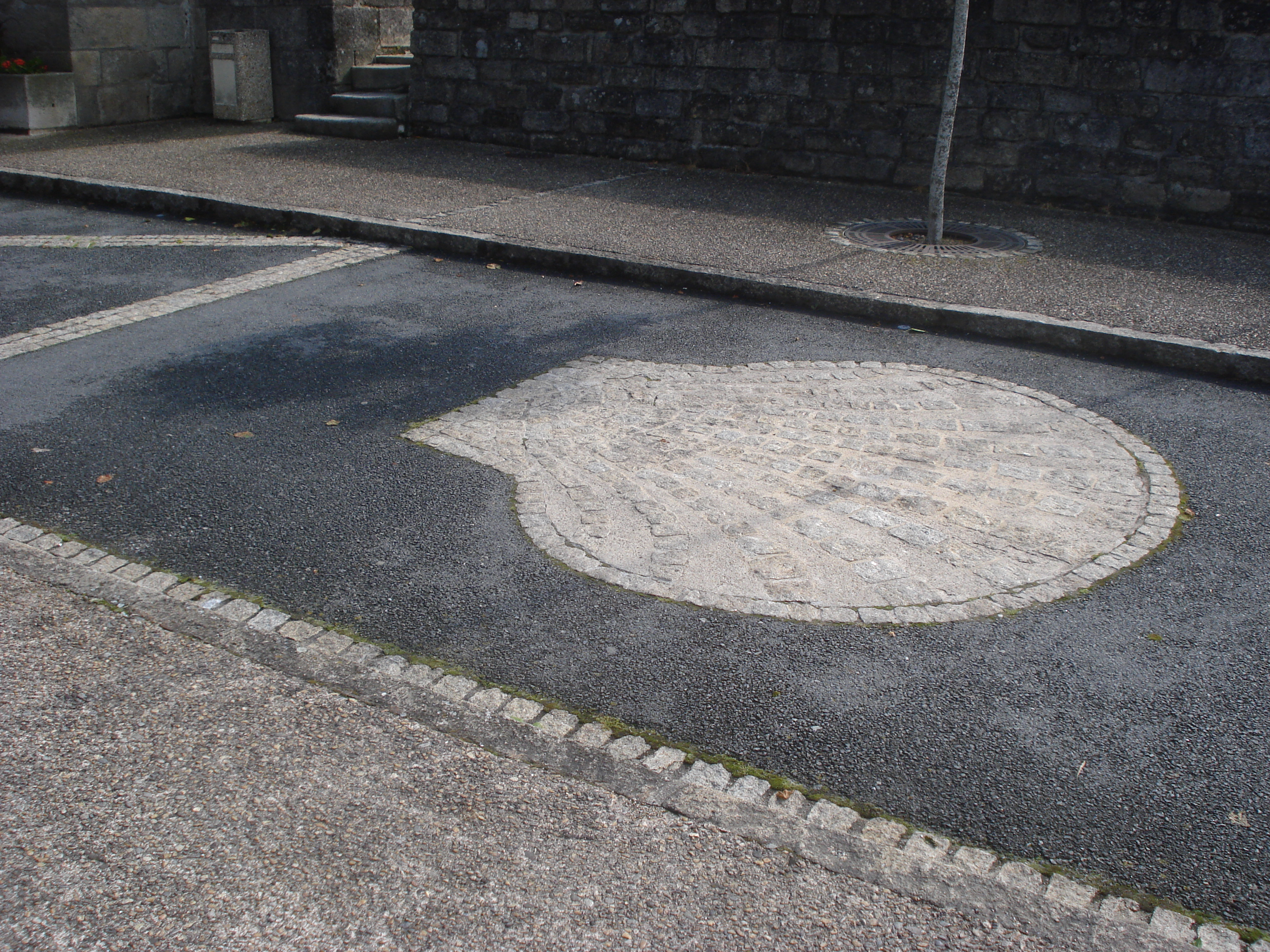
The pilgrims’ way – marked by a shell

- The abbey church of St. Barthélémy, dating from the twelfth century.

== See also ==
- Communes of the Creuse department
