= Chambon (disambiguation) =

A chambon is a training device used on horses.

Chambon may also refer to:

== Places ==
- Chambon, Charente-Maritime, in the Charente-Maritime département
- Chambon, Cher, in the Cher département
- Chambon, Gard, in the Gard département
- Chambon, Indre-et-Loire, in the Indre-et-Loire département
- Chambon-la-Forêt, in the Loiret département
- Chambon-le-Château, in the Lozère département
- Chambon-Sainte-Croix, in the Creuse département
- Chambon-sur-Cisse, in the Loir-et-Cher département
- Chambon-sur-Dolore, in the Puy-de-Dôme département
- Chambon-sur-Lac, in the Puy-de-Dôme département
- Chambon-sur-Voueize, in the Creuse département
- Le Chambon, Ardèche, in the Ardèche département
- Le Chambon-Feugerolles, in the Loire département
- Le Chambon-sur-Lignon, in the Haute-Loire département

== Lakes ==
- Lac de Chambon, artificial lake in the Indre département
- Lac Chambon, volcanic lake in the Puy-de-Dôme département
- Lac du Chambon, artificial lake in the Isère département

== People with the surname ==
- Emile Chambon (1905–1993), Swiss painter
- Nicolas Chambon (1748–1826), French politician, Mayor of Paris from 1792 to 1793
- Pierre Chambon (1931–2026), French molecular biologist and geneticist
- Marie Martha Chambon, French Roman Catholic nun
