= Crozant =

Commune in Nouvelle-Aquitaine, France

- Commune
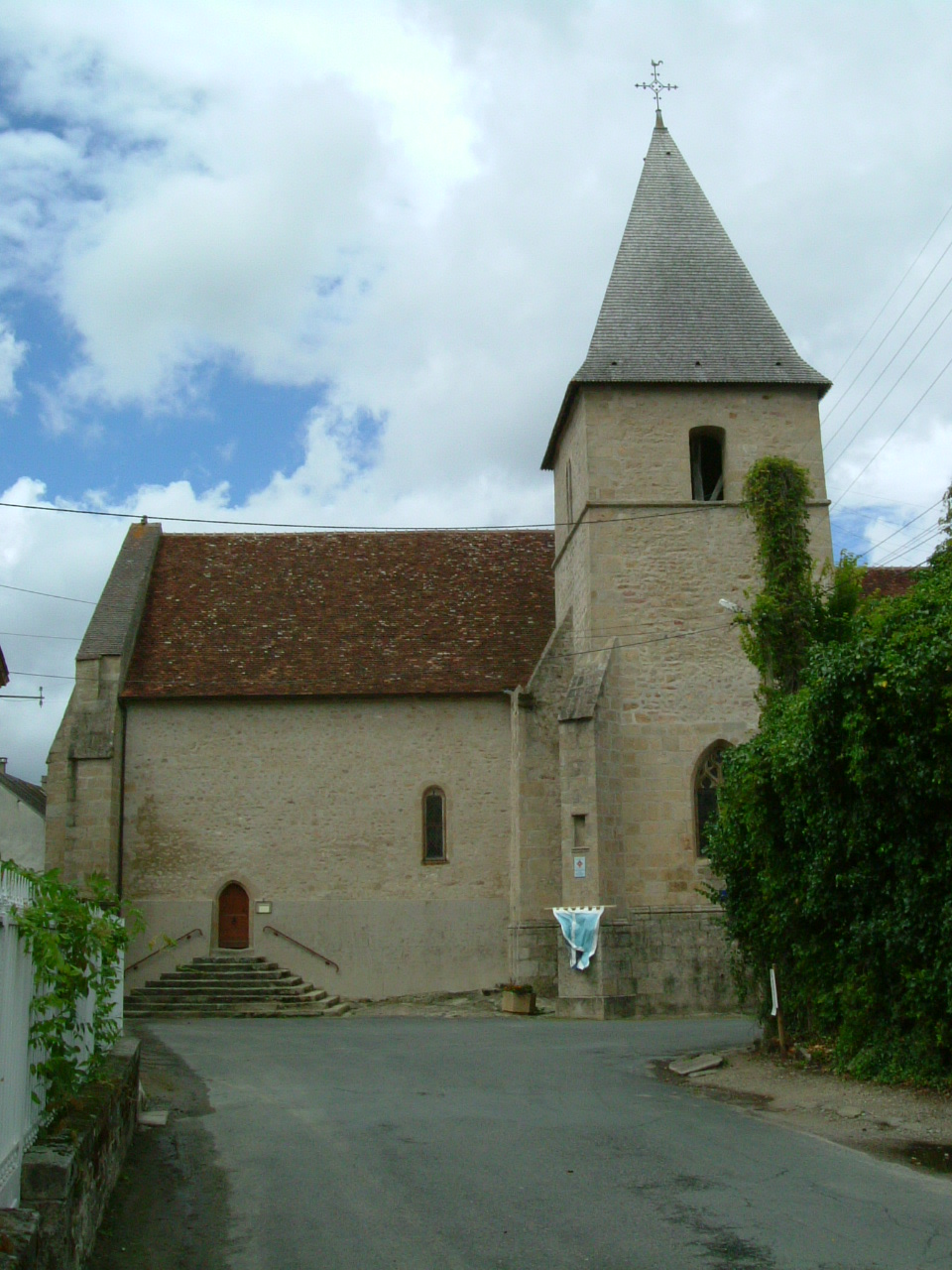
- The church in Crozant
- Location of Crozant
- Location within France Location within Nouvelle-Aquitaine
- Coordinates: 46°23′33″N 1°37′20″E
- Country: France
- Region: Nouvelle-Aquitaine
- Department: Creuse
- Arrondissement: Guéret
- Canton: Dun-le-Palestel
- Intercommunality: CC Pays Dunois

Government
  - Mayor (2020–2026): Didier Lavaud
- Area^{1}: 31.9 km^{2} (12.3 sq mi)
- Elevation: 277 m (909 ft)
- Population (2023): 431
  - Density: 13.5/km^{2} (35.0/sq mi)
- Time zone: UTC+01:00 (CET)
  - Summer (DST): UTC+02:00 (CEST)
- INSEE/Postal code: 23070 /23160
- ^{1} French Land Register data, which excludes lakes, ponds, glaciers > 1 km^{2} (0.386 sq mi or 247 acres) and river estuaries.

Crozant (French pronunciation: [kʁozɑ̃]; Limousin: Crosenc) is a commune in the Creuse department in the Nouvelle-Aquitaine region in France.

== Geography ==
A tourism and farming village situated some 20 miles (32 km) northeast of Guéret, on the D72 and by the banks of the river Creuse, the boundary with the department of Indre.

This administrative boundary is very old. It approximates to the linguistic boundary between the langue d'oïl and langue d'oc.

It also has a geological significance: to the south, the granite foothills of the Massif central, while in the plains to the north begins the limestone of the Paris basin.
When the Eguzon dam on the Creuse was built in 1926, the landscape, society and the local economy changed under the water’s influence in just a few years. One has only to see old postcards and the works of Armand Guillaumin, who painted about 140 landscapes, to notice the difference. The moors were maintained by the extensive grazing of sheep and goats, which slowly declined between the two wars and died out completely after 1950. The trend nowadays is the restoration of surrounding ruins, and the forestation of those former natural open spaces.

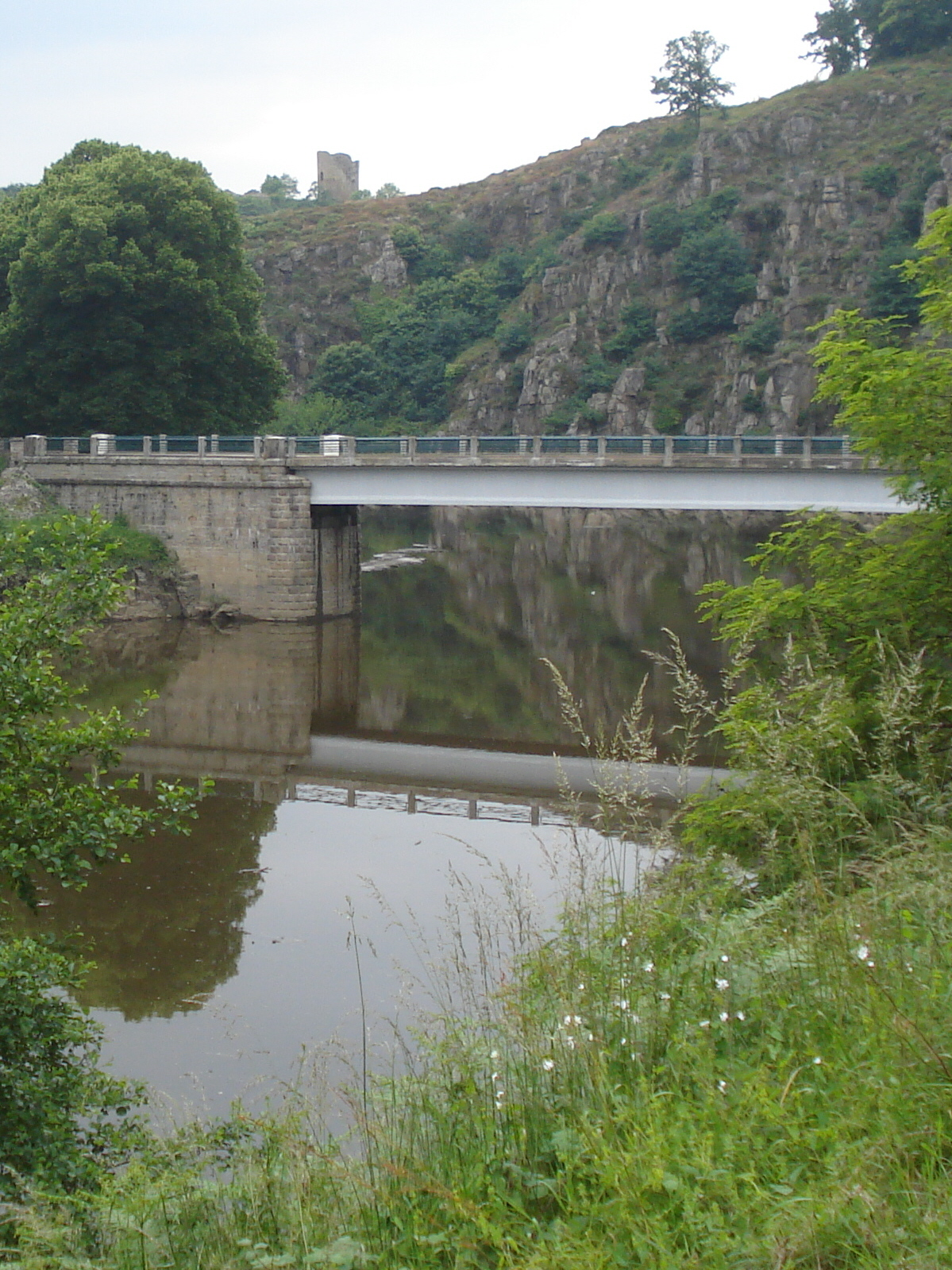
Creuse river

== Population ==
Historical population
Year	Pop.	±% p.a.
1968	929	—
1975	862	−1.06%
1982	732	−2.31%
1990	636	−1.74%
1999	581	−1.00%
2007	519	−1.40%
2012	487	−1.26%
2017	447	−1.70%
2023	431	−0.61%
Source: INSEE

== History ==
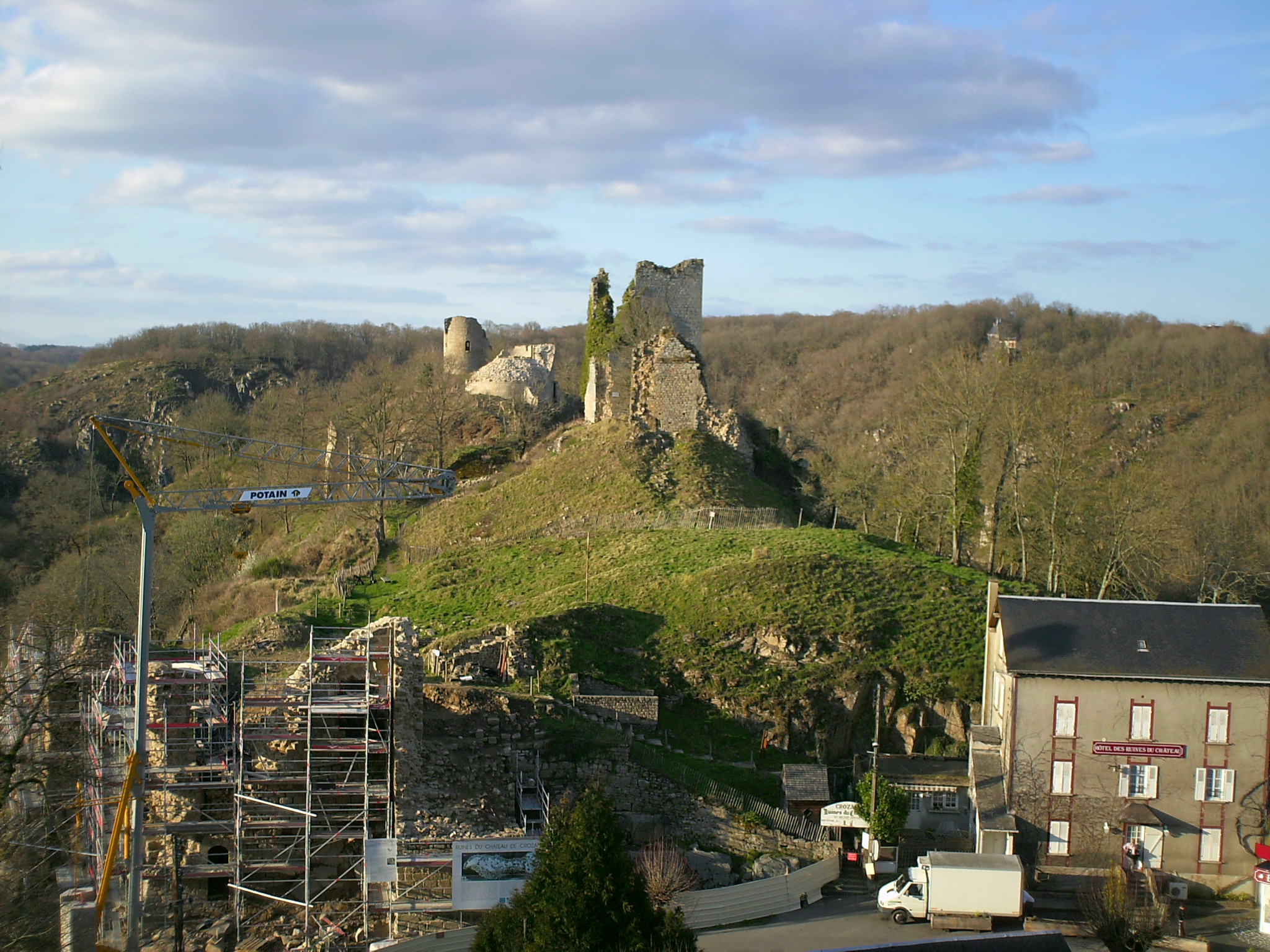
Ruins of the château

The name of Crozant is probably derived from Celtic then the Latin "Croso" (which also gives us "Creuse"). Successively known as Crozenc in 1208, Crozent in 1277, Crousant (1512) and the modern form "Crozant".
The rocky outcrop between the Creuse and its tributary, the Sédelle has been occupied since prehistoric times. A fortress appears to have been built between 997 and 1018. But it was in the 13th century that the castle we know today was built. One of the remaining towers bears the name of Isabella of Angoulême, widow of King John I of England, subsequently the wife of Hugues X de Lusignan.
In his book on the history of the region (La Marche), Joullietton reported that the castle at Crozant was taken by Catholics in 1588, which ruined one of the towers. From 1606, the castle served as a source of building material for the local people. Notes prepared in 1640, by the king’s inspector at Moulins, Voyer d'Argenson, noted that the castle was in a sad state. The remains of the stronghold, which had belonged to the Crown since the confiscation of all the property of Charles III, Duke of Bourbon, Constable of France in 1527, was then acquired by Gabriel Beaupré, governor of La Marche.
The ruins of the citadel cover a large part of the spur, with several successive ramparts, a square 15th-century donjon and two 13th-century towers plus a chapel and a "tour de l’eau’’ from where water could be raised from the river whilst covered and safe from attack.
At the end of lengthy negotiations led by the mayor of Crozant, the ruins were acquired a few years ago by the commune. A major reconstruction programme was undertaken, with funding from the state, regional and local councils, resulting in the reopening of the site to the public (€2 adults - €1.50 concessions (2008)).

From the nineteenth century, the area around Crozant inspired many painters. Perhaps the first was Paul Castans (1823–1892), who inspired Armand Guillaumin (1841–1927), to choose Crozant as his residence of choice. They give birth to the Crozant School (in French, L'Ecole de Crozant), for all those who found inspiration by the shores of the Creuse. Among them were: Pierre Ernest Ballue (1855-1928), Ernst Josephson (1851–1906), Alfred Smith (1854 - 1932), Fernand Maillaud (1862–1948), Paul Madeline (1863-1920), Clémentine Ballot (1880–1924), the Leloir dynasty (particularly Maurice Leloir (1853–1940)), the Swede, Walter Oetten (1897–1972), Solange Christauflour (1900–1953), Ernest Victor Hareux and so on. Not far from the church there is a bronze bust of Guillaumin. In 1926, the demand for electricity generation led to the creation of the Eguzon dam. This created a new tourist attraction known as Lake Chambon after the hamlet bordering Éguzon. The painters’ landscapes now included the lake, which also has boats for hire and dinner cruises around it.

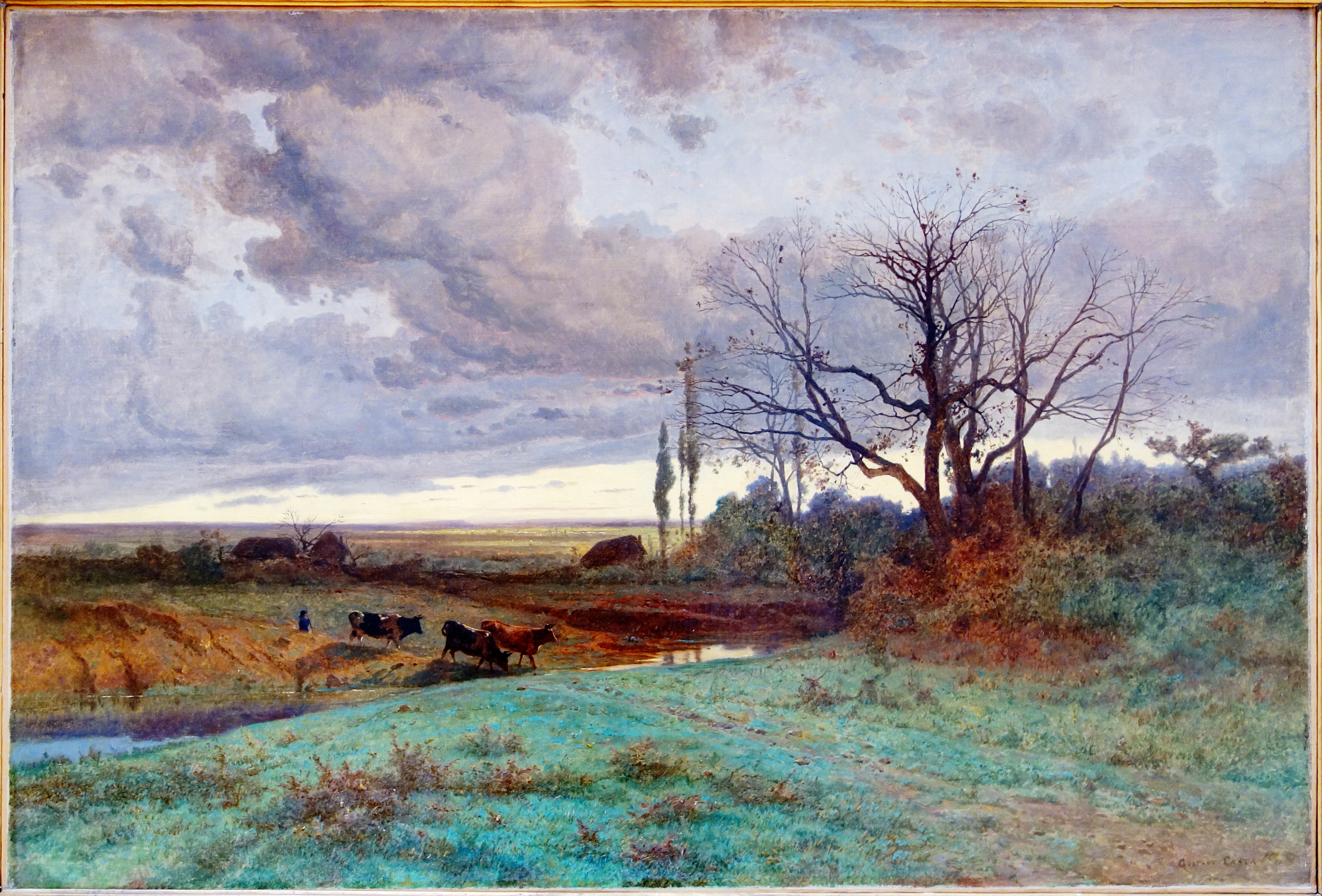
Soirée d'octobre, by Gustave Eugène Castan (1864).

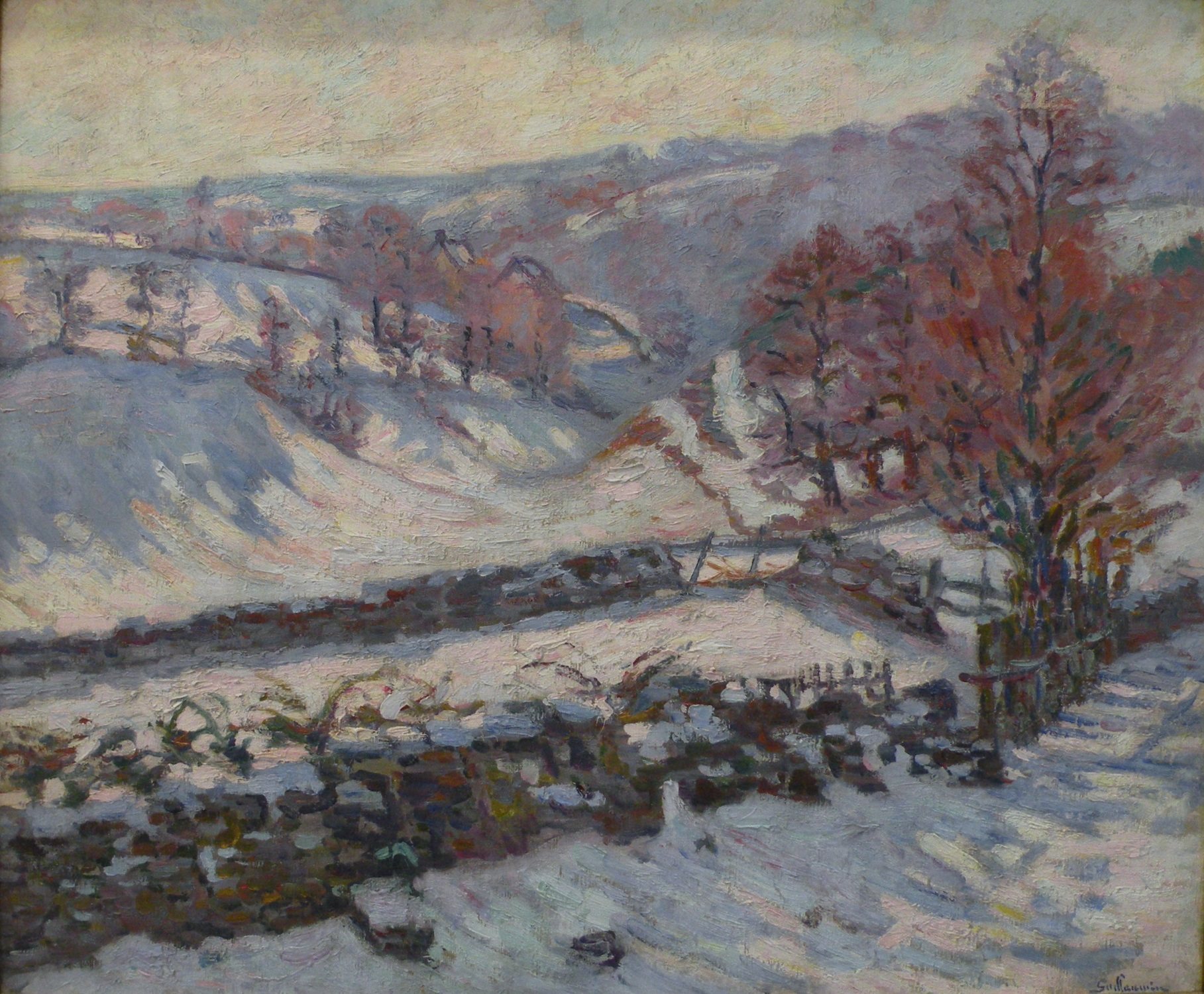
Paysage de neige à Crozant (Snow at Crozant), by Armand Guillaumin (1895).

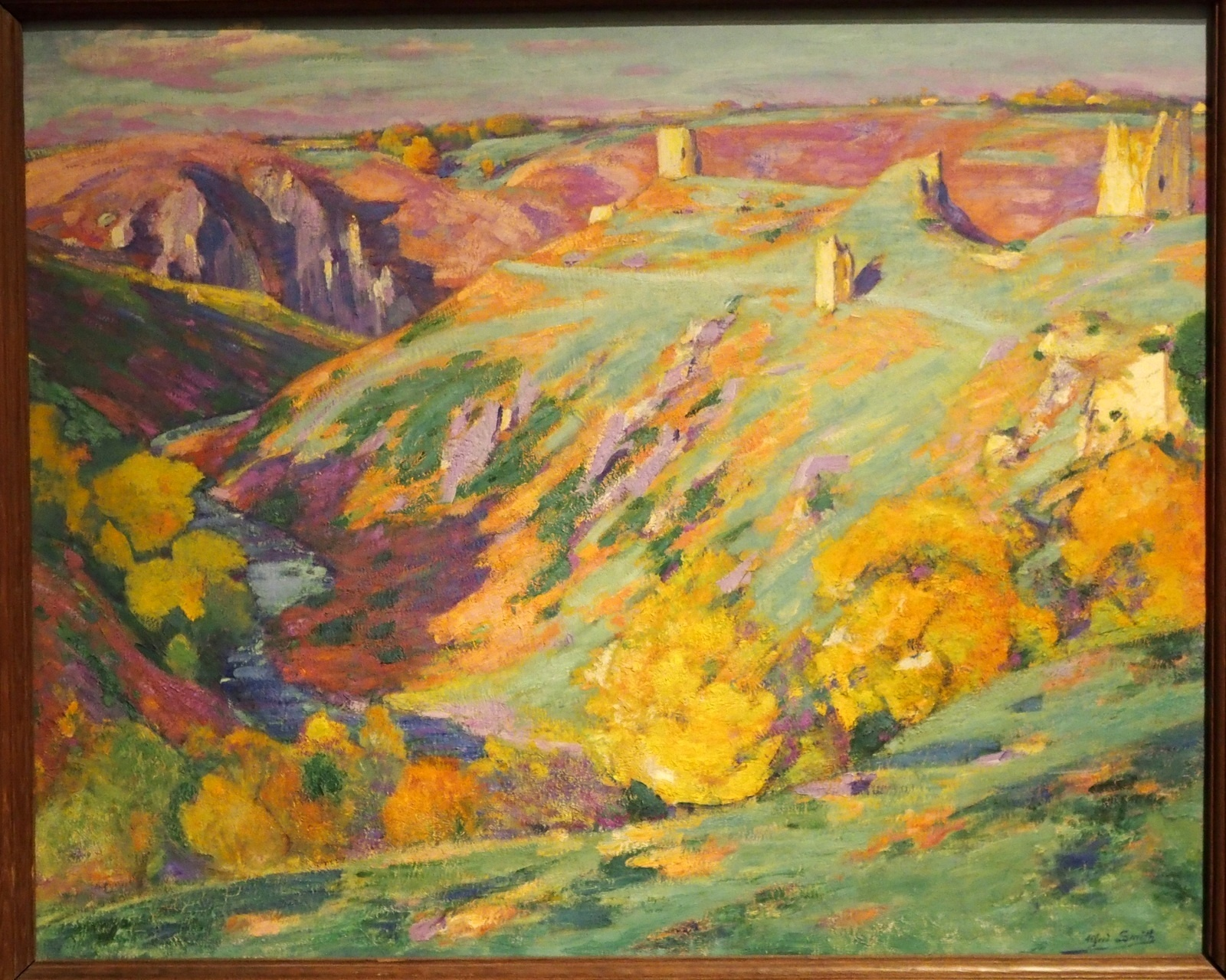
La Sédelle en octobre, by Alfred Smith (c. 1923.]

During the Second World War, the bridge separating the Creuse from Indre at Crozant was dynamited. A temporary pontoon bridge was installed pending the construction of the new bridge. Today, when the water level is low enough, one can still see a stone stack of the old bridge lying on its side.

== Sights ==
- The church of St. Etienne, dating from the twelfth century.
- The ruins of the 11th-century castle of Crozant, currently undergoing considerable restoration.
- The remains of the 15th-century château des Places.
- The chapel of St. Madeleine dating from the seventeenth century.
- The gardens and Arboretum de la Sédelle.

== Personalities ==
- Gilles Clément, gardener and botanist.
- Armand Guillaumin, painter.

== See also ==
- Communes of the Creuse department
