= Lac de Chambon =

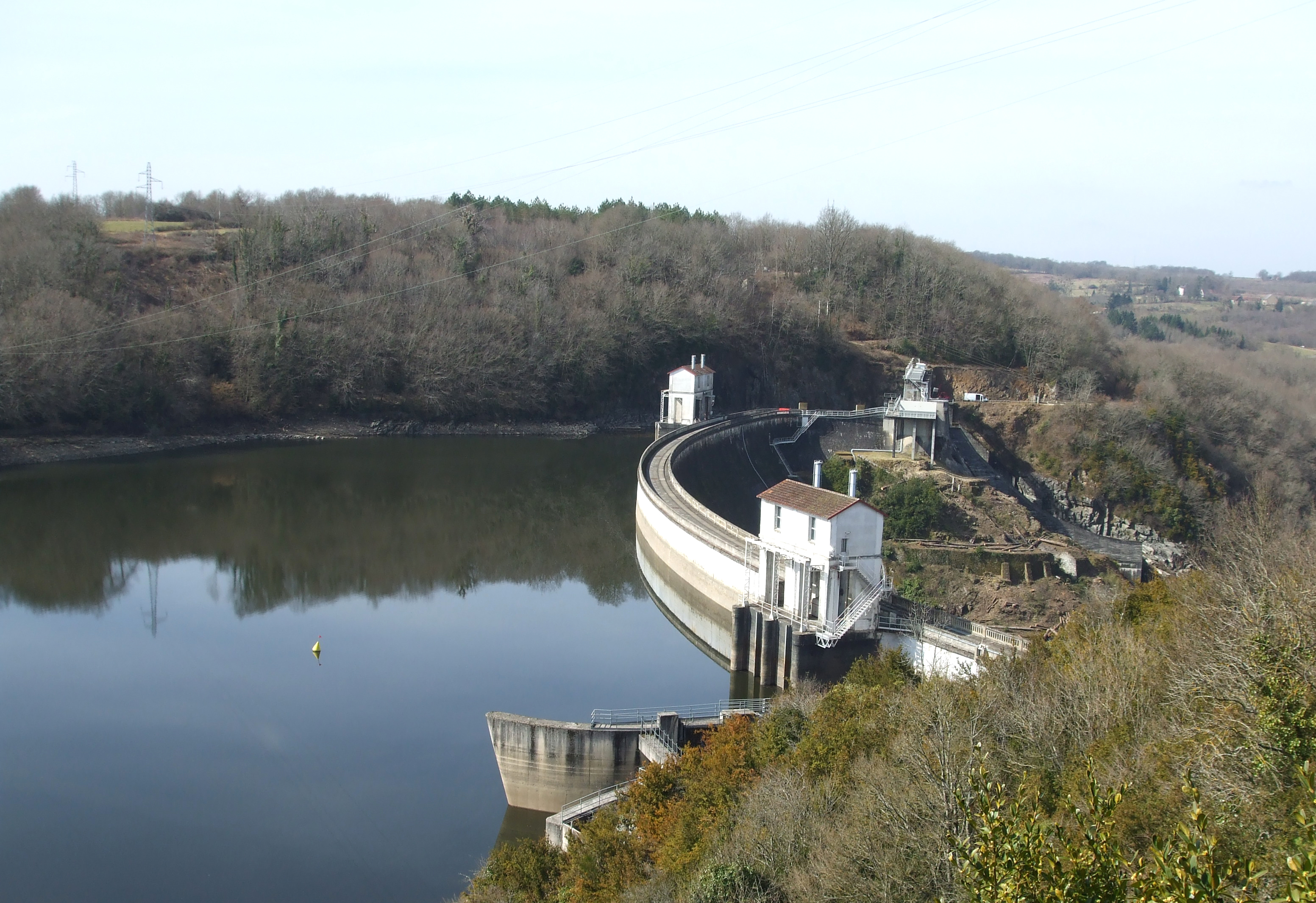

- Location within France
- Location: Indre (Centre-Val de Loire)
- Coordinates: 46°26′12″N 1°36′50″E
- Lake type: reservoir
- Primary inflows: Creuse
- Primary outflows: Creuse
- Basin countries: France
- Max. length: 16 km (9.9 mi)
- Surface area: 312 ha (770 acres)
- Average depth: 18.6 m (61 ft)
- Water volume: 58×10^{6} m^{3} (2.0×10^{9} cu ft)

The Lac de Chambon (Chambon Lake) is an artificial lake on the river Creuse, France, created by the Éguzon Dam, a hydroelectric dam. Beaches have been created around the lake, the largest in the Centre Region. There is a sailing school on the lake near Eguzon. Canoes, kayaks and pedalos can be hired in season. The lake is also very popular with waterskiers and anglers.

It is not to be confused with Lac Chambon in the Puy-de-Dôme department or Lac du Chambon in the Isère department.
