= Châteauroux =

Châteauroux Chasteurós (Occitan)
- Prefecture and commune
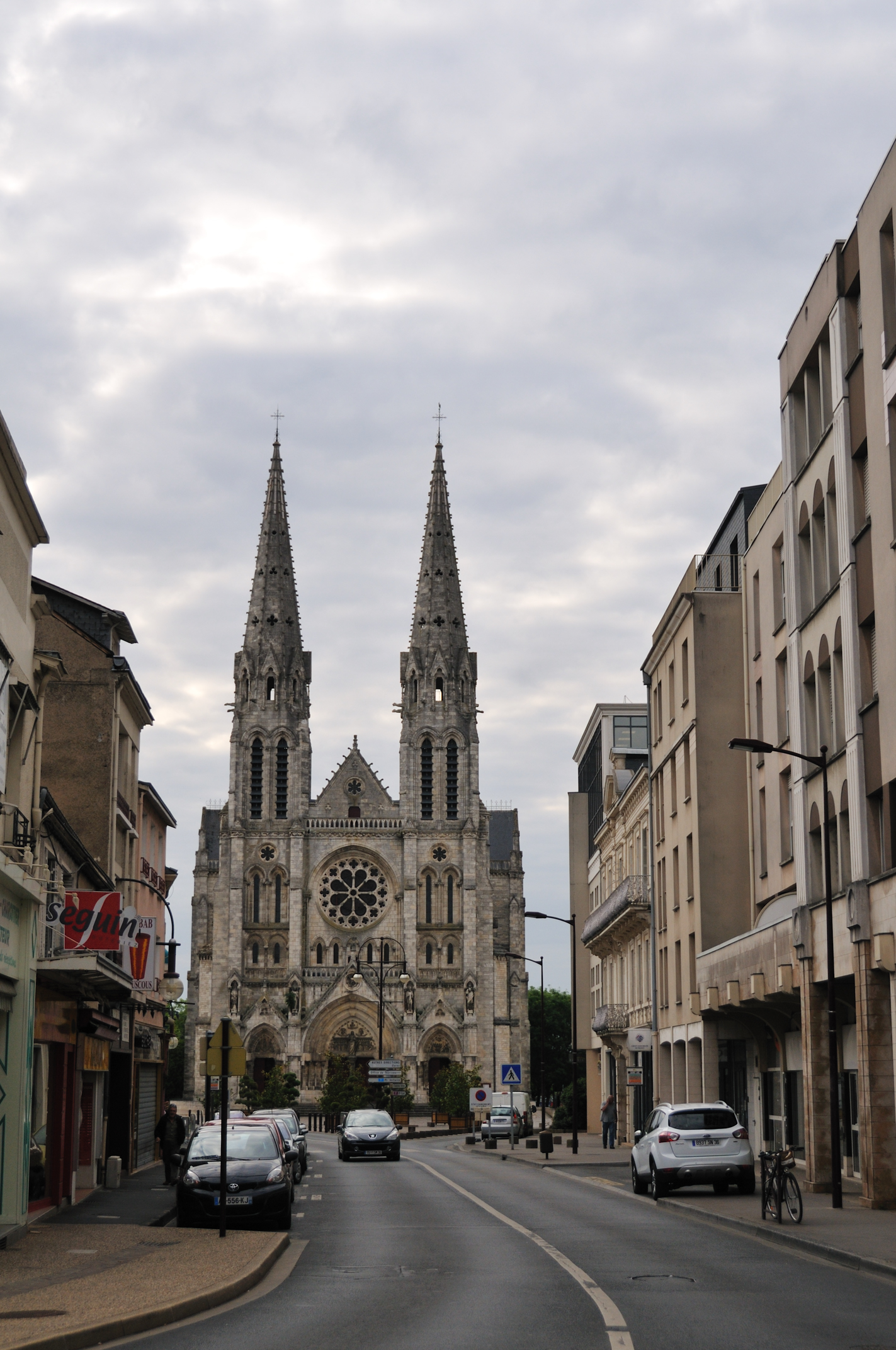
- St. Andrew's Church

- Flag Coat of arms
- Location of Châteauroux
- Location within France Location within Centre-Val de Loire
- Coordinates: 46°48′37″N 1°41′28″E
- Country: France
- Region: Centre-Val de Loire
- Department: Indre
- Arrondissement: Châteauroux
- Canton: Châteauroux-1, 2 and 3
- Intercommunality: CA Châteauroux Métropole

Government
  - Mayor (2020–2026): Gil Avérous
- Area^{1}: 25.54 km^{2} (9.86 sq mi)
- Elevation: 154 m (505 ft)
- Highest elevation: 164 m (538 ft)
- Lowest elevation: 132 m (433 ft)
- Population (2023): 42,963
  - Density: 1,682/km^{2} (4,357/sq mi)
- Time zone: UTC+01:00 (CET)
  - Summer (DST): UTC+02:00 (CEST)
- INSEE/Postal code: 36044 /36008
- ^{1} French Land Register data, which excludes lakes, ponds, glaciers > 1 km^{2} (0.386 sq mi or 247 acres) and river estuaries.

Châteauroux (/ˌʃætoʊˈruː/ SHAT-oh-ROO; French pronunciation: [ʃɑtoʁu]; Occitan: Chasteurós) is the capital city of the French department of Indre, central France and the second-largest town in the former province of Berry, after Bourges. Its residents are called Castelroussins (pronounced [kastɛlʁusɛ̃]) in French.

== Climate ==
Châteauroux temperatures range from an average February low of 1.3 °C (34 °F) to an average July and August high of 26.4 °C (80 °F).

Climate data for Châteauroux Déols, elevation: 158 m (518 ft) (1991–2020 normals, extremes 1893–present)
Month	Jan	Feb	Mar	Apr	May	Jun	Jul	Aug	Sep	Oct	Nov	Dec	Year
Record high °C (°F)	18.6 (65.5)	24.0 (75.2)	28.0 (82.4)	31.5 (88.7)	34.5 (94.1)	39.6 (103.3)	41.4 (106.5)	40.5 (104.9)	38.0 (100.4)	32.2 (90.0)	24.5 (76.1)	20.5 (68.9)	41.4 (106.5)
Mean daily maximum °C (°F)	7.7 (45.9)	9.1 (48.4)	13.2 (55.8)	16.3 (61.3)	20. (68)	23.8 (74.8)	26.4 (79.5)	26.4 (79.5)	22.3 (72.1)	17.3 (63.1)	11.5 (52.7)	8.2 (46.8)	16.9 (62.4)
Daily mean °C (°F)	4.7 (40.5)	5.2 (41.4)	8.4 (47.1)	10.9 (51.6)	14.6 (58.3)	18.2 (64.8)	20.4 (68.7)	20.4 (68.7)	16.7 (62.1)	12.9 (55.2)	8.0 (46.4)	5.1 (41.2)	12.1 (53.8)
Mean daily minimum °C (°F)	1.7 (35.1)	1.3 (34.3)	3.5 (38.3)	5.4 (41.7)	9.1 (48.4)	12.6 (54.7)	14.5 (58.1)	14.4 (57.9)	11.0 (51.8)	8.5 (47.3)	4.5 (40.1)	2.1 (35.8)	7.4 (45.3)
Record low °C (°F)	−22.8 (−9.0)	−22.8 (−9.0)	−10.8 (12.6)	−5.6 (21.9)	−1.4 (29.5)	1.2 (34.2)	4.0 (39.2)	4.5 (40.1)	0.0 (32.0)	−5.2 (22.6)	−8.7 (16.3)	−17.0 (1.4)	−22.8 (−9.0)
Average precipitation mm (inches)	57.5 (2.26)	46.5 (1.83)	50.4 (1.98)	65.5 (2.58)	72.6 (2.86)	58.3 (2.30)	56.7 (2.23)	56.9 (2.24)	59.5 (2.34)	71.9 (2.83)	65.6 (2.58)	67.2 (2.65)	728.6 (28.69)
Average precipitation days (≥ 1.0 mm)	10.9	9.1	9.3	10.1	10.3	8.3	7.7	6.8	7.6	10.6	11.5	11.2	113.6
Average snowy days	3.3	3.4	1.9	0.8	0.0	0.0	0.0	0.0	0.0	0.0	1.3	2.7	13.4
Average relative humidity (%)	88	85	79	75	76	74	69	70	76	84	88	88	79.3
Mean monthly sunshine hours	68.7	96.8	158.3	186.0	213.3	217.9	243.0	239.7	194.5	129.1	81.5	62.7	1,891.3
Source 1: Meteociel
Source 2: Infoclimat.fr (humidity and snowy days, 1961–1990)

== History ==
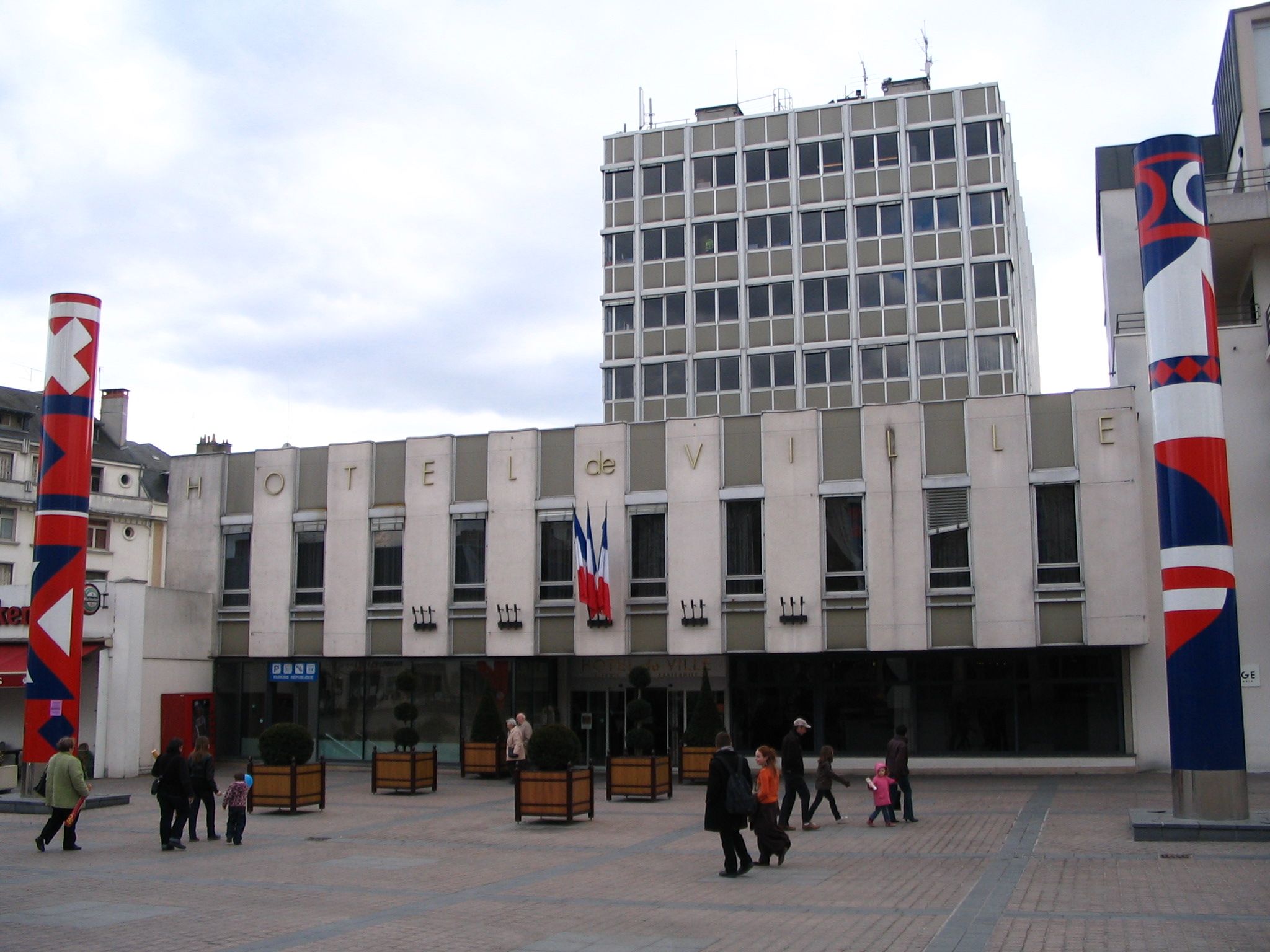
The Hôtel de Ville

The old town, close to the river, forms a nucleus around which a newer and more extensive quarter, bordered by boulevards, has grown up. The suburbs of St. Christophe and Déols lie on the right bank of the Indre. The castle from which the city takes its name was built in the latter part of the 10th century by Raoul, prince of Déols.

From 920 to 1008, the Norman raids forced the monks of the abbey of Saint-Gildas-de-Rhuys, founded in Brittany by Saint Gildas, to bring his relics to the abbey of Saint-Gildas of Châteauroux that they founded under the protection of the prince Ebbes of Déols, father of Raoul. During the Middle Ages, it was the seat of a seigniory. It was passed to the Chauvigny from 1207 to 1473. It was raised to the rank of countship in 1497 for Jean V d'Aumont.

In 1616, when it was held by Henry II, Prince of Condé, it was raised to the rank of duchy. In 1736, it returned to the crown. It was given to Marie Anne de Mailly-Nesle, duchess of Châteauroux, by Louis XV in 1744. The present Château Raoul housing the préfecture offices dates from the 15th century.

The Hôtel de Ville was completed in 1977.

== Awards ==
Châteauroux is one of the communes awarded the grand prize by the Concours National des Villes et Villages Fleuris, a beautification initiative begun in 1959.

== Monuments ==
- Château Raoul, 15th century
- Church of St. André, 19th century
- Church of St. Martial, 12th-16th century
- Église Notre-Dame, 19th century
- Convent of the Cordeliers, 13th century
- Équinoxe
- La Prairie St. Gildas
- Le Parc de loisirs de Belle-Isle
- Le Tarmac
- Musée Bertrand
- Musée des Arts et Traditions Populaires
- Musée du Compagnonnage
- Public Garden and the Jardins des Cordeliers
- Quartier St. Christophe

== Sports ==
=== Football ===
La Berrichonne de Châteauroux is the town's football club based in Châteauroux, founded in 1883. The team currently plays in National, the third division of French football, and played only one season in Ligue 1 in 1997–98. Châteauroux reached the final of the 2003–04 Coupe de France, where they were defeated 1–0 by Paris Saint-Germain, qualifying for the following season's UEFA Cup. The team plays its home fixtures at the 17,173-capacity Stade Gaston Petit.

As Chateauroux was an Air Force base from 1952 until 1967, American football was played in Chateauroux by a team called Sabres. "Sabres" was one of the best European military teams, playing against other French and German teams. Local French people created a football club in the French American football championship. The name chosen is "Sabres", to celebrate the pioneers, to pay homage to the Americans who were the first.

=== Tour de France ===
Châteauroux has been host to the Tour de France multiple times. The most successful cyclist at Châteauroux is Mark Cavendish with three stage wins, leading up to the final straight being labeled "Avenue Cavendish".

Year	Stage	Start of stage	Distance (km)	Stage winner
1998	5	Cholet	228.5	Mario Cipollini (ITA)
2008	5	Cholet	232.0	Mark Cavendish (GBR)
2011	7	Le Mans	218.0	Mark Cavendish (GBR)
2021	6	Tours	160.6	Mark Cavendish (GBR)
2025	9	Chinon	174.1	Tim Merlier (BEL)

=== Paris 2024 ===
The National Shooting Centre at Châteauroux hosted the shooting events for the 2024 Summer Olympics in Paris.

== Festivals ==
- Bals'arts
- Festival Country Good Old Days Châteauroux
- Festival de théâtre "les Nocthalies"
- Festival Multirythmes
- Festival Populaire du Folklore
- Forum des associations
- La Biennale de Céramique contemporaine
- La Châteauroux Classic d'Indre Trophée Fenioux
- Les Litztomanias
- Rock à Belle-Isle
- Salon du livre de Châteauroux
- Stage festival de danse de Châteauroux (DARC)
- Vendredi...Musique

== Transport ==
Direct services from Châteauroux railway station connect Paris, Orléans, Limoges, Toulouse, and several other regional destinations. The A20 motorway connects Châteauroux with Vierzon, Brive-la-Gaillarde, and Toulouse.

The city offers free public transportation since 2001. Total ridership is up 208% between 2001 and 2012.

The city is served by Châteauroux-Centre "Marcel Dassault" Airport, which is in the commune of Déols to the North. The airport is used mainly for cargo, maintenance, training, and light aviation but also serves seasonal charter services. However, there are no schedule passenger flights to and from the airport. The nearest airport is in poitiers, 80 miles west of Châteauroux.

== Notable people ==
=== Born in Châteauroux ===
- Henri Gratien, Comte Bertrand (1773–1844), general of Napoleon's army
- Albert Aurier (1865–1892), symbolist poet, writer and art critic
- Marcel Boussac (1889–1980), entrepreneur and horse breeder
- Robert Falcucci (1900-1989), illustrator
- Jack Claude Nezat (born 1943), author, City Councilor of Lésigny (France), initiator of Lésigny-Leingarten twinning, founder and first President of Rencontres Franco Allemandes, Annecy (Annecy-Bayreuth twinning)
- Gérard Depardieu (born 1948), actor and businessman
- Dean Brown (born 1955), jazz guitarist
- Mardi Jacquet (born 1960), playmate
- Estelle Touzet (born 1981), chef sommelier.
- Gilles Sunu (born 1991), footballer

=== Others associated with the area ===
- Jean Lauron (1560–1620), poet
- Pierre Leroux (1797–1871), philosopher and politician
- Napoléon Chaix (1807–1865), publisher
- Adolphe Combanaire (1859–1939), writer
- Fernand Maillaud (1862–1948), painter
- Bernard Naudin (1876–1946), painter and designer
- Ernest Nivet (1871–1948), sculptor
- Émile Goué (1904–1946), composer
- Édouard Ramonet (1909–1980), politician
- Jean Fourton (1934-), writer, humanist, painter, and psychoanalyst. Former town councilor of Châteauroux (1957 to 1967).

== International relations ==
Châteauroux is twinned with:

- Gütersloh, Germany, since 1977
- Bittou, Burkina Faso, since 1985
- Olsztyn, Poland, since 1991
- Fresno, United States, since 2016
- Jinhua, China, since 2019

== Population ==
Historical population

Year	Pop.	±% p.a.
1793	7,503	—
1800	8,049	+1.01%
1806	8,512	+0.94%
1821	10,429	+1.36%
1831	11,587	+1.06%
1836	13,847	+3.63%
1841	13,551	−0.43%
1846	14,517	+1.39%
1851	15,931	+1.88%
1856	18,237	+2.74%
1861	16,170	−2.38%
1866	17,161	+1.20%
1872	18,670	+1.41%
1876	19,442	+1.02%
1881	21,179	+1.73%
1886	22,860	+1.54%
1891	23,924	+0.91%
1896	23,863	−0.05%
1901	24,957	+0.90%

Year	Pop.	±% p.a.
1906	25,437	+0.38%
1911	26,095	+0.51%
1921	26,566	+0.18%
1926	25,806	−0.58%
1931	26,707	+0.69%
1936	28,578	+1.36%
1946	34,611	+1.93%
1954	36,420	+0.64%
1962	45,063	+2.70%
1968	49,138	+1.45%
1975	53,429	+1.20%
1982	51,942	−0.40%
1990	50,969	−0.24%
1999	49,632	−0.29%
2007	47,127	−0.65%
2012	44,960	−0.94%
2017	43,741	−0.55%
2023	42,963	−0.30%

Source: EHESS and INSEE (1968-2023)

== See also ==
- Berrichonne de Châteauroux
- Châteauroux-Déols "Marcel Dassault" Airport
- Communes of the Indre department
- Counts and Dukes of Châteauroux
- Marie-Anne de Mailly-Nesle duchess de Châteauroux
- Saint-Benoît-du-Sault
