= Fernand Maillaud =

French painter

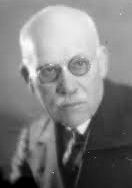
- Born: 12 December 1862; Mouhet
- Died: 30 August 1948 (aged 85); Paris

Fernand Maillaud (1862-1948) was a French painter, illustrator, ébéniste and tapestry designer.

== Biography ==
His father was a carpenter, and his mother was a teacher. They moved frequently as his mother was reassigned. In 1878, when his father became ill, he was sent to work as a clerk in Issoudun, then La Châtre. After his military service, in 1882, he was employed as a department store salesman in Paris. He married Fernande Sevry in 1886. Soon after, he pursued his interest in drawing at the École des Beaux-Arts, with Adolphe Yvon. While he studied, Fernande worked as a seamstress. Later, he provided illustrations for the journal, La Famille, and drew models for a fashion newspaper.

Upon the recommendation of Father Jules Chevalier, he composed six large panels for the convent of the Daughters of Our Lady of the Sacred Heart. His debut at the Salon came in 1896. He would exhibit there annually until his death. He made an extended trip to Italy in 1899. During these years, he also began to design furniture and tapestries.

From 1895 to 1902, he spent the summers at Fresselines, near Crozant. There, he befriended the poet, Maurice Rollinat who, in turn, introduced him to Ferdinand Humbert; an influential painter who helped to promote his career by obtaining government commissions. From 1902 to 1907, his summers were spent in Verneuil-sur-Igneraie, near Nohant, in a villa named "Épingués". There, he painted his usual landscapes, as well as the markets and other public places. He also embroidered tapestries, that were shown at the regular Salon and the Salon d'automne. In 1913, he discovered Corrèze; spending his summers there until 1935.

During World War I, he continued to exhibit throughout France and abroad. In 1918, he had a showing in Rio de Janeiro, then in Paris at the galleries of the Maison Devambez. Later, he and Fernande opened a tapestry workshop in Issoudun. In 1920, when his sister-in-law moved her family to Guéret, a visit there encouraged him to build another villa, called "Renabec", where he stayed every summer after 1923. In the late 1920s, he gradually developed a preference for southern, Mediterranean, colors and light. This prompted him to build another, isolated house, near Toulon, on the slopes of Mont Coudon, called "La Florentine".

He took his first trip to North Africa in 1932; visiting Oran and Algiers. He would return there every winter until 1938. During his last trip, he also spent time painting in Morocco. During the years of World War II, he lived at "La Florentine", where Fernande died in 1945. He died three years later, in Paris, in the home of his niece, the painter Solange Christauflour.

Streets have been named after him in La Châtre, Châteauroux and Guéret. A public school in Étrechet also bears his name.

== Selected works ==
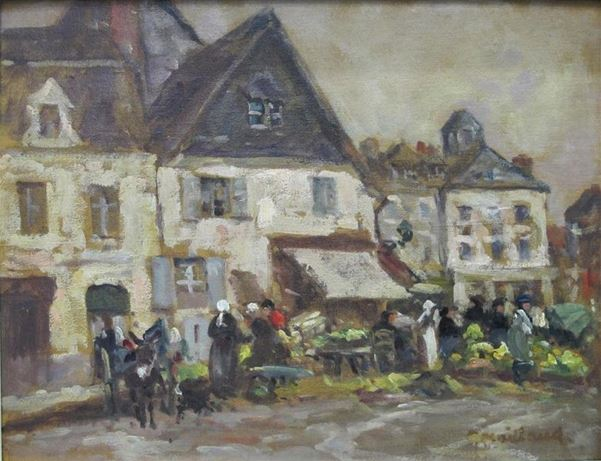
Market Scene in a Village

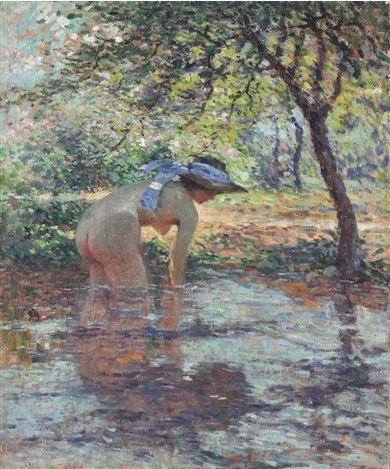
Bather with a Hat

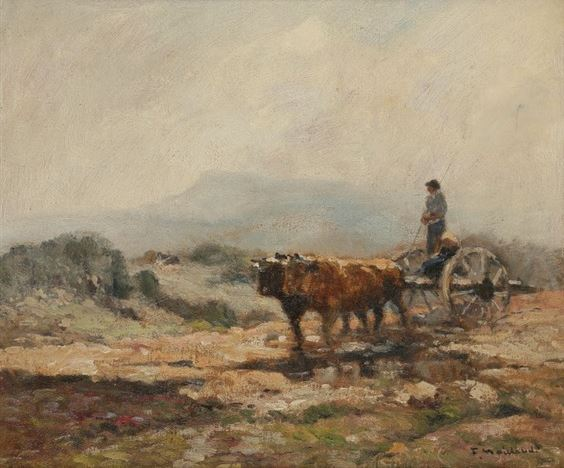
Peasant on a Cart

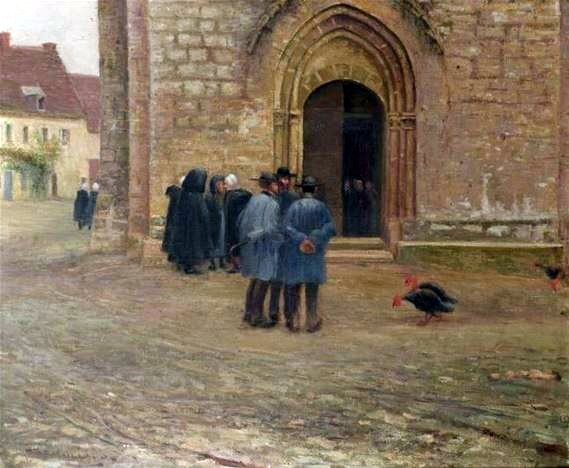
Leaving Church in Fresselines
