= Ernest Nivet =

French sculptor (1871–1948)

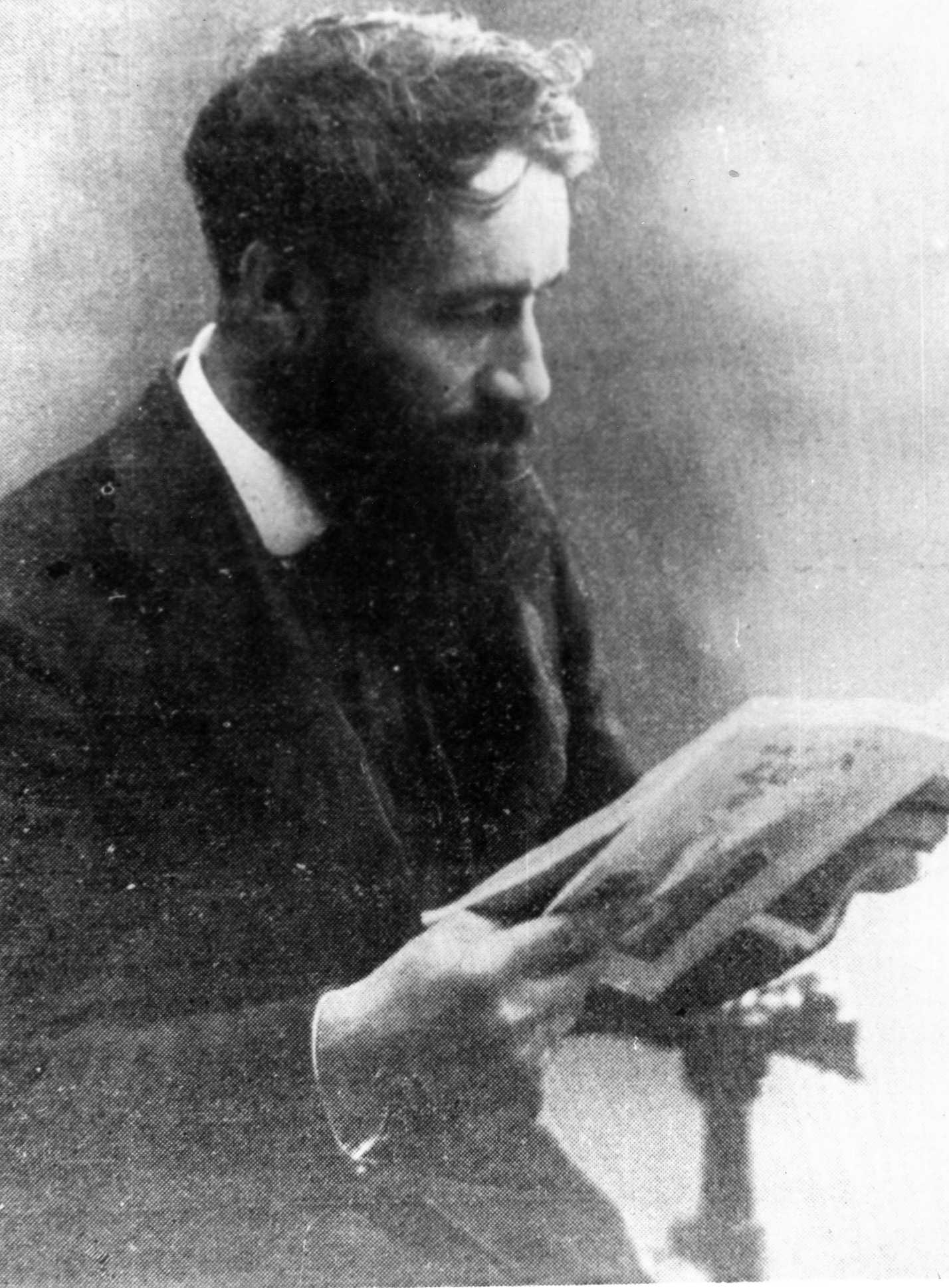
Ernest Nivet (c. 1909)

Ernest Nivet (7 October 1871, Levroux – 5 February 1948, Châteauroux) was a French sculptor, known for his war monuments and memorials.

== Biography ==
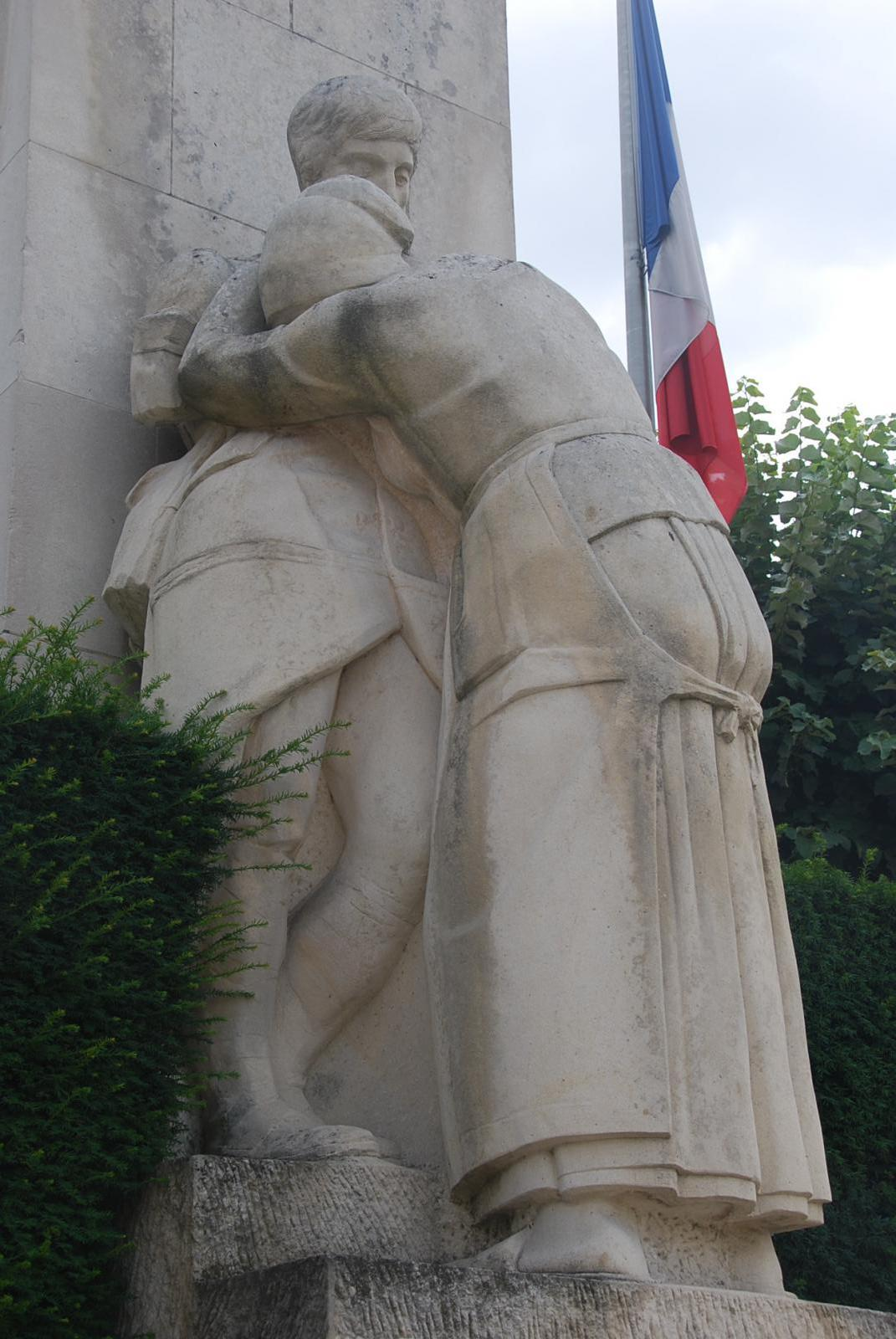
Monument to the Dead, in Châteauroux

His father was a hired day laborer. Ernest and his four siblings often helped out in the fields. Throughout his life, he would retain a concern for the lives of the common workers.

At the age of ten, he accompanied his family on a visit to Châteauroux and saw a niche figure of the Pietà, from the 16th century, in a local church. This gave him the desire to become a sculptor. His family was sympathetic, and allowed him to take up an apprenticeship with a stonemason near the cemetery there. He was also able to attend free drawing classes, offered by the municipality at a former convent. His teacher, Jean-Baptiste Bourda (1847-1920), was a former student of Eugène Devéria. During this period, he created some small busts and medallions.

Following Bourda's advice, he left for Paris in 1891. There, with the assistance of a grant from Châteauroux, he was able to enroll at the École Nationale Supérieure des Beaux-Arts, where he studied with Alexandre Falguière. Shortly, however, he found himself disappointed with his teacher. Thanks to chance meeting with Georges Lenseign, a merchant and art lover from his hometown, he was able to obtain an introduction and a recommendation to Auguste Rodin. Impressed by photographs of the young man's work, Rodin hired him as an assistant in his workshop.

Although he learned much of inestimable value, he was able to do very little original work, mostly on the occasional visit home, and Rodin's overwhelming personality eventually began to chafe on him. Rodin, on the other hand, was quite satisfied with him, and signed a five-year employment contract in 1894. Nevertheless, he increasingly felt stifled, and his health began to suffer. He also became homesick. Despite the advice of his friends and associates, he broke the contract and returned to Châteauroux in 1895.

Once home, he began to suffer financial difficulties but, thanks to the support of loyal friends and a few orders for busts, he was able to survive. Participating in local exhibitions, and the Salon, helped to publicize his name. In 1899, he received his first major commission, a monument to the dead of the Franco-Prussian War, in Buzançais. Numerous commissions followed, throughout the early 1910s.

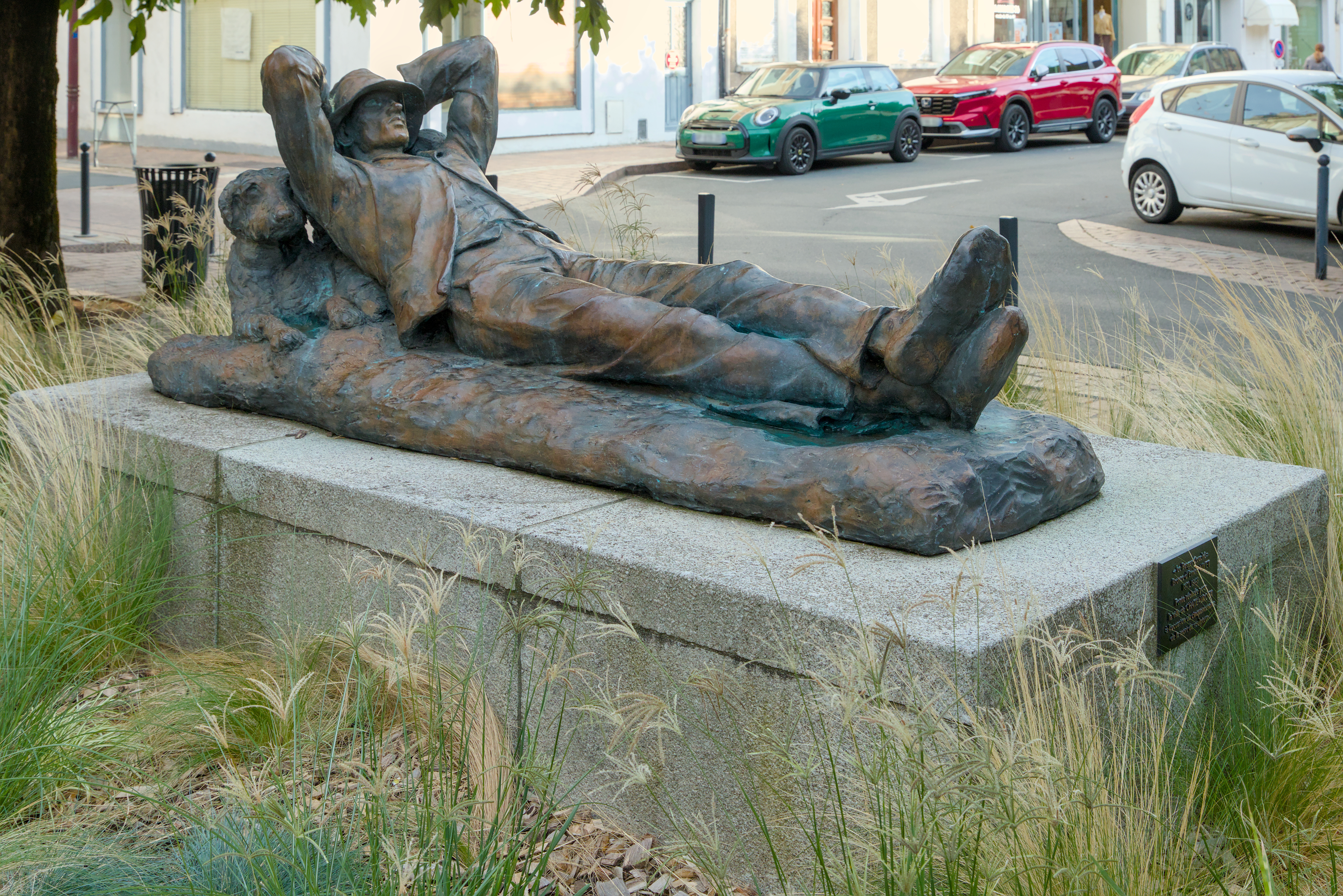
The Shepherd Lying with His Dog, in Châteauroux.

His career was interrupted by the First World War. From 1915 to 1916, he was mobilized as a sapper, along the Western Front near Aisne. In 1917, he lost his father, his wife, and his former master Rodin, with whom he had maintained a friendly correspondence. After being demobilized, he attempted to dispel his sadness by expressing it through his work. Over the next decade, many communities throughout Central France decreed the erection of war monuments, and he provided several. In 1923, he received a gold medal at the Salon and, the following year, was named a Knight in the Legion of Honor.

In 1937, his best known war memorial, in his hometown, was unveiled in the presence of France's Minister of War, Yvon Delbos. That same year, he was awarded the Grand Prize at the Exposition Internationale des Arts et Techniques dans la Vie Moderne. During the 1930s, he created several small works in bronze, including a bust of the poet, Gabriel Nigond, all of which were melted down for war materiel by the Vichy Régime.

He continued to produce smaller works throughout World War II, mostly in the form of busts, and died at his home in 1948.

== Sources ==
- Francesca Lacour, "Ernest Nivet, un praticien de Rodin en Berry", in: Sculptures de l’Indre, Belles comme un rêve de pierre, Patrimoine de l'Indre, 2011 ISBN 978-2-911948-34-3
- Lucien Lacour, Souvenir et commémoration. Les monuments aux morts de l'Indre, Patrimoine de l'Indre, Châteauroux, 2011
- Bertrand Tillier, Ernest Nivet, le paysan, le sculpteur et la terre, Paris, Librairie Séguier, 2001 ISBN 978-2-8404-9190-3
- Francesca Lacour and Lucien Lacour, preface by Anne Pingeot: Ernest Nivet (1871-1948). Vie et destinée d'un praticien de Rodin, Ed. Lucien Souny, 2018 ISBN 978-2-84886-677-2 (Online)
