= Éguzon-Chantôme =

- Commune
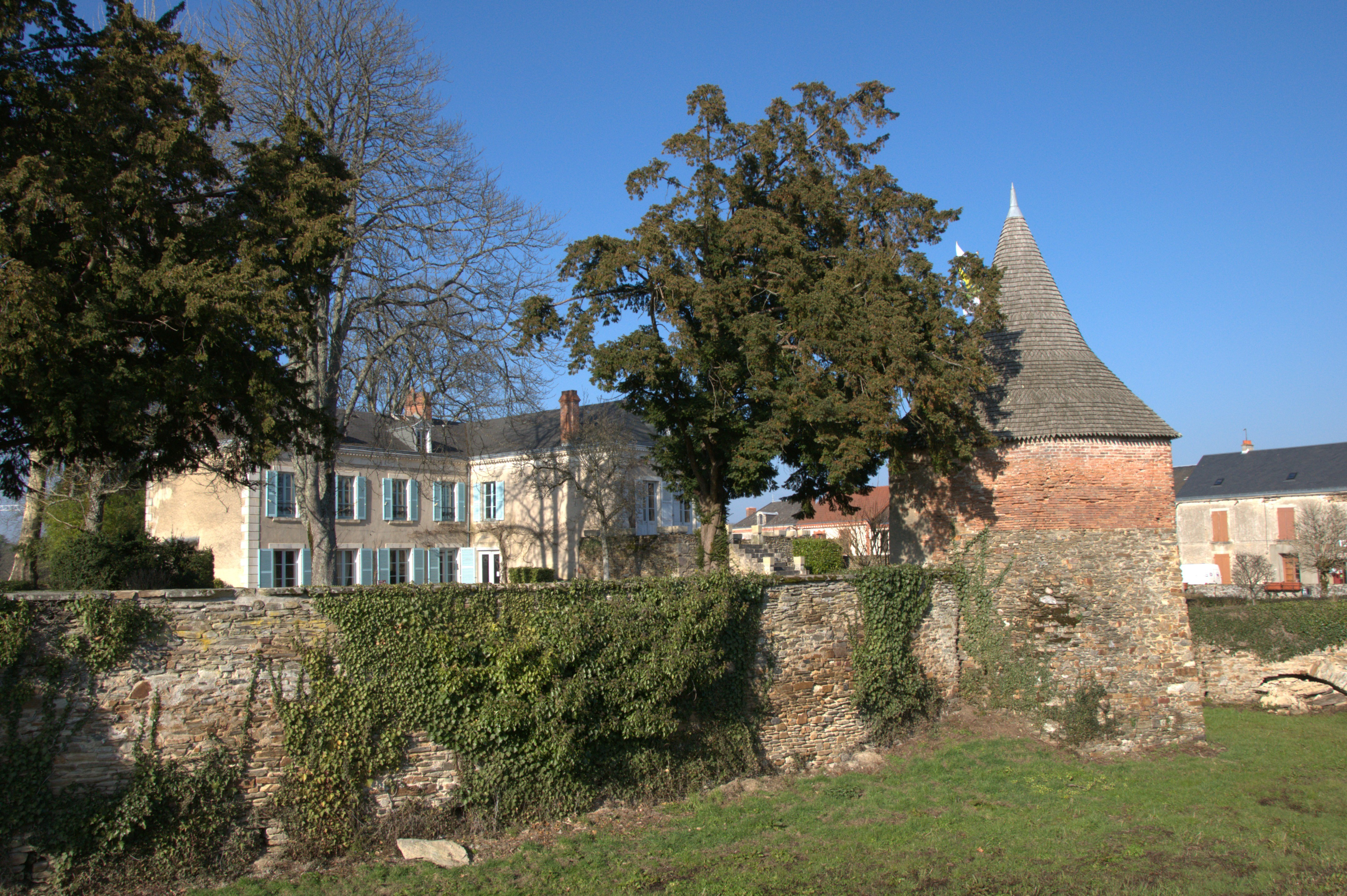
- The town hall in Éguzon-Chantôme

- Coat of arms
- Location of Éguzon-Chantôme
- Location within France Location within Centre-Val de Loire
- Coordinates: 46°26′35″N 1°35′01″E
- Country: France
- Region: Centre-Val de Loire
- Department: Indre
- Arrondissement: Châteauroux
- Canton: Argenton-sur-Creuse

Government
  - Mayor (2020–2026): Jean-Paul Thibaudeau
- Area^{1}: 36.44 km^{2} (14.07 sq mi)
- Elevation: 240 m (790 ft)
- Highest elevation: 319 m (1,047 ft)
- Lowest elevation: 142 m (466 ft)
- Population (2023): 1,301
  - Density: 35.70/km^{2} (92.47/sq mi)
- Time zone: UTC+01:00 (CET)
  - Summer (DST): UTC+02:00 (CEST)
- INSEE/Postal code: 36070 /36270
- ^{1} French Land Register data, which excludes lakes, ponds, glaciers > 1 km^{2} (0.386 sq mi or 247 acres) and river estuaries.

Éguzon-Chantôme (French pronunciation: [eɡyzɔ̃ ʃɑ̃tom]; Limousin: Aguson e Chantòsma) is a commune in the Indre department in central France.

It is situated on the river Creuse. A nearby hydroelectric dam (the Éguzon Dam), opened in 1923, provides electricity and also creates a lake (Lac de Chambon) that is used for leisure and watersports. The commune is listed as a Village étape.

== Geography ==
The river Abloux forms all of the commune's western border and the Creuse, with the Chambon Lake, forms all of its eastern border.

== Population ==
Historical population
Year	Pop.	±% p.a.
1968	1,605	—
1975	1,520	−0.77%
1982	1,459	−0.58%
1990	1,384	−0.66%
1999	1,373	−0.09%
2007	1,411	+0.34%
2012	1,424	+0.18%
2017	1,384	−0.57%
2023	1,301	−1.03%
Source: INSEE

== See also ==
- Communes of the Indre department
