= Pierre Ernest Ballue =

French painter and designer

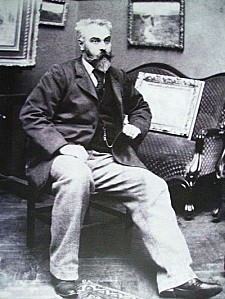
Pierre Ernest Ballue

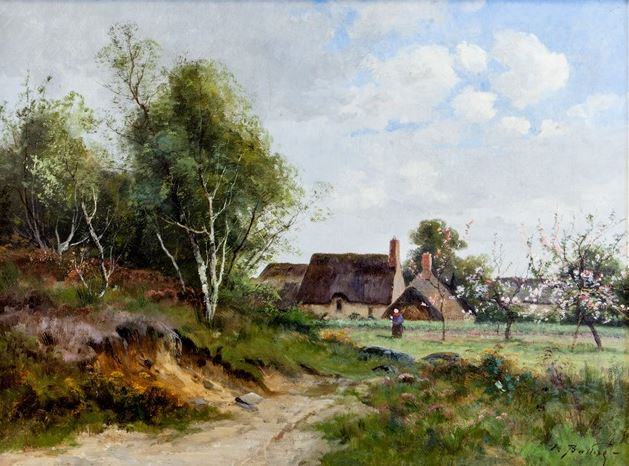
A Village with Apple Trees in Bloom

Pierre Ernest Ballue (27 February 1855 – 18 May 1928) was a French landscape painter and designer, associated with the Barbizon School.

== Biography ==
He was born in La Haye-Descartes. His family's presence there and in Buxeuil goes back to the sixteenth century. Two of his relatives served as mayors of the municipality: René (1804–1807) and Pierre (1816–1830). His parents relocated to Paris in 1867. There he studied art with Alexandre Defaux, Émile Charles Dameron, and Camille Corot.

He became a regular exhibitor at the Salon and was awarded several medals. His favored place for painting was Touraine, but he travelled throughout France, to the Côte d'Azur, the area around Crozant, and in Fresselines. In 1886, he was one of the artists who accompanied Auguste Bartholdi to the United States, to celebrate the inauguration of the Statue of Liberty.

In 1895, he married Thérèse Pomey, a genre painter and miniaturist, who had been a student of her father, Louis Edmond Pomey (1831–1891). They had two daughters, Marie-Louise and Jeanne, who married the veterinarian André Goupille. During World War II, she and André were members of the Resistance.

Ballue died in his hometown. A street there has been named in his honor.

His works may be seen at the Musée Bertrand, the Louvre, and the Musée des beaux-arts de Tours.
