= Hôtel de Ville, Châteauroux =

Town hall in Châteauroux, France

Hôtel de Ville
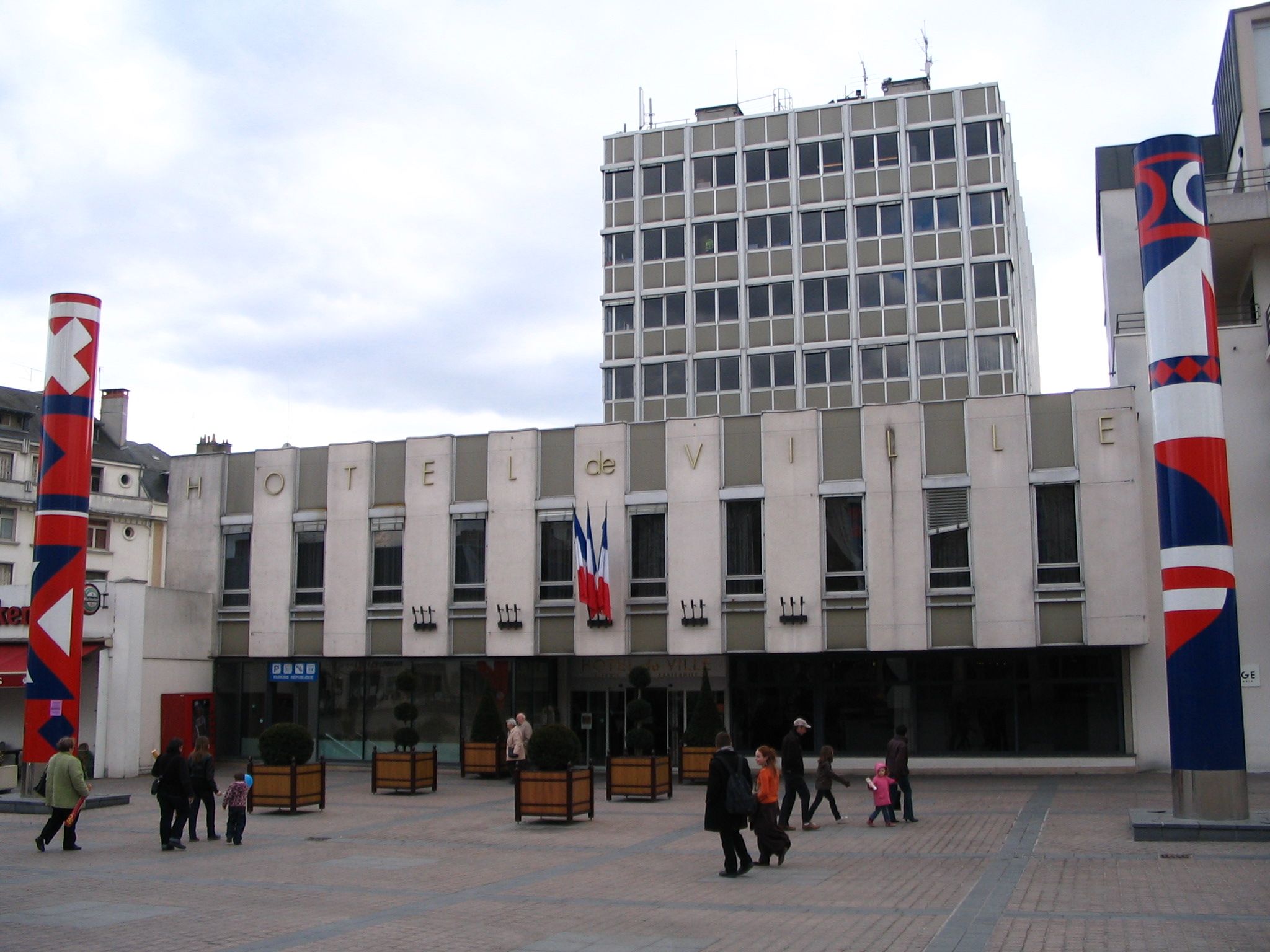
- The main frontage of the Hôtel de Ville in March 2009
- Interactive map of the Hôtel de Ville area

General information
- Type: City hall
- Architectural style: Modern style
- Location: Châteauroux, France
- Coordinates: 46.8112°N 1.6913°E
- Completed: 1977

Design and construction
- Architects: Pierre Bouguin, Gisèle Fiaud, Jean Maret, and Marc Mogenet

The Hôtel de Ville (French pronunciation: [otɛl də vil], City Hall) is a municipal building in Châteauroux, Indre, in central France, standing on Place de la République.

== History ==
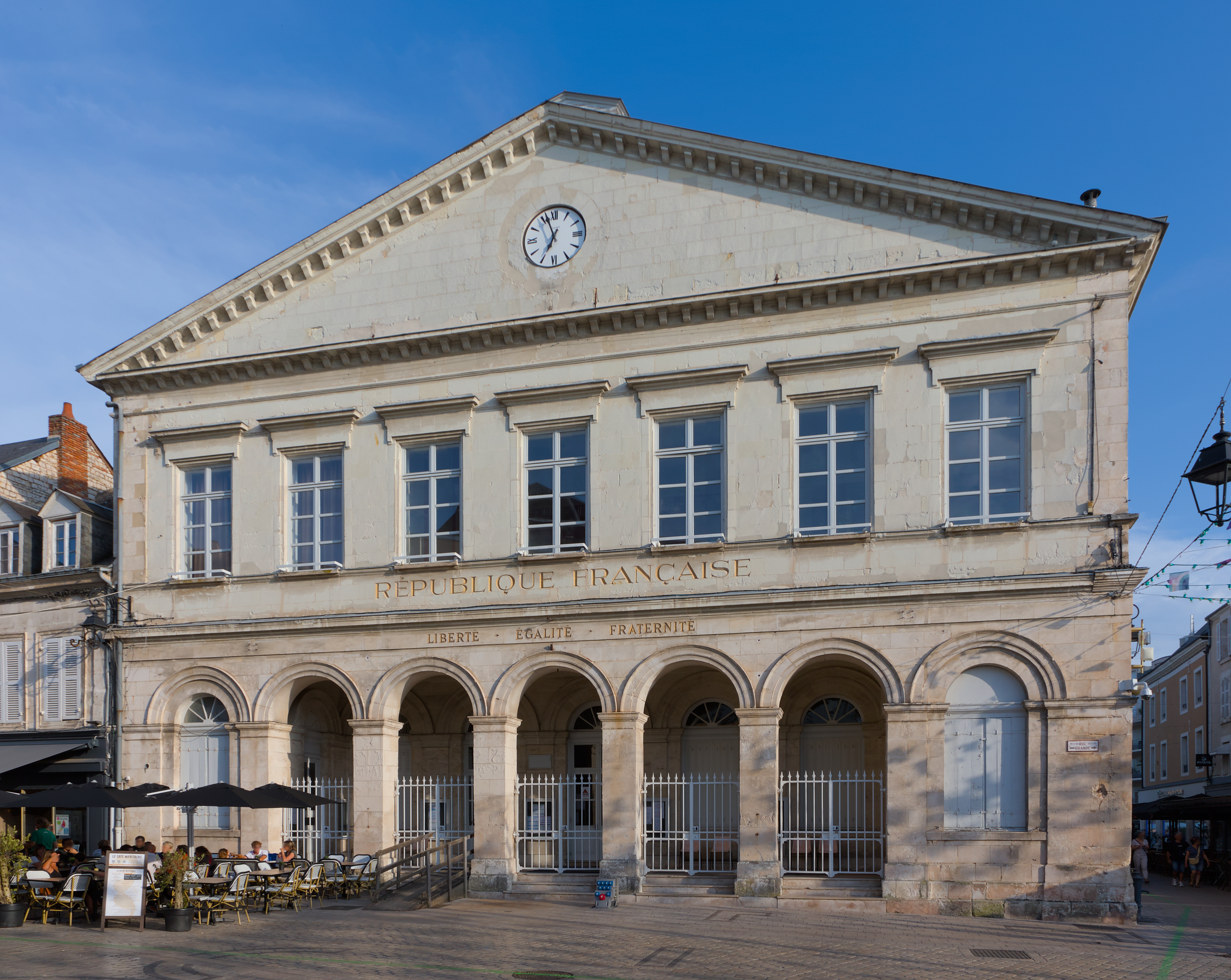
The old town hall

In the Middle Ages meetings of the mayor and the aldermen were held in the Maison du Temple (House of the Templers), which was close to the Church of Saint-André on Place Voltaire. Later meetings were held at the Palais Royal, a site now occupied by the Tribunal Judiciaire on Place Lucien Germereau.

Following the French Revolution, the new council decided to commission a dedicated town hall. The site they selected was on the south side of the market square (now Place Robert Monestier) facing the market hall. The new building was designed by Pierre Murison in the neoclassical style, built in ashlar stone and was completed in 1828. The design involved a symmetrical main frontage of seven bays facing onto the market square. The central five bays were arcaded with round headed openings, formed by square columns supporting imposts and moulded surrounds. The outer bays contained raised openings for the delivery of goods. The first floor was fenestrated by seven casement windows with cornices and, at roof level, there was a modillioned pediment with a clock in the tympanum.

Following significant population growth, municipal functions and services were relocated to other locations: the museum moved to Hôtel Bertrand in 1921, and environmental services relocated to the community centre on Rue Rabelais in 1937. After the liberation of the town by the French Forces of the Interior on 10 September 1944, during the Second World War, the local communist party politician, Georges Joseph (known by his pseudonym "Henriet"), stood on a platform in front of the town hall and paid tribute to the members of the Maquis who had died fighting German troops.

In the post-war era, conditions in the old town hall remained cramped: the public library moved to the community centre on Rue Rabelais in 1958, technical services moved to a building on Rue Diderot in 1965 and other departments relocated to a building on Rue des Pavillons in 1971. After finding these arrangements unsatisfactory, the council decided to consolidate its activities at one location. The site they selected on Rue Victor Hugo was occupied by the Hôtel Sainte-Catherine which established in the early 18th century and served as accommodation to officers of the United States Air Force during the Second World War.

The new building was designed by Pierre Bouguin, Gisèle Fiaud, Jean Maret, and Marc Mogenet in the modern style, built in concrete and glass at a cost of FFr16 million, and was officially opened by the mayor, Daniel Bernardet, on 18 January 1977. The layout involved a two-storey elongated rectangular podium, with a five-storey service block above, facing onto Place de la République. The first floor of the podium served as a civic area and was faced with a series of alternating vertical sections of glass and concrete. Internally, the principal room was the Salle du Conseil (council chamber) on the first floor.
