= Arboretum de la Sédelle =

Private arboretum in Crozant, Creuse, France

Coordinates: 46.3958°N 1.6203°E

The Arboretum de la Sédelle (10 hectares) is a private arboretum located in Villejoint, Crozant, Creuse, Limousin, France. It is open several afternoons a week in the warmer months; an admission fee is charged.

The arboretum was established in 1980 by Nell and Philippe Wanty on wooded lands along the Sédelle river valley. Maples were the first plantings. Today the arboretum has grown to contain more than 370 taxa of woody plants, including major collections of Acer (130 taxa including 90 species and subspecies, with the remainder cultivars), Viburnum (27 taxa), Quercus (27), Cornus (23), Euonymus (15), Rhus (10), Tilia (9), and Liquidambar (4).

== See also ==
- List of botanical gardens in France
