= Jean Fourton =

French painter

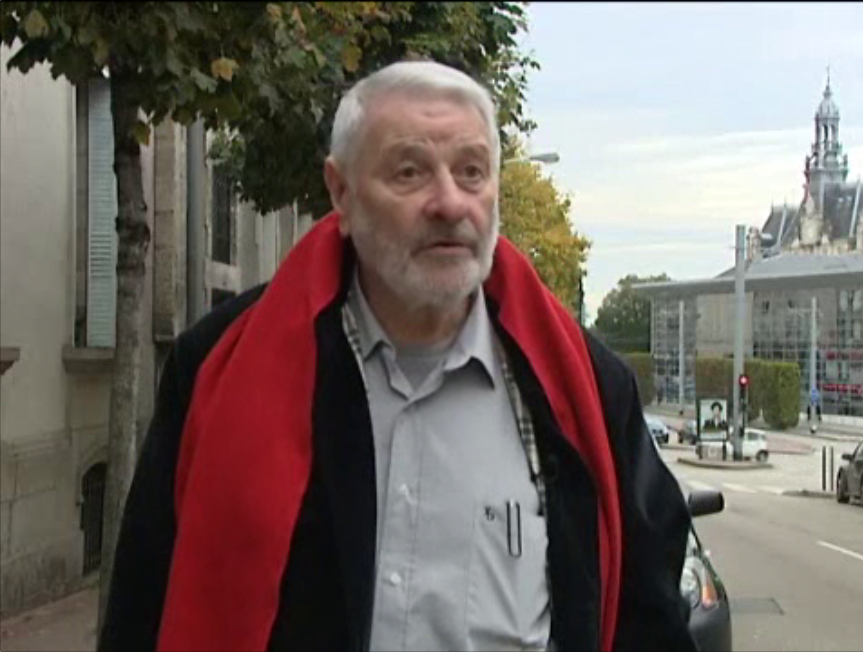

Jean Fourton (born 1934 in Puy-en-Velay, France) is a writer, humanist, painter and psychoanalyst.

== Career ==
Born 1934 in Puy-en-Velay, France, Fourton lived in North America after World War II. Upon returning to France, he worked as a journalist for several publications.

In 1958, at 24 years old, under the official patronage of the Ministère de la Reconstruction (Ministry of Reconstruction), he publishes in two volumes an 800-page encyclopedia on industrial decentralization in France (Panorama de la décentralisation).

Then he founded a printing office and a publishing house. He wrote U. S… et coutumes en France, a satire of Americans in France, published by Editions Rabelais and illustrated by Bernard Aldebert.

Between 1971 and 1980 he works with Jacques Lacan who was his own psychoanalyst. He becomes member of the École Freudienne de Paris (Freudian School of Paris) and starts working as a psychoanalyst.

In 1972 Roland Barthes is one of his teachers. He earns a doctorate in Education with a thesis on aggressiveness. He publishes a new book Agressivité utile ou dangereuse (Editions Tête de Feuilles) and participates in the production of five films on painless childbirth.

During 1975–1984: He meets Pierre Soulages, a French painter who encourages him to show his own paintings in Paris. Reviews will say "a new baroque has arrived". Then Jean Fourton will exhibit his paintings, sculptures and tapestries throughout the world. In this field he invents the art of stained glass window associated with Aubusson tapestries, the "vitraux-tapisseries" (registered trademark and model) for the Mémorial des Déportations au Margeleix, in Puy-Malsignat and for the 12th-century chapel of Domeyrot in the Creuse department with an homage to Leonardo da Vinci. He obtains orders from French Government. Some of his works are in the Musée départemental de la Tapisserie d'Aubusson and in the Musée de la Franc-Maçonnerie in Paris.

In 1984 he discovers in Vienna the first book own by Sigmund Freud when he was a child. This book is important as it was the foundation of Freud works concerning interpretation of dreams. He publishes L'amour de la psychanalyse (Editions Souny).

Since 1970 he has given lectures in several universities, and in 2000 published fifteen of them under the general title of Surfaces à émouvoir (Ed. Clef)

In 2001, for his contribution to culture, after nomination by the French Prime Minister Lionel Jospin, Jacques Chirac who was the President of France, awards Jean Fourton with the Ordre National du Mérite which is one of the three main distinctions in France.

Jean Fourton discovered that Sigmund Freud was a Freemason, and that nobody knew it. This is a discovery of interest for the history and daily clinical practice of psychoanalysis as it puts a new light on work and life of the creator of psychoanalysis. To fill in of a missing page in Freud's biography, he publishes in 2012 the first book on the subject which is now a reference: Freud franc-maçon (Editions Souny) soon to be published in English.

== Some publications ==
- Agressivité utile ou dangereuse, Éditions Tête de Feuilles, 1972 (in French)
- L'Amour de la psychanalyse, Éditions Lucien Souny, 1984 (in French)
- Surfaces à émouvoir, Éditions Clef, 2000 (in French)
- Freud franc-maçon, Éditions Lucien Souny, 2012 (in French)
