= Paul Madeline =

French painter (1863–1920)

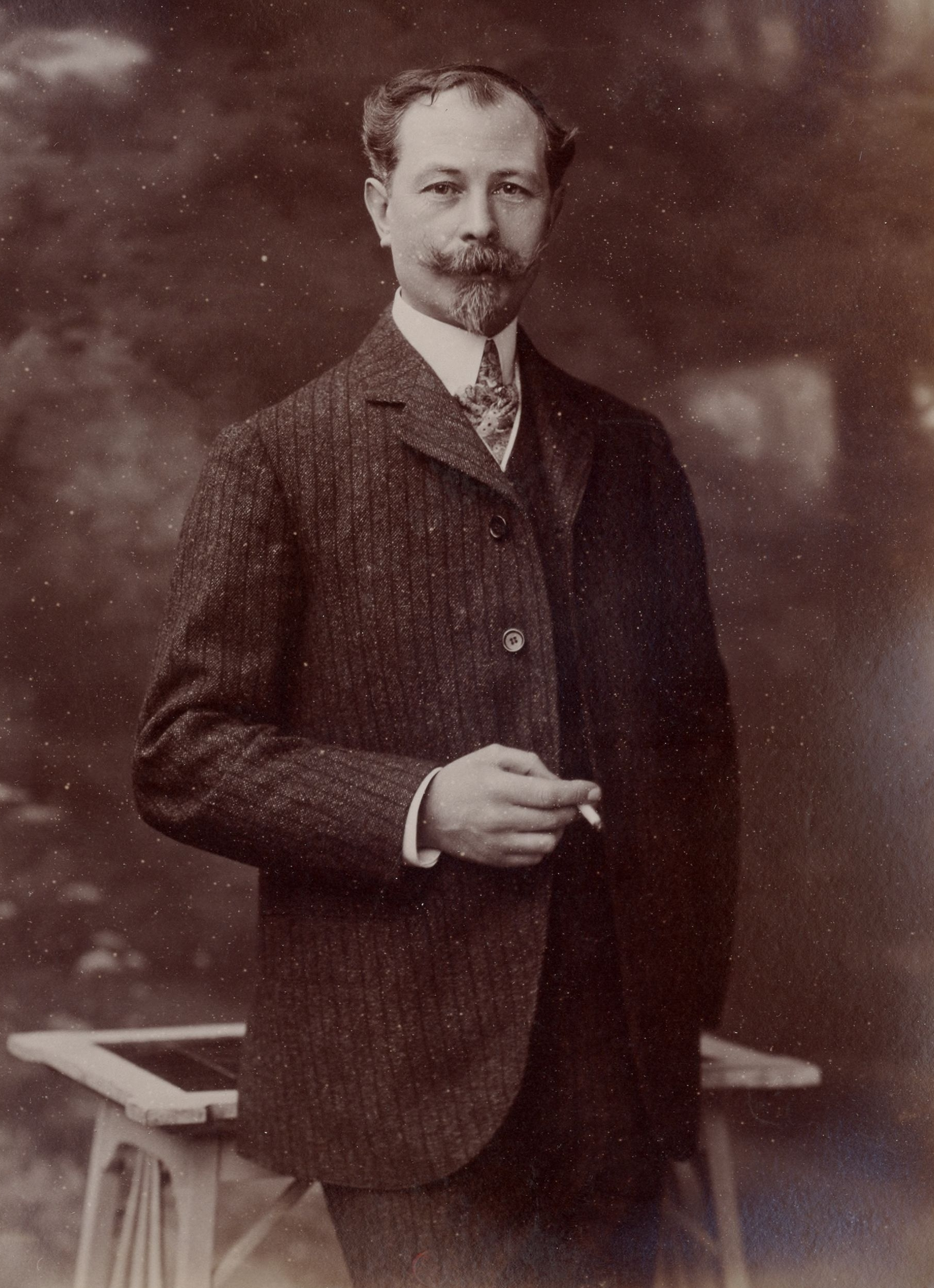
Paul Madeline; photograph by Nadar

Paul Madeline (7 October 1863, in Paris – 12 February 1920, in Paris) was a French Post-Impressionist painter; known for his landscapes and village scenes.

== Biography ==
He studied at the École des Beaux-Arts de Paris. He found it necessary to work at a publishing company to support his studies there, so most of his painting had to be done in his spare time.

In 1894, he met Maurice Rollinat and Léon Detroy (1857-1955), during dinner at a friend's house. Thanks to them, he was introduced to the countryside in Creuse. He immediately became enamored of the area, and returned there to paint for several months every year; usually in autumn. He eventually became one of the best known among the artists who worked there.

Some time later, he began to exhibit regularly at the Salon. He was also a member of the "Salon de la Nationale des Beaux-Arts" and the Salon d'Automne.

By 1902, his successes had enabled to live entirely from the income created by his art. In 1908, he helped co-found "La Société Moderne", whose members included Henri Lebasque, Jean-François Raffaëlli, Edmond Aman-Jean and Maurice Chabas. In the early 1910s, he travelled throughout Brittany.

During World War I, he was mobilized as a war artist, but the works he created in that capacity are little remembered.

In 1926, the Salon des Indépendants presented a major retrospective of his works.

== Selected works ==
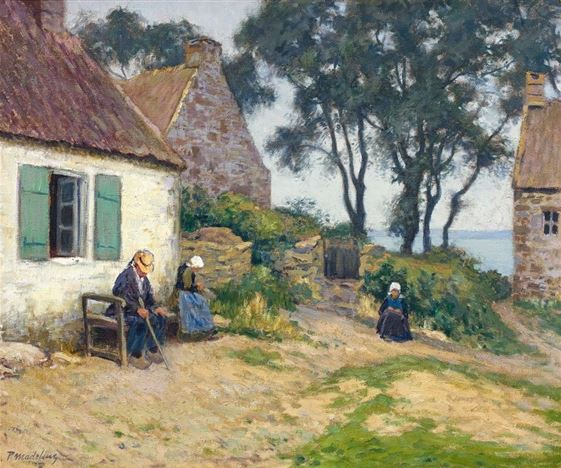
Village Scene with
Couple and Child

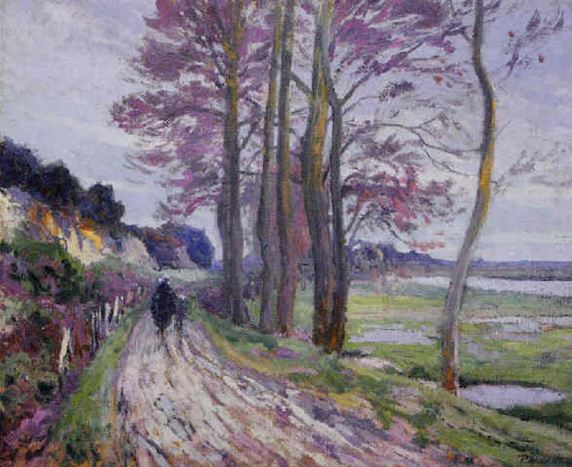
On the Road

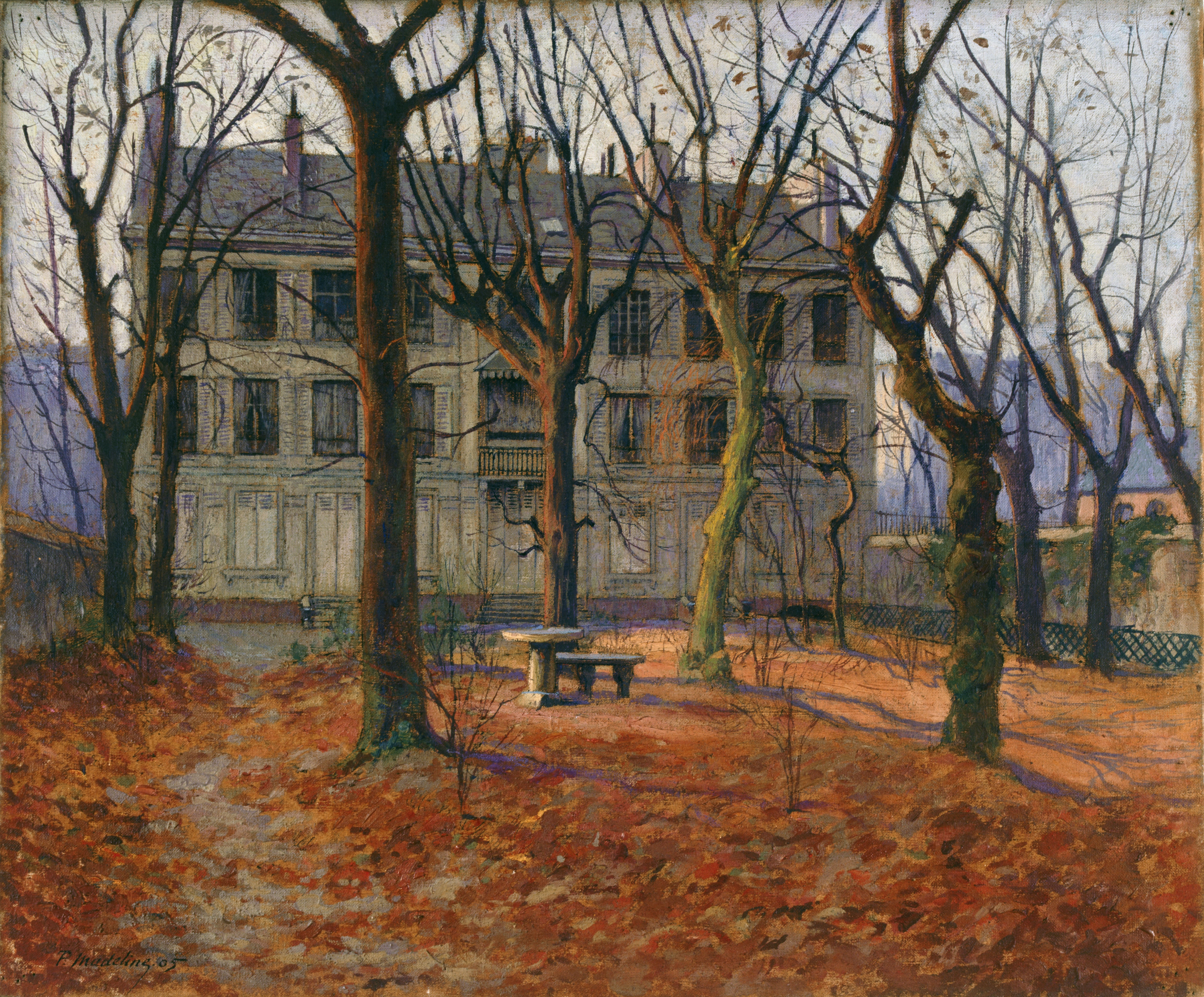
Maison de Victor Hugo

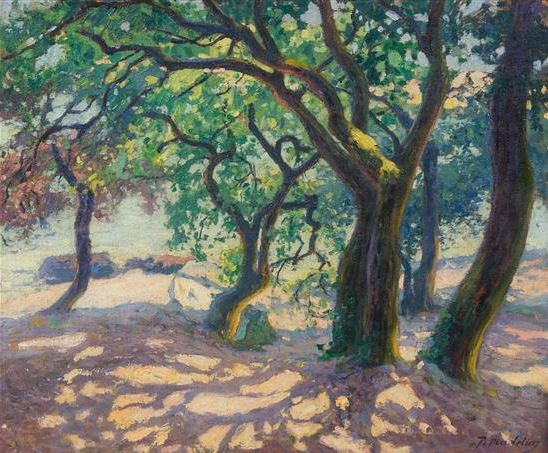
Green Oaks

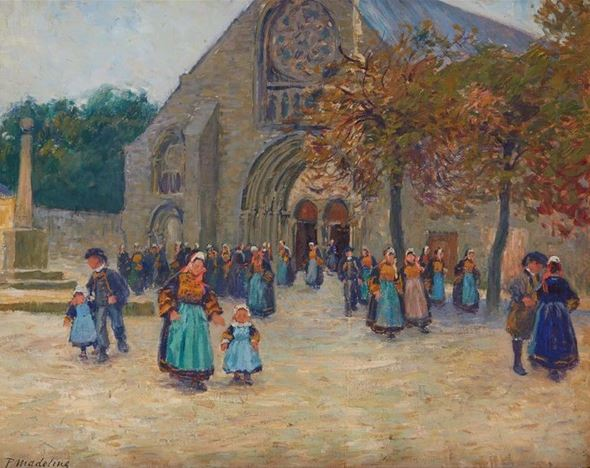
Leaving Church in Brittany
