= Lac Chambon =

Volcanic lake in Puy-de-Dôme, France

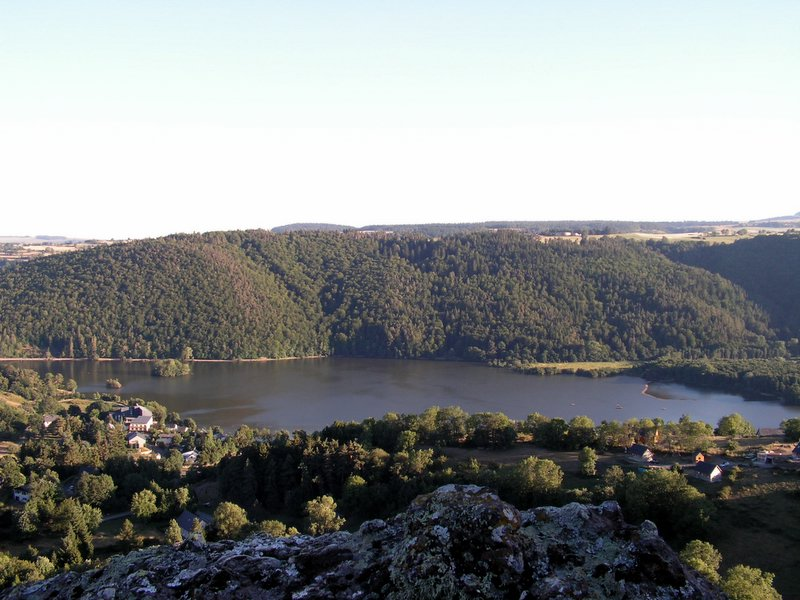

- Location within France
- Location: Puy-de-Dôme
- Coordinates: 45°34′13″N 2°55′18″E
- Primary outflows: Couze Chambon
- Basin countries: France
- Surface area: 0.6 km^{2} (0.23 sq mi)
- Max. depth: 4 m (13 ft)
- Surface elevation: 877 m (2,877 ft)

Lac Chambon is a lake in Puy-de-Dôme, France. At an elevation of 877 m, its surface area is 0.6 km².
