= Éguzon Dam =

Dam in France

Coordinates: 46°27′15″N 1°36′45″E

The Éguzon dam is a hydroelectric dam on the river Creuse in central France. Construction took place from 1922 to 1926 and, at the time, was the largest dam in Europe.

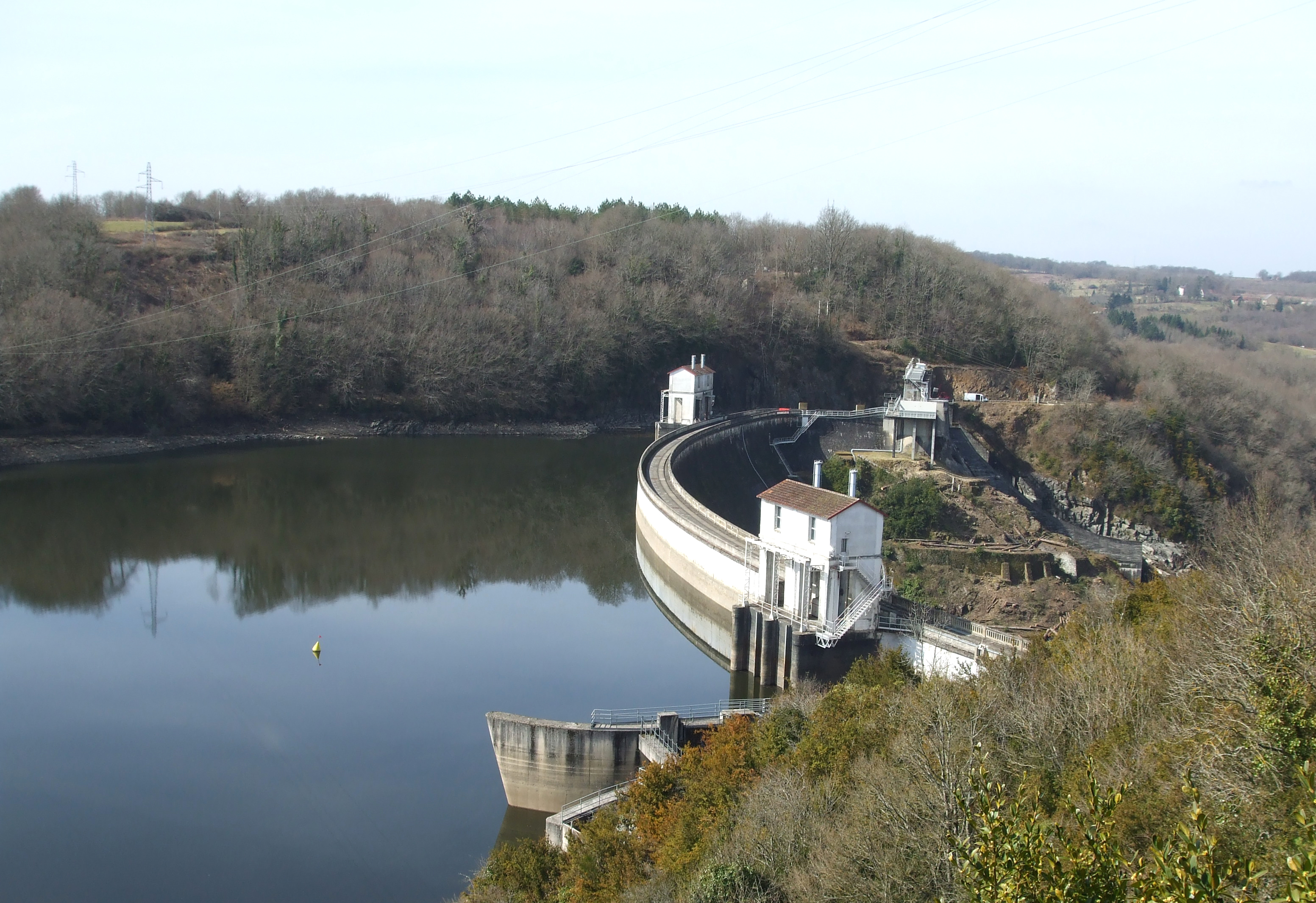
Éguzon Dam

The dam is 61 metres high and 300 metres across, with the thickness varying from 54 metres at the base to 5 metres at the top. The water behind the dam creates the Chambon Lake which, at 312 hectares, is the largest body of water in the region, and is popular with watersports enthusiasts.

Electricity generation is via six valves, with a power of 12 MW each, giving an annual electricity production of 101 million kWh.

== See also ==
- Renewable energy in France
