= Lac du Chambon =

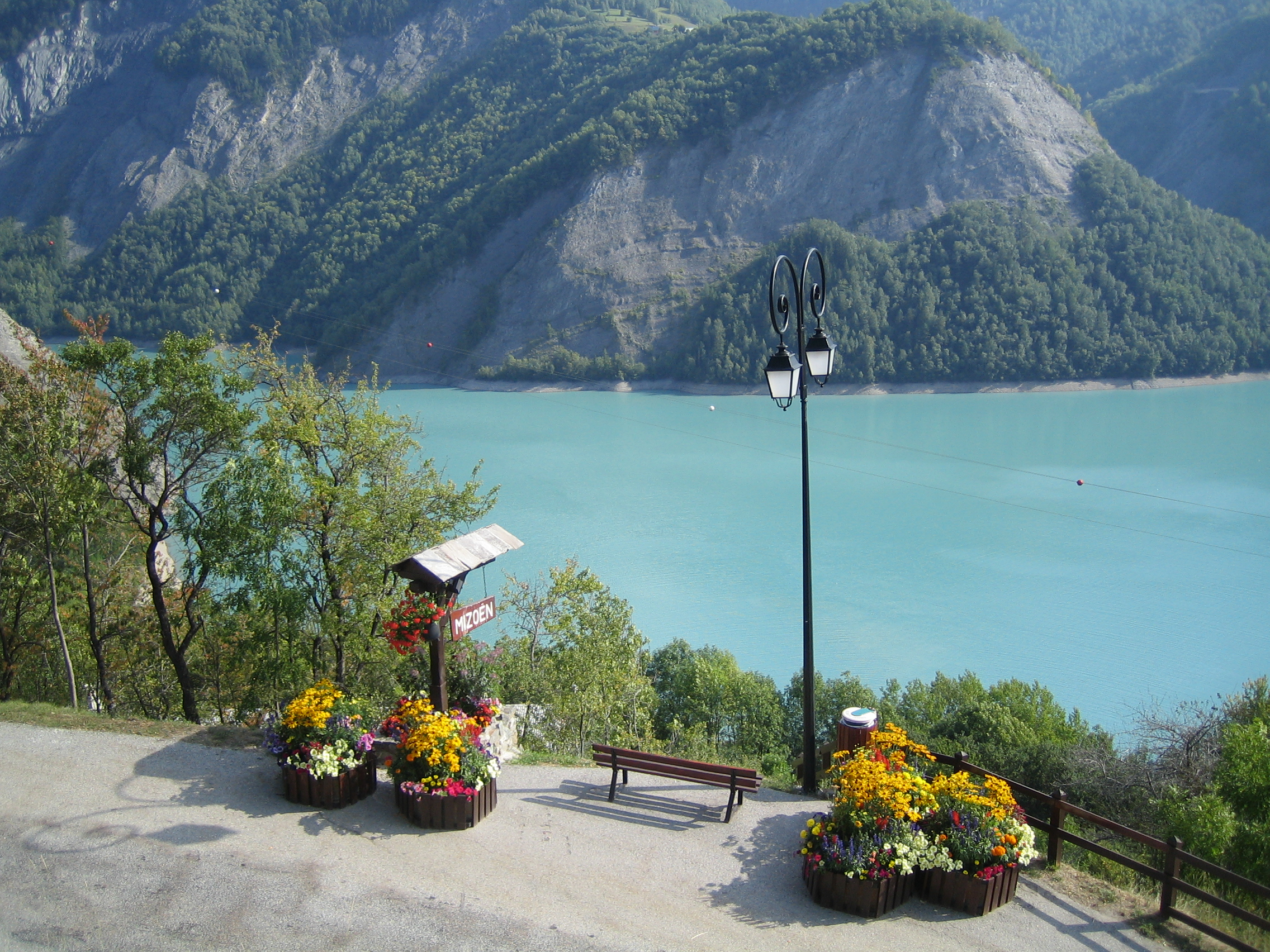

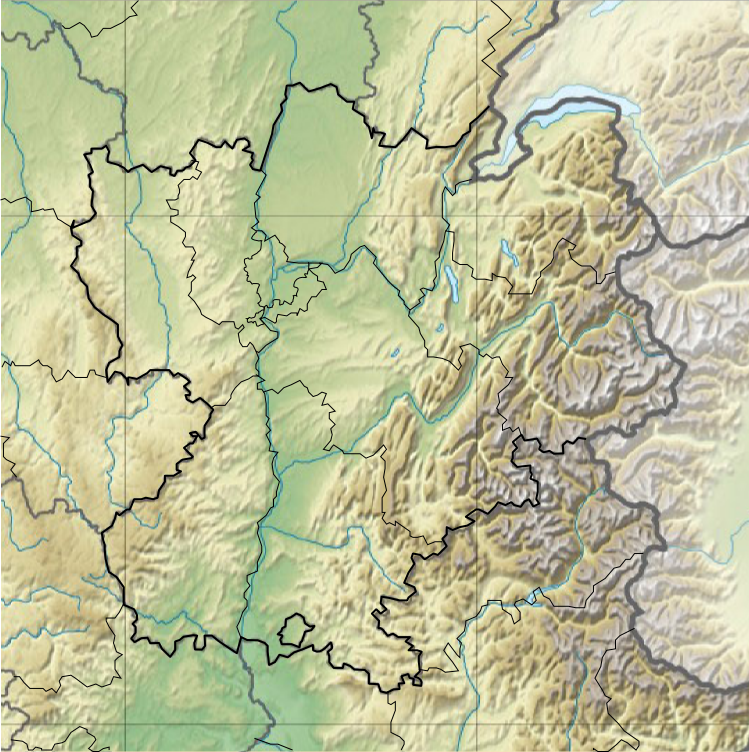
- Location within Rhône-Alpes
- Location: Isère, Rhône-Alpes
- Coordinates: 45.042°N 6.148°E
- Type: reservoir
- Primary inflows: Romanche
- Primary outflows: Romanche
- Basin countries: France
- Surface area: 1.4 km^{2} (0.54 sq mi)
- Max. depth: 40 m (130 ft)
- Water volume: 54,000,000 m^{3} (1.9×10^{9} cu ft)
- Surface elevation: 1,040 m (3,410 ft)

Lac du Chambon (French pronunciation: [lak dy ʃɑ̃bɔ̃]) is a reservoir created in 1934 on the Romanche river in Isère, Rhône-Alpes, France. At an elevation of 1040 m, its surface area is 1.4 km^{2}.
