= Jean-Pierre Graff Trophy =

French ice hockey rookie of the year

The Jean-Pierre Graff Trophy (French: Trophée Jean-Pierre Graff) is an award in the Ligue Magnus, the top professional ice hockey league in France, given to the most promising player in the league. The Trophy was first awarded in 1981 and has been presented ever year except 1989, when there was no recipient.

== Winners ==
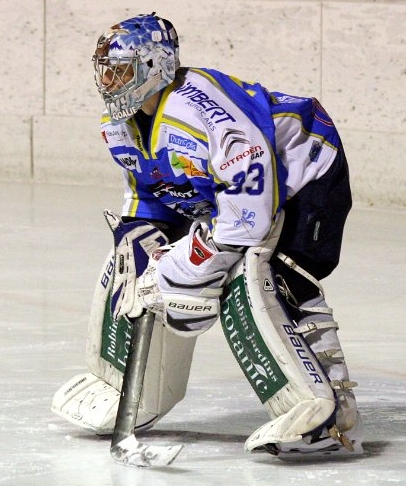
Ronan Quemener, winner in 2010

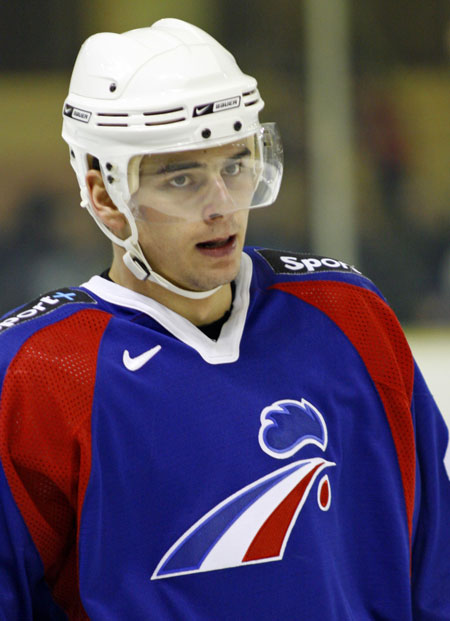
Sacha Treille, winner in 2007

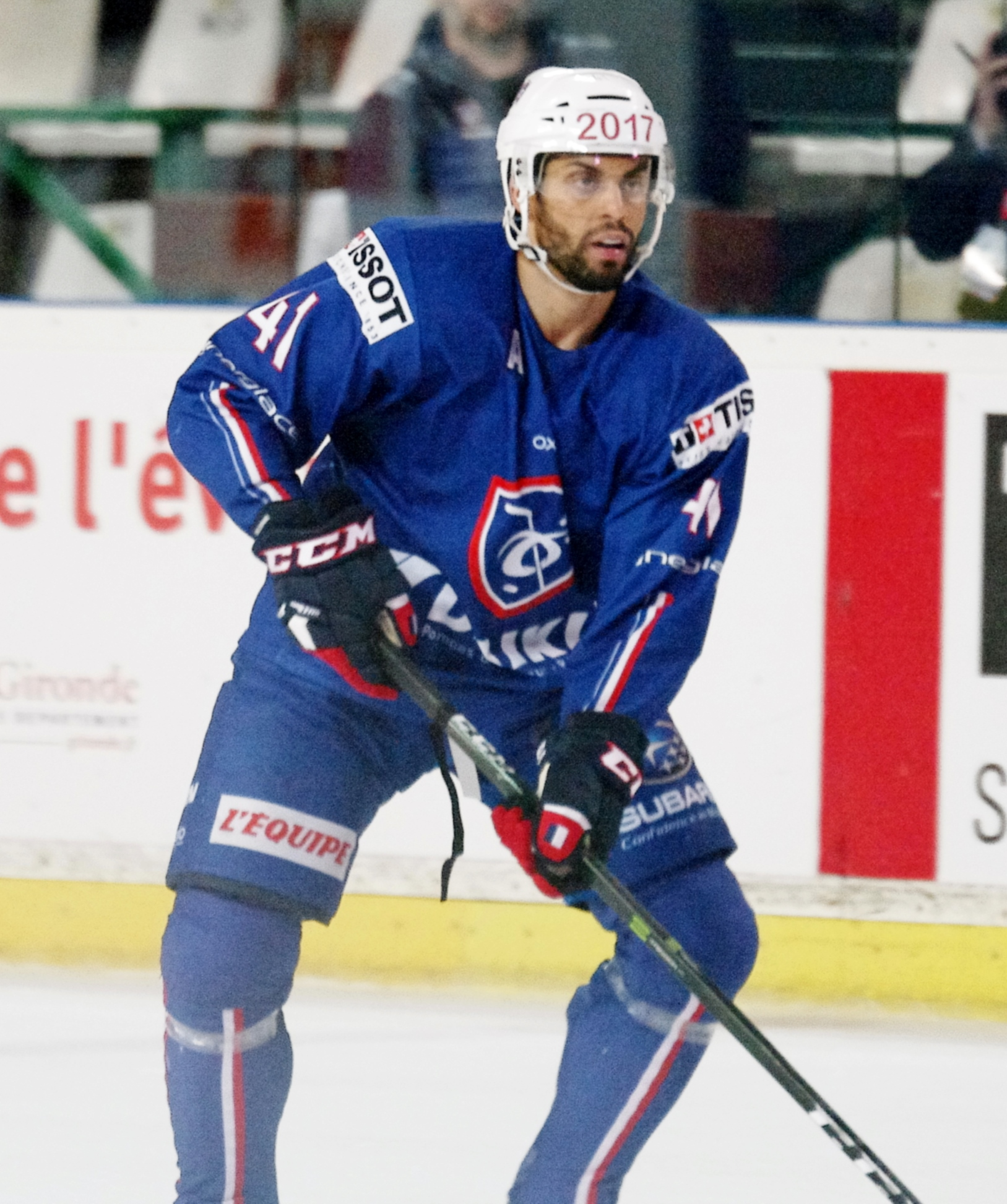
Pierre-Édouard Bellemare, winner in 2005

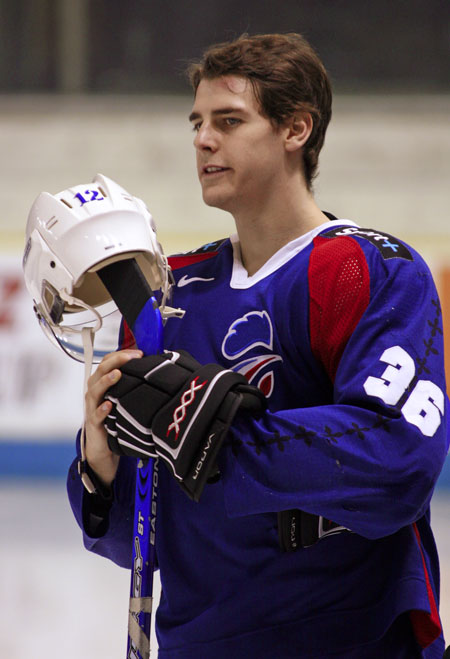
Kévin Hecquefeuille, winner in 2003

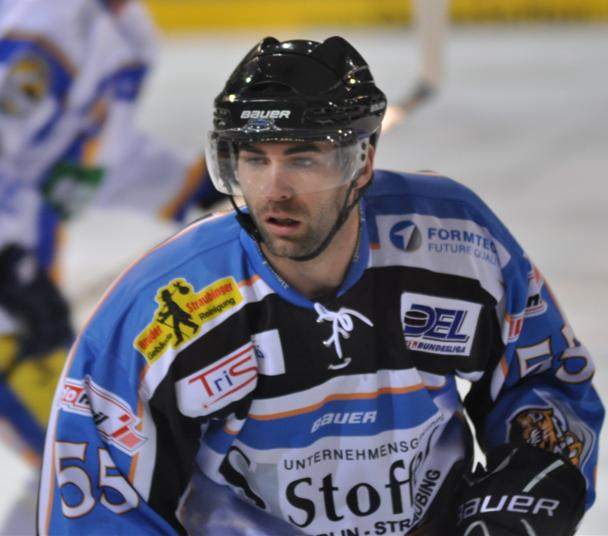
Laurent Meunier, winner in 1998

Season	Player	Team
2025–26	Matias Bachelet	Brûleurs de Loups de Grenoble
2024–25	Enzo Carry	Boxers de Bordeaux
2023–24	Quentin Tomasino	Dragons de Rouen
2022–23	Dylan Fabre	Brûleurs de Loups de Grenoble
2021–22	Tomas Simonsen	Gothiques d'Amiens
2020–21	Jules Boscq	Anglet Hormadi Élite
2019–20	Quentin Papillon	Scorpions de Mulhouse
2018–19	Hugo Gallet	Boxers de Bordeaux
2017–18	Valérian Mathieu; Rudy Matima	Étoile Noire de Strasbourg; Gothiques d'Amiens
2016–17	Alexandre Texier	Brûleurs de Loups de Grenoble
2015–16	Maurin Bouvet	Rapaces de Gap
2014–15	Jordann Perret; Fabien Kazarine	Brûleurs de Loups de Grenoble; Gothiques d'Amiens
2013–14	Antoine Bonvalot	Brûleurs de Loups de Grenoble
2012–13	Nicolas Ritz	Ducs de Dijon
2011–12	Anthony Rech	Dragons de Rouen
2010–11	Loïc Lampérier	Diables Rouges de Briançon
2009–10	Ronan Quemener	Rapaces de Gap
2008–09	Anthony Guttig	Ducs de Dijon
2007–08	Henri-Corentin Buysse	Gothiques d'Amiens
2006–07	Sacha Treille	Brûleurs de Loups de Grenoble
2005–06	Damien Fleury	Drakkars de Caen
2004–05	Pierre-Édouard Bellemare	Dragons de Rouen
2003–04	Christophe Tartari	Brûleurs de Loups de Grenoble
2002–03	Kévin Hecquefeuille	Gothiques d'Amiens
2001–02	Xavier Daramy	Orques d'Anglet
2000–01	Romain Carrara	Flammes Bleues de Reims
1999–00	Brice Chauvel	Léopards de Caen
1998–99	Yven Sadoun	Jets de Viry-Essonne
1997–98	Laurent Meunier	Lions de Lyon
1996–97	Laurent Gras	Gothiques d'Amiens
1995–96	François Rozenthal	Flammes Bleues de Reims
1994–95	Maurice Rozenthal	Flammes Bleues de Reims
1993–94	Benjamin Agnel; Stéphane Arcangeloni	Brûleurs de Loups de Grenoble
1992–93	Karl Dewolf	Diables Rouges de Valenciennes
1991–92	Lionel Orsolini	Huskies de Chamonix
1990–91	Mickaël Babin	Dragons de Rouen
1989–90	Stéphane Barin	Brûleurs de Loups de Grenoble
1988–89	Not awarded	
1987–88	Georges Roul	Diables Rouges de Briançon
1986–87	François Dusseau	Gothiques d'Amiens
1985–86	Pierre Pousse	Saint-Gervais
1984–85	Serge Djelloul	Megève
1983–84	Philippe Bozon	Megève
1982–83	Laurent Lecomte	Jets de Viry-Essonne
1981–82	Christophe Ville	Saint-Gervais
1980–81	Aram Kevorkian	Jets de Viry-Essonne
