= Marcel Claret Trophy =

French Ice Hockey Award

The Marcel Claret Trophy (French: Trophée Marcel Claret) has been awarded to the most sportsmanlike team in the Ligue Magnus since 1981. The team with the fewest penalties during the regular season wins the trophy.

== Winners ==
- 1980–81 : Villard-de-Lans
- 1981–82 : Lyon
- 1982–83 : Briançon
- 1983–84 : Briançon
- 1984–85 : Villard-de-Lans
- 1985–86 : Villard-de-Lans
- 1986–87 : Mont-Blanc
- 1987–88 : Mont Blanc
- 1988–89 : Mont Blanc
- 1989–90 : Caen
- 1990–91 : Amiens
- 1991–92 : Viry
- 1992–93 : Rouen
- 1993–94 : Rouen
- 1994–95 : Rouen
- 1995–96 : Amiens
- 1996–97 : Amiens
- 1997–98 : Viry
- 1998–99 : Not awarded
- 1999–00 : Amiens
- 2000–01 : Rouen
- 2001–02 : Amiens
- 2002–03 : Dijon
- 2003–04 : Villard-de-Lans
- 2004–05 : Villard-de-Lans
- 2005–06 : Chamonix
- 2006–07 : Chamonix
- 2007–08 : Villard-de-Lans
- 2008–09 : Épinal
- 2009–10 : Briançon
- 2010–11 : Briançon
- 2011–12 : Gap
- 2012–13 : Gap
- 2013–14 : Dijon
- 2014–15 : Gap
- 2015–16 : Chamonix
- 2016–17 : Nice
- 2017–18 : Amiens
- 2018–19 : Amiens
- 2019–20 : Amiens
- 2020–21 : Amiens
- 2021–22 : Angers
- 2022–23 : Nice
- 2023–24 : Nice
- 2024–25 : Marseille
- 2025–26 : Rouen
