= Anthony Mortas =

French ice hockey player

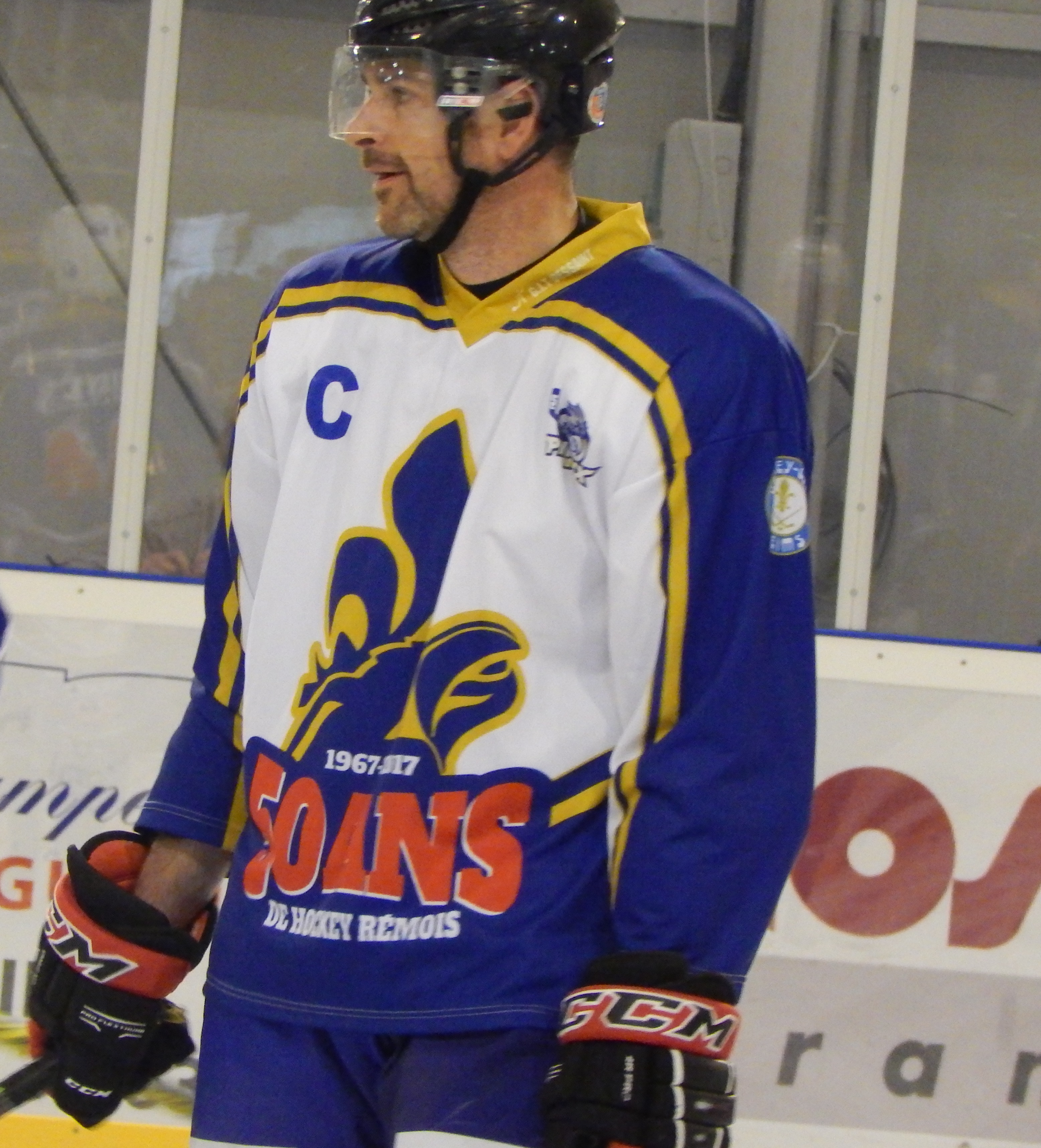
- Anthony Mortas in 2018
- Born: 13 February 1974 (age 52) Reims, France
- Height: 6 ft 0 in (183 cm)
- Weight: 190 lb (86 kg; 13 st 8 lb)
- Position: Center
- Shot: Left
- Played for: Hockey Club de Reims; Gothiques d'Amiens
- NHL draft: Undrafted
- Playing career: 1991–2017

Anthony Mortas (born 13 February 1974) is a French ice hockey player. He competed in the men's tournaments at the 1998 Winter Olympics and the 2002 Winter Olympics.

Since 2023, He has been the head coach of the FFHG Division 1 team Pingouins de Morzine-Avoriaz.

== Career statistics ==
=== Regular season and playoffs ===
			Regular season					Playoffs
Season	Team	League	GP	G	A	Pts	PIM	GP	G	A	Pts	PIM
1991–92	Hockey Club de Reims	France	4	0	0	0	0	—	—	—	—	—
1992–93	Hockey Club de Reims	France	33	13	19	32	31	—	—	—	—	—
1993–94	Hockey Club de Reims	FRA.2	15	5	10	15	0	—	—	—	—	—
1994–95	Hockey Club de Reims	France	27	5	4	9	26	—	—	—	—	—
1995–96	Hockey Club de Reims	France	27	9	7	16	12	—	—	—	—	—
1996–97	Hockey Club de Reims	France	30	9	17	26	47	—	—	—	—	—
1997–98	Hockey Club de Reims	France	39	17	14	31	28	—	—	—	—	—
1998–99	Hockey Club de Reims	France	45	16	18	34	32	—	—	—	—	—
1999–2000	Hockey Club de Reims	France	41	14	29	43	35	—	—	—	—	—
2000–01	Hockey Club de Reims	France	27	15	18	33	—	11	6	5	11	—
2001–02	Hockey Club de Reims	France	—	13	26	39	—	—	—	—	—	—
2002–03	Gothiques d'Amiens	France	35	10	27	37	16	—	—	—	—	—
2003–04	Gothiques d'Amiens	France	26	10	17	27	24	10	2	5	7	2
2004–05	Gothiques d'Amiens	France	28	6	17	23	18	5	1	3	4	4
2005–06	Gothiques d'Amiens	France	25	6	16	22	39	10	4	4	8	12
2006–07	Gothiques d'Amiens	France	24	7	15	22	44	5	1	3	4	4
2007–08	Gothiques d'Amiens	France	26	6	14	20	38	3	0	1	1	4
2008–09	Gothiques d'Amiens	France	22	12	22	34	12	—	—	—	—	—
2009–10	Gothiques d'Amiens	France	22	14	19	33	28	4	1	1	2	6
2010–11	Gothiques d'Amiens	France	26	9	21	30	18	9	3	5	8	2
2011–12	Gothiques d'Amiens	France	26	1	15	16	16	10	2	3	5	8
2016–17	Gothiques d'Amiens II	FRA.4	1	0	3	3	2	—	—	—	—	—
France totals			533	179	309	488	464	67	21	32	53	42

- France totals do not include stats from the 2001–02 season.

=== International ===
Year	Team	Event	GP	G	A	Pts	PIM
1992	France	EJC B	5	2	2	4	2
1993	France	WJC B	7	4	3	7	2
1994	France	WJC B	7	3	1	4	2
1997	France	WC	8	0	0	0	0
1998	France	OG	4	0	1	1	0
1998	France	WC	3	0	0	0	0
1999	France	WC	3	0	0	0	4
2000	France	WC	6	0	0	0	0
2001	France	OGQ	3	0	0	0	2
2002	France	OG	4	0	1	1	2
2002	France	WC D1	5	1	4	5	0
2003	France	WC D1	5	3	2	5	4
2004	France	WC	6	1	0	1	2
2006	France	WC D1	5	1	0	1	4
Junior totals			19	9	6	15	6
Senior totals			52	6	8	14	18
