= Mathieu Mille =

French ice hockey defenceman

- Born: January 10, 1981 (age 45) Amiens, France
- Height: 6 ft 0 in (183 cm)
- Weight: 198 lb (90 kg; 14 st 2 lb)
- Position: Defence
- Shot: Left
- Played for: Gothiques d'Amiens; Anglet Hormadi Élite; Scorpions de Mulhouse; Corsaires de Dunkerque; Ducs de Dijon; Pingouins de Morzine-Avoriaz
- National team: France
- Playing career: 1998–2011

Mathieu Mille (born January 10, 1981) is a French former professional ice hockey defenceman.

Mille played in the Ligue Magnus for Gothiques d'Amiens, Anglet Hormadi Élite, Scorpions de Mulhouse, Corsaires de Dunkerque, Ducs de Dijon and Pingouins de Morzine-Avoriaz.

Mille also played in the 2008 and 2009 IIHF World Championship for France.

== Career statistics ==
			Regular season					Playoffs
Season	Team	League	GP	G	A	Pts	PIM	GP	G	A	Pts	PIM
1998–99	Gothiques d'Amiens	France	32	0	3	3	2	—	—	—	—	—
1999–00	Gothiques d'Amiens	France	38	0	0	0	5	—	—	—	—	—
2000–01	Gothiques d'Amiens	France	—	3	6	9	—	—	—	—	—	—
2001–02	Gothiques d'Amiens	France	—	0	4	4	—	—	—	—	—	—
2002–03	Anglet Hormadi Élite	France	26	2	4	6	28	—	—	—	—	—
2003–04	Scorpions de Mulhouse	France	28	1	6	7	26	5	0	2	2	2
2003–04	Corsaires de Dunkerque	France	2	1	1	2	6	—	—	—	—	—
2004–05	Ducs de Dijon	Ligue Magnus	25	2	5	7	40	5	1	2	3	8
2005–06	Pingouins de Morzine-Avoriaz	Ligue Magnus	24	0	10	10	20	2	1	0	1	0
2006–07	Pingouins de Morzine-Avoriaz	Ligue Magnus	25	2	2	4	36	12	2	1	3	10
2007–08	Pingouins de Morzine-Avoriaz	Ligue Magnus	23	2	6	8	57	7	0	0	0	2
2008–09	Pingouins de Morzine-Avoriaz	Ligue Magnus	26	4	14	18	56	6	1	1	2	6
2009–10	Ducs de Dijon	Ligue Magnus	25	2	5	7	28	3	0	0	0	7
2010–11	Wasquehal	France3	16	1	13	14	56	2	0	0	0	16
France/Ligue Magnus totals			274	19	66	85	304	40	5	6	11	35
