= Maurice Rozenthal =

French ice hockey player

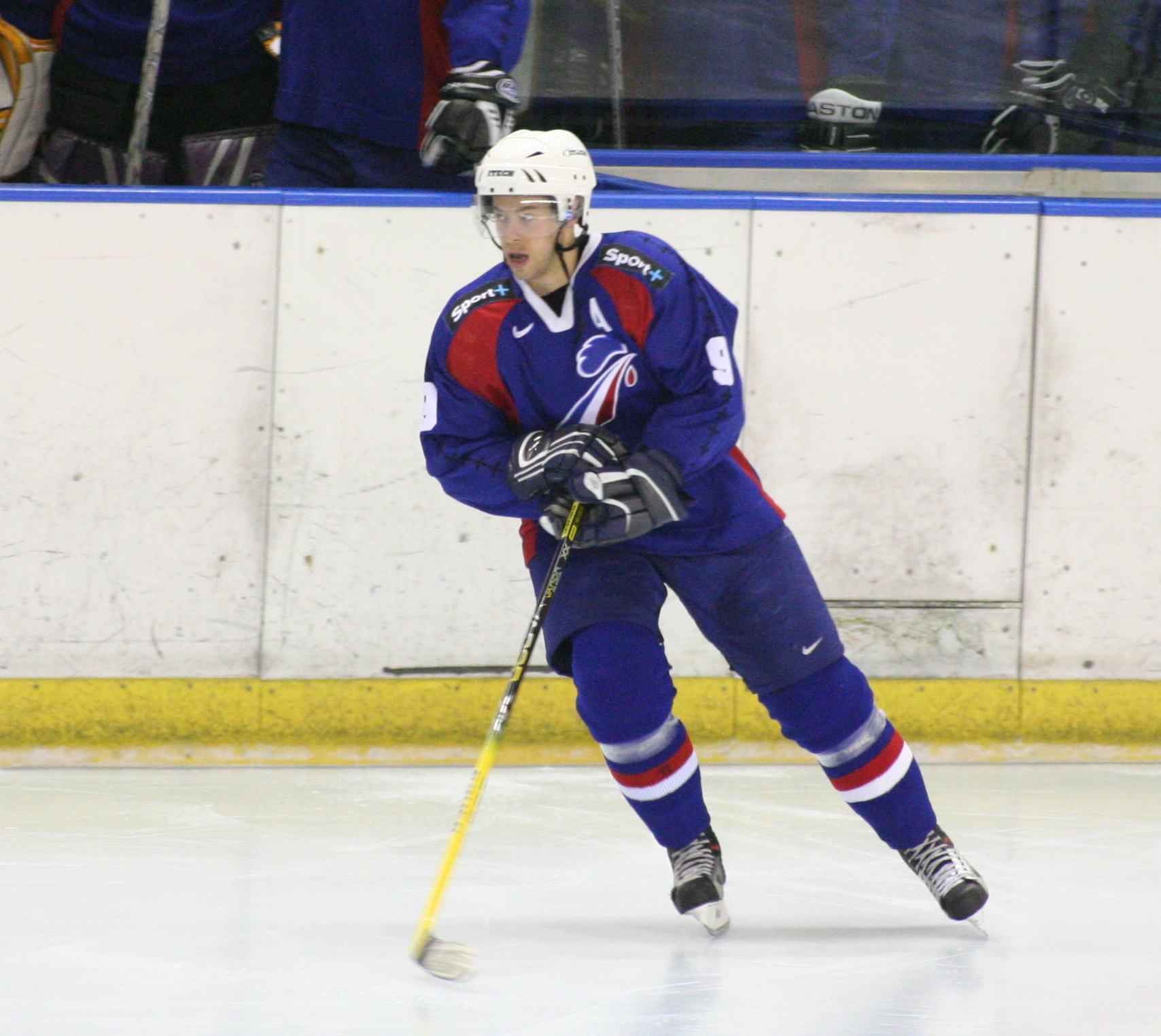
- Rozenthal; 2006
- Born: 20 June 1975 (age 51) Dunkirk, France
- Height: 5 ft 10 in (178 cm)
- Weight: 174 lb (79 kg; 12 st 6 lb)
- Position: Centre
- Shot: Right
- Played for: Hockey Club de Reims; LHC Les Lions; Gothiques d'Amiens; IF Björklöven; Dragons de Rouen; Leksands IF; Scorpions de Mulhouse; Ours de Villard-de-Lans; Pingouins de Morzine-Avoriaz
- National team: France
- Playing career: 1994–2013

Maurice Rozenthal (born 20 June 1975) is a French former professional ice hockey player.

== Personal ==
Rozenthal is Jewish, and is the identical twin brother of François Rozenthal, who is also a French ice hockey player.

== Ice hockey career ==
He has been affiliated with Gothiques d'Amiens, in Amiens, France, and IF Björklöven, in Umeå, Sweden.

Rozenthal participated for France in ice hockey, playing on the France men's national ice hockey team, in both the 1998 Winter Olympics in Nagano, and the 2002 Winter Olympics in Salt Lake City.

=== Awards ===
- 1994–95: French League Best Young Player "Jean-Pierre Graff Trophy"
- 1994–95, 1998–99, 1999–2000, 2000–01, 2005–06: French League Best French Player "Albert Hassler Trophy"
- 2004–08: French All-Star Team

== Career statistics ==
=== Regular season and playoffs ===
			Regular season					Playoffs
Season	Team	League	GP	G	A	Pts	PIM	GP	G	A	Pts	PIM
1992–93	Corsaires de Dunkerque	FRA.2	16	11	10	21	10	—	—	—	—	—
1993–94	Corsaires de Dunkerque	FRA.2	17	15	11	26	10	—	—	—	—	—
1994–95	Hockey Club de Reims	FRA	19	13	14	27	4	—	—	—	—	—
1995–96	Hockey Club de Reims	FRA	24	10	13	23	10	—	—	—	—	—
1996–97	LHC Les Lions	FRA	31	20	28	48	69	—	—	—	—	—
1997–98	Gothiques d'Amiens	FRA	39	15	21	36	54	—	—	—	—	—
1998–99	Gothiques d'Amiens	FRA	45	27	37	64	34	—	—	—	—	—
1999–2000	Gothiques d'Amiens	FRA	40	27	18	45	27	—	—	—	—	—
2000–01	Gothiques d'Amiens	FRA		21	18	39		—	—	—	—	—
2001–02	IF Björklöven	Allsv	44	19	18	37	50	8	0	4	4	10
2002–03	IF Björklöven	Allsv	40	12	17	29	28	3	0	0	0	6
2003–04	Dragons de Rouen	FRA	14	9	16	25	6	—	—	—	—	—
2003–04	Leksands IF	SEL	10	0	1	1	2	—	—	—	—	—
2004–05	Scorpions de Mulhouse	FRA	26	12	11	23	34	10	8	5	13	8
2005–06	Ours de Villard–de–Lans	FRA	25	18	11	29	38	3	2	2	4	4
2006–07	Ours de Villard–de–Lans	FRA	24	13	15	28	34	5	1	0	1	8
2007–08	Pingouins de Morzine–Avoriaz	FRA	25	11	22	33	78	6	3	3	6	10
2008–09	Pingouins de Morzine–Avoriaz	FRA	26	9	25	34	38	6	1	1	2	14
2009–10	Toulouse Blagnac HC	FRA.3	15	25	15	40	60	8	4	12	16	12
2010–11	Toulouse Blagnac HC	FRA.2	24	16	22	38	45	—	—	—	—	—
2011–12	Corsaires de Dunkerque	FRA.2	25	11	25	36	34	—	—	—	—	—
2012–13	Corsaires de Dunkerque	FRA.2	24	21	16	37	52	3	1	0	1	12
FRA totals			338	184	231	315	426	30	12	14	26	44

- FRA totals do not include stats from the 2000–01 season.

=== International ===
Year	Team	Event	GP	G	A	Pts	PIM
1992	France	EJC B	5	6	6	12	2
1994	France	WJC B	7	3	3	6	4
1995	France	WJC B	7	2	3	5	4
1996	France	WC	7	0	2	2	0
1997	France	WC	8	0	1	1	2
1998	France	OG	4	0	0	0	6
1998	France	WC	3	0	0	0	0
1999	France	WC	3	0	1	1	2
1999	France	WC Q	3	2	1	3	2
2000	France	WC	6	3	5	8	8
2001	France	OGQ	3	1	2	3	2
2001	France	WC D1	5	1	2	3	2
2002	France	OG	4	4	1	5	2
2002	France	WC D1	5	5	4	9	2
2004	France	WC	6	1	0	1	6
2005	France	OGQ	6	1	5	6	4
2005	France	WC D1	5	2	1	3	0
2006	France	WC D1	5	1	2	3	2
Junior totals			19	11	12	23	10
Senior totals			73	21	27	48	40

== See also ==
- List of select Jewish ice hockey players
