= François Rozenthal =

French ice hockey player

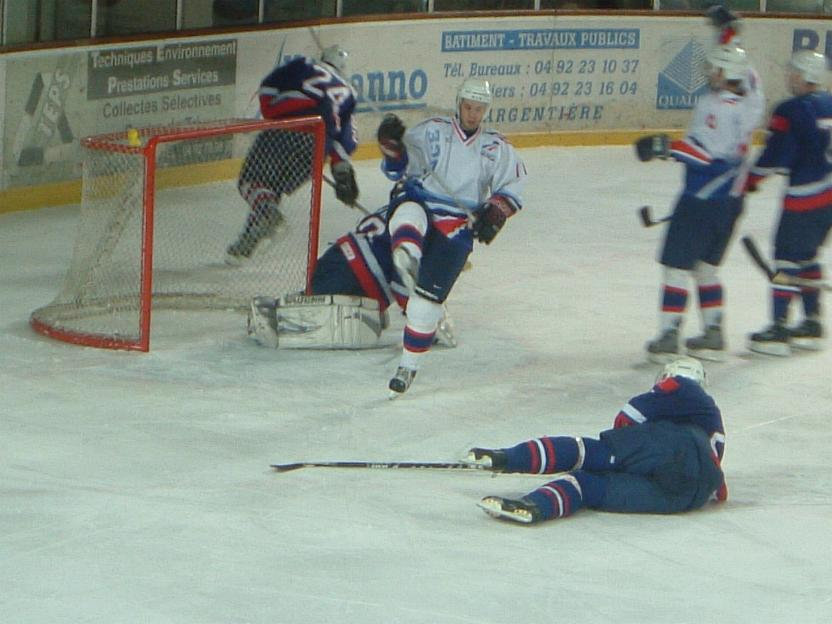
- Rozenthal, at the 2003 Euro Ice Hockey Challenge
- Born: 20 June 1975 (age 51) Dunkirk, France
- Height: 5 ft 10 in (178 cm)
- Weight: 170 lb (77 kg; 12 st 2 lb)
- Position: Right Wing
- Shot: Right
- Played for: Hockey Club de Reims; LHC Les Lions; Gothiques d'Amiens; IF Björklöven; Pingouins de Morzine-Avoriaz
- National team: France
- Playing career: 1994–2013

François Rozenthal (born 20 June 1975) is a French former professional ice hockey player.

== Personal ==
Rozenthal is Jewish, and is the identical twin brother of Maurice Rozenthal, who is also a French ice hockey player.

== Ice hockey career ==
He has been affiliated with Gothiques d'Amiens, in Amiens, France, and IF Björklöven, in Umeå, Sweden.

Rozenthal participated for France in ice hockey, playing on the France men's national ice hockey team, in both the 1998 Winter Olympics in Nagano, and the 2002 Winter Olympics in Salt Lake City.

In 2006, he represented France against Great Britain in the World Championship, Division One.

=== Awards ===
- 1995–9: French League Best Young Player "Jean-Pierre Graff Trophy"
- 2003–04: French League Most Points "Charles Ramsey Trophy" (40)
- 2004–09: French All-Star Team

== See also ==
- List of select Jewish ice hockey players

== Career statistics ==
=== Regular season and playoffs ===
			Regular season					Playoffs
Season	Team	League	GP	G	A	Pts	PIM	GP	G	A	Pts	PIM
1992–93	Corsaires de Dunkerque	FRA.2	16	9	6	15	8	—	—	—	—	—
1993–94	Corsaires de Dunkerque	FRA.2	18	11	13	24	10	—	—	—	—	—
1994–95	Hockey Club de Reims	FRA	14	5	5	10	6	—	—	—	—	—
1995–96	Hockey Club de Reims	FRA	28	8	7	15	12	—	—	—	—	—
1996–97	LHC Les Lions	FRA	23	15	9	24	10	—	—	—	—	—
1997–98	Gothiques d'Amiens	FRA	32	14	13	27	24	—	—	—	—	—
1998–99	Gothiques d'Amiens	FRA	32	16	13	29	18	—	—	—	—	—
1999–2000	Gothiques d'Amiens	FRA	21	7	4	11	12	—	—	—	—	—
2000–01	Gothiques d'Amiens	FRA		11	13	24		—	—	—	—	—
2001–02	IF Björklöven	Allsv	44	11	11	22	18	8	4	0	4	0
2002–03	Gothiques d'Amiens	FRA	34	20	22	42	20	—	—	—	—	—
2003–04	Gothiques d'Amiens	FRA	26	22	18	40	24	8	6	3	9	2
2004–05	Gothiques d'Amiens	FRA	27	20	12	32	59	5	1	0	1	2
2005–06	Gothiques d'Amiens	FRA	19	7	6	13	10	10	3	7	10	16
2006–07	Gothiques d'Amiens	FRA	26	8	10	18	46	5	4	2	6	4
2007–08	Pingouins de Morzine–Avoriaz	FRA	19	15	8	23	26	7	8	7	15	4
2008–09	Pingouins de Morzine–Avoriaz	FRA	25	18	20	38	45	5	0	3	3	0
2009–10	Corsaires de Dunkerque	FRA.3	18	27	20	47	32	2	3	3	6	2
2010–11	Corsaires de Dunkerque	FRA.3	17	13	29	42	30	8	10	15	25	10
2011–12	Corsaires de Dunkerque	FRA.2	20	14	19	33	16	—	—	—	—	—
2012–13	Corsaires de Dunkerque	FRA.2	22	5	8	13	16	3	1	0	1	6
FRA totals			326	175	147	322	312	40	22	22	44	28

- FRA totals do not include stats from the 2000–01 season.

=== International ===
Year	Team	Event	GP	G	A	Pts	PIM
1992	France	EJC B	5	3	6	9	0
1993	France	EJC B	7	5	2	7	16
1994	France	WJC B	7	6	0	6	2
1996	France	WC	7	4	1	5	2
1998	France	OG	2	0	0	0	0
1998	France	WC	3	0	0	0	0
1999	France	WC	3	0	0	0	0
2000	France	WC	6	1	1	2	0
2001	France	OGQ	3	1	1	2	0
2001	France	WC D1	5	1	2	3	4
2002	France	OG	4	0	0	0	0
2002	France	WC D1	5	3	3	6	4
2003	France	WC D1	5	2	1	3	4
2004	France	WC	6	0	0	0	4
2005	France	OGQ	6	6	2	8	4
2005	France	WC D1	5	2	3	5	2
2006	France	WC D1	5	2	3	5	4
2007	France	WC D1	5	2	3	5	0
2008	France	WC	5	0	1	1	2
2009	France	OGQ	3	1	0	1	2
2009	France	WC	6	0	1	1	6
Junior totals			19	14	8	22	18
Senior totals			84	27	20	47	38
