= Baptiste Amar =

French ice hockey player

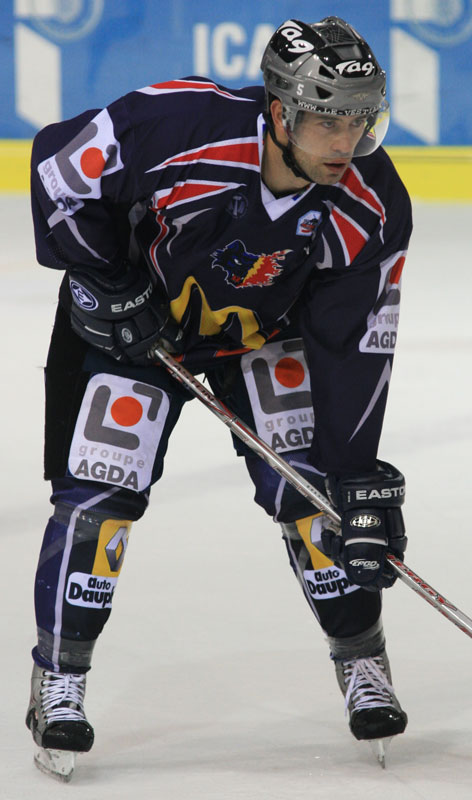
- Born: November 11, 1979 (age 46) Gap, France
- Height: 6 ft 0 in (183 cm)
- Weight: 192 lb (87 kg; 13 st 10 lb)
- Position: Defence
- Shot: Left
- Played for: Lions de Lyon; Dragons de Rouen; Brûleurs de Loups; Rögle BK
- National team: France
- Playing career: 1997–2014

Baptiste Amar (born November 11, 1979) is a French former professional ice hockey defenceman who participated at the 2010 IIHF World Championship as a member of the France National men's ice hockey team.

== International ==
Amar was named to the France men's national ice hockey team for competition at the 2014 IIHF World Championship.

== Career statistics ==
=== Regular season and playoffs ===
| | | | Regular season | | | | | Playoffs |
| Season | Team | League | GP | G | A | Pts | PIM | GP | G | A | Pts | PIM |
|---|---|---|---|---|---|---|---|---|---|---|---|---|
| 1996–97 | Gap Alpes Patinage | FRA U18 |
| 1996–97 | Gap Alpes Patinage | FRA U22 |
| 1997–98 | LHC Les Lions | FRA | 43 | 1 | 2 | 3 | 33 | — | — | — | — | — |
| 1998–99 | LHC Les Lions | FRA | 42 | 4 | 4 | 8 | 14 | — | — | — | — | — |
| 1999–2000 | LHC Les Lions | FRA | 39 | 1 | 7 | 8 | 28 | — | — | — | — | — |
| 2000–01 | Dragons de Rouen | FRA | | 3 | 7 | 10 | | — | — | — | — | — |
| 2001–02 | University of Massachusetts Lowell | HE | 31 | 3 | 8 | 11 | 27 | — | — | — | — | — |
| 2002–03 | University of Massachusetts Lowell | HE | 32 | 1 | 11 | 12 | 16 | — | — | — | — | — |
| 2003–04 | Brûleurs de Loups | FRA | 28 | 3 | 7 | 10 | 4 | 8 | 1 | 5 | 6 | 8 |
| 2004–05 | Brûleurs de Loups | FRA | 22 | 4 | 9 | 13 | 14 | 12 | 2 | 2 | 4 | 8 |
| 2005–06 | Brûleurs de Loups | FRA | 26 | 4 | 12 | 16 | 10 | 7 | 2 | 1 | 3 | 2 |
| 2006–07 | Brûleurs de Loups | FRA | 24 | 9 | 9 | 18 | 30 | 12 | 4 | 4 | 8 | 10 |
| 2007–08 | Brûleurs de Loups | FRA | 26 | 4 | 15 | 19 | 14 | 6 | 2 | 4 | 6 | 2 |
| 2008–09 | Brûleurs de Loups | FRA | 26 | 7 | 12 | 19 | 46 | 11 | 0 | 2 | 2 | 10 |
| 2009–10 | Rögle BK | SEL | 51 | 2 | 5 | 7 | 30 | — | — | — | — | — |
| 2010–11 | Brûleurs de Loups | FRA | 15 | 4 | 5 | 9 | 26 | — | — | — | — | — |
| 2011–12 | Brûleurs de Loups | FRA | 20 | 0 | 7 | 7 | 10 | 15 | 2 | 6 | 8 | 10 |
| 2012–13 | Brûleurs de Loups | FRA | 24 | 2 | 14 | 16 | 30 | 8 | 0 | 2 | 2 | 4 |
| 2013–14 | Brûleurs de Loups | FRA | 26 | 2 | 15 | 17 | 12 | 5 | 0 | 2 | 2 | 0 |
| FRA totals | | | 361 | 45 | 118 | 163 | 271 | 84 | 13 | 28 | 41 | 54 |

- FRA totals do not include numbers from the 2000–01 season.

=== International ===
| Year | Team | Event | GP | G | A | Pts | PIM |
|---|---|---|---|---|---|---|---|
| 1997 | France | WJC B | 7 | 0 | 0 | 0 | 0 |
| 1997 | France | EJC B | 6 | 0 | 3 | 3 | 2 |
| 1998 | France | WJC B | 6 | 1 | 0 | 1 | 2 |
| 1999 | France | WJC B | 5 | 2 | 1 | 3 | 8 |
| 1999 | France | WC Q | 3 | 0 | 0 | 0 | 0 |
| 2000 | France | WC | 6 | 0 | 0 | 0 | 0 |
| 2001 | France | OGQ | 3 | 0 | 0 | 0 | 0 |
| 2001 | France | WC D1 | 5 | 1 | 1 | 2 | 0 |
| 2002 | France | OG | 4 | 0 | 0 | 0 | 0 |
| 2002 | France | WC D1 | 5 | 0 | 3 | 3 | 0 |
| 2003 | France | WC D1 | 5 | 1 | 1 | 2 | 2 |
| 2004 | France | WC | 6 | 0 | 0 | 0 | 2 |
| 2005 | France | OGQ | 6 | 0 | 2 | 2 | 2 |
| 2005 | France | WC D1 | 5 | 0 | 0 | 0 | 2 |
| 2006 | France | WC D1 | 5 | 1 | 2 | 3 | 4 |
| 2007 | France | WC D1 | 5 | 0 | 2 | 2 | 0 |
| 2008 | France | WC | 5 | 2 | 3 | 5 | 6 |
| 2009 | France | OGQ | 3 | 1 | 0 | 1 | 0 |
| 2009 | France | WC | 6 | 0 | 1 | 1 | 2 |
| 2010 | France | WC | 6 | 2 | 1 | 3 | 4 |
| 2012 | France | WC | 7 | 0 | 1 | 1 | 2 |
| 2013 | France | OGQ | 3 | 1 | 2 | 3 | 0 |
| 2014 | France | WC | 8 | 2 | 1 | 3 | 4 |
| Junior totals | | | 24 | 3 | 4 | 7 | 12 |
| Senior totals | | | 96 | 11 | 20 | 31 | 30 |
