= Lauri Lahesalu =

Estonian ice hockey player (born 1979)

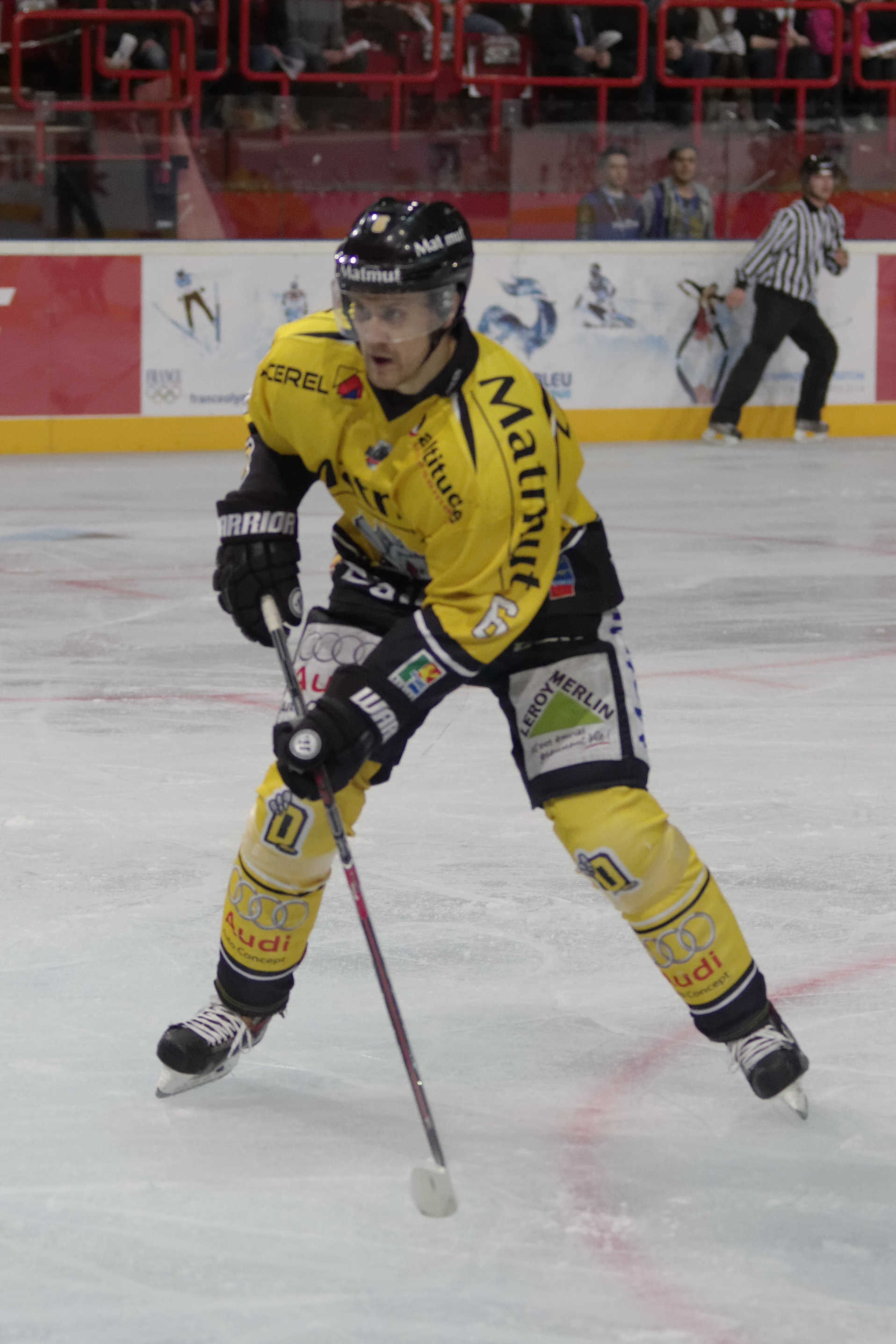
- Lahesalu with Dragons de Rouen in 2014
- Born: 29 March 1979 (age 47) Tallinn, then part of Estonian SSR, Soviet Union
- Height: 1.83 m (6 ft 0 in)
- Weight: 85 kg (187 lb; 13 st 5 lb)
- Position: Defence
- Shot: Left
- Played for: Jokipojat; TuTo Hockey; Hokki; Kärpät; Odense Bulldogs; Ducs d'Angers; Dragons de Rouen
- National team: Estonia
- NHL draft: Undrafted
- Playing career: 2000–2016

Lauri Lahesalu (born 29 March 1979) is an Estonian former professional ice hockey defenseman. He made a record 182 international appearances for Estonia, as well as playing club ice hockey in France.

== Career ==
Lahesalu started playing ice hockey for the club THK-88, who were local to him, after seeing an advertisement for players for the new club in a newspaper. He went on to make his international debut for the Estonia men's national ice hockey team on February 13, 1998, in a Codan Cup match against Denmark in Rödovre, which ended in a 7-7 draw. He was credited with his first assist for the Estonian national team on April 16 of that year, in the World Cup match against the Netherlands in Jesenice, in a match which finished 4-2. He scored his first international goal on April 6, 2002, in a World Cup match against Israel in Cape Town, South Africa. Lahesalu later served as team captain for the Estonian team.

He moved from Estonia to Finland and represented both the Tappara in Tampere, and Pori Ässäte U20 teams and later various Mestis clubs, including six SM-Liiga games for Oulu Kärpate in the 2003-2004 season. In the 2004-2005 season, he played for the Odense Bulldogs in Denmark.

Lahesalu spent eleven seasons in France and became the national champion twice, including winning the Ligue Magnus as a member of Dragons de Rouen in 2013. He also played club ice hockey in France in Angers for Ducs d'Angers. He stopped playing club hockey after the 2015-2016 season in order to prolong his international career with Estonia, keeping himself fit with daily gym sessions.

He played for Estonia in a record-breaking 182 international matches. His farewell game was held on 21 April 2025, against Lithuania at Tondiraba Ice Hall in the home Division I Group B pre-World Championship qualifiers. The game saw Estonia defeating Lithuania 3-2. In his honour, Lahesalu saw his pennant with the number 182 (to represents the number of games he played for the national team) hoisted onto the ceiling of the rink, an honour that had previously also been bestowed to long-serving national team members Aleksandr Petrov and Andrei Makrov.

== Career statistics ==
=== Regular season and playoffs ===
			Regular season					Playoffs
Season	Team	League	GP	G	A	Pts	PIM	GP	G	A	Pts	PIM
1997–98	Tappara	FIN U20	20	0	1	1	8	—	—	—	—	—
1998–99	Tappara	FIN U20	36	4	3	7	20	—	—	—	—	—
1999–00	Ässät	FIN U20	12	0	5	5	6	—	—	—	—	—
2000–01	Jokipojat	Mestis	42	2	10	12	24	—	—	—	—	—
2001–02	TuTo Hockey	Mestis	44	6	26	32	48	4	0	2	2	0
2002–03	Hokki	Mestis	44	5	23	28	56	3	0	1	1	2
2003–04	Kärpät	SM-l	6	0	1	1	0	—	—	—	—	—
2003–04	Hokki	Mestis	15	1	7	8	18	—	—	—	—	—
2004–05	Odense Bulldogs	DEN	32	4	6	10	22	15	0	1	1	4
2005–06	Hokki	Mestis	11	0	1	1	10	—	—	—	—	—
2005–06	Ducs d'Angers	FRA	14	1	1	2	26	5	0	0	0	2
2006–07	Ducs d'Angers	FRA	26	5	3	8	59	6	1	2	3	8
2007–08	Ducs d'Angers	FRA	26	6	10	16	34	8	0	5	5	4
2008–09	Ducs d'Angers	FRA	25	2	9	11	30	9	0	4	4	10
2009–10	Ducs d'Angers	FRA	26	4	20	24	8	13	2	4	6	6
2010–11	Ducs d'Angers	FRA	26	6	13	19	12	7	0	4	4	0
2011–12	Ducs d'Angers	FRA	26	1	11	12	14	11	1	5	6	2
2012–13	Dragons de Rouen	FRA	26	0	11	11	8	15	0	1	1	4
2013–14	Dragons de Rouen	FRA	25	0	9	9	16	9	1	2	3	4
2014–15	Ducs d'Angers	FRA	17	3	3	6	12	10	0	2	2	0
2015–16	Ducs d'Angers	FRA	21	1	3	4	10	16	0	6	6	6
SM-liiga totals			6	0	1	1	0	—	—	—	—	—

=== International ===
Year	Team	Event	Result	GP	G	A	Pts	PIM
1996	Estonia	EJC	20th	4	0	0	0	18
1997	Estonia	EJC	19th	4	1	0	1	2
1998	Estonia	WC-B	19th	7	0	1	1	0
1999	Estonia	WJC-C	23rd	4	1	1	2	6
1999	Estonia	WC-B	22nd	7	0	0	0	4
2000	Estonia	WC-B	22nd	7	0	3	3	2
2001	Estonia	WC-D1	28th	5	0	1	1	2
2002	Estonia	WC-D2	29th	5	1	1	2	0
2003	Estonia	WC-D1	22nd	5	0	1	1	4
2004	Estonia	OGQ	NQ	3	0	0	0	0
2005	Estonia	WC-D1	23rd	5	0	5	5	2
2006	Estonia	WC-D1	24th	5	0	1	1	6
2007	Estonia	WC-D1	23rd	5	1	4	5	6
2008	Estonia	WC-D1	27th	5	0	2	2	4
2009	Estonia	WC-D2	31st	5	0	5	5	2
2011	Estonia	WC-D1	27th	5	0	1	1	0
2012	Estonia	WC-D2	29th	5	1	3	4	0
2014	Estonia	WC-D2	29th	5	0	3	3	12
2015	Estonia	WC-D1	27th	5	0	2	2	6
2016	Estonia	WC-D1	27th	5	0	2	2	4
2016	Estonia	OGQ	NQ	3	2	9	11	2
2017	Estonia	WC-D1	26th	5	0	4	4	0
2018	Estonia	WC-D1	25th	5	0	2	2	0
2019	Estonia	WC-D1	26th	5	0	2	2	2
2020	Estonia	OGQ	NQ	3	0	1	1	2
2022	Estonia	WC-D1	25th	4	0	1	1	2
2023	Estonia	WC-D1	26th	5	0	0	0	10
Junior totals				12	2	1	3	26
Senior totals				119	5	54	59	72

== Awards and achievements ==
Award	Year
Ligue Magnus champion	2012–13
