= Viktor Wallin =

Swedish ice hockey player (born 1980)

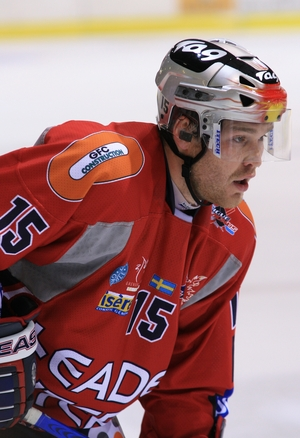
- Born: January 17, 1980 (age 46) Jönköping, Sweden
- Height: 6 ft 4 in (193 cm)
- Weight: 207 lb (94 kg; 14 st 11 lb)
- Position: Defence
- Shot: Left
- Played for: HV71; Timrå IK; AIK IF; Nybro Vikings; Brûleurs de Loups; HC Merano
- NHL draft: 112th overall, 1998; Mighty Ducks of Anaheim
- Playing career: 1998–2013

Viktor Wallin (born January 17, 1980) is a Swedish former ice hockey defenceman.

Wallin was drafted 112th overall by the Mighty Ducks of Anaheim in the 1998 NHL entry draft. He played in Elitserien for HV71 and Timrå IK and the HockeyAllsvenskan for AIK IF and Nybro Vikings.

In 2005, Wallin joined Grenoble-based team Brûleurs de Loups in the Ligue Magnus in France and remained with the team for six seasons. In 2011, Wallin signed for Italian Serie B team HC Merano.

== Career statistics ==
			Regular season					Playoffs
Season	Team	League	GP	G	A	Pts	PIM	GP	G	A	Pts	PIM
1996–97	HV71 J18	J18 Elit	—	—	—	—	—	—	—	—	—	—
1996–97	HV71 J20	J20 SuperElit	16	1	2	3	—	—	—	—	—	—
1997–98	HV71 J18	J18 Div.1	—	—	—	—	—	—	—	—	—	—
1997–98	HV71 J20	J20 SuperElit	28	9	15	24	42	—	—	—	—	—
1998–99	HV71 J20	J20 SuperElit	—	—	—	—	—	—	—	—	—	—
1998–99	HV71	Elitserien	23	0	0	0	4	—	—	—	—	—
1999–00	HV71 J20	J20 SuperElit	6	3	1	4	2	—	—	—	—	—
1999–00	HV71	Elitserien	43	2	2	4	16	6	1	1	2	4
2000–01	HV71	Elitserien	5	0	1	1	2	—	—	—	—	—
2001–02	Timrå IK	Elitserien	35	0	3	3	18	—	—	—	—	—
2002–03	AIK IF	Allsvenskan	40	2	12	14	28	10	1	3	4	6
2003–04	AIK IF	Allsvenskan	46	7	14	21	32	10	1	0	1	2
2004–05	Nybro Vikings IF	Allsvenskan	40	2	10	12	34	—	—	—	—	—
2005–06	Brûleurs de Loups	Ligue Magnus	24	4	10	14	4	7	1	4	5	4
2006–07	Brûleurs de Loups	Ligue Magnus	25	6	13	19	26	12	2	9	11	12
2007–08	Brûleurs de Loups	Ligue Magnus	24	5	10	15	12	6	1	3	4	16
2008–09	Brûleurs de Loups	Ligue Magnus	24	7	11	18	28	11	4	2	6	10
2009–10	Brûleurs de Loups	Ligue Magnus	20	2	11	13	16	—	—	—	—	—
2010–11	Brûleurs de Loups	Ligue Magnus	25	1	9	10	30	2	1	0	1	6
2011–12	HC Merano	Italy2	40	6	14	20	16	5	1	3	4	12
2012–13	HC Merano	Italy2	37	6	15	21	20	4	1	4	5	6
Elitserien totals			106	2	6	8	40	6	1	1	2	4
Ligue Magnus totals			142	25	64	89	116	38	9	18	27	48
Allsvenskan totals			126	11	36	47	94	20	2	3	5	8
Italy2 totals			77	12	29	41	36	9	2	7	9	18
