= Edo Terglav =

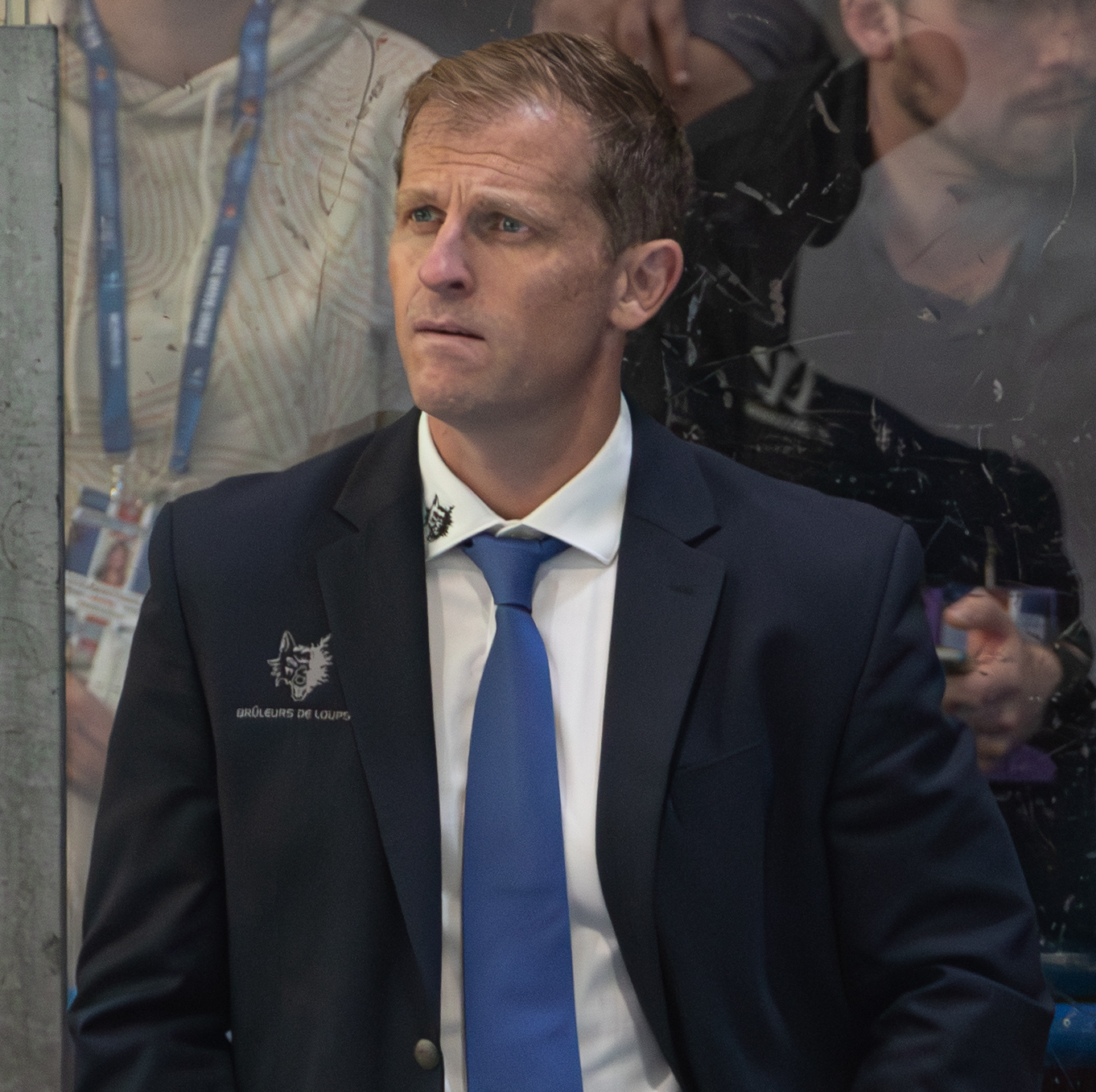
- Edo Terglav in 2025
- Born: January 24, 1980 (age 46) Kranj, SR Slovenia, SFR Yugoslavia
- Height: 6 ft 1 in (185 cm)
- Weight: 207 lb (94 kg; 14 st 11 lb)
- Position: Right wing
- Shot: Left
- Played for: Johnstown Chiefs; Detroit Vipers; New Mexico Scorpions; Olimpija Ljubljana; Diables Rouges de Briançon
- National team: Slovenia
- NHL draft: 249th overall, 1998; Buffalo Sabres
- Playing career: 2001–2012

Edo Terglav (born January 24, 1980) is a Slovenian former professional ice hockey right winger. He was drafted 249th overall by the Buffalo Sabres in the 1998 NHL entry draft, the first Slovenian selected in an NHL entry draft.

He currently works as an assistant coach and youth hockey supervisor for Diables Rouges de Briançon of the Ligue Magnus in France.

He has been the head coach of Slovenia men's national ice hockey team since 2024.

== Career statistics ==
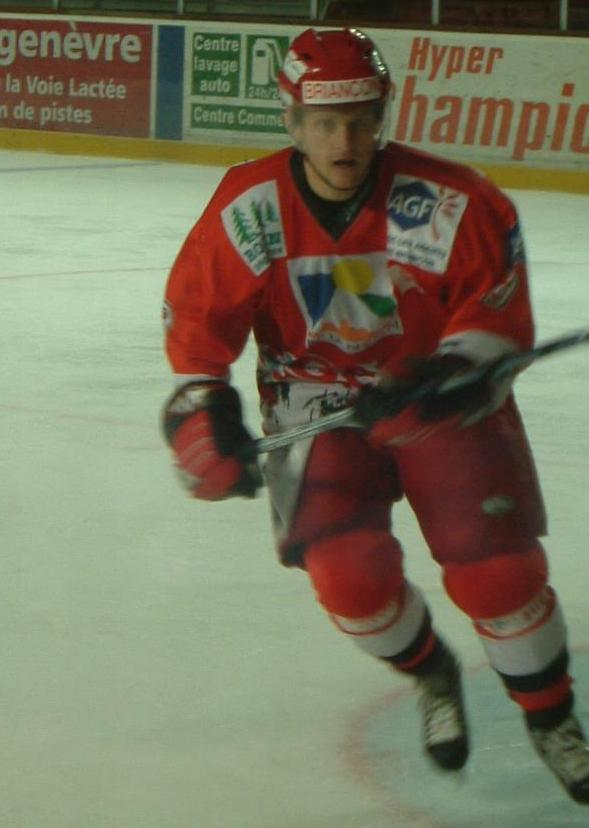
Edo Terglav in 2005

			Regular season					Playoffs
Season	Team	League	GP	G	A	Pts	PIM	GP	G	A	Pts	PIM
1995–96	Lac-St-Louis Lions	QMAAA	44	6	12	18	16	—	—	—	—	—
1996–97	Lac-St-Louis Lions	QMAAA	32	1	8	9	10	—	—	—	—	—
1997–98	Baie-Comeau Drakkar	QMJHL	46	17	27	44	40	—	—	—	—	—
1998–99	Baie-Comeau Drakkar	QMJHL	48	13	16	29	35	—	—	—	—	—
1999–00	Montreal Rocket	QMJHL	67	35	38	73	39	5	0	1	1	4
2000–01	Montreal Rocket	QMJHL	71	32	39	71	83	—	—	—	—	—
2000–01	Johnstown Chiefs	ECHL	6	1	0	1	0	1	0	0	0	0
2000–01	Detroit Vipers	IHL	1	2	0	2	0	—	—	—	—	—
2001–02	New Mexico Scorpions	CHL	24	1	5	6	9	—	—	—	—	—
2002–03	HDD Olimpija Ljubljana	IEL	16	4	4	8	26	—	—	—	—	—
2002–03	HDD Olimpija Ljubljana	Slovenia	23	16	21	37	26	5	4	2	6	2
2003–04	HDD Olimpija Ljubljana	IEL	16	5	7	12	41	4	2	2	4	2
2003–04	HDD Olimpija Ljubljana	Slovenia	14	7	7	14	10	4	2	0	2	4
2004–05	Diables Rouges de Briançon	France	26	18	16	34	40	4	0	1	1	29
2004–05	HDD Olimpija Ljubljana	Slovenia	—	—	—	—	—	6	0	3	3	18
2005–06	Diables Rouges de Briançon	France	21	17	11	28	16	—	—	—	—	—
2006–07	Diables Rouges de Briançon	France	25	18	21	39	12	8	1	2	3	6
2007–08	Diables Rouges de Briançon	France	26	14	23	37	22	9	6	7	13	8
2008–09	Diables Rouges de Briançon	France	24	16	24	40	28	12	5	10	15	6
2009–10	Diables Rouges de Briançon	France	20	11	20	31	10	9	5	5	10	4
2010–11	Diables Rouges de Briançon	France	12	4	11	15	33	—	—	—	—	—
2011–12	Diables Rouges de Briançon	France	21	10	15	25	4	3	0	0	0	0
France totals			175	108	141	249	165	45	17	25	42	53
