= Yohann Auvitu =

French ice hockey player (born 1989)

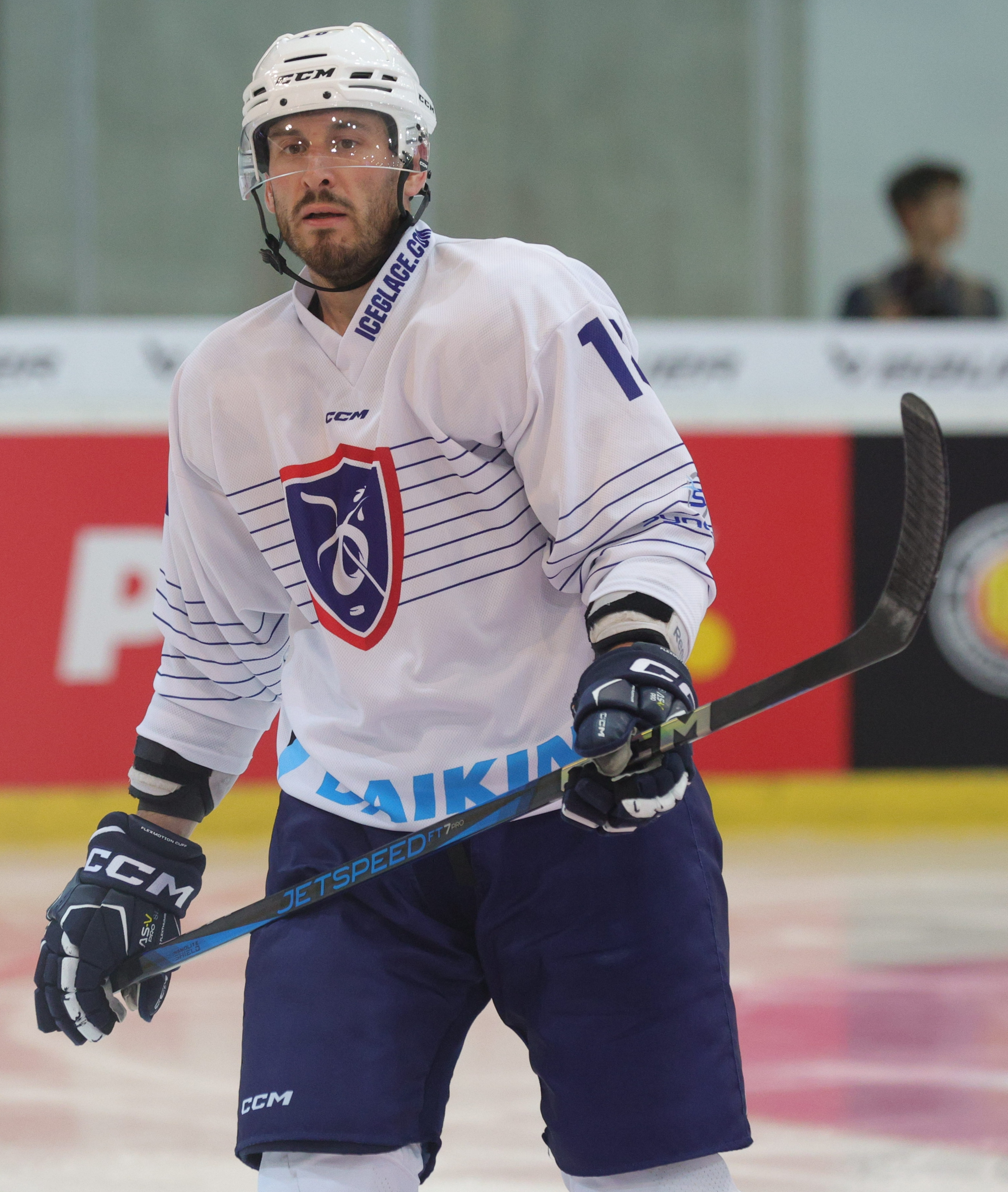
- Auvitu with France in 2024
- Born: July 27, 1989 (age 37) Ivry-sur-Seine, France
- Height: 5 ft 11 in (180 cm)
- Weight: 187 lb (85 kg; 13 st 5 lb)
- Position: Defence
- Shoots: Left
- ICEHL team Former teams: Steinbach Black Wings Linz; Mont-Blanc; JYP Jyväskylä; HIFK; New Jersey Devils; Edmonton Oilers; HC Sochi; Luleå HF; Neftekhimik Nizhnekamsk; Genève-Servette HC; HC Vítkovice
- National team: France
- NHL draft: Undrafted
- Playing career: 2006–present

Yohann Auvitu (born July 27, 1989) is a French professional ice hockey player who is a defenceman for Steinbach Black Wings Linz of the ICE Hockey League (ICEHL).

== Playing career ==
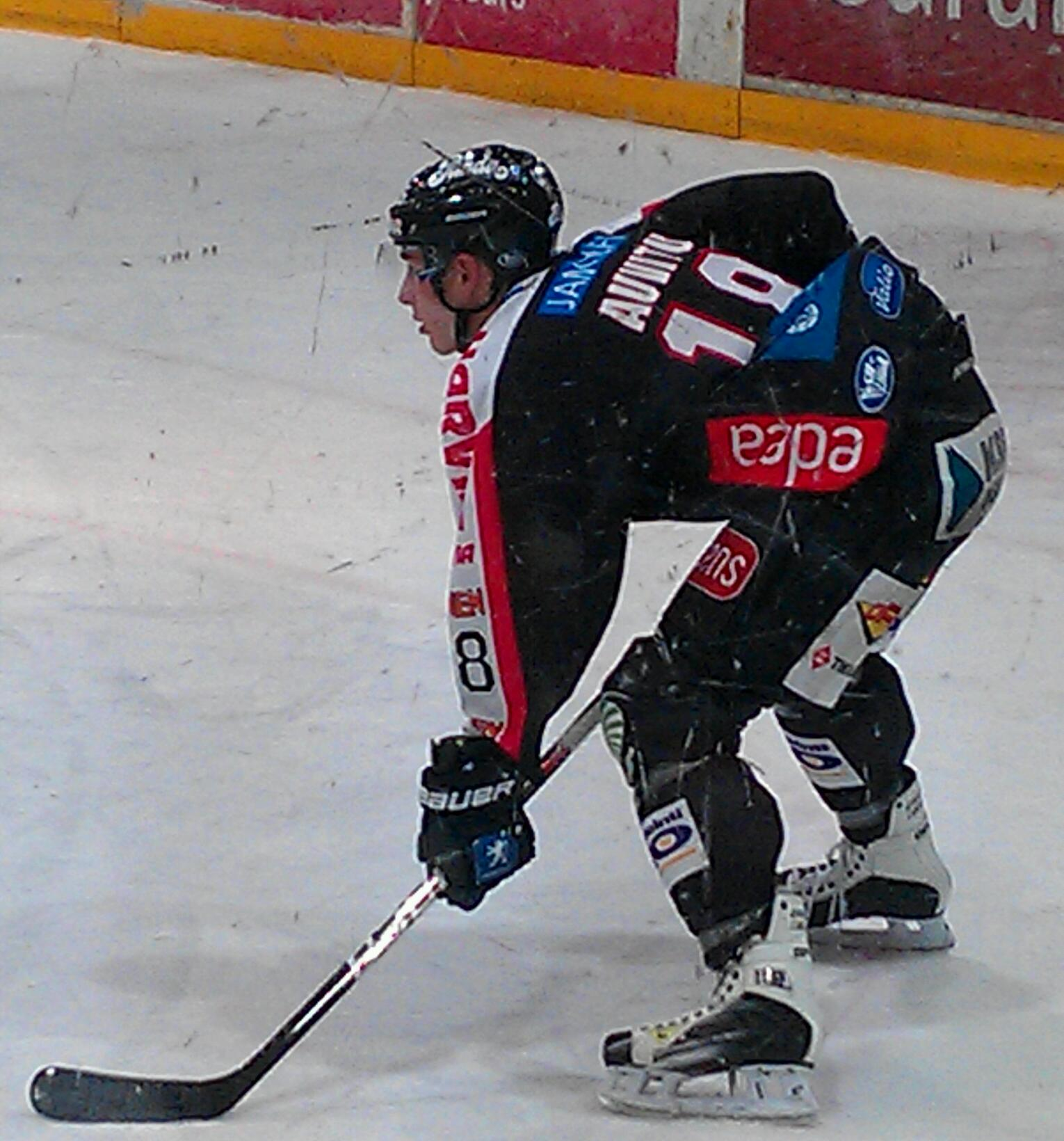
Auvitu preparing for face-off with JYP Jyväskylä in the 2011–12 season.

Auvitu left his native France in 2008 to continue his development with JYP Jyväskylä of Finland. He logged his first minutes in Finland's top-flight Liiga during the 2010–11 season. In 2012, he claimed the Finnish championship with JYP as well as the 2013–14 edition of the European Trophy. Auvitu left JYP to sign with fellow Liiga side HIFK before the 2014–15 campaign. After reaching the finals with HIFK, he won the 2015–16 Pekka Rautakallio trophy as the best defenceman in the Finnish Liiga. He was the first French player to win a Liiga Player Award. Auvitu also competed in the Champions Hockey League with HIFK.

Auvitu signed a one-year entry-level contract with the New Jersey Devils of the National Hockey League on May 27, 2016. He made his NHL debut in the 2016–17 season opener on October 13, 2016 against the Florida Panthers where he got his first NHL point with an assist. On November 11, 2016, Auvitu scored his first NHL goal. He appeared in 25 games with the Devils before splitting the year in the AHL with affiliate, the Albany Devils.

Leaving as a free agent from the Devils in the off-season, Auvitu agreed to a one-year, one-way deal with the Edmonton Oilers on July 10, 2017. Auvitu remained with the Oilers throughout the 2017–18 season, used in a depth role Auvitu registered 3 goals and 9 points in 33 games. He played as a forward for the first time in his career in a game against the Chicago Blackhawks, on January 7, 2018.

On July 2, 2018, Auvitu left the NHL as a free agent in signing a two-year contract with Russian club, HC Sochi of the Kontinental Hockey League (KHL). In the 2018–19 season, Auvitu began in a top four defensive role on the blueline for Sochi. He registered 2 goals and 6 points in 25 games with Sochi before opting to mutually terminate his contract with the club on January 15, 2019. On January 13, 2020, he signed with Luleå HF of the Swedish Hockey League (SHL). On January 13, 2021, Auvitu was signed by his former team, HIFK of the Finnish Liiga.

For the 2022–23 season, Auvitu was signed to a one-year contract by Neftekhimik Nizhnekamsk of the KHL on August 4, 2022. He featured in 20 regular season games with Nizhnekamsk, registering 3 points before opting to leave the club 27 November 2022. As a free agent leading into 2023, Auvitu later secured an initial one-month contract to join the Swiss club, Genève-Servette HC of the NL, on 2 January 2023.

== International play ==
Auvitu has participated in multiple editions of the IIHF World Championship beginning with the 2010 IIHF World Championship tournament as a member of the France National men's ice hockey team.

== Personal life ==
Auvitu married Ilariia Gorelova in 2014. The couple met at the JAMK University of Applied Sciences in central Finland. The couple gave birth to their daughter, Liya Auvitu in March 2016 in Helsinki, Finland.

He is fluent in five languages – French, English, Finnish, Russian and German.

== Career statistics ==
=== Regular season and playoffs ===
			Regular season					Playoffs
Season	Team	League	GP	G	A	Pts	PIM	GP	G	A	Pts	PIM
2004–05	Viry	FRA U18	9	2	4	6	4	6	3	5	8	2
2005–06	Mont-Blanc	FRA U18	3	10	4	14	0	—	—	—	—	—
2005–06	Mont-Blanc II	FRA.2 U18	3	4	1	5	2	—	—	—	—	—
2006–07	Mont-Blanc	FRA U22	11	5	7	12	18	—	—	—	—	—
2006–07	Mont-Blanc	FRA	23	8	2	10	4	2	0	0	0	0
2007–08	Mont-Blanc	FRA U22	15	12	14	26	0	2	5	0	5	0
2007–08	Mont-Blanc	FRA	20	5	5	10	8	6	0	3	3	2
2008–09	JYP	Jr. A	39	12	14	26	6	—	—	—	—	—
2009–10	JYP	Jr. A	2	1	2	3	2	—	—	—	—	—
2009–10	D Team	Mestis	44	9	6	15	12	12	2	1	3	6
2010–11	D Team	Mestis	34	10	11	21	34	8	4	2	6	4
2010–11	JYP	SM-l	7	0	0	0	0	—	—	—	—	—
2011–12	JYP	SM-l	33	1	1	2	8	11	1	0	1	6
2011–12	JYP-Akatemia	Mestis	9	2	4	6	6	—	—	—	—	—
2012–13	JYP	SM-l	44	3	9	12	18	10	1	1	2	8
2012–13	JYP-Akatemia	Mestis	1	1	0	1	0	—	—	—	—	—
2013–14	JYP	Liiga	29	1	5	6	8	6	2	1	3	2
2013–14	JYP-Akatemia	Mestis	1	0	0	0	0	—	—	—	—	—
2014–15	HIFK	Liiga	55	8	8	16	10	8	3	2	5	2
2015–16	HIFK	Liiga	48	6	15	21	6	18	6	7	13	14
2016–17	New Jersey Devils	NHL	25	2	2	4	2	—	—	—	—	—
2016–17	Albany Devils	AHL	29	5	8	13	2	—	—	—	—	—
2017–18	Edmonton Oilers	NHL	33	3	6	9	8	—	—	—	—	—
2018–19	HC Sochi	KHL	25	2	4	6	8	—	—	—	—	—
2019–20	Luleå HF	SHL	18	0	4	4	2	—	—	—	—	—
2020–21	HIFK	Liiga	5	1	1	2	0	—	—	—	—	—
2021–22	HIFK	Liiga	46	6	19	25	4	7	3	3	6	2
2022–23	Neftekhimik Nizhnekamsk	KHL	20	1	2	3	8	—	—	—	—	—
2023–24	HC Vítkovice	ELH	35	4	12	16	16	3	1	1	2	2
2024–25	HC Vítkovice	ELH	40	3	10	13	10	—	—	—	—	—
2025–26	HC Vítkovice	ELH	29	0	1	1	8	—	—	—	—	—
Liiga totals			267	26	58	84	54	60	16	15	31	34
NHL totals			58	5	8	13	10	—	—	—	—	—
KHL totals			45	3	6	9	9	—	—	—	—	—
ELH totals			104	7	23	30	34	3	1	1	2	2

=== International ===
Year	Team	Event	Result	GP	G	A	Pts	PIM
2006	France	WJC18 D1	18th	5	2	4	6	2
2007	France	WJC18 D1	22nd	5	2	3	5	4
2007	France	WJC D1	17th	5	1	0	1	2
2008	France	WJC D1	19th	5	0	1	1	2
2009	France	WJC D1	15th	5	3	7	10	0
2010	France	WC	14th	6	0	2	2	4
2011	France	WC	12th	6	0	1	1	2
2012	France	WC	9th	6	2	2	4	0
2013	France	OGQ	NQ	3	0	2	2	0
2013	France	WC	13th	7	0	0	0	2
2014	France	WC	8th	8	0	2	2	2
2015	France	WC	12th	7	0	3	3	0
2016	France	WC	14th	7	0	3	3	2
2017	France	WC	9th	7	2	5	7	2
2018	France	WC	12th	4	0	1	1	0
2022	France	WC	12th	7	0	2	2	2
2024	France	WC	14th	7	0	4	4	2
2024	France	OGQ	Q	3	0	3	3	2
2026	France	OG	11th	3	0	1	1	4
Junior totals				25	8	15	23	10
Senior totals				81	4	31	35	24
