= Landry Macrez =

French ice hockey player

- Born: 30 April 1982 (age 43) Amiens, FRA
- Height: 5 ft 9 in (175 cm)
- Weight: 159 lb (72 kg; 11 st 5 lb)
- Position: Goaltender
- Catches: Left
- Ligue Magnus team Former teams: Scorpions de Mulhouse; Dragons de Rouen; Corsaires de Dunkerque; Gothiques d'Amiens; Lyon Hockey Club; Amnéville Galaxians; Albatros de Brest; Pingouins de Morzine-Avoriaz; Yétis du Mont-Blanc; Vipers de Montpellier
- Playing career: 2002–present

Landry Macrez (born 30 April 1982) is a French professional ice hockey goaltender currently playing for the Scorpions de Mulhouse in the Ligue Magnus.

== Career ==
Macrez made his senior professional debut for Dragons de Rouen in France's Ligue Magnus in 2002 and, in his first season, Macrez and the Dragons were crowned Ligue Magnus champions. After two seasons in Rouen, he moved to another Ligue Magnus team, Corsaires de Dunkerque, where he played from 2004 to 2005. The 2005 season, however, saw Corsaires relegated to FFHG Division 1 and Macrez, looking to return to competition at the highest level, returned to Rouen and the Ligue Magnus for season 2006. Another shift in 2007 saw Macrez tend goal for Gothiques d'Amiens before arriving at the Lyon Hockey Club for season 2008. In 2009 he moved to Amnéville Galaxians, and in 2010 he moved to Albatros de Brest.

Macrez has also represented France at the 1999 Under-18 World Championships, the 2001 Under-20 World Championships and the 2006 Senior B World Championships where he was part of France's world champion team.

== Playing style ==
Macrez is a left-handed goalkeeper.
