= Henri-Corentin Buysse =

French ice hockey player

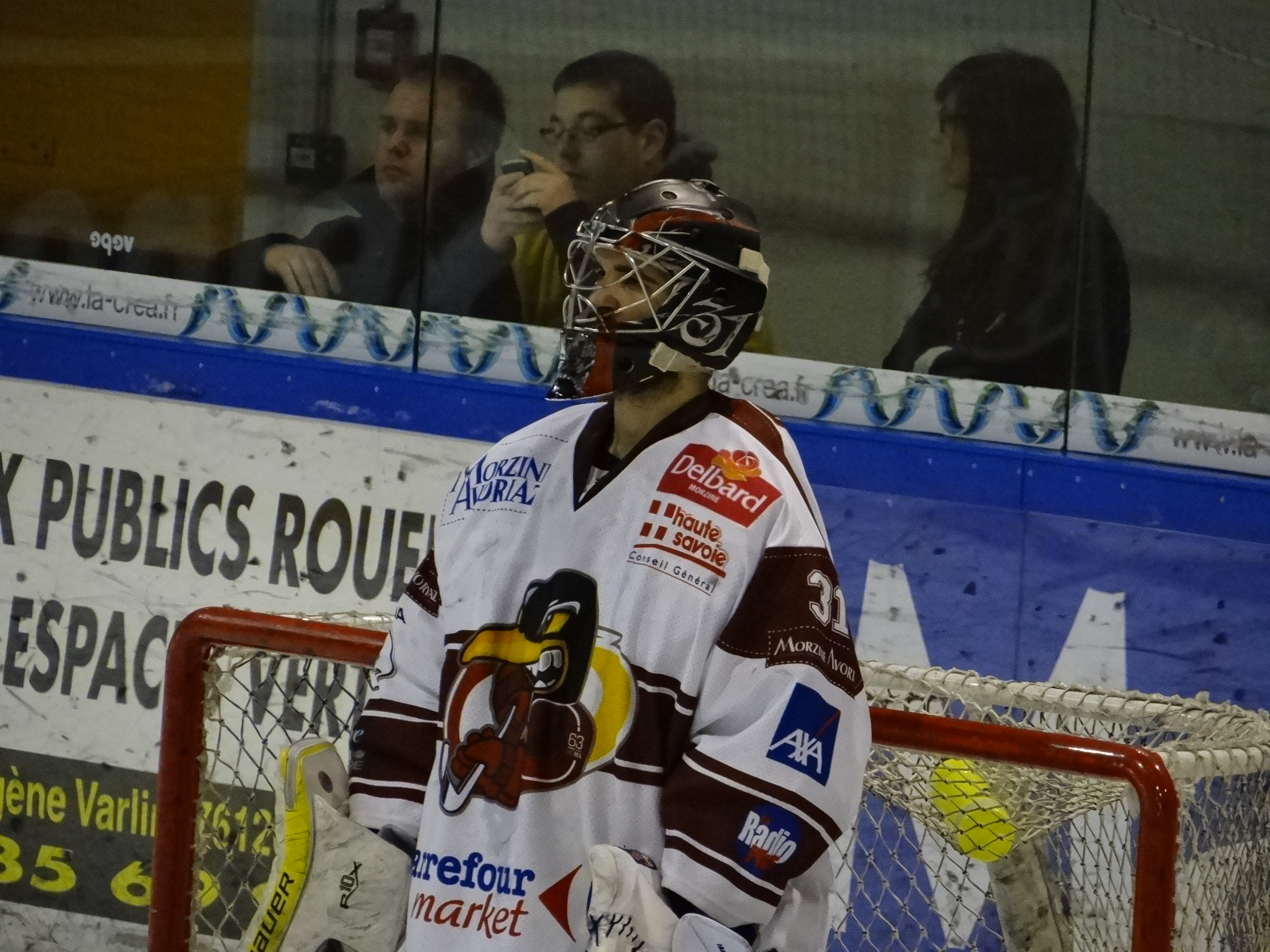
- Born: 18 March 1988 (age 37); Amiens, France
- Height: 1.85 m (6 ft 1 in)
- Weight: 86 kg (190 lb; 13 st 8 lb)
- Position: Goaltender
- Catches: Left
- LM team Former teams: Gothiques d'Amiens; Yétis du Mont-Blanc; Pingouins de Morzine-Avoriaz; Ducs de Dijon; Pionniers de Chamonix-Mont Blanc
- National team: France
- NHL draft: Undrafted
- Playing career: 2007–present

Henri-Corentin Buysse (born 18 March 1988) is a French ice hockey player for Gothiques d'Amiens and the French national team.

He represented France at the 2019 IIHF World Championship.
