= Daniel Welch (ice hockey) =

American ice hockey player

- Born: February 23, 1981 (age 45) Hastings, Minnesota, U.S.
- Height: 5 ft 10 in (178 cm)
- Weight: 194 lb (88 kg; 13 st 12 lb)
- Position: Forward
- Shot: Right
- Played for: AHL; Manchester Monarchs; ECHL; Reading Royals; Texas Wildcatters; Idaho Steelheads; CHL; Colorado Eagles; Texas Brahmas; Ligue Magnus; Pingouins de Morzine-Avoriaz; EIHL; Coventry Blaze; Nottingham Panthers; Edinburgh Capitals; Belfast Giants
- NHL draft: 245th overall, 2000; Los Angeles Kings
- Playing career: 2002–2011

Daniel Welch (born February 23, 1981) is an American former professional ice hockey player.

== Playing career ==
Welch was selected by the Los Angeles Kings in the 8th round (245th overall) of the 2000 NHL entry draft. He joined the team in 2003 but spent his time playing in the American Hockey League for the Manchester Monarchs and in the ECHL for the Reading Royals. The Kings released him in 2005 and he moved to the United Kingdom and signed for the Nottingham Panthers of the Elite Ice Hockey League, but he departed after just seven games and signed for the Coventry Blaze of the same league.

In 2006, Welch moved to France and signed for Pingouins de Morzine-Avoriaz in the Ligue Magnus. In 2007 he had a brief spell in Switzerland's National League B with HC Neuchâtel Young Sprinters, where he played four games, before returning to North America with the ECHL's Texas Wildcatters. In 2008 he had a spell in Denmark with TOTEMPO HvIK before returning once more to the ECHL with the Idaho Steelheads.

He then had brief spells in the Central Hockey League in 2009 with the Colorado Eagles and the Texas Brahmas before returning to the UK with the Edinburgh Capitals. On August 4, 2010, the Belfast Giants announced that they had signed Welch as a free agent.

== Career statistics ==
=== Regular season and playoffs ===
			Regular season					Playoffs
Season	Team	League	GP	G	A	Pts	PIM	GP	G	A	Pts	PIM
1997–98	Hastings High School	HSMN
1997–98	Rochester Jr. Americans	GHL	4	0	1	1	24	—	—	—	—	—
1998–99	Hastings High School	HSMN
1999–2000	University of Minnesota	WCHA	36	6	8	14	31	—	—	—	—	—
2000–01	Omaha Lancers	USHL	52	30	27	57	103	12	9	13	22	20
2001–02	Omaha Lancers	USHL	7	4	2	6	8	—	—	—	—	—
2001–02	University of Minnesota	WCHA	19	4	7	11	12	—	—	—	—	—
2002–03	University of Minnesota	WCHA	18	5	5	10	12	—	—	—	—	—
2002–03	Manchester Monarchs	AHL	42	3	9	12	22	3	0	0	0	0
2003–04	Manchester Monarchs	AHL	31	6	6	12	18	1	0	0	0	0
2004–05	Manchester Monarchs	AHL	59	3	10	13	49	1	0	0	0	0
2004–05	Reading Royals	ECHL	11	8	7	15	8	1	0	1	1	2
2005–06	Nottingham Panthers	EIHL	7	1	2	3	10	—	—	—	—	—
2005–06	Coventry Blaze	EIHL	40	22	21	43	26	6	2	6	8	16
2006–07	Pingouins de Morzine–Avoriaz	FRA	26	14	26	40	66	12	2	13	15	28
2007–08	HC Neuchâtel Young Sprinters	SUI.2	4	2	1	3	4	—	—	—	—	—
2007–08	Texas Wildcatters	ECHL	64	21	41	62	91	9	1	3	4	10
2008–09	Totempo HvIK	DEN	38	12	22	34	84	—	—	—	—	—
2008–09	Idaho Steelheads	ECHL	28	5	7	12	33	4	1	0	1	0
2009–10	Colorado Eagles	CHL	3	0	1	1	0	—	—	—	—	—
2009–10	Texas Brahmas	CHL	7	2	3	5	12	—	—	—	—	—
2009–10	Edinburgh Capitals	EIHL	44	16	24	40	69	2	0	0	0	4
2010–11	Belfast Giants	EIHL	54	20	47	67	84	3	1	1	2	0
AHL totals			132	12	25	37	89	5	0	0	0	0
EIHL totals			145	59	94	153	189	11	3	7	10	20

=== International ===
Year	Team	Event	GP	G	A	Pts	PIM
1999	United States	WJC18	6	0	3	3	6
Junior totals			6	0	3	3	6
