= Nicolas Pousset =

French ice hockey defenceman

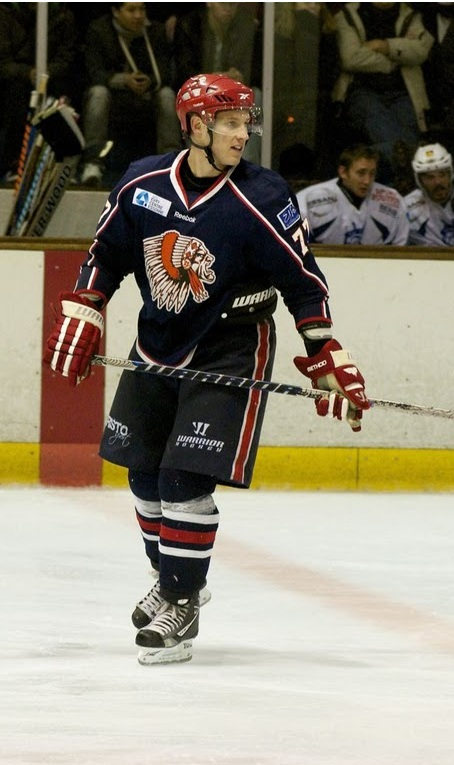
- Born: May 21, 1979 (age 46) Vincennes, France
- Height: 6 ft 0 in (183 cm)
- Weight: 190 lb (86 kg; 13 st 8 lb)
- Position: Defence
- Shot: Left
- Played for: Hockey Club de Reims; Dragons de Rouen; Diables Rouges de Briançon; Gothiques d'Amiens; Pingouins de Morzine-Avoriaz; Bisons de Neuilly-sur-Marne
- National team: France
- Playing career: 1996–2013

Nicolas Pousset (born May 21, 1979) is a French former ice hockey defenceman.

During his career. Pousset played for Hockey Club de Reims, Dragons de Rouen, Diables Rouges de Briançon, Gothiques d'Amiens, Pingouins de Morzine-Avoriaz and Bisons de Neuilly-sur-Marne. He won three league championships, two with Reims in 2000 and 2002 and a third with Rouen in 2003.

Pousset played in the 2004 IIHF World Championship for France.
