= Dave Henderson (ice hockey) =

French ice hockey player

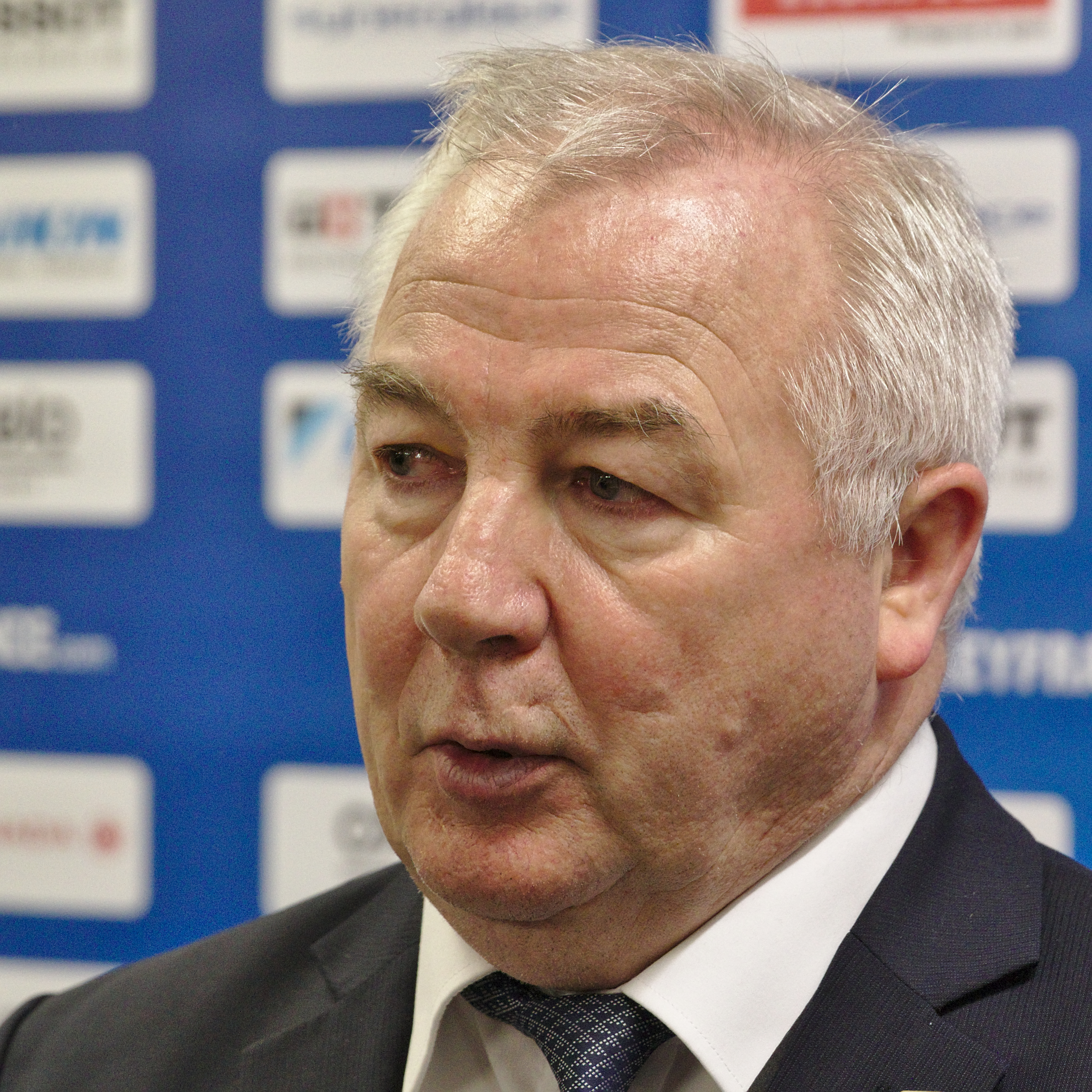
- Henderson in 2015
- Born: March 3, 1952 (age 74) Winnipeg, Manitoba, Canada
- Height: 5 ft 7 in (170 cm)
- Weight: 150 lb (68 kg; 10 st 10 lb)
- Position: Forward
- Played for: Gothiques d'Amiens
- National team: France
- NHL draft: Undrafted
- Playing career: 1975–1996

Dave Henderson (born March 3, 1952) is a Canadian-born ice hockey coach and a former French-national player. He represented France at the C Pool of the 1981 World Ice Hockey Championships in Beijing.

Henderson is the long-time head coach of the France men's national ice hockey team and the father of Brian Henderson.
