= Terglav =

Terglav may refer to:

- Triglav, the highest mountain in Slovenia
- Edo Terglav, Slovenian ice hockey player
