= Brian Henderson (ice hockey) =

French ice hockey player

- Born: November 22, 1986 (age 38); Amiens, France
- Height: 5 ft 11 in (180 cm)
- Weight: 181 lb (82 kg; 12 st 13 lb)
- Position: Forward
- Shoots: Left
- Ligue Magnus team Former teams: Ducs d'Angers; Gothiques d'Amiens
- National team: France
- Playing career: 2007–present

Brian Henderson (born November 22, 1986) is a professional French ice hockey player who participated at the 2010 IIHF World Championship as a member of the France National men's ice hockey team.

== International ==
Henderson was placed to the France men's national ice hockey team for competition at the 2014 IIHF World Championship.
