= Toni Kluuskeri =

Finnish ice hockey forward

- Born: April 7, 1991 (age 35) Uusikaupunki, Finland
- Height: 5 ft 11 in (180 cm)
- Weight: 165 lb (75 kg; 11 st 11 lb)
- Position: Forward
- Shot: Right
- Played for: TPS Turku; Pingouins de Morzine-Avoriaz; Perth Thunder; Jokers de Cergy-Pontoise
- Playing career: 2010–2021

Toni Kluuskeri (born April 7, 1991) is a Finnish former professional ice hockey forward. He last played for the Jokers de Cergy-Pontoise of the French Ligue Magnus.

Kluuskeri began his playing career with TPS, playing nine games during the 2010–11 SM-liiga season where he registered one assist. He spent the following season with Lukko's U20 junior team but never played a game for their senior side. From 2012, Kluuskeri has played outside of Finland, beginning with a spell in France's Ligue Magnus for Pingouins de Morzine-Avoriaz. On May 15, 2013, Kluuskeri signed for Nittorps IK of Sweden's third tier Hockeyettan.

Kluuskeri returned to France in 2014, signing for FFHG Division 1 side Corsaires de Dunkerque before moving to Australia to sign for the Perth Thunder. On August 13, 2015, Kluuskeri signed for Narvik Hockey of Norway's First Division. The following year, he returned to France for a third time, joining Remparts de Tours.
