= 2009–10 Ligue Magnus season =

2009–10 Ligue Magnus
- League: Ligue Magnus
- Sport: Ice hockey
- Duration: 26 games
- Teams: 14
- Regular-season winner: Dragons de Rouen
- Playoffs winner: Dragons de Rouen
- Promoted to Division 1: Drakkars de Caen
- Relegated to Division 1: Bisons de Neuilly-sur-Marne

Ligue Magnus seasons
- ← 2008–09 2010–11 →

The 2009–10 Ligue Magnus season was the 89th regular season of the ice hockey elite league in France and the sixth season of the Ligue Magnus.

== Regular season ==
	Team	GP	Pts	W	Wot	T	LOT	L	GF	GA
1	Dragons de Rouen	26	44	19	2	0	2	3	138	64
2	Diables Rouges de Briançon	26	44	18	3	0	2	3	127	66
3	Ducs d'Angers	26	38	18	1	0	0	7	135	72
4	Gothiques d'Amiens	26	36	15	3	0	0	8	130	91
5	Brûleurs de Loups de Grenoble	26	35	18	2	0	1	5	112	75
6	Pingouins de Morzine-Avoriaz	26	28	10	4	0	0	12	97	107
7	Étoile Noire de Strasbourg	26	27	12	1	0	1	12	75	88
8	Ducs de Dijon	26	27	9	3	0	3	11	102	126
9	Chamois de Chamonix	26	23	8	2	0	3	13	84	103
10	Ours de Villard-de-Lans	26	22	9	0	0	4	13	96	102
11	Rapaces de Gap	26	21	9	1	0	1	15	73	93
12	Dauphins d'Épinal	26	16	6	0	0	4	16	85	124
13	Bisons de Neuilly-sur-Marne	26	10	3	1	0	2	20	82	162
14	Avalanche du Mont-Blanc	26	9	4	1	0	1	20	74	137

== Playoffs ==
1/8 finals
1	Dragons de Rouen
Bye
8	Ducs de Dijon	1
9	Chamois de Chamonix	2
4	Gothiques d'Amiens
Bye
5	Brûleurs de loups de Grenoble	2
12	Dauphins d'Épinal	0
2	Diables Rouges de Briançon
Bye
7	Étoile noire de Strasbourg	2
10	Ours de Villard-de-Lans	0
3	Ducs d'Angers
Bye
6	Pingouins de Morzine	2
11	Rapaces de Gap	0

Quarterfinals
1	Dragons de Rouen	3
9	Chamois de Chamonix	0
4	Gothiques d'Amiens	1
5	Brûleurs de loups de Grenoble	3
2	Diables Rouges de Briançon	3
7	Étoile noire de Strasbourg	1
3	Ducs d'Angers	3
6	Pingouins de Morzine	0

Semifinals
1	Dragons de Rouen	3
5	Brûleurs de loups de Grenoble	0
2	Diables Rouges de Briançon	2
3	Ducs d'Angers	3

Final
1	Dragons de Rouen	3
3	Ducs d'Angers	2

== Relegation ==
- Bisons de Neuilly-sur-Marne - Avalanche Mont-Blanc 2:3 (3:2 SO, 3:1, 2:4, 2:3 SO, 2:6)

== Trophies ==
- Best scorer (Charles Ramsey Trophy) : Jonathan Bellemare (Angers)
- Best French player (Albert Hassler Trophy): Damien Fleury (Grenoble)
- Best goaltender (Jean Ferrand Trophy) : Ramón Sopko (Briançon)
- Best rookie (Jean-Pierre Graff Trophy): Ronan Quemener (Gap)
- Best coach : Luciano Basile (Briançon).
- Best referee : Jimmy Bergamelli.
- Fair play team (Marcel Claret Trophy) : Briançon.
