= 2013–14 Ligue Magnus season =

French ice hockey season

The 2013–14 Ligue Magnus season was the 93rd season of the Ligue Magnus, the top level of ice hockey in France. Diables Rouges de Briançon defeated Ducs d'Angers in the championship round.

== Regular season ==
	Team	GP	W	L	OTL	GF	GA	Diff	Pts
1.	Dragons de Rouen	26	21	3	2	121	57	+64	45
2.	Diables Rouges de Briançon	26	21	4	1	106	51	+55	44
3.	Ducs de Dijon	26	17	7	2	96	83	+13	36
4.	Ducs d'Angers	26	16	10	0	84	74	+10	32
5.	Brûleurs de Loups de Grenoble	26	14	9	3	79	70	+9	31
6.	Gothiques d'Amiens	26	13	10	3	93	87	+6	29
7.	Ours de Villard-de-Lans	26	13	11	2	72	90	−18	28
8.	Dauphins d'Épinal	26	12	11	3	116	112	+4	27
9.	Chamois de Chamonix	26	11	13	2	81	87	−6	24
10.	Étoile noire de Strasbourg	26	8	11	7	89	104	−15	23
11.	Pingouins de Morzine	26	10	14	2	89	101	−12	22
12.	Rapaces de Gap	26	10	14	2	82	100	−18	22
13.	Brest Albatros Hockey	26	9	17	0	81	115	−34	18
14.	Drakkars de Caen	26	7	18	1	61	119	−58	15

== Playoffs ==
1/8 finals
1	Dragons de Rouen
Bye
8	Dauphins d'Épinal	0
9	Chamois de Chamonix	3
4	Ducs d'Angers
Bye
5	Brûleurs de Loups de Grenoble	2
12	Rapaces de Gap	3
2	Diables Rouges de Briançon
Bye
7	Ours de Villard-de-Lans	3
10	Étoile noire de Strasbourg	1
3	Ducs de Dijon
Bye
6	Gothiques d'Amiens	2
11	Pingouins de Morzine	3

Quarterfinals
1	Dragons de Rouen	3
9	Chamois de Chamonix	0
4	Ducs d'Angers	3
12	Rapaces de Gap	0
2	Diables Rouges de Briançon	3
7	Ours de Villard-de-Lans	1
3	Ducs de Dijon	3
11	Pingouins de Morzine	1

Semifinals
1	Dragons de Rouen	2
4	Ducs d'Angers	4
2	Diables Rouges de Briançon	4
3	Ducs de Dijon	0

Final
4	Ducs d'Angers	3
2	Diables Rouges de Briançon	4

== Relegation ==
- Brest Albatros Hockey - Drakkars de Caen 3:4 (6:1, 2:3, 4:5, 5:1, 0:1, 3:2 SO, 3:4)
