= 2002–03 Super 16 season =

French ice hockey league season

The 2002–03 Super 16 season was the 82nd season of the Super 16, the top level of ice hockey in France. 15 teams participated in the league, and Dragons de Rouen won their seventh league title.

== First round ==
=== Northern Group ===
	Team	Pts	GP	W	OTW	T	L	OTL	GF	GA	Diff
1	Gothiques d'Amiens	20	14	10	0	0	4	0	67	32	+35
2	Dragons de Rouen	19	14	13	0	0	1	0	79	40	+39
3	Albatros de Brest	17	14	8	0	1	5	0	55	46	+9
4	Ducs de Dijon	14	14	7	0	0	7	0	51	57	-6
5	Diables Noirs de Tours	14	14	6	0	2	6	0	46	44	+2
6	Ducs d'Angers	12	14	6	0	0	8	0	50	50	0
7	Corsaires de Dunkerque	6	14	2	0	1	10	1	32	73	-41
8	Besançon	4	14	1	1	0	12	0	39	77	-38

=== Southern Group ===
	Team	Pts	GP	W	OTW	T	L	OTL	GF	GA	Diff
1	Scorpions de Mulhouse	24	12	11	1	0	0	0	61	15	+46
2	Brûleurs de Loups de Grenoble	20	12	10	0	0	2	0	54	29	+25
3	Orques d'Anglet	14	12	6	1	0	5	0	53	39	+14
4	Ours de Villard-de-Lans	14	12	7	0	0	5	0	39	38	+1
5	Diables Rouges de Briançon	7	12	2	0	1	7	2	30	52	-22
6	Rapaces de Gap	4	12	2	0	0	10	0	28	64	-36
7	Sangliers Arvernes de Clermont	3	12	1	0	1	10	0	29	57	-28

== Second round ==
=== Final round ===
	Team	Pts	GP	W	OTW	T	L	OTL	GF	GA	Diff
1	Dragons de Rouen	22	14	9	1	1	2	1	73	45	+28
2	Scorpions de Mulhouse	19	14	8	0	3	3	0	53	34	+19
3	Gothiques d'Amiens	19	14	9	0	1	4	0	51	38	+13
4	Brûleurs de Loups de Grenoble	19	14	8	0	2	3	1	64	50	+14
5	Albatros de Brest	12	14	5	0	2	7	0	46	57	-11
6	Orques d'Anglet	11	14	4	0	2	7	1	45	56	-11
7	Ours de Villard-de-Lans	8	14	3	0	2	9	0	38	53	-15
8	Ducs de Dijon	5	14	2	0	1	11	0	41	83	-42

==== Playoffs ====
Semi-finals
Hockey Club de Mulhouse	1
HC Amiens Somme	3
Dragons de Rouen	3
Brûleurs de Loups de Grenoble	0

Final
HC Amiens Somme	1
Dragons de Rouen	2
Third place
Brûleurs de Loups de Grenoble	0
Hockey Club de Mulhouse	2

=== Qualification round ===
	Teams	Pts	GP	W	OTW	T	L	OTL	GF	GA	Diff
1	Diables Noirs de Tours	20	10	9	1	0	0	0	57	22	+35
2	Sangliers Arvernes de Clermont	14	10	6	0	0	2	2	45	34	+11
3	Corsaires de Dunkerque	10	10	4	1	0	5	0	30	40	-10
4	Diables Rouges de Briançon	7	10	3	0	0	6	1	30	44	-14
5	Ducs d'Angers	6	10	2	1	0	7	0	29	40	-11
6	Rapaces de Gap	6	10	3	0	0	7	0	26	38	-12
