= Laurent Gras (ice hockey) =

French ice hockey player

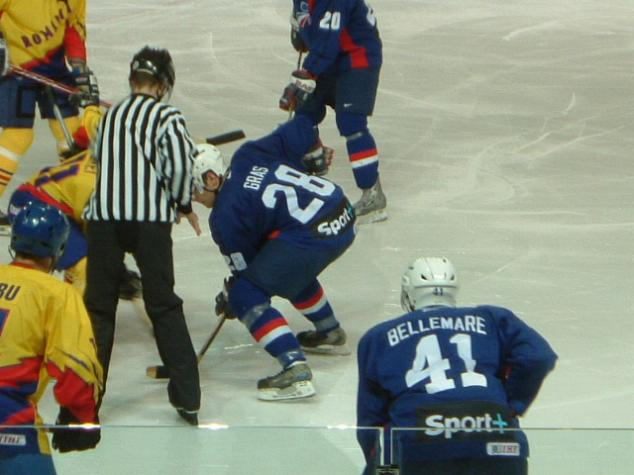
- Born: 15 March 1976 (age 49); Chamonix, France
- Height: 5 ft 10 in (178 cm)
- Weight: 185 lb (84 kg; 13 st 3 lb)
- Position: Centre
- Shot: Left
- National team: France
- Playing career: 1994–2015

Laurent Gras (born 15 March 1976 in Chamonix, France) is a professional French ice hockey player who participated at the 2010 IIHF World Championship as a member of the France National men's ice hockey team.
