= 2010–11 Ligue Magnus season =

2010–11 Ligue Magnus
- League: Ligue Magnus
- Sport: Ice hockey
- Number of teams: 14
- Regular-season winner: Dragons de Rouen
- Playoffs winner: Dragons de Rouen
- Promoted to Division 1: Bisons de Neuilly-sur-Marne
- Relegated to Division 1: Avalanche Mont-Blanc

Ligue Magnus seasons
- ← 2009–10 2011–12 →

The 2010–11 Ligue Magnus season was the 90th season of the Ligue Magnus, the top level of ice hockey in France. Fourteen teams participated in the league and Dragons de Rouen won their 11th league title.

== Regular season ==
Place	Team	GP	W	OTW	OTL	L	Pts	GF	GA	+/-
1.	Dragons de Rouen	26	20	2	1	3	45	158	73	+85
2.	Ducs d'Angers	26	15	4	3	4	41	114	60	+54
3.	Rapaces de Gap	26	14	3	3	6	37	101	82	+19
4.	Diables Rouges de Briançon	26	15	2	1	8	35	107	54	+53
5.	Gothiques d'Amiens	26	14	3	1	8	35	119	86	+33
6.	Dauphins d'Épinal	26	9	6	3	8	33	100	109	-9
7.	Brûleurs de Loups de Grenoble	26	11	2	2	11	28	76	96	-20
8.	Chamois de Chamonix	26	6	5	3	11	25	78	81	-3
9.	Pingouins de Morzine	26	8	3	3	12	25	81	103	-22
10.	Ours de Villard-de-Lans	26	9	1	2	14	22	72	122	-50
11.	Étoile noire de Strasbourg	26	7	2	5	12	22	68	83	-15
12.	Ducs de Dijon	26	7	3	1	15	21	90	108	-18
13.	Drakkars de Caen	26	5	2	4	15	18	74	114	-40
14.	Avalanche Mont-Blanc	26	3	1	7	15	15	75	142	-67

== Playoffs ==
=== First round ===
- Gothiques d'Amiens - Ducs de Dijon 2:0 (4:3 P, 3:2)
- Dauphins d'Épinal - Étoile noire de Strasbourg 1:2 (1:4, 3:2, 0:2)
- Brûleurs de Loups de Grenoble - Ours de Villard-de-Lans 0:2 (3:4 P, 2:4)
- Chamois de Chamonix - Pingouins de Morzine 1:2 (4:1, 1:2 SN, 3:4)

=== Quarterfinals ===
- Dragons de Rouen - Pingouins de Morzine 3:0 (6:2, 4:1, 6:1)
- Ducs d'Angers - Ours de Villard-de-Lans 3:0 (8:0, 10:1, 7:5)
- Rapaces de Gap - Étoile noire de Strasbourg 2:3 (2:1, 4:3 SN, 2:9, 2:3 OT, 4:6)
- Diables Rouges de Briançon - Gothiques d'Amiens 1:3 (5:3, 4:5, 1:5, 2:3)

=== Semifinals ===
- Dragons de Rouen - Gothiques d'Amiens 3:0 (3:1, 2:1, 9:8 SN)
- Ducs d'Angers - Étoile noire de Strasbourg 1:3 (1:2 OT, 6:1, 1:2 SN, 1:3)

=== Final ===
- Dragons de Rouen - Étoile noire de Strasbourg 3:0 (5:1, 5:3, 4:2)

== Relegation ==
- Drakkars de Caen - Avalanche Mont-Blanc 3:1 (3:2 OT, 1:2, 4:3, 2:1)
