= 2001–02 Élite Ligue season =

French ice hockey league season

The 2001–02 Élite Ligue season was the 81st season of the Élite Ligue, the top level of ice hockey in France. Seven teams participated in the league, and Hockey Club de Reims won their second league title.

== Regular season ==
	Club	GP	W	OTW	T	OTL	L	GF	GA	Pts
1.	Hockey Club de Reims	36	21	3	3	1	8	135	100	35
2.	Dragons de Rouen	36	19	1	1	4	10	145	113	32
3.	Brûleurs de Loups de Grenoble	36	13	6	4	2	11	127	114	29
4.	HC Amiens Somme	36	17	0	4	4	11	128	96	27
5.	Anglet Hormadi Élite	36	9	3	1	3	20	115	151	20
6.	Ducs d'Angers	36	10	2	5	1	18	113	155	19
7.	Hockey Club de Mulhouse	36	8	2	3	4	19	103	137	18
