= 1992 IIHF European U18 Championship =

The 1992 IIHF European U18 Championship was the twenty-fifth playing of the IIHF European Junior Championships.

== Group A ==
Played April 5–12 in Lillehammer and Hamar, Norway

=== First round ===
Group 1

Team	TCH	SWE	GER	SUI	GF/GA	Points
1. Czechoslovakia		5:3	5:2	8:4	18:9	6
2. Sweden	3:5		2:2	6:2	11:9	3
3. Germany	2:5	2:2		3:3	7:10	2
4. Switzerland	4:8	2:6	3:3		9:17	1

Group 2

Team	RUS	FIN	POL	NOR	GF/GA	Points
1. Russia		3:2	10:0	8:2	21:4	6
2. Finland	2:3		17:0	7:2	26:5	4
3. Poland	0:10	0:17		5:3	5:30	2
4. Norway	2:8	2:7	3:5		7:20	0

=== Final round ===
Championship round

Team	TCH	SWE	RUS	FIN	GER	POL	GF/GA	Points
1. Czechoslovakia		(5:3)	2:0	5:3	(5:2)	15:1	32:9	10
2. Sweden	(3:5)		3:1	1:1	(2:2)	6:1	15:10	6
3. Russia	0:2	1:3		(3:2)	6:2	(10:0)	20:9	6
4. Finland	3:5	1:1	(2:3)		8:0	(17:0)	31:9	5
5. Germany	(2:5)	(2:2)	2:6	0:8		7:4	13:25	3
6. Poland	1:15	1:6	(0:10)	(0:17)	4:7		6:55	0

7th place

Norway	4:5 (1:1, 2:3, 1:1)	4:3 (1:1, 0:2, 3:0)	4:1 (3:1, 1:0, 0:0)	Switzerland

Switzerland was relegated to Group B for 1993. Czechoslovakia competed for the last time, the Czech Republic assumed their spot in Group A and Slovakia began playing in Group C in 1993.

== Tournament Awards ==
- Top Scorer (Czechoslovakia) David Výborný (14 points)
- Top Goalie: (Germany) Marc Seliger
- Top Defenceman: (Russia) Sergei Gonchar
- Top Forward: (Czechoslovakia) David Výborný

== Group B ==
Played March 22–28 in Pralognan-la-Vanoise, Méribel and Courchevel, France.

=== First round ===
Group 1

Team	ITA	AUT	FRA	GBR	GF/GA	Points
1. Italy		1:0	4:4	3:3	8:7	4
2. Austria	0:1		5:3	7:3	12:7	4:2
3. France	4:4	3:5		9:2	16:11	3
4. Great Britain	3:3	3:7	2:9		8:19	1

Group 2

Team	DEN	ROM	YUG	ESP	GF/GA	Points
1. Denmark		7:4	9:5	6:1	22:10	6
2. Romania	4:7		7:5	13:2	24:14	4
3. Yugoslavia	5:9	5:7		4:2	14:18	2:4
4. Spain	1:6	2:13	2:4		5:23	0

=== Final round ===
Championship round

Team	ITA	DEN	AUT	ROM	GF/GA	Points
1. Italy		6:1	(1:0)	5:4	12:5	6
2. Denmark	1:6		6:5	(7:4)	14:15	4
3. Austria	(0:1)	5:6		5:0	10:7	2
4. Romania	4:5	(4:7)	0:5		8:17	0

Placing round

Team	FRA	ESP	GBR	YUG	GF/GA	Points	Tie 1 H2H Points	Tie 2 H2H GD
1. France		6:1	(9:2)	18:2	33:5	6		
2. Spain	1:6		5:1	(2:4)	8:11	2	2	+2
3. Great Britain	(2:9)	1:5		8:4	11:18	2	2	0
4. Yugoslavia	2:18	(4:2)	4:8		10:28	2	2	-2

Italy was promoted to Group A and Yugoslavia was relegated to Group C, for 1993.

- With the breakup of the Socialist Federal Republic of Yugoslavia in 1991 and 1992, the Federal Republic of Yugoslavia assumed their place, but did not participate again until 1995. Also two new former republics would appear in the next championship, Slovenia and Croatia.

== Group C ==
Played March 19–22 in Eindhoven of the Netherlands.

Team	HUN	NED	BUL	BEL	GF/GA	Points
1. Hungary		9:1	13:0	12:0	34:1	6
2. Netherlands	1:9		4:3	12:5	17:17	4
3. Bulgaria	0:13	3:4		6:1	9:18	2
4. Belgium	0:12	5:12	1:6		6:30	0

Hungary was promoted to Group B for 1993.
