= 1994–95 Élite Ligue season =

French ice hockey league season

The 1994–95 Élite Ligue season was the 74th season of the Élite Ligue, the top level of ice hockey in France. Eight teams participated in the league, and the Dragons de Rouen won their fifth league title.

== Regular season ==
	Club	GP	W	T	L	GF	GA	Pts
1.	Dragons de Rouen	28	22	2	4	159	66	46
2.	Albatros de Brest	28	16	4	8	147	82	36
3.	Chamonix Hockey Club	28	15	3	10	106	107	33
4.	Brûleurs de Loups de Grenoble	28	15	3	10	89	90	33
5.	Hockey Club de Reims	28	12	5	11	104	92	29
6.	HC Amiens Somme	28	11	3	14	103	108	25
7.	Ducs d'Angers	28	5	4	19	81	141	14
8.	Viry-Châtillon Essonne Hockey	28	3	2	23	81	184	8

== Playoffs ==
Quarter-finals
Albatros de Brest	3
Ducs d'Angers	1
Chamonix Hockey Club	3
HC Amiens Somme	1
Dragons de Rouen	3
Viry-Châtillon Essonne Hockey	0
Brûleurs de Loups de Grenoble	0
Hockey Club de Reims	3

Semi-finals
Albatros de Brest	3
Chamonix Hockey Club	1
Dragons de Rouen	3
Hockey Club de Reims	0

Final
Albatros de Brest	0
Dragons de Rouen	1
Third place
Hockey Club de Reims	0
Chamonix Hockey Club	1
