= 2003–04 Super 16 season =

French ice hockey league season

The 2003–04 Super 16 season was the 83rd season of the Super 16, the top level of ice hockey in France. 15 teams participated in the league, and Gothiques d'Amiens won their second league title.

== First round ==
=== Western Group ===
	Team	GP	Pts	W	OTW	T	L	OTL	GF	GA	Diff
1	Gothiques d'Amiens	14	18	9	0	0	3	0	61	31	+30
2	Orques d'Anglet	14	17	8	0	1	3	0	49	35	+14
3	Albatros de Brest	14	16	8	0	0	4	0	55	36	+19
4	Diables Noirs de Tours	14	14	5	1	1	4	1	47	49	-2
5	Dragons de Rouen	14	14	6	1	0	5	0	47	32	+15
6	Ducs d'Angers	14	6	1	1	1	8	1	36	63	-27
7	Corsaires de Dunkerque	14	2	0	0	1	10	1	25	74	-49

=== Eastern Group ===
	Team	GP	Pts	W	OTW	T	L	OTL	GF	GA	Diff
1	Brûleurs de Loups de Grenoble	14	26	11	1	1	0	1	58	21	+37
2	Scorpions de Mulhouse	14	23	10	1	1	2	0	67	19	+48
3	Ducs de Dijon	14	16	6	2	0	6	0	54	51	+3
4	Ours de Villard-de-Lans	14	15	5	1	1	5	2	35	38	-3
5	Dauphins d'Épinal	14	15	4	2	1	5	2	42	45	-3
6	Sangliers Arvernes de Clermont	14	12	4	1	1	7	1	45	73	-28
7	Diables Rouges de Briançon	14	8	3	0	1	9	1	40	48	-8
8	Rapaces de Gap	14	5	2	0	0	11	1	29	75	-46

== Second round ==
=== Final round ===
	Team	GP	Pts	W	OTW	T	L	OTL	GF	GA	Diff
1	Brûleurs de Loups de Grenoble	14	21	10	0	1	3	0	52	28	+24
2	Gothiques d'Amiens	14	18	8	0	1	4	1	47	39	+8
3	Scorpions de Mulhouse	14	17	8	0	0	5	1	37	36	+1
4	Albatros de Brest	14	16	7	1	0	6	0	49	47	+2
5	Ours de Villard-de-Lans	14	14	7	0	0	7	0	40	37	+3
6	Orques d'Anglet	14	13	5	1	1	7	0	41	43	-2
7	Ducs de Dijon	14	9	4	0	0	9	1	41	54	-13
8	Diables Noirs de Tours	14	8	1	2	1	9	1	32	55	-23

==== Playoffs ====
Quarter-finals
HC Amiens Somme	3
Ducs de Dijon	2
Hockey Club de Mulhouse	2
Anglet Hormadi Élite	3
Brûleurs de Loups de Grenoble	3
Diables Noirs de Tours	0
Albatros de Brest	3
Ours de Villard-de-Lans	1

Semi-finals
HC Amiens Somme	3
Anglet Hormadi Élite	0
Brûleurs de Loups de Grenoble	3
Albatros de Brest	0

Final
HC Amiens Somme	2
Brûleurs de Loups de Grenoble	0
Third place
Anglet Hormadi Élite	1
Albatros de Brest	0

=== Relegation round ===
	Team	GP	Pts	W	OTW	T	L	OTL	GF	GA	Diff
1	Dragons de Rouen	12	23	10	1	0	0	1	58	29	+29
2	Ducs d'Angers	12	18	7	2	0	3	0	56	35	+21
3	Diables Rouges de Briançon	12	15	6	0	1	3	2	47	39	+8
4	Sangliers Arvernes de Clermont	12	14	6	1	0	5	0	51	45	+6
5	Rapaces de Gap	12	10	4	0	1	6	1	30	46	-16
6	Dauphins d'Épinal	12	6	3	0	0	9	0	33	56	-23
7	Corsaires de Dunkerque	12	2	1	0	0	11	0	30	55	-25
