= 1995–96 Élite Ligue season =

French ice hockey league season

The 1995–96 Élite Ligue season was the 75th season of the Élite Ligue, the top level of ice hockey in France. Eight teams participated in the league, and Albatros de Brest won their first league title.

== Regular season ==
	Club	GP	W	T	L	GF	GA	Pts
1.	Dragons de Rouen	28	22	1	5	172	77	45
2.	Albatros de Brest	28	19	4	5	142	70	42
3.	HC Amiens Somme	28	13	5	10	108	101	31
4.	Hockey Club de Reims	28	10	9	9	111	105	29
5.	Brûleurs de Loups de Grenoble	28	10	5	13	101	109	25
6.	Chamonix Hockey Club	28	10	5	13	101	97	25
7.	Ducs d'Angers	28	8	5	15	84	112	21
8.	Viry-Châtillon Essonne Hockey	28	2	2	24	78	226	6

== Playoffs ==
Quarter-finals
Dragons de Rouen	3
Viry-Châtillon Essonne Hockey	0
Hockey Club de Reims	3
Brûleurs de Loups de Grenoble	0
Albatros de Brest	3
Ducs d'Angers	2
HC Amiens Somme	3
Chamonix Hockey Club	2

Semi-finals
Dragons de Rouen	3
Hockey Club de Reims	0
Albatros de Brest	3
HC Amiens Somme	1

Final
Dragons de Rouen	0
Albatros de Brest	3
Third place
HC Amiens Somme	1
Flammes Bleues de Reims	3
