= 2005–06 Ligue Magnus season =

French professional ice hockey season

The 2005–06 Ligue Magnus season was the 85th season of the Ligue Magnus, the top level of ice hockey in France. 14 teams participated in the league, and Dragons de Rouen won their eighth league title.

== Regular season ==
	Team	GP	W	OTW	T	OTL	L	Pts	GF	GA	Diff
1	Dragons de Rouen	26	22	3	1	0	0	51	153	47	+106
2	Brûleurs de Loups de Grenoble	26	17	1	1	1	6	38	109	54	+55
3	Gothiques d'Amiens	26	13	3	2	2	6	36	89	65	+24
4	Briançon	26	15	1	1	2	7	35	98	69	+29
5	Ducs de Dijon	26	14	2	1	0	9	33	94	68	+26
6	Pingouins de Morzine	26	13	1	2	1	9	31	99	79	+20
7	Ours de Villard-de-Lans	26	11	2	1	2	10	29	77	74	+3
8	Ducs d'Angers	26	10	1	1	5	9	28	82	81	+1
9	Orques d'Anglet	26	9	3	3	0	11	27	79	89	-10
10	Avalanche Mont-Blanc	26	8	2	1	1	14	22	63	97	-34
11	Dauphins d'Épinal	26	5	3	2	3	13	21	67	90	-23
12	Drakkars de Caen	26	5	2	1	3	15	18	60	105	-45
13	Chamois de Chamonix	26	4	1	1	2	18	13	67	124	-57
14	Rapaces de Gap	26	2	0	0	3	21	7	55	150	-95

== Playoffs ==
First round
1	Dragons de Rouen
Bye
8	Ducs d'Angers	2
9	Orques d'Anglet	0
4	Diables Rouges de Briançon
Bye
5	Ducs de Dijon	2
12	Drakkars de Caen	0
2	Brûleurs de Loups de Grenoble
Bye
7	Ours de Villard-de-Lans	1
10	Avalanche Mont-Blanc	2
3	Gothiques d'Amiens
Bye
6	Pingouins de Morzine	0
11	Dauphins d'Épinal	2

Quarterfinals
1	Dragons de Rouen	3
8	Ducs d'Angers	0
4	Diables Rouges de Briançon	1
5	Ducs de Dijon	3
2	Brûleurs de Loups de Grenoble	3
10	Avalanche Mont-Blanc	0
3	Gothiques d'Amiens	3
11	Dauphins d'Épinal	0

Semifinals
1	Dragons de Rouen	3
5	Ducs de Dijon	0
2	Brûleurs de Loups de Grenoble	1
3	Gothiques d'Amiens	3

Final
1	Dragons de Rouen	3
3	Gothiques d'Amiens	0

== Relegation ==
=== Round 1 ===
- Chamonix Hockey Club - Gap Hockey Club 3:2 (6:3, 2:3, 2:3, 5:0, 4:3)

=== Round 2 ===
- Chamonix Hockey Club - Corsaires de Dunkerque 6:1/3:3
