= Corsaires de Dunkerque =

- City: Dunkerque, France
- League: FFHG Division 1
- Founded: 1979
- Operated: 1979–present
- Home arena: Patinoire Michel-Raffoux
- Colours: Blue, yellow
- General manager: François Rozenthal
- Head coach: François Rozenthal
- Website: hockey-corsaires.com

Championships
- Division 2: 1 (2011)

Previous logo

The Corsaires de Dunkerque are an ice hockey team in Dunkerque, France. They were founded in 1979, and play in the FFHG Division 1, the second level of French ice hockey. The Corsaires previously played in the Ligue Magnus.

== History ==
The Corsaires de Dunkerque were formed in 1979. After playing in the FFHG Division 1 league through the nineties the team moved up to the Ligue Magnus for the start of the 2002–03 season. After surviving relegation in the 2003–04 season the Corsaires were relegated back to Division 1 due to financial reasons. In 2007 the team were sent to the Division 1 relegation round and were relegated to the FFHG Division 2 for the 2007–08 season. In their fourth season in Division 2 the Corsaires won the 2011 playoffs and earned promotion back to Division 2.

== Players and personnel ==
=== Current roster ===
Team roster for the 2014–15 season

| # | Nat | Name | Pos | Date of birth | Acquired | Birthplace |
|---|---|---|---|---|---|---|
| 3 | (France) | Francis Ballet (C) | D | 3 December 1983 | 2013 | Neuilly-sur-Seine, France |
| 47 | (France) | Benjamin Bataille | D | 10 June 1993 | 2011 | Dunkerque, France |
| | (France) | Pierrick Boudot | G | 9 July 1987 | 2014 | Vichy, France |
| 8 | (France) | Maxime Brachet | F | 20 January 1990 | 2011 | Dunkerque, France |
| 73 | (Canada) | Mathieu Cyr (A) | F | 28 June 1985 | 2013 | Fredericton, New Brunswick, Canada |
| 22 | (France) | Loïc Destoop | F | 14 April 1988 | 2005 | Dunkerque, France |
| | (France) | Clément Derepper | D | 9 December 1986 | 2003 | Saint-Pol-sur-Mer, France |
| 26 | (France) | Christophe Eichenholc | F | 24 May 1977 | 2014 | Dunkerque, France |
| 10 | (United States) | Ryan Heavey | D | 3 June 1991 | 2014 | Andover, Massachusetts, United States |
| 19 | (France) | César Joffre | F | 21 October 1990 | 2014 | Échirolles, France |
| 77 | (Slovenia) | Denis Kadic | F | 9 September 1983 | 2014 | Jesenice, SFR Yugoslavia |
| 46 | (Finland) | Toni Kluuskeri | F | 7 April 1991 | 2014 | Uusikaupunki, Finland |
| 61 | (Slovakia) | Miroslav Kristín | F | 22 January 1982 | 2014 | Trenčín, Czechoslovakia |
| 50 | (Canada) | Marc-André Martel | G | 1 July 1986 | 2010 | Boisbriand, Quebec, Canada |
| 94 | (France) | Brendan Martial | F | 27 February 1989 | 2013 | Créteil, France |
| 56 | (Slovakia) | Dominik Michalica | F | 26 June 1993 | 2014 | Myjava, Slovakia |
| 15 | (France) | François Moretti | F | 5 October 1989 | 2010 | Saint-Pol-sur-Mer, France |
| 13 | (Finland) | Kai Öhberg (A) | D | 13 October 1979 | 2014 | Helsinki, Finland |
| 1 | (France) | Niels-Erik Ravn | G | 15 August 1989 | 2014 | Aix-en-Provence, France |
| 27 | (France) | Lionel Simon | D | 18 September 1980 | 2014 | Villingen-Schwenningen, West Germany |
| 38 | (France) | Victor Thery | F | 1995 | 2013 | Dunkerque, France |
| 16 | (France) | Clément Thomas | F | 25 December 1983 | 2003 | Dijon, France |
| 7 | (Canada) | Adam Young | D | 31 January 1989 | 2014 | Edmonton, Alberta, Canada |

=== Staff ===
- François Rozenthal – Header coach and general manager
- Franck Vanwormhoudt - President
