= 2008–09 Ligue Magnus season =

French professional ice hockey season

The 2008–09 Ligue Magnus season was the 88th season of the Ligue Magnus, the top level of ice hockey in France. 14 teams participated in the league, and Brûleurs de Loups de Grenoble won their sixth league title.

== Regular season ==
	Team	GP	W	OTW	T	OTL	L	Pts	GF	GA	Diff
1	Diables Rouges de Briançon	26	23	1	0	1	1	49	152	61	+91
2	Brûleurs de Loups de Grenoble	26	19	3	0	1	3	45	125	68	+57
3	Dragons de Rouen	26	18	2	0	2	4	42	129	70	+59
4	Ducs d'Angers	26	17	2	0	1	6	39	133	95	+38
5	Gothiques d'Amiens	26	14	3	0	1	8	35	135	88	+47
6	Dauphins d'Épinal	26	11	2	0	4	9	30	103	101	+2
7	Étoile noire de Strasbourg	26	9	3	0	3	11	26	87	94	-7
8	Pingouins de Morzine	26	10	1	0	3	12	25	92	100	-8
9	Ours de Villard-de-Lans	26	8	2	0	2	14	22	80	99	-19
10	Diables Noirs de Tours	26	8	1	0	4	13	22	87	114	-27
11	Chamois de Chamonix	26	4	4	0	1	17	17	83	141	-58
12	Ducs de Dijon	26	5	0	0	4	17	14	79	125	-46
13	Avalanche Mont-Blanc	26	3	3	0	1	19	13	69	132	-63
14	Bisons de Neuilly-sur-Marne	26	5	1	0	0	20	12	85	151	-66

== Playoffs ==
1/8 finals
1	Diables Rouges de Briançon
Bye
8	Pingouins de Morzine	2
9	Ours de Villard-de-Lans	1
4	Ducs d'Angers
Bye
5	Gothiques d'Amiens	2
12	Ducs de Dijon	1
2	Brûleurs de Loups de Grenoble
Bye
7	Étoile noire de Strasbourg	2
10	Diables Noirs de Tours	0
3	Dragons de Rouen
Bye
6	Dauphins d'Épinal	2
11	Chamois de Chamonix	1

Quarterfinals
1	Diables Rouges de Briançon	3
8	Pingouins de Morzine	0
4	Ducs d'Angers	3
5	Gothiques d'Amiens	2
2	Brûleurs de Loups de Grenoble	3
7	Étoile noire de Strasbourg	1
3	Dragons de Rouen	3
6	Dauphins d'Épinal	0

Semifinals
1	Diables Rouges de Briançon	3
4	Ducs d'Angers	2
2	Brûleurs de Loups de Grenoble	3
3	Dragons de Rouen	0

Final
1	Diables Rouges de Briançon	1
2	Brûleurs de Loups de Grenoble	3

== Relegation ==
- Avalanche Mont-Blanc - Bisons de Neuilly-sur-Marne 3:1 (6:2, 4:1, 3:4 OT, 5:1)
