= 2007–08 Ligue Magnus season =

French professional ice hockey season

The 2007–08 Ligue Magnus season was the 87th season of the Ligue Magnus, the top level of ice hockey in France. 14 teams participated in the league, and Dragons de Rouen won their ninth league title.

== Regular season ==
	Team	GP	W	OTW	T	OTL	L	Pts	GF	GA	Diff
1	Dragons de Rouen	26	22	0	0	1	3	45	161	70	91
2	Diables Rouges de Briançon	26	19	2	0	2	3	44	119	62	57
3	Brûleurs de Loups de Grenoble	26	16	4	0	1	5	41	118	72	46
4	Ducs d'Angers	26	19	0	0	2	5	40	128	73	55
5	Pingouins de Morzine	26	13	3	0	1	9	33	97	81	16
6	Gothiques d'Amiens	26	11	2	0	3	10	29	80	89	-9
7	Diables Noirs de Tours	26	11	3	0	0	12	28	91	84	7
8	Ducs de Dijon	26	11	1	0	1	13	25	79	98	-19
9	Dauphins d'Épinal	26	9	3	0	1	13	25	91	100	-9
10	Ours de Villard-de-Lans	26	6	3	0	3	14	21	75	105	-30
11	Avalanche Mont-Blanc	26	6	2	0	4	14	20	62	102	-40
12	Étoile noire de Strasbourg	26	7	1	0	2	16	18	67	100	-33
13	Chamois de Chamonix	26	5	1	0	2	18	14	72	119	-47
14	Drakkars de Caen	26	2	0	0	2	22	6	50	135	-85

== Playoffs ==
1/8 finals
1	Dragons de Rouen
Bye
8	Dauphins d'Épinal	0
9	Ducs de Dijon	2
4	Ducs d'Angers
Bye
5	Pingouins de Morzine	2
12	Étoile noire de Strasbourg	0
2	Diables Rouges de Briançon
Bye
7	Diables Noirs de Tours	2
10	Ours de Villard-de-Lans	0
3	Brûleurs de Loups de Grenoble
Bye
6	Gothiques d'Amiens	1
11	Avalanche Mont-Blanc	2

Quarterfinals
1	Dragons de Rouen	3
9	Ducs de Dijon	0
4	Ducs d'Angers	3
5	Pingouins de Morzine	2
2	Diables Rouges de Briançon	3
7	Diables Noirs de Tours	0
3	Brûleurs de Loups de Grenoble	3
11	Avalanche Mont-Blanc	0

Semifinals
1	Dragons de Rouen	3
4	Ducs d'Angers	0
2	Diables Rouges de Briançon	3
3	Brûleurs de Loups de Grenoble	0

Final
1	Dragons de Rouen	3
2	Diables Rouges de Briançon	0

== Relegation ==
- Chamonix Hockey Club - Hockey Club de Caen 3:2 (4:5, 7:6 OT, 5:4 SO, 3:5, 6:2)
