= 2006–07 Ligue Magnus season =

French professional ice hockey season

The 2006–07 Ligue Magnus season was the 86th season of the Ligue Magnus, the top level of ice hockey in France. 14 teams participated in the league, and Brûleurs de Loups de Grenoble won their fifth league title.

== Regular season ==
	Team	GP	W	OTW	T	OTL	L	Pts	GF	GA	Diff
1	Pingouins de Morzine	26	17	5	0	1	3	45	114	80	+34
2	Brûleurs de Loups de Grenoble	26	17	2	1	4	2	43	112	63	+49
3	Briançon	26	20	1	0	1	4	43	140	67	+73
4	Dragons de Rouen	26	17	3	1	0	5	41	146	77	+69
5	Ducs d'Angers	26	11	3	0	1	10	31	105	94	+11
6	Gothiques d'Amiens	26	16	0	1	1	8	28	106	97	+9
7	Chamois de Chamonix	26	10	0	2	1	13	23	90	99	-9
8	Ours de Villard-de-Lans	26	9	0	0	1	16	19	96	117	-21
9	Avalanche Mont-Blanc	26	6	1	1	4	14	19	70	108	-38
10	Dauphins d'Épinal	26	8	0	0	2	16	18	94	112	-18
11	Drakkars de Caen	26	6	1	1	3	15	18	63	101	-38
12	Étoile noire de Strasbourg	26	6	2	1	1	16	18	89	110	-21
13	Ducs de Dijon	26	7	3	1	1	14	13	85	109	-24
14	Orques d'Anglet	26	5	0	1	0	20	11	64	140	-76

== Playoffs ==
1/8 finals
1	Pingouins de Morzine
Bye
8	Ours de Villard-de-Lans	2
9	Avalanche Mont-Blanc	0
4	Dragons de Rouen
Bye
5	Ducs d'Angers	2
12	Étoile noire de Strasbourg	0
2	Brûleurs de Loups de Grenoble
Bye
7	Chamois de Chamonix	2
10	Dauphins d'Épinal	0
3	Diables Rouges de Briançon
Bye
6	Gothiques d'Amiens	2
11	Drakkars de Caen	0

Quarterfinals
1	Pingouins de Morzine	3
8	Ours de Villard-de-Lans	1
4	Dragons de Rouen	3
5	Ducs d'Angers	1
2	Brûleurs de Loups de Grenoble	3
7	Chamois de Chamonix	0
3	Diables Rouges de Briançon	3
6	Gothiques d'Amiens	0

Semifinals
1	Pingouins de Morzine	3
4	Dragons de Rouen	1
2	Brûleurs de Loups de Grenoble	3
3	Diables Rouges de Briançon	2

Final
1	Pingouins de Morzine	1
2	Brûleurs de Loups de Grenoble	3

== Relegation ==
=== Round 1 ===
- Ducs de Dijon - Anglet Hormadi Élite 4:1 (5:3, 4:1, 1:4, 5:1, 7:4)

=== Round 2 ===
- Gap Hockey Club - Ducs de Dijon 0:2/2:5
