= Yétis du Mont-Blanc =

- City: Saint-Gervais and Megève (France)
- League: Division 1 (2011-present)
- Founded: 1986
- Home arena: Patinoire de Saint-Gervais Patinoire de Megève (capacity: 1800 & 2900)
- Colours
- President: Patrick Sanias
- Head coach: Christophe Lepers
- Website: www.hcmontblanc.com

The St. Gervais-Megève Hockey Club (also known as Yétis du Mont-Blanc) is a French ice hockey club that plays in Division 1, France's second-highest ice hockey league. They formed as a merger of clubs Megève and Saint-Gervais.

== History ==
The team was founded in 1986 and plays home games at the arenas of Saint-Gervais and Megève.

They won two French championships in 1987 and 1988, the first two seasons after the merger. Additionally, Megève was champion in 1984 and Saint-Gervais in 1969, 1974, 1975, 1983, 1985, and 1986.

Former nickname : Avalanche Mont-Blanc.

== Former players ==
(Canada)

- Matt Amado
- Brandon Card (Goalie)
- Jean-Philippe Carey
- Alexandre Gagnon
- Jonathan Provencher

(Czech Republic)

- Ales Cerny

(France)

- Mathias Arnaud
- Numa Besson
- Henri-Corentin Buysse
- Sébastien Borini
- Arthur Cocar
- Christopher Lepers
- Clément Masson
- Alexandre Vincent

(Latvia)

- Edgars Adamovičs

(Slovakia)

- Garip Saliji

== Former coaches ==
- Ari Salo
