= Pingouins de Morzine-Avoriaz =

French ice hockey team

Hockey Club Morzine-Avoriaz
- City: Morzine
- League: French Ice Hockey Federation
- Division: Division 1; 2022-present Ligue Magnus; 2004-2016
- Founded: 1963; 63 years ago
- Home arena: Škoda Arena (capacity: 1280)
- Colours: Red, gold and black
- President: (France) Thierry Coffy
- Head coach: (France) Anthony Mortas
- Website: www.hockey-morzine.com

Hockey Club Morzine-Avoriaz (HCMA), also known as Pingouins de Morzine-Avoriaz (French for 'Morzine-Avoriaz Penguins'), is a French ice hockey team based in Morzine. They currently play in Division 1, having last played in the Ligue Magnus in the 2015/2016 season.

== History ==
The team was founded in 1963. They merged with Chamonix HC to form Pionniers De Chamonix-Morzine in 2016, a partnership that ended in 2017 with a return to Division 3 for HCMA.

== Stadium ==
The team plays home games at the Škoda Arena.

== Coaches ==
- Stéphane Gros

== Former players ==
(France)

- Romain Bonnefond
- Benjamin Dieu de Fauvel
- Laurent Gras
- Julien Lebey
- Florian Hardy
- Maxime Michaud
- Mathieu Mille
- Nicolas Pousset
- Jonathan Zwikel

(Finland)

- Mika Halava
- Toni Kluuskeri
- Antti Koponen
