= Ducs de Dijon =

- Nickname: Ducs (Dukes)
- City: Dijon, France
- League: FFHG Division 3
- Founded: 1969
- Folded: 2018
- Home arena: Patinoire Trimolet (capacity: 1200)
- Colours: Maroon, gold, white

The Ducs de Dijon was a French ice hockey team based in Dijon. They played in the Ligue Magnus from 2002 until declaring bankruptcy in 2017. The team was founded in 1969 and played their home games at the Patinoire Trimolet. In 2018, the club folded. After their disbandment, a new professional team was founded called Hockey Club Dijon who also used the 'Ducs' moniker.

== League affiliation ==
- FFHG Division 1 1971–1973
- FFHG Division 2 1973–1975 (promoted)
- FFHG Division 1 1975–1986 (relegated)
- FFHG Division 2 1986–1988 (promoted)
- FFHG Division 1 1988–1989 (bankruptcy)
- FFHG Division 3 1980–1990 (promoted)
- FFHG Division 2 1990–2000 (promoted)
- FFHG Division 1 2000–2002 (promoted)
- Ligue Magnus 2002–2017 (bankruptcy)
- FFHG Division 2 2017–2018 (folded)

== Awards since 2000 ==
Team Trophy for the most fair-play: 2002-2003

Coupe de France Winner (2) : 2006, 2012.

Finalist of the Coupe de France: 2008-2009
