= Gothiques d'Amiens =

- Nickname: Gothiques (Gothics)
- City: Amiens, France
- League: Ligue Magnus; 1982-Present
- Founded: 1967
- Home arena: Coliséum (capacity: 3400)
- Colours
- Owner: Patrick Letellier
- Head coach: Mario Richer
- Captain: Zachary Lavigne
- Website: Les Gothiques

Franchise history
- Hockey Club Amiens Somme: Amiens Sporting Club (1967-90)

Hockey Club Amiens Somme is a French ice hockey team based in Amiens playing in the Ligue Magnus. The team is also known as "Gothiques d'Amiens" (Amiens Gothics).

The team was founded in 1967 and plays home games at the Coliséum. They have twice been Magnus Cup champions, and have played in the top league since 1982.

Currently the club president is Patrick Letellier, and the head coach is Mario Richer.

== Roster ==
Updated 3 November 2024.

No.	Nat	Player	Pos	S/G	Age	Acquired	Birthplace
4	(Canada)	Justin Bergeron (A)	D	L	25	2023	Magog, Quebec, Canada
34	(France)	Noa Besson	F	L	19	2024	Creil, France
9	(Slovenia)	Kristjan Čepon	D	L	30	2024	Ljubljana, Slovenia
73	(France)	Ilies Djemel	RW	L	22	2022	Le Havre, France
20	(France)	Clement Fouquerel	G	L	35	2023	Caen, France
97	(France)	Gauthier Gibert	RW	R	28	2024	Compiègne, France
1	(Canada)	Taran Kozun	G	L	31	2024	Nipawin, Saskatchewan, Canada
63	(Finland)	Jesper Larinmaa	C	L	27	2024	Turku, Finland
61	(Canada)	Zachary Lavigne (C)	LW	L	27	2023	Drummondville, Quebec, Canada
5	(Canada)	Jordan Lepage	D	R	26	2024	Rimouski, Quebec, Canada
29	(Slovenia)	Aleksandar Magovac	D	R	35	2024	Jesenice, Slovenia
18	(France)	Bastien Maïa (A)	RW	R	28	2023	Rouen, France
12	(France)	Rudy Matima	LW	L	28	2024	Ivry-sur-Seine, France
43	(France)	Mathieu Mony	D	L	26	2023	Rouen, France
14	(Canada)	James Phelan (A)	F	L	29	2024	Laval, Quebec, Canada
11	(France)	Antonin Plagnat	LW	R	25	2019	Morzine, France
26	(France)	Guillaume Roussel	D	L	24	2024	Neuilly-Plaisance, France
72	(Latvia)	Jānis Švanenbergs	C	R	24	2023	Riga, Latvia
19	(Canada)	Julien Tessier (A)	C	L	27	2023	Saint-Marc-des-Carrières, Quebec, Canada
–	(France)	Ugo Tocquin	F	L	21	2024	Amiens, France

== Awards and trophies ==
Ligue Magnus
Champion 1999, 2004.
Charles Ramsay Trophy
Juha Jokiharju in 2001, François Rozenthal in 2004, Danick Bouchard in 2014
Albert Hassler Trophy
Pierre Pousse in 1993, Maurice Rozenthal in 1999, Laurent Gras in 2003, Kevin Hecquefeuille in 2011
Jean Ferrand Trophy
Frédéric Mallétroit in 1985 and 1986, Antoine Mindjimba in 1995, Billy Thompson in 2011
Jean-Pierre Graff Trophy
François Dusseau in 1987, Laurent Gras in 1997, Kevin Hecquefeuille in 2003, Henri-Corentin Buysse in 2008, Fabien Kazarine in 2015
Camil Gélinas Trophy
Antoine Richer in 2004
Marcel Claret Trophy
Winners in 1991, 1996, 1997, 2000, and 2002
Raymond Dewas Trophy
Vladimir Loubkine in 1989, Patrick Foliot in 1990 and 1991

== Notable coaches ==
- Jean Bégin

== Notable players ==
- Mathieu Brisebois
- Michel Galarneau
- Landry Macrez
- François Rozenthal
- Maurice Rozenthal

=== Retired numbers ===
- 3 Keith Vella
- 10 Dave Henderson
- 22 Anthony Mortas
- 25 Antoine Richer
- 27 Michel Breistroff
- 31 Antoine Mindjimba

Denis Perez also had his 64 retired, but the honor was rescinded after he sued the club over his release.

== Logos ==
Logo used until 2009.
