= 1968–69 1re série season =

French professional ice hockey season

The 1968–69 1re série season was the 48th season of the 1re série, the top level of ice hockey in France. Sporting Hockey Club Saint Gervais won their first league title.

== Final ranking ==
- 1st place: Sporting Hockey Club Saint Gervais
- 2nd place: Chamonix Hockey Club
- 3rd place: Gap Hockey Club
- 4th place: Ours de Villard-de-Lans
- 5th place: Athletic Club de Boulogne-Billancourt
- 6th place: US Métro
- 7th place: Français Volants
- 8th place: ?
- 9th place: CPM Croix
- 10th place: Diables Rouges de Briançon
- 11th place: ?
- 12th place: Courchevel
- 13th place: ?
- 14th place: Club des Sports de Megève
- 15th place: CSG Paris
- 16th place: Club des patineurs lyonnais
- 17th place: ?
- 18th place: Pralognan-la-Vanoise
- 19th place: Les Houches
- 20th place: Grenoble UNI
- 21st place: ASPP Paris
- 22nd place: Pingouins de Morzine
- 23rd place: Hockey Club de Reims
- 24th place: Embrun
