= 1969–70 1re série season =

French professional ice hockey season

The 1969–70 1re série season was the 49th season of the 1re série, the top level of ice hockey in France. Chamonix Hockey Club won their 25th league title.

== Final ranking ==
- 1st place: Chamonix Hockey Club
- 2nd place: Sporting Hockey Club Saint Gervais
- 3rd place: Ours de Villard-de-Lans
- 4th place: Athletic Club de Boulogne-Billancourt
- 5th place: Gap Hockey Club
- 6th place: US Métro
- 7th place: Français Volants
- 8th place: CPM Croix
- 9th place: CSG Grenoble
- 10th place: Club des Sports de Megève
- 11th place: CSG Paris
- 12th place: Diables Rouges de Briançon
- 13th place: ?
- 14th place: ?
- 15th place: Club des patineurs lyonnais
- 16th place: ?
- 17th place: ASPP Paris
- 18th place: Hockey Club de Reims
- 19th place: ?
- 20th place: Pralognan-la-Vanoise
- 21st place: Les Houches
- 22nd place: HC Amiens Somme
- 23rd place: Grenoble UNI
