= 1972–73 1re série season =

French professional ice hockey season

The 1972–73 1re série season was the 52nd season of the 1re série, the top level of ice hockey in France. Chamonix Hockey Club won their 28th league title.

== Final ranking ==
- 1st place: Chamonix Hockey Club
- 2nd place: Viry-Châtillon Essonne Hockey
- 3rd place: Ours de Villard-de-Lans
- 4th place: Sporting Hockey Club Saint Gervais
- 5th place: Gap Hockey Club
- 6th place: Français Volants
- 7th place: CSG Grenoble
- 8th place: Club des Sports de Megève
- 9th place: Club des patineurs lyonnais
- 10th place: CPM Croix
