= 1976–77 Nationale A season =

French professional ice hockey season

The 1976–77 Nationale A season was the 56th season of the Nationale A, the top level of ice hockey in France. 10 teams participated in the league, and Gap Hockey Club won their first league title. Diables Rouges de Briançon and Club des patineurs lyonnais were relegated to the Nationale B.

== Regular season ==
| | Club | GP | W | T | L | Pts |
|---|---|---|---|---|---|---|
| 1. | Gap Hockey Club | 18 | 15 | 0 | 3 | 30 |
| 2. | CSG Grenoble | 18 | 13 | 2 | 3 | 28 |
| 3. | Chamonix Hockey Club | 18 | 11 | 2 | 5 | 24 |
| 4. | Ours de Villard-de-Lans | 18 | 11 | 1 | 6 | 23 |
| 5. | Club des Sports de Megève | 18 | 9 | 2 | 7 | 20 |
| 6. | Viry-Châtillon Essonne Hockey | 18 | 9 | 0 | 9 | 18 |
| 7. | Sporting Hockey Club Saint Gervais | 18 | 8 | 1 | 9 | 17 |
| 8. | CPM Croix | 18 | 6 | 1 | 11 | 13 |
| 9. | Diables Rouges de Briançon | 18 | 2 | 1 | 15 | 5 |
| 10. | Club des patineurs lyonnais | 18 | 1 | 0 | 17 | 2 |

== Relegation ==
| | Club | Pts |
|---|---|---|
| 1. | Hockey Club de Caen | 4 |
| 2. | ASG Tours | 3 |
| 3. | Diables Rouges de Briançon | 3 |
| 4. | Club des patineurs lyonnais | 2 |
