= Peter Bessone =

American ice hockey player

- Born: January 13, 1913 New Bedford, Massachusetts, U.S.
- Died: December 5, 1989 (aged 76) Irvine, California, U.S.
- Height: 5 ft 11 in (180 cm)
- Weight: 200 lb (91 kg; 14 st 4 lb)
- Position: Defense
- Shot: Left
- Played for: Young-Sprinters Hockey Club; HC Milan Inter; Racing Club de France; Rapides de Paris; Detroit Red Wings; Stade Français
- National team: United States
- Playing career: 1931–1950
Medal record
Representing United States
Ice hockey
World Championships
Silver medal – second place	1934 Italy

Peter Angelo Bessone (January 13, 1913 — December 5, 1989) was an American ice hockey player and coach. Bessone played 6 games in the National Hockey League with the Detroit Red Wings during the 1937–38 season. The rest of his career, which lasted from 1931 to 1952, was mainly spent in the American Hockey League, though he also spent time in the French, Swiss, and Italian national leagues. Internationally Bessone played for the American national team at the 1934 World Championships, where he won a silver medal. He was inducted into the United States Hockey Hall of Fame in 1978.

== Career ==
=== Early career ===
As a high school student, Pete Bessone was a three-sport athlete at West Springfield, High, playing football, baseball and, ice hockey. Following his completion of high school Bessone began his hockey career locally playing in Springfield, Massachusetts for the West Side Ranges. In 1931 Bessone left the United States to play hockey in France, he joined the Rapides de Paris, leading to a very successful French career. While playing for Stade Français, Bessone was considered the top hockey draw in France and some even called him the Babe Ruth of hockey in Paris.

In 1934 Bessone represented the United States at the World Championships in Milan, Italy. In the semi-final versus Germany, Bessone scored two of the US' three goals. The Americans took the Silver medal finishing only behind Canada.

=== Return to the States ===
Following the 1936 season Bessone returned from France, with the intention of playing professionally in North America. Bessone joined the Pittsburgh Yellowjackets of the EAHL, where he scored six goals and 10 points through 47 games. He so impressed that season that he was offered a contract by the NHL's Detroit Red Wings. Bassone began the 1937–38 season with Detroit Pontiacs, a Red Wings' farm team. Thanks to an injury to Wing's defensemen Ebbie Goodfellow Bessone was called up, making his debut on January 16, 1938 against the Montreal Maroons. After his debut Bessone was believed to be a solid prospect. However, after only six games with the Red Wings and 15 with the Pontiacs Bassone was sent to the Pittsburgh Hornets of the AHL; he would never play in the NHL again.

=== AHL career ===
Bessone continued to play for the Hornets for the next five years. In 1942 Bessone was selected to start in the AHL's first All-star game. The game was held in Cleveland, Ohio, with the intent of to raise money in support of American and Canadian armed forces serving in World War II, the contest raised $4,132 towards this goal. Bessone's long tenure in Pittsburgh finally came to a close in 1943 when the Hornets traded Bessone to the Cleveland Barons for defensemen Fred Robertson.

Bessone spent three seasons in Cleveland. His short time with the Barons however saw the high point of Bessone's career, as the Barons won the 1944-45 Calder Cup as league champions. It was the only North American Championship Bessone would win. After his time in Cleveland Bessone spent one more year in the AHL playing for the Providence Reds.

=== Post-playing career ===
In 1947 Bessone returned to France to be the head coach of the Paris Racing Club hockey team. He coached them for two seasons before returning to the states to coach the Springfield Indians of the IHL he would play 4 games as a player-coach. Following the 1949–50 season Bessone retired from hockey for good.

In 1978 Bessone was inducted into the United States Hockey Hall of fame, 14 years later he was joined by his brother Amo Bessone.

== Career statistics ==
=== Regular season and playoffs ===
			Regular season					Playoffs
Season	Team	League	GP	G	A	Pts	PIM	GP	G	A	Pts	PIM
1931–32	Stade Français	FRA	—	—	—	—	—	—	—	—	—	—
1932–33	Stade Français	FRA	2	3	0	3	2	—	—	—	—	—
1933–34	Rapides de Paris	FRA	2	2	0	2	—	—	—	—	—	—
1934–35	Stade Français	FRA	2	2	0	2	—	—	—	—	—	—
1935–36	Stade Français	FRA	2	1	0	1	—	—	—	—	—	—
1936–37	Pittsburgh Yellowjackets	EAHL	47	6	4	10	53	—	—	—	—	—
1937–38	Detroit Red Wings	NHL	6	0	1	1	6	—	—	—	—	—
1937–38	Detroit Pontiac McLeans	MOHL	15	6	2	8	38	—	—	—	—	—
1937–38	Pittsburgh Hornets	IAHL	16	1	1	2	4	1	0	0	0	0
1938–39	Pittsburgh Hornets	IAHL	53	3	8	11	87	—	—	—	—	—
1939–40	Pittsburgh Hornets	IAHL	54	4	8	12	100	9	0	2	2	20
1940–41	Pittsburgh Hornets	AHL	17	0	3	3	22	—	—	—	—	—
1941–42	Pittsburgh Hornets	AHL	53	2	18	20	102	—	—	—	—	—
1942–43	Pittsburgh Hornets	AHL	54	10	16	26	92	2	0	0	0	4
1942–43	Cleveland Barons	AHL	1	0	0	0	0	—	—	—	—	—
1943–44	Cleveland Barons	AHL	50	6	20	26	119	11	0	1	1	6
1944–45	Cleveland Barons	AHL	60	6	26	32	100	12	1	2	3	18
1945–46	Cleveland Barons	AHL	50	2	14	16	88	8	0	0	0	9
1946–47	Providence Reds	AHL	54	4	9	13	94	—	—	—	—	—
1947–48	Racing Club de France	FRA	—	—	—	—	—	—	—	—	—	—
1948–49	Racing Club de France	FRA	—	—	—	—	—	—	—	—	—	—
1949–50	Springfield Indians	AHL	4	0	0	0	2	—	—	—	—	—
1949–50	Young-Sprinters Hockey Club	NLA	—	—	—	—	—	—	—	—	—	—
1950–51	HC Milan Inter	ITA	—	—	—	—	—	—	—	—	—	—
1951–52	Young-Sprinters Hockey Club	NLA	—	—	—	—	—	—	—	—	—	—
IAHL/AHL totals			466	38	123	161	810	43	1	5	6	57
NHL totals			6	0	1	1	6	—	—	—	—	—

=== International ===
Year	Team	Event	GP	G	A	Pts	PIM
1934	United States	WC	4	2	0	2	—
Senior totals			4	2	0	2	—
