= 1978–79 Nationale A season =

French professional ice hockey season

The 1978–79 Nationale A season was the 58th season of the Ligue Magnus, the top level of ice hockey in France. 10 teams participated in the league, and Chamonix Hockey Club won their 30th league title. CPM Croix was relegated to the Nationale B.

== First round ==
| | Club | GP | W | T | L | GF | GA | Pts |
|---|---|---|---|---|---|---|---|---|
| 1. | Chamonix Hockey Club | 18 | 14 | 0 | 4 | 116 | 74 | 28 |
| 2. | Sporting Hockey Club Saint Gervais | 18 | 11 | 1 | 6 | 105 | 82 | 23 |
| 3. | CSG Grenoble | 18 | 11 | 0 | 7 | 99 | 86 | 22 |
| 4. | Viry-Châtillon Essonne Hockey | 18 | 9 | 3 | 6 | 116 | 83 | 21 |
| 5. | ASG Tours | 18 | 10 | 0 | 8 | 115 | 84 | 20 |
| 6. | Club des Sports de Megève | 18 | 9 | 0 | 9 | 94 | 89 | 18 |
| 7. | Ours de Villard-de-Lans | 18 | 8 | 1 | 9 | 93 | 82 | 17 |
| 8. | Gap Hockey Club | 18 | 8 | 1 | 9 | 82 | 106 | 17 |
| 9. | Français Volants | 18 | 6 | 0 | 12 | 87 | 113 | 12 |
| 10. | CPM Croix | 18 | 1 | 0 | 17 | 55 | 163 | 2 |

== Final round ==
| | Club | GP | W | T | L | GF | GA | Pts |
|---|---|---|---|---|---|---|---|---|
| 1. | Chamonix Hockey Club | 10 | 4 | 3 | 3 | 53 | 44 | 50 |
| 2. | ASG Tours | 10 | 6 | 2 | 2 | 72 | 55 | 48 |
| 3. | Sporting Hockey Club Saint Gervais | 10 | 5 | 1 | 4 | 49 | 50 | 45 |
| 4. | Viry-Châtillon Essonne Hockey | 10 | 4 | 1 | 5 | 45 | 53 | 39 |
| 5. | Club des Sports de Megève | 10 | 5 | 0 | 5 | 51 | 51 | 38 |
| 6. | CSG Grenoble | 10 | 2 | 1 | 7 | 41 | 58 | 32 |

== Relegation ==
| | Club | GP | W | T | L | GF | GA | Pts (Bonus) |
|---|---|---|---|---|---|---|---|---|
| 1. | Ours de Villard-de-Lans | 10 | 8 | 0 | 2 | 84 | 54 | 20(4) |
| 2. | Hockey Club de Caen | 10 | 7 | 0 | 3 | 73 | 48 | 14(0) |
| 3. | Gap Hockey Club | 10 | 5 | 0 | 5 | 74 | 63 | 12(2) |
| 4. | Français Volants | 10 | 6 | 0 | 4 | 68 | 73 | 12(0) |
| 5. | Club des patineurs lyonnais | 10 | 4 | 0 | 6 | 51 | 71 | 8(0) |
| 6. | CPM Croix | 10 | 0 | 0 | 10 | 32 | 73 | 0(0) |
