= 1973–74 Série A season =

French ice hockey league season

The 1973–74 Série A season was the 53rd season of the Série A, the top level of ice hockey in France. Sporting Hockey Club Saint Gervais won their second league title.

== Final ranking ==
- 1st place: Sporting Hockey Club Saint Gervais
- 2nd place: Chamonix Hockey Club
- 3rd place: Gap Hockey Club
- 4th place: Ours de Villard-de-Lans
- 5th place: Français Volants
- 6th place: Viry-Châtillon Essonne Hockey
- 7th place: Club des Sports de Megève
- 8th place: CSG Grenoble
- 9th place: Diables Rouges de Briançon
- 10th place: Club des patineurs lyonnais
