= 1975–76 Nationale A season =

French professional ice hockey season

The 1975–76 Nationale A season was the 55th season of the Nationale A, the top level of ice hockey in France. Chamonix Hockey Club won their 29th league title.

== Final ranking ==
- 1st place: Chamonix Hockey Club
- 2nd place: Sporting Hockey Club Saint Gervais
- 3rd place: Gap Hockey Club
- 4th place: Ours de Villard-de-Lans
- 5th place: Club des Sports de Megève
- 6th place: Viry-Châtillon Essonne Hockey
- 7th place: CSG Grenoble
- 8th place: CPM Croix
- 9th place: Français Volants
- 10th place: Diables Rouges de Briançon
