= Pat Daley =

French ice hockey player

- Born: March 27, 1959 (age 67) Marville, France
- Height: 6 ft 1 in (185 cm)
- Weight: 176 lb (80 kg; 12 st 8 lb)
- Position: Left wing
- Shot: Left
- Played for: Winnipeg Jets
- National team: France
- NHL draft: 82nd overall, 1979; Winnipeg Jets
- Playing career: 1979–1994

Patrick Lloyd Daley (born March 27, 1959) is a French-Canadian former professional ice hockey player who played 12 games in the National Hockey League. He played with the Winnipeg Jets. Daley was born in Marville, France, but grew up in Chatham, New Brunswick. Internationally he represented Canada in the 1978 World Junior Ice Hockey Championships, and later his birth country, France, in the 1986 and 1987 World Championships.

== Career statistics ==
=== Regular season and playoffs ===
			Regular season					Playoffs
Season	Team	League	GP	G	A	Pts	PIM	GP	G	A	Pts	PIM
1974–75	James M. Hill Memorial High School	HS-NB	—	—	—	—	—	—	—	—	—	—
1975–76	Laval National	QMJHL	70	9	12	21	40	—	—	—	—	—
1976–77	Laval National	QMJHL	63	23	36	59	135	7	4	3	7	16
1977–78	Laval National	QMJHL	69	44	76	120	174	5	3	3	6	10
1978–79	Montreal Juniors	QMJHL	67	25	50	75	139	11	3	5	8	52
1979–80	Tulsa Oilers	CHL	65	9	16	25	141	3	1	0	1	13
1979–80	Winnipeg Jets	AHL	5	1	0	1	4	—	—	—	—	—
1981–82	Fredericton Express	AHL	71	14	13	27	120	—	—	—	—	—
1982–83	Tours	FRA	—	—	—	—	—	—	—	—	—	—
1983–84	Tours	FRA	40	28	25	53	—	—	—	—	—	—
1984–85	Tours	FRA	32	27	15	42	—	—	—	—	—	—
1985–86	Français Volants Paris	FRA	30	17	15	32	—	—	—	—	—	—
1986–87	Français Volants Paris	FRA	40	27	36	63	—	—	—	—	—	—
1987–88	Gap HC	FRA	30	10	8	18	34	—	—	—	—	—
1988–89	Dragons de Rouen	FRA	40	12	23	35	62	5	2	1	3	0
1989–90	Dragons de Rouen	FRA	30	9	13	22	34	—	—	—	—	—
1990–91	Dragons de Rouen	FRA	27	6	4	10	18	9	1	1	2	6
1993–94	Albatros de Brest	FRA	19	5	1	6	37	6	0	3	3	14
FRA totals			288	141	140	281	—	20	3	5	8	20
NHL totals			12	1	0	1	13	—	—	—	—	—

=== International ===
Year	Team	Event	GP	G	A	Pts	PIM
1978	Canada	WJC	6	3	2	5	2
1986	France	WC-B	7	4	3	7	4
1987	France	WC-B	6	1	3	4	8
Junior totals			6	3	2	5	2
Senior totals			13	5	6	11	12
