= Paulin Bordeleau =

Canadian-born French ice hockey player

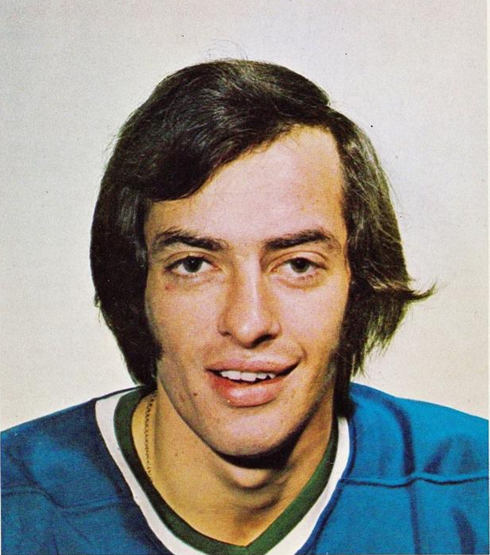
- 1974 headshot of Bordeleau
- Born: January 29, 1953 (age 73) Noranda, Quebec, Canada
- Height: 5 ft 9 in (175 cm)
- Weight: 180 lb (82 kg; 12 st 12 lb)
- Position: Centre
- Shot: Right
- Played for: Vancouver Canucks; Quebec Nordiques; ASG Tours; Megève; Mont-Blanc
- National team: France
- NHL draft: 19th overall, 1973; Vancouver Canucks
- WHA draft: 4th overall, 1973; Toronto Toros
- Playing career: 1973–1988; 1996

Paulin Joseph Bordeleau (born January 29, 1953) is a Canadian-born French former professional ice hockey forward.

== Playing career ==
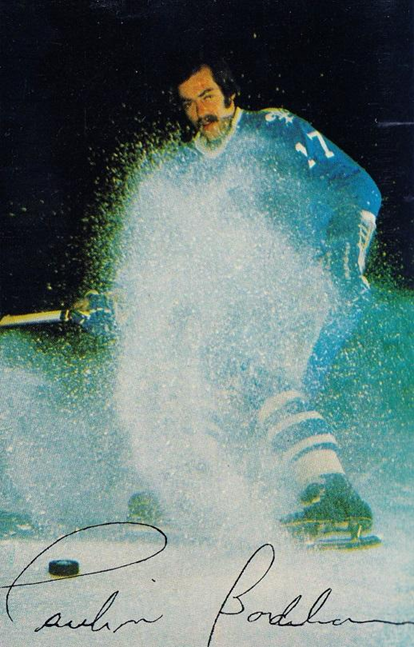
1976 postcard of Bordeleau for Quebec Nordiques

Born in Noranda, Quebec, Bordeleau started his National Hockey League career with the Vancouver Canucks in 1973. He spent his entire NHL career with the Canucks. He left the NHL after the 1976 season and jumped to the World Hockey Association. There, he played for the Quebec Nordiques. He then finished his career in the French Ligue Magnus. He played for France at the 1988 Winter Olympics.

== Personal life ==
His son, Sébastien, was a professional ice hockey player, and his grandson Thomas also plays ice hockey most recently for the St. Louis Blues. His granddaughter Jade plays soccer for the NC State Wolfpack.

Paulin was one of three brothers playing professional hockey in the 1970s with J. P. Bordeleau playing for the Chicago Black Hawks and Christian Bordeleau starring for the Quebec Nordiques of the WHA.

== Career statistics ==
=== Regular season and playoffs ===
			Regular season					Playoffs
Season	Team	League	GP	G	A	Pts	PIM	GP	G	A	Pts	PIM
1967–68	Noranda Copper Kings	QNWJHL	27	15	15	30	21	—	—	—	—	—
1969–70	Montreal Junior Canadiens	OHA	41	18	29	47	48	16	3	6	9	6
1970–71	Toronto Marlboros	OHA	45	27	42	69	69	13	13	11	24	24
1971–72	Toronto Marlboros	OHA	34	34	33	67	37	10	9	7	16	7
1972–73	Toronto Marlboros	OHA	56	54	43	97	26	—	—	—	—	—
1973–74	Vancouver Canucks	NHL	68	11	13	24	20	—	—	—	—	—
1974–75	Vancouver Canucks	NHL	67	17	31	48	21	5	2	1	3	0
1975–76	Vancouver Canucks	NHL	48	5	12	17	6	—	—	—	—	—
1975–76	Tulsa Oilers	CHL	14	5	9	14	11	3	0	0	0	0
1976–77	Quebec Nordiques	WHA	80	42	41	82	52	16	12	9	21	12
1977–78	Quebec Nordiques	WHA	77	42	23	65	29	11	4	6	10	2
1978–79	Quebec Nordiques	WHA	77	17	12	29	44	4	1	0	1	0
1980–81	ASG Tours	FRA	36	43	23	66	—	10	17	9	26	—
1981–82	Megève	FRA	26	33	20	53	—	—	—	—	—	—
1982–83	Megève	FRA	28	44	28	72	—	—	—	—	—	—
1983–84	Megève	FRA	32	39	29	68	—	—	—	—	—	—
1984–85	Megève	FRA	32	16	10	26	—	—	—	—	—	—
1985–86	Megève	FRA	32	22	44	66	—	—	—	—	—	—
1986–87	Mont-Blanc	FRA	36	57	47	104	24	—	—	—	—	—
1987–88	Mont-Blanc	FRA	28	20	22	42	63	—	—	—	—	—
1996–97	Fredericton Canadiens	AHL	3	1	3	4	2	—	—	—	—	—
NHL totals			183	33	56	89	47	5	2	1	3	0
WHA totals			234	101	76	177	125	31	17	15	32	14
FRA totals			250	274	223	497	—	10	17	9	26	—

=== International ===
Year	Team	Event	GP	G	A	Pts	PIM
1986	France	WC-B	7	2	1	3	4
1987	France	WC-B	7	9	6	15	24
1988	France	Oly	6	2	2	4	24
Senior totals			20	13	9	22	52
