= Larry Huras =

Canadian ice hockey player and coach

- Born: July 8, 1955 (age 71) Listowel, Ontario, Canada
- Height: 6 ft 3 in (191 cm)
- Weight: 205 lb (93 kg; 14 st 9 lb)
- Position: Defence
- Shot: Left
- Played for: New York Rangers; CSG Grenoble; Gap Hockey Club; Rouen Hockey Club
- NHL draft: 84th overall, 1975; New York Rangers
- WHA draft: 115th overall, 1975; Indianapolis Racers
- Playing career: 1975–1994

Larry Robert Huras (born July 8, 1955) is a Canadian ice hockey coach and a former player. He played 2 games in the National Hockey League with the New York Rangers during the 1976–77 season. The rest of his career, which lasted from 1975 to 1994, was mainly spent in the French league. After his playing career Huras turned to coaching, and spent several years in the Nationalliga A, the top league in Switzerland.

== Playing career ==
Huras turned pro in 1975, when he was picked by the New York Rangers in the 1975 NHL Amateur Draft (5th round, 84th overall). He spent time in the International Hockey League (IHL) and American Hockey League (AHL), before his National Hockey League (NHL) debut on February 27, 1977 with the Rangers, for whom he played his only two NHL games. In the following three seasons, he strengthened the roster of Salt Lake Golden Eagles and Dallas Black Hawks of the Central Hockey League (CHL), followed by a stint with the Port Huron Flags in the IHL.

In 1980, Huras signed with Grenoble métropole hockey 38 in France. He spent three years with the club, before heading to another French team, Gap Hockey Club. He transferred to the Dragons de Rouen in 1988 and captured four French national championships in six years with the club, three of them as a player-coach.

== Coaching career ==
After his Rouen player-coach tenure, including three French championships, Huras was named head coach of Zürcher SC of the Swiss elite league NLA in 1994, where he remained at the helm for two years. During the 1996-97 season, he was hired by fellow NLA side HC Ambri-Piotta. Under his guidance, Ambri completed the 1998-99 regular season on top of the table before losing the finals to HC Lugano. He received Switzerland Coach of the Year honors that season. Huras guided the team to semifinal appearances in 1997-98 and 1999-00 and also established the club on the international stage, winning two IIHF Continental Cup titles (1998 and 1999) as well as the 1999 IIHF Super Cup with the team. Ambri and Huras did not come to terms on a new contract in 2000, so he accepted an offer to return to Zürcher SC for a second stint in charge at the club. At ZSC, he added to his title haul, winning the 2001 Swiss national championship and the IIHF Continental Cup. He was sacked in November 2001, after suffering defeat in eleven of 23 games since the beginning of the 2001-02 campaign.

Huras stayed in the Swiss NLA and was appointed head coach of HC Lugano prior to the 2002-03 season. He led the team to the Swiss championship his first year and to the finals in 2003-04. Huras was relieved of his duties during the 2006 playoffs quarterfinals and replaced by Harold Kreis, who went on to win the title with the team.

For a second time in his career, he took over head coaching duties at HC Ambri-Piotta in November 2006. He pulled the team away from the bottom of the National League A and managed to keep Ambri in the league.

After stints with the Stavanger Oilers of Norway (2007–08) and Villacher SV of Austria (2008–09), Huras was back in Switzerland, taking the helm of SC Bern in 2009. He had immediate success, guiding SCB to the NLA title his first year. In his second season, Bern reached the semifinals. Huras was removed from the position in October 2011, his third year at the helm, because the club executives wanted a "more attractive style of ice hockey". Only a couple of days later, he returned for a second spell at HC Lugano. His tenure ended at the end of the 2012-13 season.

In November 2013, Huras joined the coaching staff of EHC München of the German DEL, serving as an assistant to Pierre Pagé. He was named head coach of then reigning German champion ERC Ingolstadt for the 2014-15 season and guided the Panthers to another appearance in the DEL finals, where they fell short to Adler Mannheim.

Huras parted ways with Ingolstadt after one year and took the head coaching job at Modo Hockey in Sweden's SHL. Following a bad start to the 2015-16 season, collecting ten points from the opening 15 games and losing seven straight games, Huras and his staff were sacked in November 2015. In late September 2016, he was named head coach of HC Fribourg-Gottéron of the NLA, replacing Gerd Zenhäusern. Huras guided Fribourg to a semifinal appearance in the Champions Hockey League in the 2016-17 season where they fell short to Frölunda HC. In the NLA, his team did not qualify for the play-offs, Huras and Fribourg parted company after the season.

== Private life ==
Huras is married and has two sons and one daughter. His hobbies are water skiing, skiing, golf, fishing, reading and music.

== Career statistics ==
=== Regular season and playoffs ===
			Regular season					Playoffs
Season	Team	League	GP	G	A	Pts	PIM	GP	G	A	Pts	PIM
1971–72	Elmira Sugar Kings	WOHL	—	—	—	—	—	—	—	—	—	—
1972–73	Kitchener Rangers	OHA	60	0	7	7	55	—	—	—	—	—
1973–74	Kitchener Rangers	OHA	67	4	22	26	83	—	—	—	—	—
1974–75	Kitchener Rangers	OMJHL	68	4	28	32	166	—	—	—	—	—
1975–76	Port Huron Flags	IHL	17	3	9	12	49	—	—	—	—	—
1975–76	Providence Reds	AHL	55	0	12	12	102	3	0	1	1	9
1976–77	New York Rangers	NHL	2	0	0	0	0	—	—	—	—	—
1976–77	New Haven Nighthawks	AHL	48	0	6	6	82	4	0	0	0	0
1977–78	Salt Lake Golden Eagles	CHL	52	5	7	12	55	1	0	0	0	0
1978–79	Salt Lake Golden Eagles	CHL	32	1	9	10	52	—	—	—	—	—
1978–79	Dallas Black Hawks	CHL	6	0	1	1	21	—	—	—	—	—
1979–80	Port Huron Flags	IHL	77	3	28	31	106	11	1	1	2	27
1980–81	CSG Grenoble	FRA	10	1	8	9	—	—	—	—	—	—
1981–82	Grenoble	FRA	28	5	16	21	—	—	—	—	—	—
1982–83	Grenoble	FRA	27	5	15	20	—	—	—	—	—	—
1983–84	Gap Hockey Club	FRA	28	6	14	20	—	—	—	—	—	—
1984–85	Gap Hockey Club	FRA	32	4	14	18	—	—	—	—	—	—
1985–86	Gap Hockey Club	FRA	24	8	4	12	—	—	—	—	—	—
1986–87	Gap Hockey Club	FRA	32	8	22	30	—	—	—	—	—	—
1987–88	Gap Hockey Club	FRA	33	5	13	18	44	—	—	—	—	—
1988–89	Rouen	FRA	42	2	21	23	48	—	—	—	—	—
1989–90	Rouen	FRA	27	1	5	6	18	2	0	0	0	0
1990–91	Rouen	FRA	28	1	6	7	18	9	2	2	4	6
1991–92	Rouen	FRA	24	0	4	4	30	—	—	—	—	—
1992–93	Rouen	FRA	1	0	0	0	0	—	—	—	—	—
1993–94	Rouen	FRA	9	0	2	2	12	—	—	—	—	—
FRA totals			345	46	144	190	—	11	2	2	4	6
NHL totals			2	0	0	0	0	—	—	—	—	—

== Awards and achievements ==
=== As player ===
- France Championship: 1981, 1982 (Grenoble), 1990 (Rouen)

=== As coach ===
- France Championship: 1992, 1993, 1994, 1995 (Rouen) (player-coach)
- Switzerland Coach of Year: 1998–99 (HC Ambri-Piotta)
- Winner of the Continental Cup and the Super Cup with Hockey Club Ambrì Piotta in 2000
- Switzerland Championship: 2001 (ZSC Lions), 2003 (HC Lugano), 2010 (SC Bern) (as head coach)
