= 1966–67 1re série season =

French professional ice hockey season

The 1966–67 1re série season was the 46th season of the 1re série, the top level of ice hockey in France. Chamonix Hockey Club won their 23rd league title.

== Final ranking ==
- 1st place: Chamonix Hockey Club
- 2nd place: Ours de Villard-de-Lans
- 3rd place: Athletic Club de Boulogne-Billancourt
- 4th place: Sporting Hockey Club Saint Gervais
- 5th place: US Métro
- 6th place: Français Volants
- 7th place: Gap Hockey Club
- 8th place: CPM Croix
- 9th place: ?
- 10th place: Diables Rouges de Briançon
- 11th place: ?
- 12th place: ?
- 13th place: CSG Paris
- 14th place: Les Houches
- 15th place: ?
- 16th place: Pralognan-la-Vanoise
- 17th place: ASPP Paris
- 18th place: Grenoble UNI
- 19th place: Pingouins de Morzine
