= 1959–60 1re série season =

French professional ice hockey season

The 1959–60 1re série season was the 39th season of the 1re série, the top level of ice hockey in France. Athletic Club de Boulogne-Billancourt won their second league title.

== Final ranking ==
- 1st place: Athletic Club de Boulogne-Billancourt
- 2nd place: Chamonix Hockey Club
- 3rd place: US Métro
- 4th place: Ours de Villard-de-Lans
- 5th place: Paris HC
- 6th place: Diables Rouges de Briançon
- 7th place: Racing Club de France
- 8th place: ?
- 9th place: ?
- 10th place: ?
- 11th place: Sporting Hockey Club Saint Gervais
- 12th place Gap Hockey Club
- 13th place: ?
- 14th place: ?
- 15th place: Club des Sports de Megève
