= 1954–55 1re série season =

French professional ice hockey season

The 1954–55 1re série season was the 34th season of the 1re série, the top level of ice hockey in France. Chamonix Hockey Club won their 15th league title.

== Final ranking ==
- 1st place: Chamonix Hockey Club
- 2nd place: Paris Université Club
- 3rd place: CSG Paris
- 4th place: Club des patineurs lyonnais
- 5th place: Ours de Villard-de-Lans
- 6th place: Diables Rouges de Briançon
- 7th place: US Métro
- 8th place: Radio Tout Sport
- 9th place: Gap Hockey Club
- 10th place: Sporting Hockey Club Saint Gervais
- 11th place ?
- 12th place: ?
- 13th place: ASPP Paris
- 14th place: Club des Sports de Megève
- 15th place: Athletic Club de Boulogne-Billancourt
- 16th place: ?
- 17th place: ?
- 18th place: Central HC
