= André Peloffy =

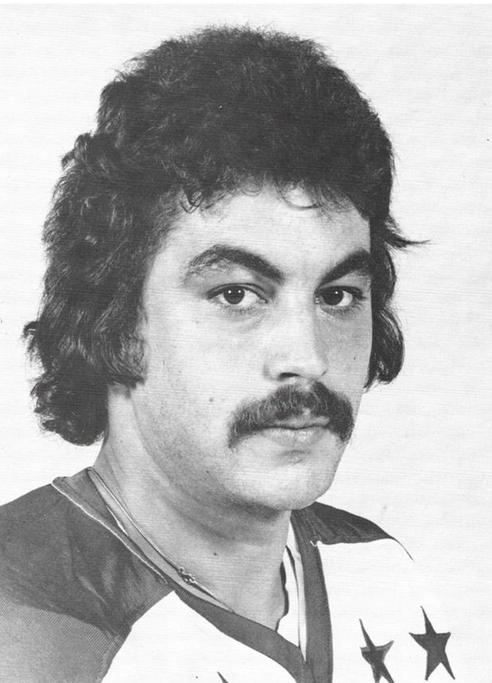
- Peloffy in 1974 photo
- Born: February 25, 1951 (age 75) Sète, France
- Height: 5 ft 8 in (173 cm)
- Weight: 160 lb (73 kg; 11 st 6 lb)
- Position: Centre
- Shot: Left
- Played for: Washington Capitals; New England Whalers; Tours; EC VSV; SC Saint-Gervais; Français Volants
- National team: France
- NHL draft: 111th overall, 1971; New York Rangers
- Playing career: 1971–1990

André Charles Peloffy (born February 25, 1951) is a French former professional ice hockey forward. He was the first person born in France to play in the National Hockey League (NHL), and played 9 games with the Washington Capitals during the 1974–75 season. He also played 10 games in the World Hockey Association with the New England Whalers during the 1977–78 season, and then spent several years in the French league before retiring in 1996. Internationally Peloffy played in several World Championships, as well as the 1988 Winter Olympics.

== Playing career ==
Drafted by the New York Rangers in the 1971 NHL entry draft, Peloffy never played for the Rangers and was traded to the Washington Capitals prior to the 1974–75 NHL season and played nine games during the team's inaugural season. His principal success came in the American Hockey League with the Springfield Indians, Providence Reds and Richmond Robins. He won the John B. Sollenberger Trophy as the AHL's scoring champion with the Springfield Indians in 1976–77.

He would also play 10 games for the New England Whalers of the World Hockey Association.

After his North American hockey career, he played professionally in Europe for ten seasons, and became France's all-time leading scorer in international play, scoring 55 points in 42 games for the national team. He retired after the 1989 season.

== Career statistics ==
=== Regular season and playoffs ===
			Regular season					Playoffs
Season	Team	League	GP	G	A	Pts	PIM	GP	G	A	Pts	PIM
1968–69	Laval Saints	MMJHL	—	—	—	—	—	—	—	—	—	—
1969–70	Laval Saints	QMJHL	56	37	43	80	67	—	—	—	—	—
1970–71	Rosemont National	QMJHL	69	49	69	118	67	—	—	—	—	—
1971–72	New Haven Blades	EHL	42	32	44	76	31	7	2	5	7	0
1971–72	Providence Reds	AHL	2	1	2	3	0	—	—	—	—	—
1972–73	Providence Reds	AHL	62	16	23	39	24	3	2	1	3	2
1973–74	Providence Reds	AHL	26	45	71	52	14	7	5	12	12
1974–75	Washington Capitals	NHL	9	0	0	0	0	—	—	—	—	—
1974–75	Richmond Robins	AHL	62	29	44	73	84	7	0	4	4	2
1975–76	Richmond Robins	AHL	67	29	30	59	78	8	2	1	3	8
1976–77	Springfield Indians	AHL	79	42	57	99	106	—	—	—	—	—
1977–78	New England Whalers	WHA	10	2	0	2	2	2	0	0	0	0
1977–78	Springfield Indians	AHL	33	55	88	73	4	2	3	5	8
1978–79	Springfield Indians	AHL	77	28	48	76	138	—	—	—	—	—
1979–80	ASG Tours	FRA	28	42	24	66	—	—	—	—	—	—
1980–81	EC VSV	AUT	34	45	42	87	79	—	—	—	—	—
1980–81	Springfield Indians	AHL	7	2	0	2	6	6	2	5	7	2
1981–82	EC VSV	AUT	38	44	57	101	94	—	—	—	—	—
1982–83	SC Saint-Gervais	FRA	28	42	45	87	—	—	—	—	—	—
1983–84	SC Saint-Gervais	FRA	28	36	39	75	—	—	—	—	—	—
1984–85	SC Saint-Gervais	FRA	30	25	44	69	—	—	—	—	—	—
1985–86	SC Saint-Gervais	FRA	28	27	50	77	—	—	—	—	—	—
1986–87	SC Saint-Gervais	FRA-2	28	—	—	—	—	—	—	—	—	—
1987–88	Français Volants	FRA	29	30	34	64	20	—	—	—	—	—
1988–89	Français Volants	FRA	38	14	19	33	20	—	—	—	—	—
1989–90	Français Volants	FRA	23	2	4	6	18	—	—	—	—	—
1991–92	Français Volants	FRA-3	—	—	—	—	—	—	—	—	—	—
1995–96	Français Volants	FRA-2	—	—	—	—	—	—	—	—	—	—
FRA totals			256	218	258	476	—	—	—	—	—	—
WHA totals			10	2	0	2	2	2	0	0	0	0
NHL totals			9	0	0	0	0	—	—	—	—	—

=== International ===
Year	Team	Event	GP	G	A	Pts	PIM
1981	France	WC C	7	7	8	15	6
1982	France	WC C	7	7	4	11	6
1983	France	WC C	7	7	11	18	4
1985	France	WC C	1	2	0	2	0
1986	France	WC B	7	3	0	3	0
1987	France	WC B	7	2	2	4	4
1988	France	OLY	6	0	2	2	0
Senior totals			36	28	25	53	20
