= 1957–58 1re série season =

French professional ice hockey season

The 1957–58 1re série season was the 37th season of the 1re série, the top level of ice hockey in France. Chamonix Hockey Club won their 16th league title.

== Final ranking ==
- 1st place: Chamonix Hockey Club
- 2nd place: Athletic Club de Boulogne-Billancourt
- 3rd place: Club des patineurs lyonnais
- 4th place: Ours de Villard-de-Lans
- 5th place: Athletic Club de Boulogne-Billancourt 2
- 6th place: Sporting Hockey Club Saint Gervais
- 7th place: US Métro
- 8th place: ?
- 9th place: ?
- 10th place: Paris HC
