= 1965–66 1re série season =

French professional ice hockey season

The 1965–66 1re série season was the 45th season of the 1re série, the top level of ice hockey in France. Chamonix Hockey Club won their 22nd league title.

== Final ranking ==
- 1st place: Chamonix Hockey Club
- 2nd place: Athletic Club de Boulogne-Billancourt
- 3rd place: CSG Grenoble
- 4th place: Sporting Hockey Club Saint Gervais
- 5th place: Ours de Villard-de-Lans
- 6th place: Gap Hockey Club
- 7th place: Français Volants
- 8th place: Lille
- 9th place: US Métro
- 10th place: ?
- 11th place: ?
- 12th place: Diables Rouges de Briançon
- 13th place: ?
- 14th place: Grenoble UNI
- 15th place: ?
- 16th place: Pralognan-la-Vanoise
- 17th place: ASPP Paris
