= Roland Cloutier =

Canadian ice hockey player (born 1957)

- Born: October 6, 1957 (age 67); Rouyn, Quebec, Canada
- Height: 5 ft 8 in (173 cm)
- Weight: 157 lb (71 kg; 11 st 3 lb)
- Position: Centre
- Shot: Left
- Played for: Detroit Red Wings; Quebec Nordiques; ASG Tours; Gap HC
- NHL draft: 178th overall, 1977; Detroit Red Wings
- WHA draft: 89th overall, 1977; Quebec Nordiques
- Playing career: 1977–1988

Roland Cloutier (born October 6, 1957) is a Canadian former ice hockey centre who played 34 games in the National Hockey League with the Detroit Red Wings and Quebec Nordiques between 1978 and 1980. The rest of his career, which lasted from 1977 to 1988, was mainly spent in the French domestic league. After his playing career he served as a coach of the Val-d'Or Foreurs of the Quebec Major Junior Hockey League between 1996 and 2000.

== Career statistics ==
=== Regular season and playoffs ===
			Regular season					Playoffs
Season	Team	League	GP	G	A	Pts	PIM	GP	G	A	Pts	PIM
1973–74	Rouyn-Noranda Citadelles	QNWJHL	—	—	—	—	—	—	—	—	—	—
1974–75	Rouyn-Noranda Citadelles	QNWJHL	—	—	—	—	—	—	—	—	—	—
1975–76	Trois-Rivieres Draveurs	QMJHL	67	21	34	55	18	10	6	8	14	0
1976–77	Trois-Rivieres Draveurs	QMJHL	72	63	68	131	28	6	2	2	4	2
1977–78	Kansas City Red Wings	CHL	70	18	36	54	13	—	—	—	—	—
1977–78	Detroit Red Wings	NHL	1	0	0	0	0	—	—	—	—	—
1978–79	Kansas City Red Wings	CHL	59	32	29	61	21	4	0	0	0	12
1978–79	Detroit Red Wings	NHL	19	6	6	12	2	—	—	—	—	—
1979–80	Syracuse Firebirds	AHL	64	19	37	56	16	4	1	2	3	7
1979–80	Quebec Nordiques	NHL	14	2	3	5	0	—	—	—	—	—
1980–81	Nova Scotia Voyageurs	AHL	60	18	21	39	41	6	1	1	2	0
1981–82	ASG Tours	FRA	30	27	28	55	—	—	—	—	—	—
1982–83	ASG Tours	FRA	32	32	28	60	—	—	—	—	—	—
1983–84	Gap HC	FRA	32	47	33	80	—	—	—	—	—	—
1984–85	Gap HC	FRA	31	37	31	68	—	—	—	—	—	—
1985–86	Gap HC	FRA	32	41	28	69	—	—	—	—	—	—
1986–87	Gap HC	FRA	33	57	30	87	—	—	—	—	—	—
1987–88	Gap HC	FRA	33	25	18	43	19	—	—	—	—	—
FRA totals			223	266	196	462	—	—	—	—	—	—
NHL totals			34	8	9	17	2	—	—	—	—	—
