= 1958–59 1re série season =

French professional ice hockey season

The 1958–59 1re série season was the 38th season of the 1re série, the top level of ice hockey in France. Chamonix Hockey Club won their 17th league title.

== Final ranking ==
- 1st place: Chamonix Hockey Club
- 2nd place: Athletic Club de Boulogne-Billancourt
- 3rd place: Ours de Villard-de-Lans
- 4th place: St. Didier
- 5th place: US Métro
- 6th place: Diables Rouges de Briançon
- 7th place: Gap Hockey Club
- 8th place: Paris HC
- 9th place: ?
- 10th place: Club des Sports de Megève
