= 1980–81 Nationale A season =

French professional ice hockey season

The 1980–81 Nationale A season was the 60th season of the Nationale A, the top level of ice hockey in France. 10 teams participated in the league, and CSG Grenoble won their first league title.

== First round ==
	Club	GP	W	T	L	GF	GA	Pts
1.	Ours de Villard-de-Lans	18	12	3	3	101	71	27
2.	Chamonix Hockey Club	18	12	1	5	117	72	25
3.	ASG Tours	18	11	3	4	103	84	25
4.	CSG Grenoble	18	10	3	5	106	78	23
5.	Viry-Châtillon Essonne Hockey	18	8	3	7	86	76	19
6.	Club des Sports de Megève	18	9	1	8	95	106	19
7.	Sporting Hockey Club Saint Gervais	18	9	0	9	118	105	18
8.	Gap Hockey Club	18	5	3	10	99	109	13
9.	Hockey Club de Caen	18	3	0	15	53	117	6
10.	Club des patineurs lyonnais	18	1	3	14	72	132	5

== Final round ==
	Club	GP	W	T	L	GF	GA	Pts
1.	CSG Grenoble	10	6	3	1	62	27	53
2.	ASG Tours	10	7	0	3	63	39	53
3.	Chamonix Hockey Club	10	6	1	3	66	52	51
4.	Viry-Châtillon Essonne Hockey	10	5	1	4	37	36	41
5.	Ours de Villard-de-Lans	10	2	1	7	38	53	37
6.	Club des Sports de Megève	10	0	0	10	32	91	19

== Relegation ==
	Club	GP	W	T	L	GF	GA	Pts (Bonus)
1.	Sporting Hockey Club Saint Gervais	8	6	1	1	67	39	17(4)
2.	Gap Hockey Club	8	4	2	2	41	37	12(2)
3.	Hockey Club de Caen	8	3	1	4	47	46	7(0)
4.	Club des patineurs lyonnais	8	3	1	4	39	42	7(0)
5.	Image Club d’Épinal	8	1	1	6	43	73	4(0)
