= 1963–64 1re série season =

French professional ice hockey season

The 1963–64 1re série season was the 43rd season of the 1re série, the top level of ice hockey in France. Six teams participated in the final round, and Chamonix Hockey Club won their 20th league title.

== Final round ==
	Club	Pts
1.	Chamonix Hockey Club	19
2.	Athletic Club de Boulogne-Billancourt	17
3.	Sporting Hockey Club Saint Gervais	12
4.	Ours de Villard-de-Lans	8
5.	Gap Hockey Club	3
6.	Lions de Paris	1
