= 1967–68 1re série season =

French professional ice hockey season

The 1967–68 1re série season was the 47th season of the 1re série, the top level of ice hockey in France. Four teams participated in the final round, and Chamonix Hockey Club won their 24th league title.

== First round ==
=== Paris ===
Français Volants and Athletic Club de Boulogne-Billancourt qualified for the final round.

=== Alpes ===
	Club	GP	W	T	L	GF	GA	Pts
1.	CSG Grenoble	5	4	0	1	21	18	8
2.	Chamonix Hockey Club	3	3	0	0	18	7	6
3.	Sporting Hockey Club Saint Gervais	5	2	0	3	20	22	4
4.	Gap Hockey Club	5	0	0	5	19	31	0

== Final round ==
	Club	GP	W	T	L	GF	GA	Pts
1.	Chamonix Hockey Club	3	2	1	0	17	10	5
2.	CSG Grenoble	3	2	0	1	16	11	4
3.	Athletic Club de Boulogne-Billancourt	3	1	1	1	12	10	3
4.	Français Volants	3	0	0	3	6	20	0
