= Piscine patinoire de Boulogne-Billancourt =

Sports complex in France

Boulogne-Billancourt Pool and Ice Rink
- Piscine patinoire de Boulogne-Billancourt
- Location within Paris
- Interactive map of Boulogne-Billancourt Pool and Ice Rink
- Address: France
- Location: Rives de Seine Quarter
- Coordinates: 48°49′49.87″N 2°14′29.18″E
- Owner: City of Boulogne-Billancourt
- Operator: 4Padel (padel center); Récréa (swimming pool)
- Main venue: Padel center (ice rink until 2024)
- Facilities: Swimming pool
- Acreage: 15,000 m^{2} (160,000 sq ft)

Piscine patinoire de Boulogne-Billancourt (lit. 'Boulogne-Billancourt Pool and Ice Rink') is an administrative ensemble consisting of two neighboring but physically separate sports venues located in Boulogne-Billancourt, Hauts-de-Seine, France, just west of Paris. The ice rink was decommissioned and converted to a padel center in 2025. In its original incarnation, it was home to the ice hockey section of multisports organization Athletic Club Boulogne-Billancourt, one of the sport's most prominent West European representatives in the late 1950s and early 1960s.

== Ice rink ==
Patinoire de Boulogne-Billancourt
- La Fédérale
- Former names: Patinoire fédérale de Boulogne-Billancourt
- Address: 1 rue Victor Griffuelhes
- Capacity: 1630 (seated); 2288 (total)
- Field size: 60 × 30 metre

Construction
- Built: 1953–55 (building); 1957 (stand)
- Opened: 21 December 1955
- Closed: 1 October 2024
- Architect: Louis Saint-Calbre
- Structural engineer: Georges Guyonnaud
- Main contractor: Anciens établissements Eiffel

Tenants
- AC Boulogne-Billancourt (1955–2024); US Métro (195?–1971); CSG Paris/CSG Molitor (1955–1974); ASPP Paris (19??–19??); Paris HC (1955–1961; 196?–196?; 1988–2024); HC Lions de Paris (1961–196?)

=== Development and operations ===
Ice sports have a long history in the Boulogne-Billancourt area, as the lakes of the Bois de Boulogne were a favorite destination of skaters during the 19th and early 20th century. The lakes were also a prime source of commercial ice for the food and restaurant industries, much of it extracted by the sector's leading company, the Société des glacières de Paris (lit. 'Paris Ice Houses Company'). As the industry moved from natural to artificial ice at the turn of the twentieth century, the company opened its main ice factory in nearby Billancourt (which later fused with Boulogne-sur-Seine to form Boulogne-Billancourt).

According to figure skating coach Jacqueline Vaudecrane, she was instrumental in securing the new building in a meeting with France's then ministry of sport, using leverage gained from the victory of her student Jacqueline du Bief's in the 1952 World Figure Skating Championships. However, the municipal archives of Boulogne-Billancourt state that preliminary work had in fact started several years before, at the behest of Jacques Lacarrière, general secretary in charge of ice hockey at the French Ice Sports Federation (which administered the sport before it became independent) and federation president Georges Guérard, as downtown Paris' Palais des sports de Grenelle was showing serious signs of aging. The rink's actual backer was grocery store heir Philippe Potin, who help procure much of the budget via a FF10 million bridge loan.

The construction site, which represented the majority of a public park, was selected due to its proximity with the Société des glacières de Paris building, which would act as the rink's ice supplier. The company was approached in 1948 and greeted the idea with enthusiasm, as it would provide a valuable source of income outside of the busy summer season. The city of Boulogne-Billancourt gave its approval in 1951 and made the terrain available for a nominal rental fee of FF100 a year. The building was erected between 1953 and 1955, and formally inaugurated on 21 December 1955. A stand was already planned at the time, but its construction only took place in 1957. Because the rink originally housed the headquarters of the French Ice Sports Federation, it came to be known at the time as Patinoire fédérale (lit. 'Federal Ice Rink') or just "La Fédérale".

In 1987, the building was added to France's General Inventory of Cultural Heritage. Following Jacques Lacarrière's death in 2005, there have been periodic efforts to rename the rink after him. Mayor Jean-Pierre Fourcade expressed his support, but after he left office the project was never seriously considered again. On 17 December 2019, a plaque was unveiled to commemorate ACBB's three wins in the famed Spengler Cup invitational tournament at the turn of the sixties.

==== Closure and conversion to padel ====
In May 2024, shortly before the conclusion of the rink's public utility delegation contract, mayor Pierre-Christophe Baguet announced that the city would not seek a new one, as the outdated facility had become too costly to operate, in part because neighboring communities contributed a large share of its user base, but none of its operating budget. He suggested that winter sports federations fund the full renovation costs and run the venue themselves. A brief extension to the delegation—capped by law to six months—was signed, ostensibly to allow willing parties to put together a takeover plan. A public interest group did propose a moratorium that would have seen two patrons contribute $300,000 to cover the most urgent refurbishments, which the city turned down as it considered private contributions to represent a legal liability.

Disputing a city-backed evaluation of the venue and claiming that it had acted in bad faith, the group set up a petition that drew more than 36,000 signatures and support from sports personalities like Teddy Riner and Stéphane Diagana. Despite the earlier announcement of a six-month grace period, the rink did not reopen on 1 October 2024. A motion to compel the city to restart operations was rejected by an administrative court in November 2024. The building was converted into Boulogne-Billancourt's first padel center. The seven-court facility managed by private operator 4Padel opened on 15 September 2025. The rink's closure was a topic of debate in the next legislative election, with Philippe Tellini, Baguet's former deputy mayor turned dissident candidate, criticizing it.

=== Design and building ===
The rink was designed by Paris-based architect Louis Saint-Calbre, a specialist of winter sports infrastructures and a competitor himself. He was assisted by engineer Georges Guyonnaud. It was built by Anciens établissements Eiffel (lit. 'Former Eiffel Establishments'), the successor company to Gustave Eiffel's original firm G. Eiffel & Cie. The gig was part of the company's efforts to reposition itself as a general contractor in the industrial and recreational markets, as metal—its speciality—was taking a backseat to concrete in large infrastructure projects. The building has two levels and one underground floor. The north and south sides were covered with aluminium.

Its most distinctive feature was perhaps its translucent roof, slanted at 12 percent and positioned 18.6 m (61 ft) above ground. It consisted of 12 m (39 ft) × 2.3 m (7.5 ft) panels made of a corrugated and laminated polyester called Tegulite, which extended onto most of the building's west side. The bottom three meters of the west wall was made of fully transparent glass to illuminate the playing area. The roof is supported by six hollow steel arches, which are 49.5 m (162 ft) to 51 m (167 ft)-wide depending on measurements. They were forged by Longométal. The building's complete metal framework weighs 210 tons. On the west side, the arches are planted in the foundations. On the east side, they are planted 9.5 m (31 ft) above ground, in a reinforced concrete structure that houses the rink's technical and administrative dependencies. These originally included a dormitory and the headquarters of the French Ice Sports Federation, which were located on the first floor.

The concrete structure also provides full support for the building's two-level stand, which is not directly attached to its steel structure. It was originally conceived for 2,800 spectators. The main hall is 63 m (207 ft) × 50 m (160 ft). Although it has sometimes been called a Patinoire olympique, in reference to its Olympic-size dimensions of 60 × 30 metre 1,800 m^{2} (19,000 sq ft), one source mentions that its ice sheet fell slightly short of traditional Olympic requirements, with listed dimensions of approximately 60 m (200 ft) × 29 m (95 ft), and a listed surface of 1,711 m^{2} (18,420 sq ft). The main hall was originally adorned with a monumental analog scoreboard on the west side (which has since been replaced), and a large analog clock on north wall (which remains), both made by Longines.

The rink was originally connected to the Société des glacières de Paris via a tunnel under rue Émile-Pouget, which carried brine ice at a temperature of −17 °C (1 °F) from the factory to the venue. As cold rooms had by then supplanted much of the business, the ice factory closed in 1974 and the rink transitioned to a standalone refrigeration system. The public park that today borders the rink, and occupies the land where the ice factory once stood, bears the name Parc des glacières (lit. 'Ice Houses Park') in remembrance of the area's historical background.

In 2002–2003, in conjunction with a remodel of the adjacent swimming pool, the rink was given a major makeover. The original translucent roof was replaced by a better insulated one made of metal, while the translucent panels on the west side were replaced by a full glass wall. The office space was also restructured, although the general shape of the building was kept intact due to its architectural value.

=== Resident organizations ===
The rink hosted the headquarters of the French Ice Sports Federation (FFSG) for fourteen years, between 1955 and 1969. It was also home to the Ligue des Sports de Glace Île-de-France (a division of the FFSG overseeing the Paris Region specifically) from the division's creation in 1969 to 2004. Two rooms on the first floor have been repurposed as dance studios for various local schools.

The Federation's national figure skating school founded by trainer Jacqueline Vaudecrane moved to Boulogne-Billancourt from Sporting Victor-Hugo, and hosted such athletes as Alain Calmat, Alain Giletti, Patrick Péra and Surya Bonaly, most of them registered with the ice sports section of Athletic Club de Boulogne-Billancourt. In 1998, the rink welcomed the ice skating section of another multisports group, Paris Olympique Club, which was created that year, largely to accommodate figure skater Laëtitia Hubert after she and her coach had a falling out with Français Volants, Paris' historic ice sports club based at Patinoire Sonja-Henie.

The first speed skating event hosted by the rink was a standalone event celebrating its inauguration, on 29 December 1955. The venue once housed a speed skating club chaired by André Kouprianoff. Speed skating activities were organized under the names C.P.C.P. (Club de Patinage de Course de Paris) and C.E.P.G.

Prior to the wave of ice rink openings that accompanied 1968's Grenoble Olympics, Boulogne hosted most hockey teams in the Paris Region. The first hockey game played at the venue pitted Paris HC against CSG Paris (later known as CSG Molitor). Other featured teams included hometown side ACBB, US Métro (which moved to Viry-Châtillon in 1971 as Jets de Viry), Association sportive de la Préfecture de police de Paris and the short-lived Lions de Paris. Even though he was one of the driving forces behind the venue, Jacques Lacarrière frowned upon having to share ice time with so many tenants, and opted against bringing back his own club, Français Volants (which was then on hold). The Volants would only reform in 1965 with the opening of Palais de la jeunesse et des sports in Charenton-le-Pont.
Boulogne also hosted a brief revival of the Coupe Jean-Potin, an invitational hockey tournament created by Philippe Potin's father Jean Potin, which had enjoyed popular success before and immediately after World War II at the Palais des sports de Grenelle.

=== In popular culture ===
On 2 January 1972, the rink hosted a special edition of :fr:Télé-Dimanche (lit. 'Sunday TV'), French television's leading weekend variety show, whose set was built atop the ice. On this occasion, the program was exceptionally renamed Télé-Dimanche sur glace (lit. 'Sunday TV on Ice'). Several popular singers of the day performed their current hits on ice skates, including Claude François ("Il fait beau, il fait bon") and Sylvie Vartan ("Non je ne suis plus la même"), although most appeared to lip sync.

Between the 1970s to 1990s, the rink also hosted concerts. Including standing room, the building had a capacity of about 6,000 as a live entertainment venue. In addition to several standalone acts, the venue hosted 1990's TBB Blues, an event spun off from the TBB Jazz festival held at the nearby Théâtre de Boulogne-Billancourt, which featured Walter Washington, Etta James, The Blues Brothers, Albert King and Curtis Mayfield. For some of these events, it was rebranded as Palais d'hiver ('Winter Palace').

On 25 April 1974, the ice rink hosted a major rally for presidential candidate Jacques Chaban-Delmas, in presence of fellow politicians like André Malraux and Michel Debré, as well as celebrities such as TV host Guy Lux. This happened to be the first political rally attended by future president Nicolas Sarkozy, and inspired him to pursue a political career.

=== Notable sports events ===
- French Figure Skating Championships (1956–1967, 1969, 1970, 1974)
- French Ice Dancing Championships (1971)
- Boston Bruins–New York Rangers European tour, Games 5 and 6 (1959)
- Coupe Jean-Potin (1960)
- Ice hockey Coupe de France Final (2000)

=== Featured entertainers (selected list) ===
- The Blues Brothers
- Def Leppard
- Devo
- Curtis Mayfield
- Ted Nugent
- Rainbow
- Lou Reed
- Trust
- Stevie Wonder

== Swimming pool ==
Piscine de Boulogne-Billancourt
- Former names: Piscine du Stade Français
- Location: 165 rue du Vieux-Pont-de-Sèvres
- Facilities: Fitness center Spa
- Dimensions: Length: 25 metre (pool 1) 25 metre (pool 2); Width: 20 metre (pool 1) 12,5 metre (pool 2)

Construction
- Opened: 1 November 1962
- Architects: Henri-Pierre Maillard; Paul Ducamp

=== History ===
The swimming pool is located immediately to the west of the ice rink. It was built between 1961 and 1962, and inaugurated on 1 November 1962. It was originally the property of multisports club Stade Français, although the organization faced financial problems at the end of the 1960s and there were talks of closing it. Stade Français eventually sold the venue, which became city-owned, and relocated to the new Centre Charras in Courbevoie in 1973.

In the 1980s, the pool hosted the Meeting International de Natation de la F.F.N., successively title-sponsored by swimwear brands Arena and Diana Sport, which was described as the world's most important short course meet at the time. In 2014, former Olympic champion swimmer Laure Manaudou hosted the debut fashion show of her swimwear brand LM Design at the venue.

=== Design ===
Beginning in 1957, the base concrete design was laid out by architects fr:Henri-Pierre Maillard and Paul Ducamp of Atelier d’architecture MD, who cornered a large segment of the market during France's post World War II swimming pool boom. In 1960, engineer fr:Stéphane Du Chateau joined the project and added his proprietary Système SDC, a metal arch system previously used at the Grandval Dam. The resulting design was considered an evolutionary step towards the popular Tournesol model that would become ubiquitous in the ensuing years. In its original configuration, the building housed an eight-lane, 33-metre pool on its main floor, inside a square-shaped 40 × 40 metre hall. A mobile wall separated a typically 25-metre long competition area from a smaller teaching area. A small slide was also on offer. A lower level featuring a sauna and a multisports room, from which portholes originally allowed a view of the adjacent underwater area.

The facility received a major restructuring between 2001 and 2003, estimated at €16 million, under architect Thierry Nabères of Paris-based firm TNA Architectes, in conjunction with a refurbishment of the neighboring ice rink. On this occasion, the original pool was shortened from 33 to 25 metre. The remaining area was fitted with a separate play pool, part of which extends outside. A new building was also built from scratch: the street level offers a second 25-metre, five-lane pool and children's areas, while a new 50-metre slide replaces the original. The operation took the overall water surface from 660 m^{2} (7,100 sq ft) to 1,260 m^{2} (13,600 sq ft). The upper floor is dedicated to a spa and a fitness center.

=== Notable events ===
- Meeting International de Natation de la F.F.N. (19??–????)
