= 1964–65 1re série season =

French professional ice hockey season

The 1964–65 1re série season was the 44th season of the 1re série, the top level of ice hockey in France. Five teams participated in the final round, and Chamonix Hockey Club won their 21st league title.

== Final round ==
	Club	GP	W	T	L	GF	GA	Pts
1.	Chamonix Hockey Club	8	8	0	0	122	15	16
2.	Athletic Club de Boulogne-Billancourt	8	5	1	2	72	42	11
3.	Ours de Villard-de-Lans	8	2	3	3	33	52	7
4.	Gap Hockey Club	8	1	2	5	23	71	4
5.	Français Volants	8	1	0	7	28	98	2
