= 1981–82 Nationale A season =

French professional ice hockey season

The 1981–82 Nationale A season was the 61st season of the Nationale A, the top level of ice hockey in France. 10 teams participated in the league, and CSG Grenoble won their second league title. Hockey Club de Caen was relegated to the Nationale B.

== First round ==
	Club	GP	W	T	L	GF	GA	Pts
1.	CSG Grenoble	18	14	1	3	122	47	29
2.	Chamonix Hockey Club	18	14	0	4	126	73	28
3.	ASG Tours	18	13	1	4	151	62	27
4.	Ours de Villard-de-Lans	18	12	1	5	90	72	25
5.	Gap Hockey Club	18	8	3	7	70	96	19
6.	Sporting Hockey Club Saint Gervais	18	7	1	10	111	123	15
7.	Viry-Châtillon Essonne Hockey	18	6	2	10	74	79	14
8.	Club des Sports de Megève	18	6	2	10	79	94	14
9.	Club des patineurs lyonnais	18	2	2	14	79	156	6
10.	Hockey Club de Caen	18	2	0	16	37	136	4

== Final round ==
	Club	GP	W	T	L	GF	GA	Pts
1.	CSG Grenoble	32	24	2	6	212	100	50
2.	ASG Tours	32	23	3	6	244	127	49
3.	Ours de Villard-de-Lans	32	19	3	10	150	126	41
4.	Chamonix Hockey Club	32	17	3	12	176	135	37
5.	Gap Hockey Club	32	13	4	15	146	172	30
6.	Sporting Hockey Club Saint Gervais	32	12	5	15	188	199	29
7.	Club des Sports de Megève	32	12	2	18	147	170	26
8.	Viry-Châtillon Essonne Hockey	32	8	4	20	131	188	20

== Relegation ==
	Club	GP	W	T	L	GF	GA	Pts
1.	HC Amiens Somme	10	6	2	2	51	38	14
2.	Diables Rouges de Briançon	10	7	0	3	55	33	14
3.	Image Club d’Épinal	10	6	0	4	43	30	12
4.	Club des patineurs lyonnais	10	4	2	4	46	40	10
5.	Hockey Club de Caen	10	4	0	6	34	47	8
6.	Valenciennes Hainaut Hockey Club	10	1	0	9	37	78	2
