= 1936–37 1re série season =

French professional ice hockey season

The 1936–37 1re série season was the 21st season of the 1re série, the top level of ice hockey in France. The final was not contested and no champion was declared.

== Paris Championship ==
	Club	GP	W	T	L	GF	GA	Pts
1.	Français Volants	3	3	0	0	13	1	6
2.	Rapides de Paris	3	2	0	1	9	6	4
3.	Diables de France	3	0	1	2	6	8	1
4.	CSH Paris	3	0	1	2	2	15	1

== Final ==
- Français Volants - Chamonix Hockey Club (not played)
