= 1951–52 1re série season =

French professional ice hockey season

The 1951–52 1re série season was the 31st season of the 1re série, the top level of ice hockey in France. Seven teams participated in the league, and Chamonix Hockey Club won their 13th league title. Due to the final round being cancelled because of heavy snowfall, it was decided that a game between Chamonix Hockey Club (representing the Alpes Group) and CO Billancourt (representing the Paris Group) would be played for the championship.

== First round ==
=== Paris Group ===
| | Club | Pts |
|---|---|---|
| 1. | Paris Université Club | 6 |
| 2. | CO Billancourt | 4 |
| 3. | CSG Paris | 2 |
| 4. | Radio TS | 0 |

=== Alpes Group ===
| | Club | Pts |
|---|---|---|
| 1. | Chamonix Hockey Club | 4 |
| 2. | Diables Rouges de Briançon | 2 |
| 3. | Ours de Villard-de-Lans | 0 |

== Final ==
- CA Billancourt - Chamonix Hockey Club 3:6
