= 1960–61 1re série season =

French professional ice hockey season

The 1960–61 1re série season was the 40th season of the 1re série, the top level of ice hockey in France. Chamonix Hockey Club won their 18th league title.

== First round ==
=== Paris Group ===
Athletic Club de Boulogne-Billancourt qualified for the final.

=== Alpes Group ===
	Club	GP	W	T	L	GF	GA	Pts
1.	Chamonix Hockey Club	4	4	0	0	39	9	8
2.	Ours de Villard-de-Lans	4	2	0	2	25	19	4
3.	Diables Rouges de Briançon	4	0	0	4	8	44	0

== Final ==
- Chamonix Hockey Club - Athletic Club de Boulogne-Billancourt 6:3/3:1
