= 1961–62 1re série season =

French professional ice hockey season

The 1961–62 1re série season was the 41st season of the 1re série, the top level of ice hockey in France. Athletic Club de Boulogne-Billancourt won their 3rd league title. Chamonix Hockey Club automatically qualified for the final as last year's champion. The game between them and the regular season champion, Athletic Club de Boulogne-Billancourt, did not take place, and Boulogne-Billancourt was declared champions.

== Regular season ==
	Club	GP	W	T	L	GF	GA	Pts
1.	Athletic Club de Boulogne-Billancourt	3	3	0	0	39	10	6
2.	Ours de Villard-de-Lans	3	2	0	1	24	19	4
3.	Diables Rouges de Briançon	4	0	0	4	13	47	0

== Final ==
- Athletic Club de Boulogne-Billancourt - Chamonix Hockey Club (Not played)
