= Denis Dupéré =

Canadian ice hockey player (1948–2019)

- Born: June 21, 1948 Jonquière, Quebec, Canada
- Died: April 14, 2019 (aged 70) Jonquière, Quebec, Canada
- Height: 6 ft 0 in (183 cm)
- Weight: 175 lb (79 kg; 12 st 7 lb)
- Position: Left wing
- Shot: Left
- Played for: Toronto Maple Leafs; Washington Capitals; St. Louis Blues; Kansas City Scouts; Colorado Rockies
- National team: Canada
- Playing career: 1969–1978

Denis Gilles Dupéré (June 21, 1948 – April 14, 2019) was a Canadian professional ice hockey left winger. He played for the Toronto Maple Leafs, Washington Capitals, St. Louis Blues, Kansas City Scouts, and Colorado Rockies of the National Hockey League between 1970 and 1978.

== Biography ==
Dupéré was born in Jonquière, Quebec.

Acquired by the Toronto Maple Leafs from the New York Rangers, Dupéré played four seasons with the Maple Leafs. After being left exposed for the 1974 NHL Expansion Draft, he was claimed by the Washington Capitals. He scored two goals against the Chicago Blackhawks in the Capitals' first win in franchise history. After being named the Capitals' first representative to the NHL All-Star game, he was traded to the St. Louis Blues. The Blues traded him to the Kansas City Scouts the following season, and he would remain with the organization, including after its move to Colorado, until his retirement in 1978. He died from cancer in 2019.

== Career statistics ==
=== Regular season and playoffs ===
			Regular season					Playoffs
Season	Team	League	GP	G	A	Pts	PIM	GP	G	A	Pts	PIM
1964–65	Jonquière Marquis	QJHL	—	—	—	—	—	—	—	—	—	—
1965–66	Jonquière Marquis	QJHL	—	—	—	—	—	—	—	—	—	—
1965–66	Jonquière Marquis	Mem-Cup	—	—	—	—	—	3	1	1	2	0
1966–67	Kitchener Greenshirts	CJHL	—	—	—	—	—	—	—	—	—	—
1966–67	Kitchener Rangers	OHA-Jr.	4	1	1	2	0	—	—	—	—	—
1967–68	Kitchener Rangers	OHA-Jr.	54	35	24	59	22	19	2	7	9	20
1968–69	Ottawa Nationals	OHA-Sr.	5	4	4	8	7	—	—	—	—	—
1968–69	Canadian National Team	Intl	—	—	—	—	—	—	—	—	—	—
1969–70	Omaha Knights	CHL	72	33	19	52	35	12	5	7	12	11
1970–71	Toronto Maple Leafs	NHL	20	1	2	3	4	6	0	0	0	0
1970–71	Tulsa Oilers	CHL	48	20	34	54	40	—	—	—	—	—
1971–72	Toronto Maple Leafs	NHL	77	7	10	17	4	5	0	0	0	0
1972–73	Toronto Maple Leafs	NHL	61	13	23	36	10	—	—	—	—	—
1973–74	Toronto Maple Leafs	NHL	34	8	9	17	8	3	0	0	0	0
1974–75	Washington Capitals	NHL	53	20	15	35	8	—	—	—	—	—
1974–75	St. Louis Blues	NHL	22	3	6	9	8	—	—	—	—	—
1975–76	Kansas City Scouts	NHL	43	6	8	14	16	—	—	—	—	—
1976–77	Colorado Rockies	NHL	57	7	11	18	4	—	—	—	—	—
1976–77	Rhode Island Reds	AHL	4	3	3	6	0	—	—	—	—	—
1977–78	Colorado Rockies	NHL	54	15	15	30	4	2	1	0	1	0
1977–78	Hampton Gulls	AHL	1	2	0	2	0	—	—	—	—	—
1977–78	Philadelphia Firebirds	AHL	12	3	2	5	10	—	—	—	—	—
1979–80	Nelson Maple Leafs	WIHL	10	2	5	7	—	—	—	—	—	—
1980–81	Club des Patineurs Lyonnais	FRA	18	16	11	27	—	—	—	—	—	—
NHL totals			421	80	99	179	66	16	1	0	1	0
