= 1953–54 1re série season =

French ice hockey sports season

The 1953–54 1re série season was the 33rd season of the 1re série, the top level of ice hockey in France. Chamonix Hockey Club won their 14th league title.

== Final ranking ==
- 1st place: Chamonix Hockey Club
- 2nd place: Paris Université Club
- 3rd place: CSG Paris
- 4th place: Diables Rouges de Briançon
- 5th place: Ours de Villard-de-Lans
- 6th place: Radio Tout Sport
