= Aces Cup =

The Aces Cup (French: Coupe des As) was an ice hockey tournament in France. It was made up mostly of teams from the Ligue Magnus, but in 1986 the top four teams from Nationale 2 also participated. The cup was held three times from 1985 to 1992, in 1985, 1986, and 1992.

== Champions ==
Year	City	Winner	Runner-up	Score
1992	Briançon	Diables Rouges de Briançon	Dragons de Rouen	6-2
1986	Lyon	Rapaces de Gap	Français Volants de Paris	10-3
1985	Lyon	Saint-Gervais	Chamonix	10-3
