= 1956–57 1re série season =

Ice hockey season

The 1956–57 1re série season was the 36th season of the 1re série, the top level of ice hockey in France. Three teams participated in the final tournament, and Athletic Club de Boulogne-Billancourt won their first championship.

== Final tournament ==
| | Club | GP | W | T | L | GF | GA | Pts |
|---|---|---|---|---|---|---|---|---|
| 1. | Athletic Club de Boulogne-Billancourt | 2 | 2 | 0 | 0 | 13 | 2 | 4 |
| 2. | Club des patineurs lyonnais | 2 | 1 | 0 | 1 | 6 | 8 | 2 |
| 3. | Chamonix Hockey Club | 2 | 0 | 0 | 2 | 3 | 12 | 0 |
