= 1940–41 1re série season =

French ice hockey tournament

The 1940–41 1re série season was the 24th season of the 1re série, the top level of ice hockey in France. The championship was not completed, and no champion was declared.

== Participating teams ==
- Briançon
- Chamonix Hockey Club
- Français Volants
- Gap
- Paris Université Club
- Racing club de France
- Villard-de-Lans

== Results ==
=== Semifinals ===
- Briançon 2-0 Chamonix Hockey Club
- Paris Université Club beat ?

=== Final ===
The final between Briançon and Paris Université Club was not held due to World War II.
