= 1924–25 French Ice Hockey Championship =

The 1924–25 French Ice Hockey Championship was the tenth edition of the French Ice Hockey Championship, the national ice hockey championship in France. Chamonix Hockey Club won their second championship.

== Final ==
- Chamonix Hockey Club - Club des Sports d’Hiver de Paris 4:0 (0:0, 4:0)
