= 1934–35 1re série season =

French professional ice hockey season

The 1934–35 1re série season was the 19th season of the 1re série, the top level of ice hockey in France. Stade Français won their third championship.

== Tournament ==
=== Semifinals ===
- Stade Français - Chamonix Hockey Club 9:2 (0:0, 6:0, 3:2)

=== Final ===
- Stade Français - Français Volants 4:3 OT (1:0, 2:2, 0:1, 1:0)
