= 1919–20 French Ice Hockey Championship =

The 1919–20 French Ice Hockey Championship was the sixth edition of the French Ice Hockey Championship, the national ice hockey championship in France. Ice Skating Club de Paris won their first championship.

== Final ==
- Chamonix Hockey Club - Ice Skating Club de Paris 2:3
