= 1928–29 French Ice Hockey Championship =

The 1928–29 French Ice Hockey Championship was the 13th edition of the French Ice Hockey Championship, the national ice hockey championship in France. Chamonix Hockey Club won the championship for the fifth time.

== Final ==
- Chamonix Hockey Club - Club des Sports d’Hiver de Paris 1:0 OT
