= 1931–32 1re série season =

French professional ice hockey season

The 1931–32 1re série season was the 16th season of the 1re série, the top level of ice hockey in France. Stade Français won their first championship.

== Tournament ==
=== Semifinals ===
- Stade Français - Club des Sports d’Hiver de Paris 14:1
- Racing Club de France - Chamonix Hockey Club (Forfeit)

=== Final ===
- Stade Français - Racing Club de France 3:2 OT (0:0, 1:1, 1:1, 1:0)
