= 1937–38 1re série season =

French professional ice hockey season

The 1937–38 1re série season was the 22nd season of the 1re série, the top level of ice hockey in France. Français Volants won their second championship.

== Final ranking ==
- 1st place: Français Volants
- 2nd place: Chamonix Hockey Club
- 3rd place: Diables de France
