= 1938–39 1re série season =

French professional ice hockey season

The 1938–39 1re série season was the 23rd season of the 1re série, the top level of ice hockey in France. Chamonix Hockey Club won their eighth championship.

== Final ranking ==
- 1st place: Chamonix Hockey Club
- 2nd place: Français Volants
