= Coupe de France (ice hockey) =

French ice hockey championship

- Sport: Ice hockey
- Founded: 1972
- Country: France
- Most recent champion: Brûleurs de Loups de Grenoble
- Broadcaster: Sport en France (Final)
- Streaming partner: Fanseat
- Website: www.hockeyfrance.com

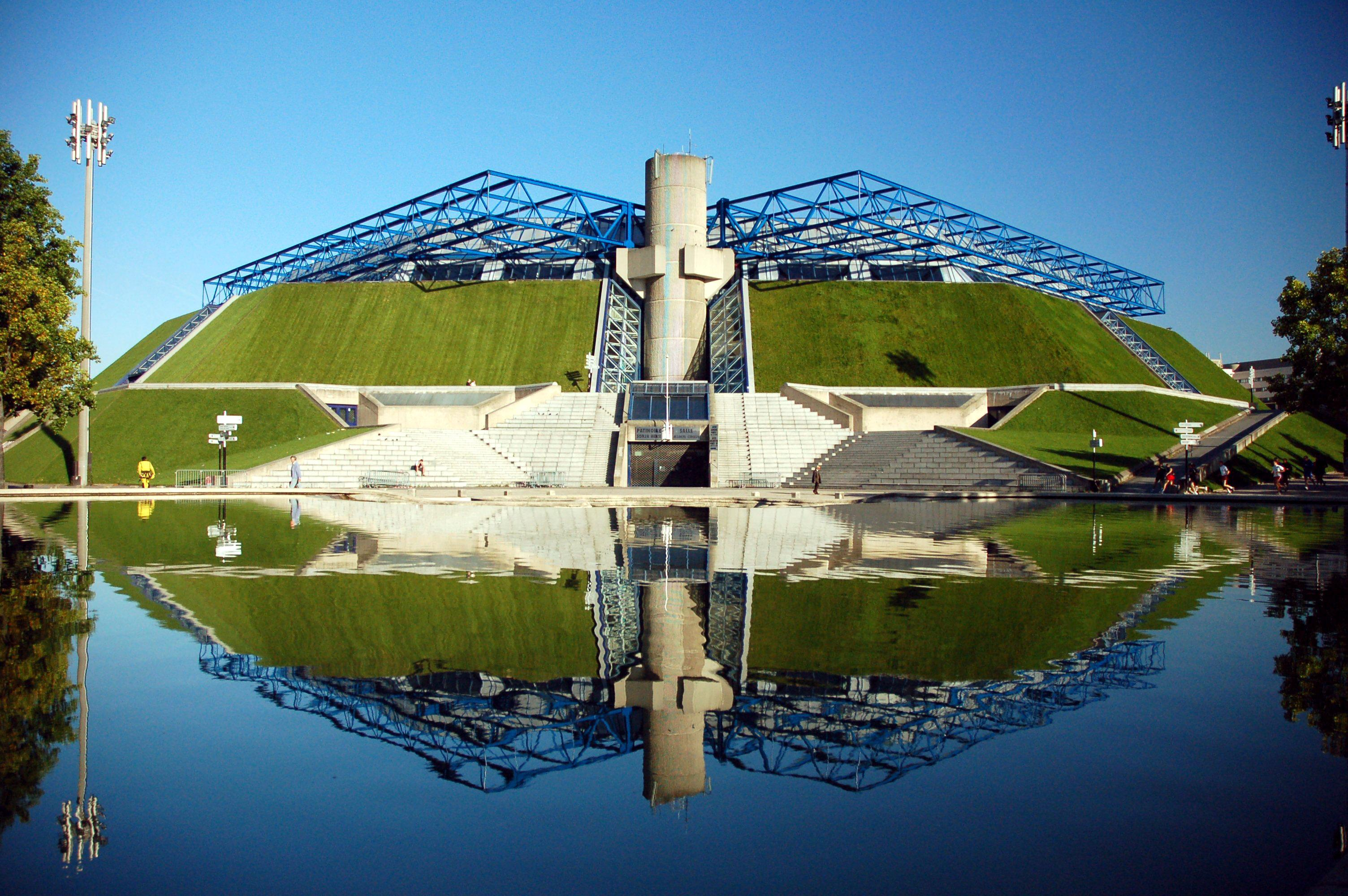
Palais ominisport de Paris-Bercy

The Coupe de France (lit. 'French Cup') an ice hockey competition in France. It is the premier knockout cup organized by the French Ice Hockey Federation.

== Formula ==
Participation is mandatory for the three highest tiers of the French men's hockey pyramid, and voluntary for members of the fourth tier, which may require the staging of a preliminary round for select teams in some years. Teams from the country's top tier, the Ligue Magnus, enter in the second round. When teams from different tiers are drawn against one another, the lower-tier team will automatically be designated as the host side (except for the final, which is played at a predetermined venue). For the first two rounds, which predominantly involve semi-professional and amateur organizations, teams are drawn from regional groups. Thereafter, draws are entirely random.

== Final venue ==
In early decades, the competition's format changed frequently and the final was not held at a regular venue. In 2005, Méribel Olympic Ice Rink, known for hosting the hockey tournament during the 1992 Winter Olympics, was appointed as the host venue. Following two seasons there, Federation president Luc Tardif decided to move the event to Palais ominisport de Paris-Bercy (today Accor Arena), while Méribel became host to the final of a newly created secondary cup, the Coupe de la Ligue ('League Cup'). The choice of the capital's largest and most famous indoor arena turned out to be an unexpected success, providing the French game with a marquee event and significantly increasing the Coupe de France's prestige.

== Trophy ==
For the 2001–02 edition, when it was decided to make the event a regular fixture, a permanent trophy was inaugurated. Of classic shape, it was made of blue porcelain with golden accents. In the 2006 off-season, it took the name of influential Canadian-born player and coach Gaëtan "Pete" Laliberté, who had recently died. In 2022, the original trophy, which had proven very susceptible to damage, was replaced by a new one made of metal, and chosen from three possible designs via a fan vote.

== Previous winners ==
Season	Date	Venue	Attendance	Winner	Runner-up	Score
2023–24	21 January 2024	Accor Arena – Paris	13,877	Brûleurs de Loups de Grenoble	Corsaires de Dunkerque	7–4
2022–23	29 January 2023	Accor Arena – Paris	13,877	Brûleurs de Loups de Grenoble	Rapaces de Gap	3–2
2021–22	30 January 2022	Aren'Ice – Cergy	2,000 (Note: Final moved to Aren'Ice after attendance was capped to 2000 due to COVID-19 restrictions.)	Ducs d'Angers	Rapaces de Gap	5–4 (OT)
2020–21	Competition abandoned during round of 32 due to COVID-19					
2019–20	16 February 2020	AccorHotels Arena – Paris	13,877	Gothiques d'Amiens	Dragons de Rouen	3–2 (SO)
2018–19	17 February 2019	AccorHotels Arena – Paris	9,769	Gothiques d'Amiens	Lions de Lyon	3–2 (OT)
2017–18	28 January 2018	AccorHotels Arena – Paris	11,557	Lions de Lyon	Rapaces de Gap	2–0
2016–17	19 February 2017	AccorHotels Arena – Paris	11,367	Brûleurs de Loups de Grenoble	Dragons de Rouen	3–2 (OT)
2015–16	3 January 2016	AccorHotels Arena – Paris	10,020	Dragons de Rouen	Brûleurs de Loups de Grenoble	4–2
2014–15	25 January 2015	Palais omnisports Marseille Grand-Est – Marseille (Note: Final moved to Marseille due to renovations at Palais omnisport de Paris-Bercy.)	3,517	Dragons de Rouen	Gothiques d'Amiens	5–3
2013–14	26 January 2014	Palais omnisports de Paris-Bercy – Paris	13,357	Ducs d'Angers	Dragons de Rouen	4–0
2012–13	17 February 2013	Palais omnisports de Paris-Bercy – Paris	13,354	Diables Rouges de Briançon	Ducs d'Angers	2–1
2011–12	29 January 2012	Palais omnisports de Paris-Bercy – Paris	13,362	Ducs de Dijon	Dragons de Rouen	7–6 (OT)
2010–11	30 January 2011	Palais omnisports de Paris-Bercy – Paris	13,364	Dragons de Rouen	Ducs d'Angers	5–4 (SO)
2009–10	31 January 2010	Palais omnisports de Paris-Bercy – Paris	13,359	Diables Rouges de Briançon	Dragons de Rouen	2–1 (SO)
2008–09	22 February 2009	Palais omnisports de Paris-Bercy – Paris	12,500	Brûleurs de Loups de Grenoble	Ducs de Dijon	6–1
2007–08	17 February 2008	Palais omnisports de Paris-Bercy – Paris	12,904	Brûleurs de Loups de Grenoble	Dragons de Rouen	3–2 (SO)
2006–07	14 February 2007	Palais omnisports de Paris-Bercy – Paris	12,215	Ducs d'Angers	Dauphins d'Épinal	4–1
2005–06	28 February 2006	Olympic Park – Méribel	2,500	Ducs de Dijon	Diables Rouges de Briançon	3–2 (OT)
2004–05	25 February 2005	Olympic Park – Méribel	2,225	Dragons de Rouen	Diables Rouges de Briançon	4–3
2003–04	9 March 2004	Pôle Sud – Grenoble	3,500	Dragons de Rouen	Brûleurs de Loups de Grenoble	5–1
2002–03	18 March 2003	Patinoire des Fins – Annecy	1,600	Ours de Villard-de-Lans	Orques d'Anglet	3–2 (SO)
2001–02	19 February 2002	Patinoire Lafayette – Besançon		Dragons de Rouen	Séquanes de Besançon	8–1
1999–2000	14 March 2000	Patinoire de Boulogne-Billancourt	2,200	Léopards de Caen	Dragons de Rouen	4–1
1993–94	30 April 1994	Patinoire Clémenceau – Grenoble		Brûleurs de Loups de Grenoble	Huskies de Chamonix	5–4 (OT)
1986–87	28 April 1987	Centre municipal des sports – Tours		Français volants	Mammouths de Tours	8–5
1985–86	Replaced by Coupe des As					
1984–85	Replaced by Coupe des As					
1983–84	31 March 1984			Orléans	Clermont-Ferrand	6–2
1981–82				Clermont-Ferrand	Angers	3–2
1980–81		Patinoire municipale – Saint-Gervais-les-Bains; Centre municipal des sports – Tours		Saint-Gervais	Mammouths de Tours	8–4;8–5
1979–80	5 April 1980	Patinoire olympique Charlemagne – Lyon		Pralognan	Meudon	9–7
1978–79	31 March 1979	Patinoire municipale – Dijon		Nice	Dunkerque	5–4
1977–78	29 April 1978	Centre sportif municipal Île Marante – Colombes		Mammouths de Tours	CPM Croix	6–4 (OT)
1976–77	23 April 1977			Ours de Villard-de-Lans	Mammouths de Tours	5–4
1975–76	24 April 1976	Patinoire municipale – Dijon		Saint-Gervais	HC Caen	12–6
1974–75	19 April 1975	Centre municipal des sports – Tours		Mammouths de Tours	CPM Croix	4–3
1973–74	27 April 1974	Centre sportif du docteur Duchêne – Rouen		Chamonix	Saint-Gervais	10–5
1972–73	28 April 1973	Parc des expositions – Châlons-sur-Marne	1,000	Chamonix	Villard-de-Lans	6–4
1971–72	15 April 1972	Patinoire olympique Charlemagne – Lyon		Chamonix	Villard-de-Lans	8–2

Competition held during international breaks. Teams mostly played without their internationals.
First and second-tier teams did not participate.
