= 1945–46 1re série season =

French professional ice hockey season

The 1945–46 1re série season was the 27th season of the 1re série, the top level of ice hockey in France. Three teams participated in the league, and Chamonix Hockey Club won their eleventh championship.

== Regular season ==
	Club	GP	W	T	L	GF	GA	Pts
1.	Chamonix Hockey Club	2	2	0	0	10	2	4
2.	Français Volants	2	1	0	1	5	3	2
3.	CSG Paris	2	0	0	2	2	12	0
