= 1935–36 1re série season =

French professional ice hockey season

The 1935–36 1re série season was the 20th season of the 1re série, the top level of ice hockey in France. Français Volants won their first championship.

== Tournament ==
=== Semifinal ===
- Stade Français - Chamonix Hockey Club 4:2 OT

=== Final ===
- Français Volants - Stade Français 3:2/7:5
