= 1922–23 French Ice Hockey Championship =

The 1922–23 French Ice Hockey Championship was the ninth edition of the French Ice Hockey Championship, the national ice hockey championship in France. Chamonix Hockey Club won their first championship.

== Final ==
- Chamonix Hockey Club - Club des Sports d’Hiver de Paris 2:0 (2:0, 0:0)
