= 1912–13 French Ice Hockey Championship =

The 1912–13 French Ice Hockey Championship was the fourth edition of the French Ice Hockey Championship, the national ice hockey championship in France. Club des Patineurs de Paris won their third championship.

== Final ==
- Chamonix Hockey Club - Club des Patineurs de Paris 1:12
