= 1930–31 1re série season =

French professional ice hockey season

The 1930–31 1re série season was the 15th season of the 1re série, the top level of ice hockey in France. Chamonix Hockey Club won their seventh league title.

== Final ==
- Chamonix Hockey Club - Club des Sports d’Hiver de Paris 4:1 (2:0, 2:1, 0:0)
