= 1982–83 Nationale A season =

French professional ice hockey season

The 1982–83 Nationale A season was the 62nd season of the Nationale A, the top level of ice hockey in France. 12 teams participated in the league, and Sporting Hockey Club Saint Gervais won their fourth league title. Club des patineurs lyonnais was relegated to the Nationale B.

== First round ==
	Club	GP	W	T	L	GF	GA	Pts
1.	Sporting Hockey Club Saint Gervais	22	17	2	3	195	106	36
2.	Chamonix Hockey Club	22	15	4	3	153	96	34
3.	Ours de Villard-de-Lans	22	14	3	5	109	74	31
4.	CSG Grenoble	22	14	2	6	130	71	30
5.	Gap Hockey Club	22	11	5	6	136	121	27
6.	ASG Tours	22	9	4	9	104	105	22
7.	Club des Sports de Megève	22	9	3	10	106	102	21
8.	Viry-Châtillon Essonne Hockey	22	9	3	10	107	111	21
9.	Image Club d’Épinal	22	7	1	14	87	148	15
10.	Diables Rouges de Briançon	22	5	3	14	87	139	13
11.	Club des patineurs lyonnais	22	3	2	17	86	150	8
12.	HC Amiens Somme	22	2	2	18	95	172	6

== Final round ==
	Club	GP	W	T	L	GF	GA	Pts
1.	Sporting Hockey Club Saint Gervais	36	28	3	5	120	73	59
2.	CSG Grenoble	36	25	3	8	88	47	53
3.	Chamonix Hockey Club	36	22	5	9	87	84	49
4.	Viry-Châtillon Essonne Hockey	36	19	3	14	105	82	41
5.	Ours de Villard-de-Lans	36	15	5	16	44	91	35
6.	Club des Sports de Megève	36	15	4	17	87	82	34
7.	Gap Hockey Club	36	14	6	16	69	115	34
8.	ASG Tours	36	11	7	18	67	93	29

== Relegation ==
	Club	GP	W	T	L	GF	GA	Pts
1.	Diables Rouges de Briançon	14	11	0	3	111	58	22
2.	Hockey Club de Caen	14	10	1	3	96	51	21
3.	HC Amiens Somme	14	10	0	4	106	63	20
4.	Image Club d’Épinal	14	9	1	4	90	61	19
5.	Club des patineurs lyonnais	14	5	0	9	54	69	10
6.	Français Volants	14	4	0	10	66	110	8
7.	Ducs de Dijon	14	3	1	10	70	125	7
8.	Anglet Hormadi Élite	14	2	1	11	43	99	5
