= 1913–14 French Ice Hockey Championship =

The 1913–14 French Ice Hockey Championship was the fifth edition of the French Ice Hockey Championship, the national ice hockey championship in France. Club des Patineurs de Paris won their fourth championship.

== Final ==
- Chamonix Hockey Club - Club des Patineurs de Paris 0:14
