= 1911–12 French Ice Hockey Championship =

The 1911–12 French Ice Hockey Championship was the third edition of the French Ice Hockey Championship, the national ice hockey championship in France. It was the first since 1908. Club des Patineurs de Paris won their second championship.

== Final ==
- Chamonix Hockey Club - Club des Patineurs de Paris 1:9 (1:4, 0:5)
