= 1941–42 1re série season =

French professional ice hockey season

The 1941–42 1re série season was the 25th season of the 1re série, the top level of ice hockey in France. Chamonix Hockey Club won their ninth championship.

== Final ==
- Chamonix Hockey Club - Français Volants 7:1
