= 1955–56 1re série season =

French professional ice hockey season

The 1955–56 1re série season was the 35th season of the 1re série, the top level of ice hockey in France. Club des patineurs lyonnais won their first and only league title.

== Final ranking ==
- 1st place: Club des patineurs lyonnais
- 2nd place: Chamonix Hockey Club
- ? place: CSG Paris
- ? place: Ours de Villard-de-Lans
