= 1933–34 1re série season =

French professional ice hockey season

The 1933–34 1re série season was the 18th season of the 1re série, the top level of ice hockey in France. The Rapides de Paris won their first and only championship.

== Tournament ==
=== Semifinals ===
- Rapides de Paris - Français Volants 2:0 (0:0, 1:0, 1:0)
- Chamonix Hockey Club - Diables de France 1:0 (0:0, 0:0, 1:0)

=== 3rd place game ===
- Français Volants - Diables de France 2:1 (1:0, 1:1)

=== Final ===
- Rapides de Paris - Chamonix Hockey Club 7:0 (4:0, 1:0, 2:0)
