= 1926–27 French Ice Hockey Championship =

The 1926–27 French Ice Hockey Championship was the 12th edition of the French Ice Hockey Championship, the national ice hockey championship in France. Chamonix Hockey Club won the championship for the fourth time.

== Final ==
- Chamonix Hockey Club - Club des Sports d’Hiver de Paris 2:0 (0:0, 2:0)
