= 1920–21 French Ice Hockey Championship =

The 1920–21 French Ice Hockey Championship was the seventh edition of the French Ice Hockey Championship, the national ice hockey championship in France. Ice Skating Club de Paris won their second championship.

== Final ==
- Chamonix Hockey Club - Ice Skating Club de Paris 1:3
