= 1929–30 French Ice Hockey Championship =

The 1929–30 French Ice Hockey Championship was the 14th edition of the French Ice Hockey Championship, the national ice hockey championship in France. Chamonix Hockey Club won the championship for the sixth time.

== Final ==
- Chamonix Hockey Club - Club des Sports d’Hiver de Paris 2:0 (1:0, 0:0, 1:0)
