= 1925–26 French Ice Hockey Championship =

The 1925–26 French Ice Hockey Championship was the 11th edition of the French Ice Hockey Championship, the national ice hockey championship in France. This year's champion is controversial. The official champion, as stated by the French Ice Hockey Federation, is Chamonix Hockey Club. However, some sports historians state that the season was won by Club des Sports d'Hiver de Paris, 1-0 over Chamonix, on January 25, 1926.
