= 1948–49 1re série season =

French professional ice hockey season

The 1948–49 1re série season was the 28th season of the 1re série, the top level of ice hockey in France. Eight teams participated in the league, and Chamonix Hockey Club won their 12th championship.

== First round ==
=== Paris Group ===
	Club
1.	Racing Club de France
2.	CSG Paris
3.	CO Billancourt
4.	Paris Université Club

=== Alpes Group ===
	Club
1.	Chamonix Hockey Club
2.	Ours de Villard-de-Lans
3.	CS Megève
4.	Diables Rouges de Briançon

== Final round ==
	Club	GP	W	T	L	GF	GA	Pts
1.	Chamonix Hockey Club	3	3	0	0	10	4	6
2.	CSG Paris	3	1	1	1	5	6	3
3.	Racing Club de France	3	1	0	2	9	8	2
4.	Ours de Villard-de-Lans	3	0	1	2	2	8	1
