= 1906–07 French Ice Hockey Championship =

The 1906–07 French Ice Hockey Championship was the first ice hockey championship staged in France. Sporting Club de Lyon won the championship by defeating Club des Patineurs de Paris.

== Final ==
- Sporting Club de Lyon - Club des Patineurs de Paris 8:2 (3:1, 5:1)
