= 1952–53 1re série season =

French professional ice hockey season

The 1952–53 1re série season was the 32nd season of the 1re série, the top level of ice hockey in France. Four teams participated in the final tournament, Paris Université Club won their first and only championship.

== Final tournament ==
	Club	GP	W	T	L	GF	GA	Pts
1.	Paris Université Club	3	2	1	0	21	10	5
2.	Chamonix Hockey Club	3	2	1	0	11	4	5
3.	Diables Rouges de Briançon	3	1	0	2	17	12	2
4.	CO Billancourt	3	0	0	3	9	32	0
