= 1907–08 French Ice Hockey Championship =

The 1907–08 French Ice Hockey Championship was the second season of the French Ice Hockey Championship, the national ice hockey championship in France. Club des Patineurs de Paris won their first championship.

== Final ==
- Sporting Club de Lyon - Club des Patineurs de Paris 1:2 (1:1, 0:1)
