= Patrick Francheterre =

French ice hockey player and executive (born 1948)

- Born: 19 November 1948 (age 77); Lille, France
- Education: Pasteur Institute of Lille
- Known for: Team France coach/manager FFHG director IIHF council member
- Awards: Paul Loicq Award
Ice hockey career
- Height: 174 cm (5 ft 9 in)
- Weight: 75 kg (165 lb; 11 st 11 lb)
- Position: Forward
- Shot: Right
- Played for: CPM Croix; Dogues de Bordeaux
- National team: France
- Playing career: 1967–1988

Patrick Francheterre (born 19 November 1948) is a French retired ice hockey player, coach, manager and international administrator. His playing career included time with CPM Croix and Dogues de Bordeaux as a player-coach, and with the France men's national ice hockey team at the Ice Hockey World Championships and the 1968 Winter Olympics. After retiring from playing, he served as the head coach of the national team, and two terms as its general manager. He later became a member of the International Ice Hockey Federation council and was honored with the Paul Loicq Award in 2017 for contributions to international ice hockey.

== Early life ==
Francheterre was born on 19 November 1948, in Lille, France. He began playing youth ice hockey in Lille at age 13. He attended the St-Pierre Institute in Lille from 1961 to 1966 and later graduated from the Pasteur Institute of Lille in 1969 with a bachelor's degree.

== Player-coach career ==
Francheterre began his professional ice hockey career in 1967 at age 18 with CPM Croix. In his second season, at age 19, he was named player-coach and continued in that role with the team until 1979. During his tenure with CPM Croix he also played with the France men's national ice hockey team at eight Ice Hockey World Championships from 1967 to 1977 and represented his nation in ice hockey at the 1968 Winter Olympics hosted in Grenoble, France.

Francheterre served as an assistant coach for the France men's national junior ice hockey team during the 1979 World Junior Ice Hockey Championships and the 1980 World Junior Ice Hockey Championships. He then became an assistant coach of the France men's national under-18 ice hockey team in 1981 and served as head coach of the under-18 team from 1982 until 1985 at the IIHF European Junior Championships.

In 1984, Francheterre became the player-coach for the Dogues de Bordeaux. He later served as head coach of the France men's national ice hockey team at the 1985 World Ice Hockey Championships in which France won Group C and earned a promotion. He returned as head coach for the 1986 Ice Hockey World Championships and led France to a fourth-place finish in Group B. He played another two seasons, but permanently retired in 1988.

=== Playing statistics ===
Playing statistics representing France at the Olympic Games and the Ice Hockey World Championships:

Year and event	Games	Goals	Assists	Points	Penalty minutes
1967 World Championships – Group C	?	?	?	?	?
1968 Winter Olympic Games – Group B	5	0	0	0	0
1970 World Championships – Group C	6	5	0	5	0
1971 World Championships – Group C	7	7	0	7	10
1973 World Championships – Group C	7	1	1	2	4
1974 World Championships – Group C	7	2	3	5	10
1975 World Championships – Group C	4	1	3	4	14
1976 World Championships – Group C	4	2	1	3	0
1977 World Championships – Group C	6	2	1	3	4
Totals	46	20	9	29	42

== Executive career ==
Francheterre began working for the French Ice Hockey Federation (FFHG) in 1992 as a director. He served as the general manager for the France national men's ice hockey team from 1993 to 1997, at the Ice Hockey World Championships and in ice hockey at the 1994 Winter Olympics. In July 1997, the FFHG went into bankruptcy and was put under the control of a court administrator. Due to the financial shortfall, Francheterre paid for the national team's medical staff expenses out of his pocket and sold surplus equipment to recuperate money. Later that summer, he was dismissed by the court administrator without being fully reimbursed, and he later filed an appeal under French labor laws stating that, "the administrator is not entitled to dismiss me, I am a state agent".

Francheterre returned to his former team in 1999, now known as the Boxers de Bordeaux and served as team president for two years. In 2001, he joined the International Ice Hockey Federation (IIHF) council as part of the IIHF technical committee and oversaw its European ice hockey tournaments.

Francheterre rejoined the France national men's ice hockey team as its general manager from 2004 to 2014. Under his leadership, the national team won silver medals at the 2005 IIHF World Championship Division I and 2006 IIHF World Championship Division I tournaments, then won gold at the 2007 IIHF World Championship Division I tournament and earned promotion to the top level for 2008. In 2011, he relocated the training camp for the national team to the Patinoire Charlemagne in Lyon to take advantage of improved facilities. He also stated the desire to see a Ligue Magnus team in the near future at the arena. In 2013, he said that Ligue Magnus was planning improvements to reach the level of other European national hockey league. He recommended decreasing the number of teams in the top tier of play and increasing the number of games to allow for a higher level of competition. He felt that hosting an IIHF event such as a World Championship would bring in needed income to fund future development and increase player registrations at the amateur levels. He also stated a desire to have more home-grown talent instead of players traveling to North America to play and attend school.

In 2017, the IIHF made Francheterre a Paul Loicq Award recipient for his outstanding contributions to international ice hockey.
