= 1932–33 1re série season =

French professional ice hockey season

The 1932–33 1re série season was the 17th season of the 1re série, the top level of ice hockey in France. Stade Français won their second championship.

== Tournament ==
=== Semifinals ===
- Stade Français - Central HC 3:2 OT (0:1, 1:1, 1:0, 1:0)
- Racing Club de France - Chamonix Hockey Club 3:1 (2:0, 0:1, 1:0)

=== Final ===
- Stade Français - Racing Club de France 1:0 (1:0, 0:0, 0:0)
