= 1989–90 Nationale 1A season =

French professional ice hockey season

The 1989–90 Nationale 1A season was the 69th season of the Nationale 1A, the top level of ice hockey in France. 10 teams participated in the league, and the Dragons de Rouen won the first league title. Ours de Villard-de-Lans and Hockey Club de Caen were relegated to the Nationale 1B.

== Regular season ==
	Club	GP	W	L	GF	GA	Pts
1.	Dragons de Rouen	36	27	9	230	106	42
2.	Français Volants	36	26	10	198	110	39
3.	Brûleurs de Loups de Grenoble	36	26	10	191	133	38
4.	HC Amiens Somme	36	25	11	162	126	36
5.	Bordeaux Gironde Hockey 2000	36	23	13	194	138	35
6.	ASG Tours	36	19	17	196	169	27
7.	Hockey Club de Reims	36	13	23	150	187	22
8.	Diables Rouges de Briançon	36	10	26	148	243	15
9.	Ours de Villard-de-Lans	36	7	29	125	217	11
10.	Hockey Club de Caen	36	4	32	121	286	5

== Playoffs ==
Semi-finals
Dragons de Rouen	2
HC Amiens Somme	0
Français Volants	1
Brûleurs de Loups de Grenoble	2

Final
Dragons de Rouen	2
Brûleurs de Loups de Grenoble	0
Third place
HC Amiens Somme	1
Français Volants	0
