= SC Lyon (ice hockey) =

Defunct ice hockey team in Lyon, France

- City: Lyon, France
- League: Ligue Magnus
- Founded: 1903

Franchise history
- 1903-1908: SC Lyon

SC Lyon was an ice hockey team in Lyon, France. They were founded in 1903 and played in the Ligue Magnus from 1906-1908, before folding.

== History ==
SC Lyon was one of the founding members of the Ligue Magnus in 1906-1907. They won the first French Championship by defeating Club des Patineurs de Paris 8-2 in the final. In 1907-1908, the two teams again faced each other for the title. On neutral ground in Chamonix, Patineurs was able to defeat Lyon 2-1 to win their first title. After the season, the Lyon Ice Palace closed, and the club was dissolved. With Lyon folding, the French Championship was not contested again until the 1911-1912 season.

== Achievements ==
- French champion: 1907.
- French runner-up: 1908.
