= Magnus Cup =

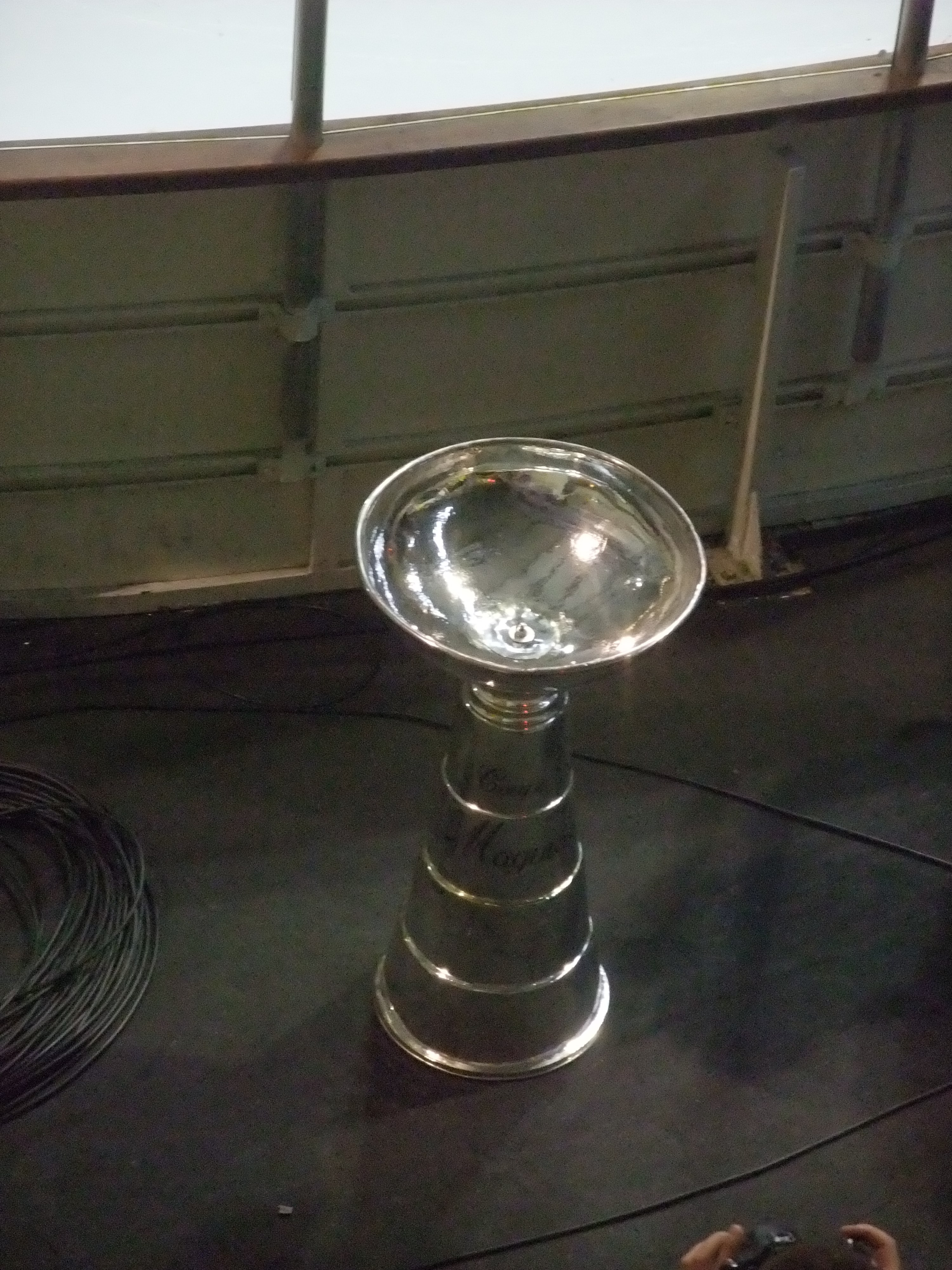
- Sport: Ice hockey
- Awarded for: Team that wins the playoffs of the Ligue Magnus

History
- First award: 1985
- Most recent: Rapaces de Gap

The Magnus Cup is the trophy presented to the winner of the Ligue Magnus (Magnus League) playoffs, and is named after Louis Magnus, first president of the International Ice Hockey Federation.
