= Besançon Hockey Club =

Sequanes de Besançon
- City: Besançon, France
- Founded: 1970
- Folded: 2003
- Home arena: Patinoire Lafayette

Besançon Hockey Club was an ice hockey team in Besançon, France. The club existed from 1970 to 2003. Besançon participated in the Ligue Magnus (then known as the Super 16) in the 2002–03 season. They folded after the first round due to financial problems.
