= 1990–91 Ligue nationale season =

French ice hockey league season

The 1990–91 Ligue nationale season was the 70th season of the Ligue nationale. Eight teams participated in the league, and Brûleurs de Loups de Grenoble won their third league title.

== Regular season ==
	Club	GP	W	L	GF	GA	Pts
1.	Dragons de Rouen	28	24	4	169	85	48
2.	Diables Rouges de Briançon	28	20	8	138	92	40
3.	Brûleurs de Loups de Grenoble	28	17	11	127	93	34
4.	Bordeaux Gironde Hockey 2000	28	17	11	154	118	34
5.	Hockey Club de Reims	28	14	14	111	122	28
6.	HC Amiens Somme	28	11	17	92	110	22
7.	ASG Tours	28	6	22	106	210	12
8.	Français Volants	28	3	25	90	157	6

== Playoffs ==
Quarter-finals
Diables Rouges de Briançon	3
ASG Tours	0
Brûleurs de Loups de Grenoble	3
HC Amiens Somme	1
Dragons de Rouen	3
Français Volants	1
Bordeaux Gironde Hockey 2000	3
Hockey Club de Reims	0

Semi-finals
Diables Rouges de Briançon	1
Brûleurs de Loups de Grenoble	3
Dragons de Rouen	3
Bordeaux Gironde Hockey 2000	0

Final
Brûleurs de Loups de Grenoble	2
Dragons de Rouen	0
