= 1986–87 Nationale 1A season =

French professional ice hockey season

The 1986–87 Nationale 1A season was the 66th season of the Nationale 1A, the top level of ice hockey in France. 10 teams participated in the league, and Mont-Blanc HC won their first league title. Viry-Châtillon Essonne Hockey was relegated to the Nationale 1B.

== Regular season ==
| | Club | GP | W | T | L | GF | GA | Pts |
|---|---|---|---|---|---|---|---|---|
| 1. | Mont-Blanc HC | 36 | 32 | 2 | 2 | 294 | 103 | 66 |
| 2. | Français Volants | 36 | 23 | 4 | 9 | 236 | 151 | 50 |
| 3. | Gap Hockey Club | 36 | 21 | 6 | 9 | 223 | 143 | 48 |
| 4. | HC Amiens Somme | 36 | 19 | 4 | 13 | 195 | 188 | 42 |
| 5. | Ours de Villard-de-Lans | 36 | 17 | 5 | 14 | 198 | 156 | 39 |
| 6. | CSG Grenoble | 36 | 11 | 4 | 21 | 180 | 226 | 26 |
| 7. | Chamonix Hockey Club | 36 | 11 | 2 | 23 | 148 | 225 | 24 |
| 8. | Diables Rouges de Briançon | 36 | 10 | 3 | 23 | 164 | 262 | 23 |
| 9. | Dragons de Rouen | 36 | 9 | 4 | 23 | 171 | 237 | 22 |
| 10. | Viry-Châtillon Essonne Hockey | 36 | 9 | 2 | 25 | 185 | 303 | 20 |
