= Paris Université Club (ice hockey) =

French ice hockey team

Paris Université Club was an ice hockey team in Paris, France. The team was a member of the Paris Université Club association.

== History ==
The club first participated in the 1re série, the top level French ice hockey league, in the 1948-49 season. They won the league title in the 1952-53 season. Their last appearance in the 1re série came in the 1954-55 season.

== Achievements ==
- French champion (1): 1953.
