= CPM Croix =

- City: Croix, France
- Founded: 1966
- Home arena: Patinoire de la métropole

Franchise history
- 1966-1991: CPM Croix

CPM Croix was an ice hockey team in Croix, France. The club existed from 1966-1991.

== History ==
Croix was founded in 1966 and frequently participated in the top-level French leagues between 1966 and 1979. After being relegated from the Nationale A following the 1978-79 season, they did not participate in the top-level league again.

Patrick Francheterre served as player-coach of CPM Croix from 1968 to 1979. The club reached the finals of the Coupe de France in 1975 and 1978.
