= US Métro (ice hockey) =

- City: Paris, France
- Founded: 1951
- Home arena: Patinoire de Saint Didier

Franchise history
- 1951-1971: US Métro
- 1971-2005: OHC Paris-Viry
- 2005-2011: Viry-Châtillon Essonne Hockey
- 2011-present: Viry Hockey 91

US Métro was an ice hockey team in Paris, France. The club existed from 1951 to 1971 and was part of the US Métro sports club

== History ==
The hockey section of the US Métro sports club was founded by Claude Portanel in 1951. They first participated in the top-level French league in the 1954-55 season.

The club frequently participated in the top-level of French ice hockey until after the conclusion of the 1970-71 season.

Claude Pourtanel acquired the ice rink Patinoire privée de Viry-Châtillon in 1971. The club then became independent from the US Métro sports club and OHC Paris-Viry was created.
