= Stade Français (ice hockey) =

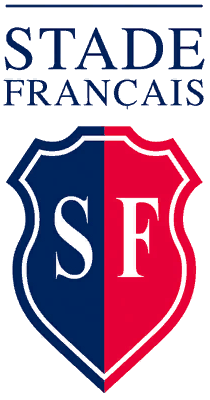
- City: Paris, France
- Founded: 1931
- Dissolved: 1940

Franchise history
- 1931-1933: Stade Français
- 1933-1934: Rapides de Paris
- 1934-1937: Stade Français
- 1937-1940: Rapides de Paris

Stade Français was an ice hockey team in Paris, France. They were a member of the Stade Français sports association.

== History ==
The ice hockey section of Stade Français was founded in 1931. They won the 1re série four years in a row from 1932-1935. The club was also known as the Rapides de Paris from 1933-1934 and 1937-1940. They folded in 1940.

== Achievements ==
- French champion (4): 1932, 1933, 1934, 1935.
