= Ligue Magnus =

Top men's division of the French ice hockey pyramid

- Current season, competition or edition: 2024–25 Ligue Magnus season
- Formerly: Championnat de France (1907–1930); 1re Série (1930–1973); Série A (1973–1975); Nationale A (1975–1985); Nationale 1A (1985–1990, 1996–1997); Ligue nationale (1990–1991); Élite (1991–1992, 1994–1996, 1997–2002); Nationale 1 (1992–1994); Super 16 (2002–2004); Ligue Magnus (2004–)
- Sport: Ice hockey
- Founded: 1906; 120 years ago
- No. of teams: 12
- Country: France
- Most recent champion: Grenoble (9)
- Most titles: Chamonix (30)
- Broadcasters: Sport en France; BFM Locales
- Streaming partners: Magnus.TV; RMC Sport on YouTube and Twitch
- Relegation to: FFHG Division 1
- Domestic cup: Coupe de France
- Website: liguemagnus.com

The Ligue Magnus, currently known as Synerglace Ligue Magnus for sponsorship reasons, is the top men's division of the French ice hockey pyramid, established in 1906. The league operated under a variety of names before taking that of its championship trophy, the Magnus Cup, in 2004. The trophy was in turn named for Frenchman and IIHF founder Louis Magnus.

Teams from the Ligue Magnus can participate in the IIHF's annual Champions Hockey League (CHL), competing for the European Trophy. Participation is based on the strength of the various leagues in Europe (excluding the Eurasian Kontinental Hockey League). Going into the 2022–23 CHL season, the Ligue Magnus was ranked the No. 9 league in Europe, allowing them to send their top team to compete in the CHL.

== Format ==
12 teams play a 44-game regular season. The schedule is fully balanced and there are no geographic conferences. Regulation wins are worth 3 points, as per international rules. The top 8 teams qualify for the Magnus Cup playoffs, with all series contested in a best-of-seven format. The remaining 4 teams play a 6-game round-robin, at the end of which the last-place team is relegated.

The Magnus Cup champions qualify for the following season's Champions Hockey League. All Ligue Magnus teams also take part in the French Cup.

== Import rule ==
Game night rosters must include at least 10 players who have spent 3 or more years in the French hockey system before the age of 21. French citizenship itself is not a requirement to qualify for non-import status, as long as the player meets the above criteria. Conversely, a citizen of France who was fully trained in a foreign country will count as an import regardless of his French citizenship.

== Outdoor games ==
On 22 December 2013 Grenoble and Briançon played an outdoor regular season game at Stade des Alpes, the home of former Ligue 1 soccer club GF38. A sellout attendance of 19,767 set a league record.
Another outdoor game took place on 30 December 2016, when Lyon hosted Grenoble at Parc OL, the home field of seven-time Ligue 1 champions Olympique Lyonnais. The event drew a record 25,182 attendance.

== Title sponsors ==
In 2016, the league signed its first naming rights deal with Saxoprint, the online printing subsidiary of German conglomerate Cewe, and became known as Saxoprint Ligue Magnus for the following two seasons. In 2018, mobile ice rink supplier Synerglace became the series' new title sponsor.

== Media ==
=== Television ===
Since the 2020–21 season, select regular season and playoff games have aired on free cable and broadband television channel Sport en France. Starting with the 2024–25 campaign, another package of games has been made available in their local markets through affiliates of the free, over-the-air BFM Régions network (today BFM Locales).

=== Internet streaming ===
From the 2016–17 season, all of the league's games have been accessible via live internet streaming. Originally broadcast through a third-party platform, they moved in 2024 to a proprietary subscription service, Magnus.TV, managed by Swedish company Sportway Media Group on behalf of the French federation. Starting in the 2025–26 season, select games are also being shown for free on the YouTube and Twitch channels of RMC Sport, which belongs to the same group as BFM Locales.

=== Video game ===
Hockey Dangles '16: Saxoprint Magnus Edition, an arcade-style mobile video game based on the league, was released for Android and iOS devices in September 2016.

== 2025/26 teams ==
Teams currently participating in the Ligue Magnus

Team	City	Arena	Founded
Gothiques	Amiens	Coliséum	1967
Ducs	Angers	IceParc	1982
Hormadi	Anglet	Patinoire de la Barre	1969
Boxers	Bordeaux	Patinoire de Mériadeck	1999
Diables Rouges	Briançon	Patinoire René Froger	1934
Jokers	Cergy-Pontoise	Aren'Ice	1981
Pionniers	Chamonix	Centre Sportif Richard Bozon	2016
Rapaces	Gap	Alp'Arena	1937
Brûleurs de Loups	Grenoble	Patinoire Pole Sud	1963
Spartiates	Marseille	Palais omnisports Marseille Grand-Est	2012
Aigles	Nice	Patinoire Jean Bouin	1969
Dragons	Rouen	Patinoire de l'Île Lacroix	1982

=== Former teams ===
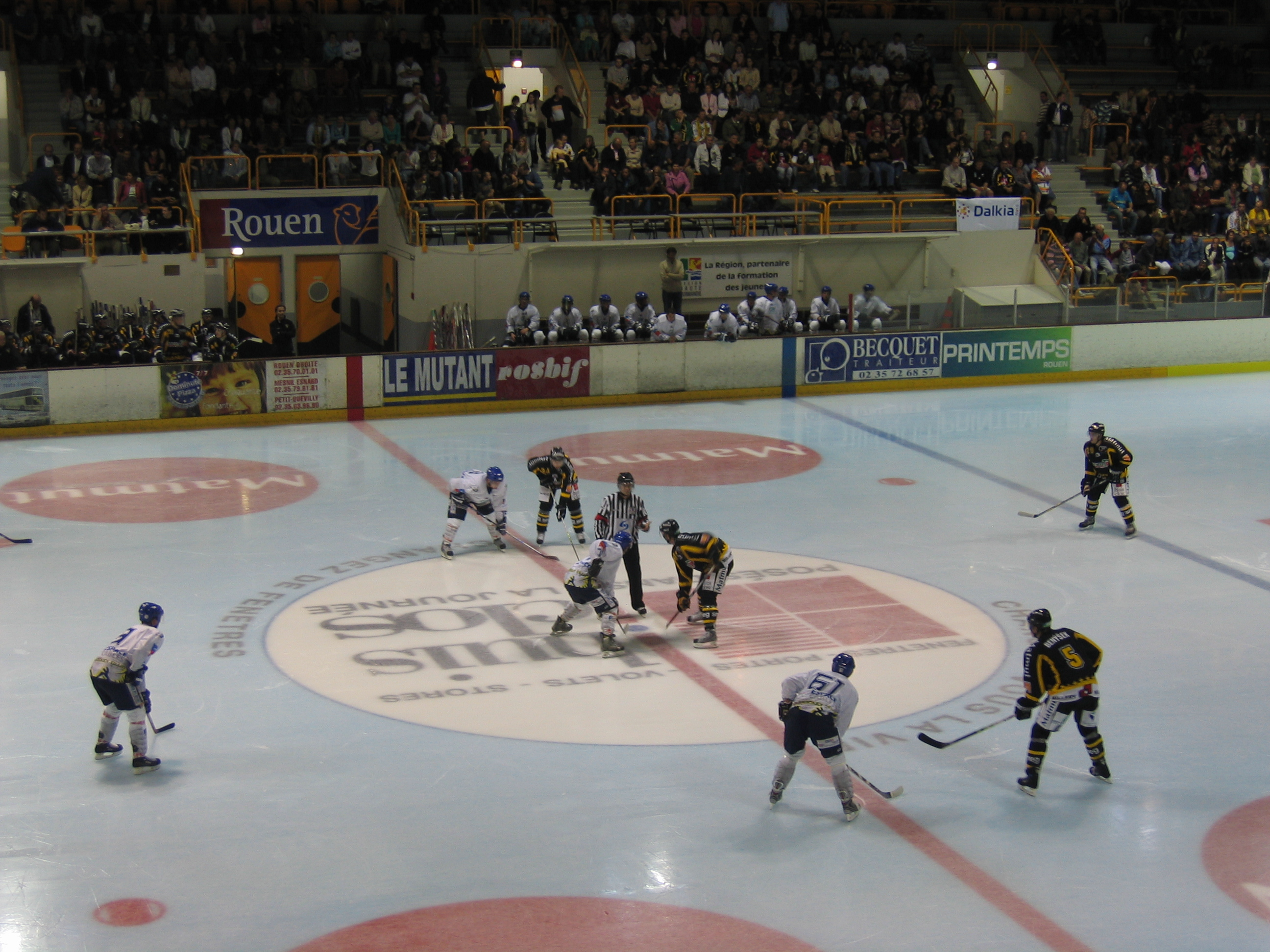
Ligue Magnus game in 2007

2004-13 logo

2013-16 logo

- Albatros de Brest
- Chamois de Chamonix
- Corsaires de Dunkerque
- Drakkars de Caen
- Ducs de Dijon
- Jets de Viry-Essonne
- Ours de Villard-de-Lans
- Pingouins de Morzine-Avoriaz
- Sangliers Arvernes de Clermont-Ferrand
- Scorpions de Mulhouse
- Avalanche du Mont-Blanc

=== Defunct teams ===
- Diables Noirs de Tours
- Flammes Bleues de Reims
- LHC Les Lions
- Mulhouse Scorpions
- Séquanes de Besançon

== Previous winners ==
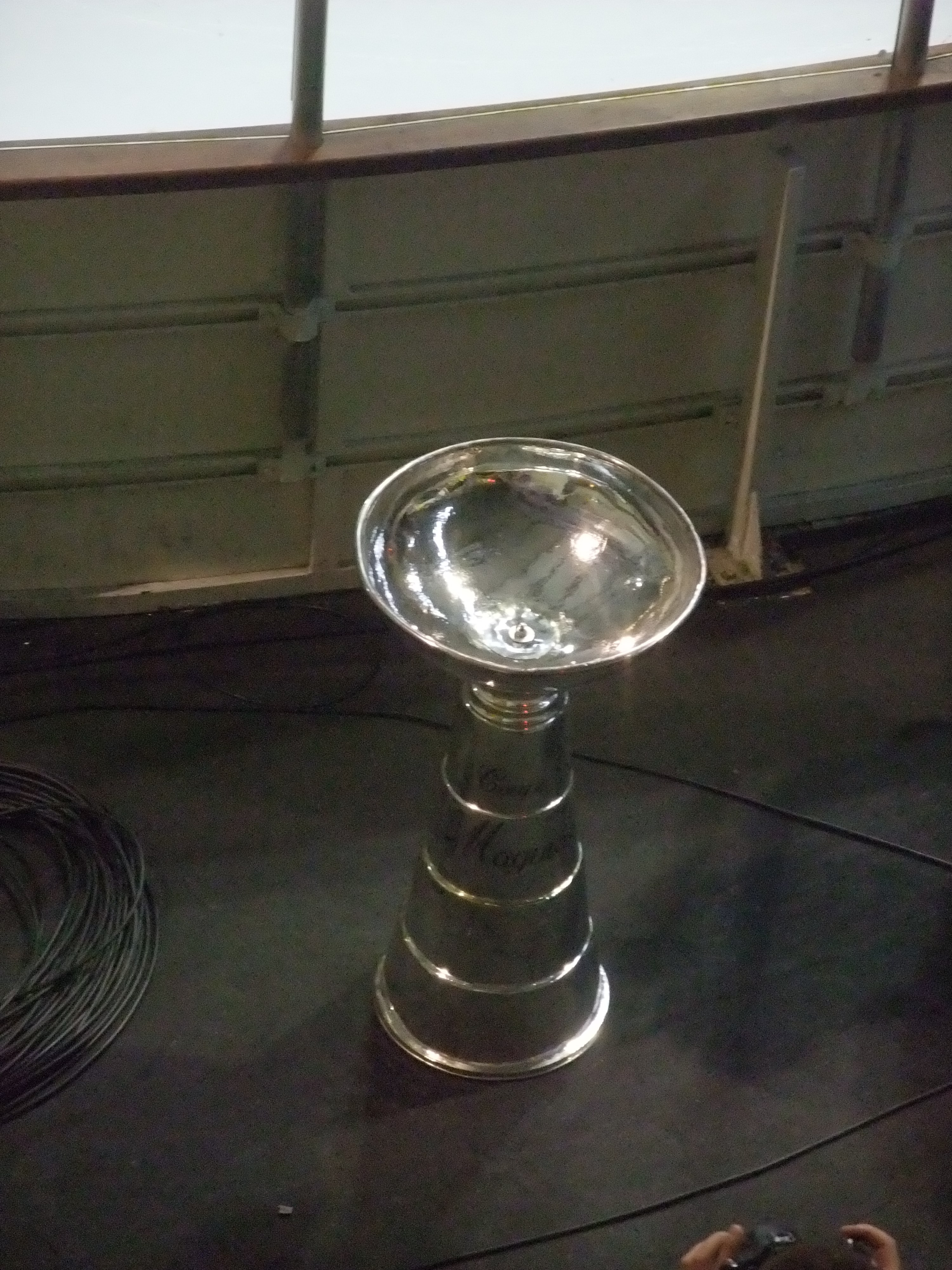
Ligue Magnus champion trophy

- 1907 : SC Lyon
- 1908 : Patineurs de Paris
- 1912 : Patineurs de Paris
- 1913 : Patineurs de Paris
- 1914 : Patineurs de Paris
- 1915 to 1919 : Not held due to World War I
- 1920 : Ice Skating Club de Paris
- 1921 : Sports d'Hiver de Paris
- 1922 : Sports d'Hiver de Paris
- 1923 : Chamonix
- 1925 : Chamonix
- 1926 : Chamonix
- 1927 : Chamonix
- 1929 : Chamonix
- 1930 : Chamonix
- 1931 : Chamonix
- 1932 : Stade Français Paris
- 1933 : Stade Français Paris
- 1934 : Rapides de Paris
- 1935 : Stade Français Paris
- 1936 : Français Volants Paris
- 1937 : Français Volants Paris
- 1938 : Français Volants Paris
- 1939 : Chamonix
- 1941 : The final between Briançon and Paris Université Club
  was not held due to World War II
- 1942 : Chamonix
- 1944 : Chamonix
- 1946 : Chamonix
- 1949 : Chamonix
- 1950 : Racing Club de Paris
- 1951 : Racing Club de Paris
- 1952 : Chamonix
- 1953 : Paris Université Club
- 1954 : Chamonix
- 1955 : Chamonix
- 1956 : CP Lyon
- 1957 : AC Boulogne-Billancourt
- 1958 : Chamonix
- 1959 : Chamonix
- 1960 : AC Boulogne-Billancourt
- 1961 : Chamonix
- 1962 : AC Boulogne-Billancourt
- 1963 : Chamonix
- 1964 : Chamonix
- 1965 : Chamonix
- 1966 : Chamonix
- 1967 : Chamonix
- 1968 : Chamonix
- 1969 : Saint-Gervais
- 1970 : Chamonix
- 1971 : Chamonix
- 1972 : Chamonix
- 1973 : Chamonix
- 1974 : Saint-Gervais
- 1975 : Saint-Gervais
- 1976 : Chamonix
- 1977 : Gap
- 1978 : Gap
- 1979 : Chamonix
- 1980 : ASG Tours
- 1981 : CSG Grenoble
- 1982 : CSG Grenoble
- 1983 : Saint-Gervais
- 1984 : Megève
- 1985 : Saint-Gervais
- 1986 : Saint-Gervais
- 1987 : Mont-Blanc
- 1988 : Mont-Blanc
- 1989 : Français Volants Paris
- 1990 : Rouen
- 1991 : CSG Grenoble
- 1992 : Rouen
- 1993 : Rouen
- 1994 : Rouen
- 1995 : Rouen
- 1996 : Brest
- 1997 : Brest
- 1998 : Grenoble
- 1999 : Amiens Somme
- 2000 : Reims HC
- 2001 : Rouen
- 2002 : Reims HC
- 2003 : Rouen
- 2004 : Amiens Somme
- 2005 : Hockey Club de Mulhouse
- 2006 : Rouen
- 2007 : Grenoble
- 2008 : Rouen
- 2009 : Grenoble
- 2010 : Rouen
- 2011 : Rouen
- 2012 : Rouen
- 2013 : Rouen
- 2014 : Briançon
- 2015 : Gap
- 2016 : Rouen
- 2017 : Gap
- 2018 : Rouen
- 2019 : Grenoble
- 2020 : not awarded (Note: Due to the impact of the COVID-19 pandemic in France, the full regular season was played but the 2020 play-offs were cancelled, and no team was crowned Magnus Cup champion for the 2019–20 season.)
- 2021 : Rouen (Note: Due to the impact of the COVID-19 pandemic in France, the regular season was terminated at its mid-point, the 2021 play-offs were cancelled, and (unlike 2019–20) regular season champion Rouen were crowned Magnus Cup champion of France for the 2020–21 season.)
- 2022 : Grenoble
- 2023 : Rouen
- 2024 : Rouen
- 2025 : Grenoble
- 2026 : Bordeaux

== Titles by team ==
Pl	Team	Titles	Winning seasons
1	Chamonix	30	1923, 1925, 1926, 1927, 1929, 1930, 1931, 1939, 1942, 1944, 1946, 1949, 1952, 1954, 1955, 1958, 1959, 1961, 1963, 1964, 1965, 1966, 1967, 1968, 1970, 1971, 1972, 1973, 1976, 1979
2	Rouen (earlier known as RHC (Rouen Hockey Club) and also known as Rouen Hockey Élite 76)	18	1990, 1992, 1993, 1994, 1995, 2001, 2003, 2006, 2008, 2010, 2011, 2012, 2013, 2016, 2018, 2021, 2023, 2024
3	Grenoble (earlier known as CSG Grenoble)	9	1981, 1982, 1991, 1998, 2007, 2009, 2019, 2022, 2025
4	Club des Patineurs de Paris (also known as Ice Skating Club de Paris and Sports d'Hiver de Paris)	7	1908, 1912, 1913, 1914, 1920, 1921, 1922
5	Saint-Gervais	6	1969, 1974, 1975, 1983, 1985, 1986
6	Français Volants Paris	4	1936, 1937, 1938, 1989
7	Gap	4	1977, 1978, 2015, 2017
8	Stade Français Paris (also known as Rapides de Paris)	4	1932, 1933, 1934, 1935
9	AC Boulogne-Billancourt	3	1957, 1960, 1962
10	Brest	2	1996, 1997
	Mont-Blanc	2	1987, 1988
	Racing Club de Paris	2	1950, 1951
	Reims HC	2	2000, 2002
	Amiens Somme	2	1999, 2004
15	Megève	1	1984
	CP Lyon	1	1956
	SC Lyon	1	1907
	ASG Tours	1	1980
	Paris Université Club	1	1953
	Hockey Club de Mulhouse	1	2005
	Briançon	1	2014

== Awards ==
- Charles Ramsay Trophy (top scorer)
- Albert Hassler Trophy (most valuable French player)
- Marcel Claret Trophy (most sportsmanlike team)
- Raymond Dewas Trophy (most sportsmanlike player)
- Jean-Pierre Graff Trophy (most promising player)
- Jean Ferrand Trophy (most valuable goaltender)
- Camil Gélinas Trophy (coach of the year)

== Notable players ==
- Philippe Bozon (St. Louis Blues, Genève-Servette HC)
- Alain Daigle (Chicago Blackhawks)
- Evgeny Davydov (HC CSKA Moscow, Winnipeg Jets)
- Steve Gainey (Dallas Stars, Phoenix Coyotes)
- Cristobal Huet (Los Angeles Kings, Montreal Canadiens, Washington Capitals, Chicago Blackhawks)
- Steve Montador (Calgary Flames, Florida Panthers, Anaheim Ducks, Boston Bruins, Buffalo Sabres)
- Steven Reinprecht (Calgary Flames, Colorado Avalanche, Florida Panthers, Los Angeles Kings, Phoenix Coyotes)
- Mark Rycroft (St. Louis Blues, Colorado Avalanche)
- Richard Sévigny (Montreal Canadiens, Quebec Nordiques)
- Claude Verret (Buffalo Sabres, Lausanne HC, Rochester Americans)

In addition, Bob Gainey (Montreal Canadiens) and Brian Propp (Philadelphia Flyers) have played in the second tier of French hockey.
