= Jets de Viry-Essonne =

- City: Viry-Châtillon, France
- League: FFHG Division 2
- Home arena: Patinoire des Lacs de l'Essonne
- Colours: Yellow, Green, White

Franchise history
- 1951-1971: US Métro
- 1971-2005: OHC Paris-Viry
- 2005-2011: Jets de Viry-Essonne

The Jets de Viry-Essonne were an ice hockey team in Viry-Châtillon, France. The club was founded in 1951 as the hockey department of the US Métro sports club, and took on the name OHC Paris-Viry in 1971. The club was dissolved in 2011, and were replaced by Viry Hockey 91, which began play in the FFHG Division 3 in 2011-12.

They played in the top-level of French ice hockey from 1971-1987, with the exception of 1975, when they played in the Nationale 1B. They also participated in the top-level French league yearly from 1991-2001.

== Achievements ==
- French runner-up : 1980.
- FFHG Division 1 champion : 1975, 1988, 1991.
- FFHG Division 2 champion : 1983
