= Club des Patineurs Lyonnais =

Club des patineurs lyonnais
- City: Lyon, France
- Founded: 1953
- Home arena: Palais de Glace, avenue Jean-Jaurès

Franchise history
- 1953-1997: Club des patineurs lyonnais

Club des patineurs lyonnais was an ice hockey team in Lyon, France.

== History ==
The club was founded in 1953. They won the 1re série and were French champions in the 1955-56 season. Following their lone championship the club continued to frequently participate in the top-level French leagues. Their last appearance came during the 1982–83 Nationale A season.

In 1997, Club des patineurs lyonnais went bankrupt, and the Lyon Hockey Club was founded as a successor club.

== Achievements ==
- French champion (1): 1956.
- FFHG Division 2 champion (2): 1972, 1989.
