= Diables Noirs de Tours =

- Nickname: Diables Noirs (Black Devils)
- City: Tours (France)
- League: Ligue Magnus
- Founded: 1972
- Folded: 2010
- Home arena: Patinoire municipale de Tours (capacity: 1760)
- Colours
- President: Laurent Bordas
- Head coach: (Canada) Robert Millette
- Website: Les Diables Noirs

Franchise history
- Association des sports de glace de Tours

Association des sports de glace de Tours is a former French ice hockey team based in Tours. The team was champion of Magnus league in 1980 and folded in 2010. The team was also known as "Diables noirs de Tours" (Tours Black Devils).

The team was founded in 1972 and played home games at the Patinoire municipale de Tours.

== Notable players ==
(Canada)

- Mike Clarke
- Devon Smith
- Brendon Smith
- Philippe Ringuette
- Thomas Sychterz
- Michaël Tessier
- Jason D'Ascanio

(Czech Republic)

- Lukas Krejci
- Roman Novotny

(Israel)

- Alon Eizenman

(Italy)

- Adam Russo

(Poland)

- Sebastian Wachowski

(Slovakia)

- Peter Lietava
- Vladimir Sabol
