= Athletic Club de Boulogne-Billancourt (ice hockey) =

Tigres de l'ACBB
- City: Boulogne-Billancourt, Hauts-de-Seine, France
- Founded: 1951
- Folded: 2024
- Home arena: Patinoire de Boulogne-Billancourt
- Colours: Grey, orange

The Tigres de l'ACBB (lit. 'ACBB Tigers') were an ice hockey team based in Boulogne-Billancourt, Hauts-de-Seine, France. They were a member of multisports organization Athletic Club de Boulogne-Billancourt. The hockey section was created in 1951 and folded in 2024, due to the closure of their historic ice rink.

== History ==
ACBB enjoyed success in the Ligue Magnus (then known as the 1re série) in the 1950s and 1960s, winning three league titles and finishing as runner-up seven times. They also won the Spengler Cup three years in a row from 1959 to 1961. The club forfeited the entire 1971-72 season after playing in only one game. ACBB has participated solely in the lower-level French leagues since then. In 2013, the club added the nickname Les Tigres to its administrative moniker. In Spring 2024, Boulogne-Billancourt mayor Pierre-Christophe Baguet opted to cut funding to the city's ice rink, and the club folded at the end of that year.

== Achievements ==
- Ligue Magnus
  - Champion (3) : 1957, 1960, 1962.
  - Runner-up (7) : 1958, 1959, 1961, 1963, 1964, 1965, 1966.
- Spengler Cup
  - Champion (3) : 1959, 1960, 1961.
- Basler Cup
  - 3rd place : 1961.
