= Club des Sports de Megève =

Ice hockey team

- City: Megève, France
- Home arena: Palais des sports de Megève
- Colours: Green, white

Franchise history
- 1923-present: Club des Sports de Megève

The Boucs de Megève (official name: Club des Sports de Megève) is an ice hockey team in Megève, France.

== History ==
The club was founded by Jean Motte in 1923, but wasn't officially registered until July 17, 1931. Starting in the 1950s, the team regularly participated in the top-level French league. Their biggest achievement was winning the French league title in the 1983-84 season. For the 1986-87 season, the club merged with Sporting Hockey Club Saint Gervais to form Mont-Blanc HC. Due to financial problems of Mont-Blanc HC, the clubs became independent again in 1989. This would last until 2002, when the clubs merged again. Since the re-merger with Mont-Blanc, Megève has consisted solely of a junior section.

== Achievements ==
- French champion (1): 1984.
