= Club des Patineurs de Paris =

- City: Paris, France
- League: Ligue Magnus
- Founded: 1902
- Colours: Blue, White

Franchise history
- 1902-1914: Club des Patineurs de Paris
- 1919-1921: Ice Skating Club de Paris
- 1921-1937: Club des Sports d'Hiver de Paris

Club des Patineurs de Paris was an ice hockey team in Paris, France. They played in the top-level of French ice hockey from 1906-1937.

== History ==
The club was founded on February 20, 1896 as a figure skating association. The hockey section was created in 1902. They were founding members of the French Ice Hockey Championship for the 1906-07 season. They were defeated by SC Lyon in the final by a score 8-2.

In the 1908 season, they played against SC Lyon on a neutral site in Chamonix, and won their first French championship by defeating them 8=2. After the 1908 season, the ice rink in Lyon was closed, which forced SC Lyon to disband. The championship was abandoned until 1912 as a result. When it was restarted, Patineurs won the next three titles, in 1912, 1913, and 1914.

The club was disbanded at the start of World War I. They were re-founded as the Ice Skating Club de Paris in 1919 and won the French Championship under this name in 1920 and 1921. They were renamed Club des Sports d'Hiver de Paris in 1921 and won the French Championship for the third consecutive season in 1922. The club folded in 1937.

== Achievements ==
- French champion (7): 1908, 1912, 1913, 1914, 1920, 1921, 1922.
