= Sporting Hockey Club Saint Gervais =

French ice hockey club

The Sporting Club Saint Gervais (also known as the Saint-Gervais Eagles) is a French ice hockey team based in Saint-Gervais-les-Bains in Haute-Savoie. The club won six Ligue Magnus titles (1969, 1974, 1975, 1983, 1985 and 1986), two Coupe de France (1976, 1981) and the As Cup in 1985. Starting in the 2002–2003 season, SHC Saint Gervais merged with the Club des Sports de Megève to form the Avalanche du Mont-Blanc which currently plays in the FFHG Division 1, the second level of the French ice hockey leagues system.
