= Français Volants de Paris =

- City: Paris, France
- League: FFHG Division 2
- Founded: 1933
- Home arena: Patinoire Sonja-Henie Paris
- Colours: Blue and white

Franchise history
- 1933-present: Français Volants

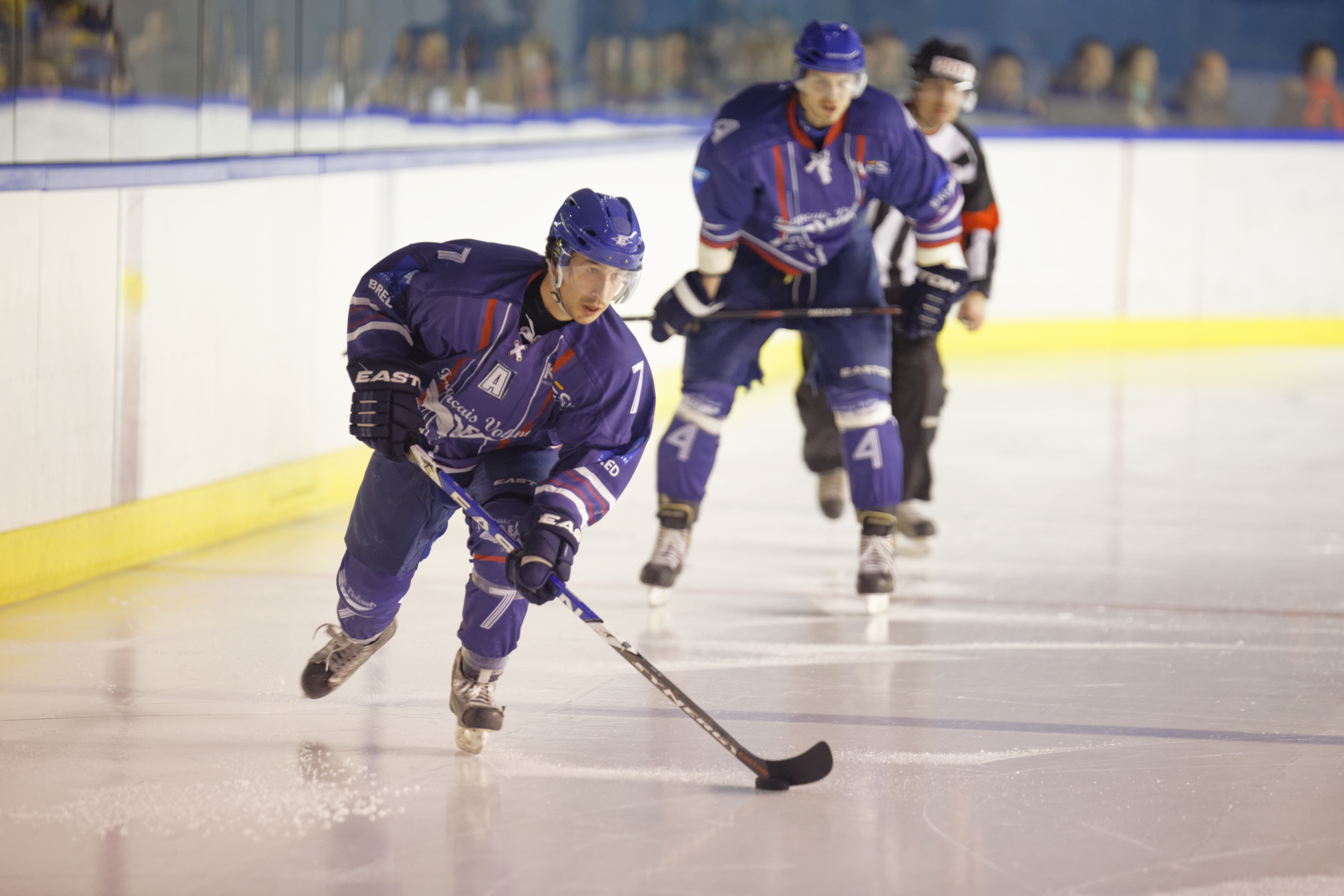

Français Volants is an ice hockey team in Paris, France. They are currently playing in FFHG Division 2, the third level of French ice hockey.

== History ==
The club was founded in 1933 by Jacques Lacarrière, a French ice hockey player.

Volants regularly participated in the top-level of French ice hockey from the 1930s until the 1990s, winning the championship four times, in 1936, 1937, 1938, and 1989. They also won the Coupe de France in 1987. Their last appearance in the highest-level league came during the 1990-91 season.

The club currently plays in the third-level French league, the FFHG Division 2.

== Achievements ==
- French champion (4): 1936, 1937, 1938, 1989.
- Coupe de France champion (1): 1987.

== Notable players ==
- André Peloffy (born 1951), French ice hockey player
- Patrice Lefebvre (born 1967), Canadian-born Italian ice hockey player
- Eliezer Sherbatov (born 1991), Canadian-Israeli ice hockey player
