= Ours de Villard-de-Lans =

- Nickname: Ours (Bears)
- City: Villard-de-Lans (France)
- League: FFHG Division 1; 2024-present FFHG Division 2; 2014-2024; Ligue Magnus; 2002-2014
- Founded: 1931
- Home arena: Patinoire municipale de Villard-de-Lans
- Colours: Blue, yellow and white
- President: (France) Daniel Huillier
- Head coach: (United States) Rich Metro
- Website: Les Ours

Championships
- Division 2: 1 (2024)

Ours de Villard-de-Lans (Villard-de-Lans Bears) is a French ice hockey team based in Villard-de-Lans playing in the FFHG Division 2.

The team was founded in 1931 and plays home games at the Patinoire municipale de Villard-de-Lans.

== Season-by-season results ==
Former logo

=== Division 1 ===
Season	GP	W	OTW	OTL	L	Pts	GF	GA	Finish	Playoffs
2024–25	30	5	3	3	19	24	70	121	16th	Saved in relegation, 3–1 (Brest Albatros Hockey)

== Former players ==
- Aurélien Chabot
- César Lefranc
- Yann Marez
- Clément Masson
- Pierre-Antoine Simonneau
- Jim Smith

== Notable players ==
- Derek Haas
- Guy Dupuis
- Corrado Micalef
- Jeff Lerg

== Trophies and awards ==
- Ligue Magnus (French Championship):
  - (x5) 1962, 1967, 1968, 1975, 1978
- French Cup:
  - (x2) 1977, 2003
