= Chamonix HC =

Ice hockey team in France

Chamois de Chamonix
- Nickname: Chamois
- City: Chamonix (France)
- League: Ligue Magnus; 2005–2016
- Founded: 1910
- Folded: 2016
- Home arena: Centre Sportif Richard Bozon (capacity: 2400)
- Colours
- Captain: Clément Masson
- Website: Les Chamois

Franchise history
- Chamonix Hockey Club: Hockey Club Chamonix-Mont-Blanc (1910–?)

Previous logo

Chamonix Hockey Club was a French professional ice hockey team based in Chamonix that last played in the Ligue Magnus in 2015. The team is also known as Chamois de Chamonix (Chamonix Chamois).

With 30 championship titles, Chamonix was the most successful French club in ice hockey.

The team was founded in 1910. In 2010, the club celebrated its 100th birthday.

In 2016, the team merged with Pingouins de Morzine-Avoriaz to form the Pionniers De Chamonix-Morzine.

== Titles ==
French champion (30) earned in 1923, 1925, 1926, 1927, 1929, 1930, 1931, 1939, 1942, 1944, 1946, 1949, 1952, 1954, 1955, 1958, 1959, 1961, 1963, 1964, 1965, 1966, 1967, 1968, 1970, 1971, 1972, 1973, 1976, and 1979

== Former players ==
(Finland)

- Riku Silvennoinen
- Juho Mielonen
- Ilpo Salmivirta

(France)

- Clement Masson
- Lou Bogdanoff
- Jeremy Ares
- Clement Colombin
- Matthias Terrier
- Jordan Mugnier
- Arnaud Hascoet
- Damien Torfou
- Jimmy Darier
- Henri-Corentin Buysse
- Joris Bedin
- Patxi Biscard
- Florian Hardy

(Sweden)

- Henric Andersen

(Canada)

- Luc Tardif
- Pierre-Luc Lessard
- Randy Cameron
- Dominic Jalbert
- Matt Bissonnette
- Michael Beaudry
- Julien Tremblay
- Louis Côté

== Former coaches ==
- Alan Jacob
