= Jonathan Zwikel =

French ice hockey player

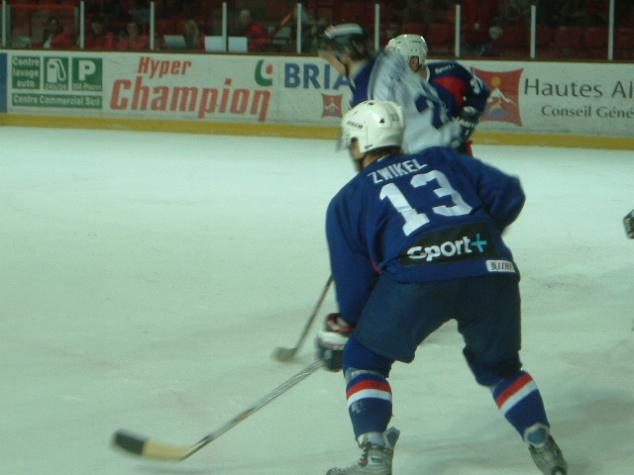
- Jonathan Zwikel in 2004
- Born: 16 July 1975 (age 50) Brussels, Belgium
- Height: 6 ft 0 in (183 cm)
- Weight: 192 lb (87 kg; 13 st 10 lb)
- Position: Center
- Shot: Left
- Played for: Dragons de Rouen; Hockey Club de Reims; IF Sundsvall Hockey; EV Duisburg; Gothiques d'Amiens; Pingouins de Morzine-Avoriaz
- National team: France
- NHL draft: Undrafted
- Playing career: 1993–2011

Jonathan Zwikel (born 16 July 1975) is a retired French ice hockey player. He competed in the men's tournaments at the 1998 Winter Olympics and the 2002 Winter Olympics. He is the son-in-law of Luc Tardif, and brother-in-law of Luc Tardif Jr.

== Career statistics ==
			Regular season					Playoffs
Season	Team	League	GP	G	A	Pts	PIM	GP	G	A	Pts	PIM
1993–94	Dragons de Rouen	France	10	0	0	0	29	—	—	—	—	—
1994–95	Dragons de Rouen	France	21	2	3	5	2	—	—	—	—	—
1995–96	Hockey Club de Reims	France	25	6	7	13	12	—	—	—	—	—
1996–97	Hockey Club de Reims	France	31	19	22	41	30	—	—	—	—	—
1997–98	Hockey Club de Reims	France	35	11	18	29	78	—	—	—	—	—
1998–99	Hockey Club de Reims	France	4	2	3	5	0	—	—	—	—	—
1999–00	Hockey Club de Reims	France	40	13	28	41	37	—	—	—	—	—
2000–01	Hockey Club de Reims	France	15	10	12	22	—	8	2	5	7	—
2001–02	Hockey Club de Reims	France	—	7	24	31	—	—	—	—	—	—
2002–03	IF Sundsvall Hockey	Allsvenskan	23	6	6	12	28	—	—	—	—	—
2002–03	EV Duisburg	Germany2	19	6	5	11	18	—	—	—	—	—
2003–04	Gothiques d'Amiens	France	25	12	25	37	26	10	5	9	14	12
2004–05	Gothiques d'Amiens	France	28	7	28	35	26	5	0	4	4	4
2005–06	Gothiques d'Amiens	France	25	3	17	20	65	3	0	2	2	6
2006–07	Pingouins de Morzine-Avoriaz	France	26	12	21	33	46	12	7	9	16	22
2007–08	Pingouins de Morzine-Avoriaz	France	25	8	22	30	28	7	3	9	12	4
2008–09	Pingouins de Morzine-Avoriaz	France	26	14	21	35	38	6	1	3	4	18
2009–10	Dragons de Rouen	France	26	5	24	29	32	11	2	9	11	6
2010–11	Dragone de Rouen	France	26	5	18	23	28	9	2	4	6	8
France totals			388	136	293	429	477	71	22	54	76	80
