= Denis Perez =

French ice hockey player and coach

- Born: April 25, 1965 (age 60) Caen, France
- Height: 6 ft 2 in (188 cm)
- Weight: 203 lb (92 kg; 14 st 7 lb)
- Position: Defence
- Shot: Left
- Played for: Hockey Club de Caen; Français Volants; Dragons de Rouen; Adler Mannheim; Anglet Hormadi Élite; Gothiques d'Amiens
- National team: France
- Playing career: 1983–2005

Denis Perez (born 25 April 1965 in Caen, France), is a French ice hockey player and coach. He competed at five consecutive Olympics from 1988 to 2002, thus becoming the fifth hockey player to do so after Udo Kießling (Germany), Petter Thoresen (Norway), Raimo Helminen (Finland), and Dieter Hegen (Germany).

== Career ==
Perez played most of his career in the Ligue Magnus, the top division of professional ice hockey in France, with the exception of a year in Germany. He began his career at Hockey Club de Caen in 1983, where he stayed for a year before joining Français Volants for five seasons. He played for Dragons de Rouen from 1989 to 1997, Adler Mannheim from 1998 to 1999, Anglet Hormadi Élite from 1999 to 2001 and Gothiques d'Amiens from 2001 to 2005.

He is now the coach for Gothiques d'Amiens.

== Career statistics ==
=== Regular season and playoffs ===
			Regular season					Playoffs
Season	Team	League	GP	G	A	Pts	PIM	GP	G	A	Pts	PIM
1983–84	Hockey Club de Caen	FRA
1984–85	Français Volants	FRA
1985–86	Français Volants	FRA
1986–87	Français Volants	FRA
1987–88	Français Volants	FRA
1988–89	Français Volants	FRA	44	11	17	28	70	—	—	—	—	—
1989–90	Dragons de Rouen	FRA	40	5	12	17	54	—	—	—	—	—
1990–91	Dragons de Rouen	FRA	28	5	10	15	87	9	0	1	1	6
1991–92	Dragons de Rouen	FRA	28	1	7	8	44	—	—	—	—	—
1992–93	Dragons de Rouen	FRA	33	5	13	18	54	—	—	—	—	—
1993–94	Dragons de Rouen	FRA	20	3	18	21	14	11	3	15	18	10
1994–95	Dragons de Rouen	FRA	26	4	13	17	12	8	0	4	4	8
1995–96	Dragons de Rouen	FRA	28	2	11	13	18	9	0	4	4	8
1996–97	Dragons de Rouen	FRA	31	2	12	14	52	11	2	2	4	12
1997–98	Dragons de Rouen	FRA	49	9	16	25	118	—	—	—	—	—
1998–99	Adler Mannheim	DEL	35	2	1	3	30	6	2	1	3	0
1999–2000	Anglet Hormadi Élite	FRA	33	3	6	9	13	—	—	—	—	—
2000–01	Anglet Hormadi Élite	FRA		2	16	18
2001–02	HC Amiens Somme	FRA		2	6	8
2002–03	HC Amiens Somme	FRA	35	3	15	18	70	—	—	—	—	—
2003–04	HC Amiens Somme	FRA	21	6	8	14	32	10	4	3	7	20
2004–05	HC Amiens Somme	FRA	28	1	7	8	34	5	2	1	3	8
FRA totals			444	60	165	225	672	63	11	30	41	72

- FRA totals do not include stats from the 2000–01 and 2001–02 seasons.

=== International ===
Year	Team	Event	GP	G	A	Pts	PIM
1987	France	WC B	7	1	3	4	4
1988	France	OG	6	0	2	2	6
1989	France	WC B	7	0	3	3	6
1990	France	WC B	7	0	1	1	4
1991	France	WC B	4	1	0	1	6
1992	France	OG	8	0	1	1	4
1992	France	WC	6	0	0	0	6
1993	France	WC	6	0	1	1	4
1994	France	OG	7	0	1	1	4
1994	France	WC	5	0	1	1	2
1995	France	WC	6	0	0	0	4
1996	France	WC	7	0	1	1	8
1997	France	WC	8	0	0	0	2
1998	France	OG	4	0	0	0	0
1998	France	WC	3	0	0	0	2
1999	France	WC	3	1	0	1	6
1999	France	WC Q	3	0	1	1	0
2000	France	WC	6	0	2	2	8
2001	France	OGQ	3	0	1	1	2
2001	France	WC D1	5	1	0	1	4
2002	France	OG	4	0	0	0	4
Senior totals			115	4	18	22	86

== See also ==
- List of athletes with the most appearances at Olympic Games
