= Dave Reierson =

Canadian ice hockey player

- Born: August 30, 1964 (age 61) Bashaw, Alberta, Canada
- Height: 6 ft 0 in (183 cm)
- Weight: 185 lb (84 kg; 13 st 3 lb)
- Position: Defence
- Shot: Right
- Played for: Calgary Flames; HC Ambrì-Piotta; Tappara Tampere; EC Hannover; Augsburger Panther; Amiens
- National team: Canada
- NHL draft: 29th pick overall, 1982; Calgary Flames
- Playing career: 1986–1999

David Reierson (born August 30, 1964) is a Canadian former ice hockey defenceman. He played two games in the National Hockey League for the Calgary Flames during 1988–89 season. The rest of his career, which lasted from 1986 to 1997, was mainly spent in European leagues. Reierson was drafted by the Flames in the 2nd round (29th pick overall) of the 1982 NHL entry draft.

== Playing career ==
Reierson was born in Bashaw, Alberta. He played junior hockey with the Prince Albert Raiders of the Saskatchewan Junior Hockey League, helping to lead the Raiders to back-to-back SJHL titles, and Centennial Cup championships as Canadian Junior A champions in 1981 and 1982. He then played four seasons of college hockey with the Michigan Tech Huskies before turning pro in 1987. Reierson played two seasons in the Flames system before heading to Europe to finish his career. Reierson played for several teams in France, Finland, and Germany before retiring in 1999 after helping French club HC Amiens to the Ligue Magnus championship.

== Career statistics ==
=== Regular season and playoffs ===
			Regular season					Playoffs
Season	Team	League	GP	G	A	Pts	PIM	GP	G	A	Pts	PIM
1980–81	Prince Albert Raiders	SJHL	53	11	28	39	101	—	—	—	—	—
1981–82	Prince Albert Raiders	SJHL	60	20	51	71	163	27	3	25	28	42
1982–83	Michigan Tech	CCHA	38	2	14	16	58	—	—	—	—	—
1983–84	Michigan Tech	CCHA	38	4	15	19	63	—	—	—	—	—
1984–85	Michigan Tech	CCHA	36	5	27	32	76	—	—	—	—	—
1985–86	Michigan Tech	CCHA	39	7	16	23	51	—	—	—	—	—
1986–87	Canadian National Team	Intl	61	1	17	18	36	—	—	—	—	—
1986–87	Moncton Golden Flames	AHL	—	—	—	—	—	6	0	1	1	12
1987–88	Salt Lake Golden Eagles	IHL	48	10	20	30	42	16	2	14	16	30
1987–88	Canadian National Team	Intl	32	2	8	10	18	—	—	—	—	—
1988–89	Salt Lake Golden Eagles	IHL	76	7	46	53	70	13	1	8	9	12
1988–89	Calgary Flames	NHL	2	0	0	0	2	—	—	—	—	—
1989–90	HC Ambrì-Piotta	NLA	6	1	1	2	12	—	—	—	—	—
1989–90	Tappara	SM-l	32	7	5	12	28	7	0	2	2	12
1989–90	Canadian National Team	Intl	6	0	1	1	0	—	—	—	—	—
1990–91	Tappara	SM-l	41	1	8	9	18	3	0	0	0	2\
1990–91	Canadian National Team	Intl	8	0	1	1	6	—	—	—	—	—
1991–92	Gothiques d'Amiens	FRA	34	8	14	22	40	—	—	—	—	—
1992–93	Gothiques d'Amiens	FRA	14	12	12	24	18	—	—	—	—	—
1993–94	Gothiques d'Amiens	FRA	20	10	10	20	24	12	3	13	16	20
1994–95	EC Hannover	DEL	43	8	14	22	38	5	1	0	1	2
1995–96	EC Hannover	DEL	37	5	11	16	28	—	—	—	—	—
1995–96	Augsburger Panther	DEL	7	2	2	4	6	7	1	1	2	4
1996–97	Gothiques d'Amiens	FRA	31	5	15	20	30	10	2	0	2	8
1997–98	Gothiques d'Amiens	FRA	40	10	20	30	50	—	—	—	—	—
1998–99	Gothiques d'Amiens	FRA	48	10	13	23	61	—	—	—	—	—
FRA totals			187	55	84	139	223	22	5	13	18	28
NHL totals			2	0	0	0	2	—	—	—	—	—
