= Slavomir Vorobel =

Slovak ice hockey defenceman

- Born: October 26, 1971 (age 54) Košice, Czechoslovakia
- Height: 6 ft 3 in (191 cm)
- Weight: 207 lb (94 kg; 14 st 11 lb)
- Position: Defence
- Shot: Left
- Played for: HC Košice; HK Dukla Trenčín; Anglet Hormadi Élite; MHk 32 Liptovský Mikuláš; HK Poprad
- National team: Slovakia
- Playing career: 1993–2014

Slavomir Vorobel (born October 26, 1971) is a Slovak former ice hockey defenceman.

Vorobel played in the Tipsport Liga for HC Košice, HK Dukla Trenčín, MHk 32 Liptovský Mikuláš and HK Poprad. He also played in the French Ligue Magnus for Anglet Hormadi Élite.

Vorobel played in the 1996 World Ice Hockey Championships for Slovakia.

== Career statistics ==
| | | | Regular season | | | | | Playoffs |
| Season | Team | League | GP | G | A | Pts | PIM | GP | G | A | Pts | PIM |
|---|---|---|---|---|---|---|---|---|---|---|---|---|
| 1993–94 | HC Košice | Slovak | 3 | 2 | 1 | 3 | — | — | — | — | — | — |
| 1994–95 | HC Košice | Slovak | 21 | 3 | 5 | 8 | 12 | 9 | 3 | 3 | 6 | 4 |
| 1995–96 | HC Košice | Slovak | 35 | 1 | 7 | 8 | 42 | — | — | — | — | — |
| 1996–97 | HC Košice | Slovak | 47 | 6 | 9 | 15 | 40 | — | — | — | — | — |
| 1997–98 | HK Dukla Trenčín | Slovak | 39 | 5 | 5 | 10 | 16 | — | — | — | — | — |
| 1998–99 | HC Košice | Slovak | 48 | 7 | 11 | 18 | 61 | — | — | — | — | — |
| 1999–00 | Anglet Hormadi Élite | France | 32 | 11 | 13 | 24 | 30 | — | — | — | — | — |
| 2000–01 | Anglet Hormadi Élite | France | — | 8 | 9 | 17 | — | — | — | — | — | — |
| 2001–02 | HC Košice | Slovak | 54 | 11 | 18 | 29 | 62 | 10 | 2 | 2 | 4 | 35 |
| 2002–03 | HC Košice | Slovak | 54 | 4 | 9 | 13 | 40 | 13 | 0 | 3 | 3 | 10 |
| 2003–04 | HC Košice | Slovak | 54 | 4 | 10 | 14 | 32 | 8 | 1 | 1 | 2 | 4 |
| 2004–05 | HC Košice | Slovak | 27 | 0 | 0 | 0 | 14 | — | — | — | — | — |
| 2004–05 | Anglet Hormadi Élite | France | 5 | 0 | 1 | 1 | 20 | — | — | — | — | — |
| 2004–05 | MHk 32 Liptovský Mikuláš | Slovak | 9 | 1 | 1 | 2 | 16 | 5 | 1 | 0 | 1 | 2 |
| 2005–06 | HK SKP Poprad | Slovak | 53 | 2 | 4 | 6 | 79 | 15 | 0 | 0 | 0 | 22 |
| 2006–07 | HK SKP Poprad | Slovak | 12 | 0 | 1 | 1 | 8 | — | — | — | — | — |
| 2006–07 | Miskolci Jegesmedvék JSE | Hungary | 23 | 2 | 7 | 9 | — | — | — | — | — | — |
| 2007–08 | Miskolci Jegesmedvék JSE | Hungary | 35 | 7 | 6 | 13 | 76 | — | — | — | — | — |
| 2008–09 | Drakkars de Caen | France2 | 26 | 10 | 21 | 31 | 84 | 6 | 2 | 8 | 10 | 36 |
| 2009–10 | Drakkars de Caen | France2 | 26 | 5 | 14 | 19 | 76 | 7 | 0 | 1 | 1 | 6 |
| 2010–11 | Brest Albatros Hockey | France2 | 26 | 11 | 15 | 26 | 50 | 6 | 0 | 0 | 0 | 8 |
| 2011–12 | CG Puigcerdà | Spain | 5 | 0 | 3 | 3 | 20 | — | — | — | — | — |
| 2011–12 | HC Presov 07 | Slovak2 | 22 | 3 | 10 | 13 | 18 | 3 | 0 | 0 | 0 | 4 |
| 2012–13 | HK Michalovce | Slovak2 | 45 | 8 | 15 | 23 | 75 | 5 | 0 | 1 | 1 | 2 |
| 2013–14 | HK Michalovce | Slovak2 | 30 | 0 | 9 | 9 | 34 | — | — | — | — | — |
| Slovak totals | | | 456 | 46 | 81 | 127 | 422 | 60 | 7 | 9 | 16 | 77 |
