= David Dostal =

Czech-born French ice hockey right winger

- Born: August 27, 1973 (age 52) Opava, Czechoslovakia
- Height: 5 ft 11 in (180 cm)
- Weight: 183 lb (83 kg; 13 st 1 lb)
- Position: Right wing
- Shot: Left
- Played for: HC Slezan Opava; HK Spišská Nová Ves; Anglet Hormadi Élite; EfB Ishockey
- National team: France
- Playing career: 1992–2012; 2014–2016

David Dostal (born August 27, 1973) is a Czech-born French former professional ice hockey right winger.

Born in Opava, Czechoslovakia, Dostal began his career with his hometown HC Slezan Opava and played six games in the Czech Extraliga for the team during the 1996–97 season. He then spent a season with HK Spišská Nová Ves in Slovakia before joining French side Anglet Hormadi Élite in 1998. He spent seven seasons with Anglet, during which he became a French citizen and began playing for the French national team in 2003. He played for France in the 2004 World Ice Hockey Championship.

Dostal moved in Denmark in 2005, signing for EfB Ishockey. He remained for two seasons before returning to France in 2007, playing in the French lower leagues for the rest of his career.

== Career statistics ==
| | | | Regular season | | | | | Playoffs |
| Season | Team | League | GP | G | A | Pts | PIM | GP | G | A | Pts | PIM |
|---|---|---|---|---|---|---|---|---|---|---|---|---|
| 1992–93 | HC Slezan Opava | Czech2 | — | — | — | — | — | — | — | — | — | — |
| 1993–94 | HC Slezan Opava | Czech2 | — | — | — | — | — | — | — | — | — | — |
| 1995–96 | HC Slezan Opava | Czech Q | — | — | — | — | — | — | — | — | — | — |
| 1996–97 | HC Bohemex Trade Opava | Czech | 6 | 0 | 0 | 0 | 0 | — | — | — | — | — |
| 1997–98 | HK Spisska Nova Ves | Slovak | 32 | 4 | 6 | 10 | 14 | — | — | — | — | — |
| 1998–99 | Anglet Hormadi Élite | France | 40 | 26 | 16 | 42 | 28 | — | — | — | — | — |
| 1999–00 | Anglet Hormadi Élite | France | 32 | 15 | 25 | 40 | 36 | — | — | — | — | — |
| 2000–01 | Anglet Hormadi Élite | France | 39 | 10 | 23 | 33 | — | — | — | — | — | — |
| 2001–02 | Anglet Hormadi Élite | France | 36 | 15 | 22 | 37 | — | — | — | — | — | — |
| 2002–03 | Anglet Hormadi Élite | France | 26 | 17 | 20 | 37 | 32 | — | — | — | — | — |
| 2003–04 | Anglet Hormadi Élite | France | 25 | 7 | 14 | 21 | 22 | 9 | 1 | 3 | 4 | 6 |
| 2004–05 | Anglet Hormadi Élite | Ligue Magnus | 28 | 12 | 20 | 32 | 49 | 5 | 4 | 7 | 11 | 4 |
| 2005–06 | Esbjerg II | Denmark2 | 1 | 5 | 3 | 8 | 0 | — | — | — | — | — |
| 2005–06 | EfB Ishockey | Denmark | 33 | 9 | 10 | 19 | 20 | 5 | 0 | 0 | 0 | 14 |
| 2006–07 | EfB Ishockey | Denmark | 34 | 8 | 8 | 16 | 40 | 13 | 1 | 2 | 3 | 12 |
| 2007–08 | Taureaux de feu de Limoges | France4 | 13 | 14 | 55 | 69 | 40 | — | — | — | — | — |
| 2008–09 | Drakkars de Caen | France2 | 25 | 11 | 28 | 39 | 20 | 6 | 1 | 4 | 5 | 6 |
| 2009–10 | Drakkars de Caen | France2 | 21 | 8 | 10 | 18 | 12 | 7 | 1 | 2 | 3 | 18 |
| 2010–11 | Lions de Compiègne | France4 | 12 | 9 | 28 | 37 | 18 | 7 | 3 | 7 | 10 | 18 |
| 2011–12 | Lions de Compiègne | France3 | 18 | 4 | 18 | 22 | 14 | — | — | — | — | — |
| 2014–15 | Dragons de Rouen II | France4 | 6 | 6 | 11 | 17 | 4 | 3 | 1 | 1 | 2 | 4 |
| 2015–16 | Dragons de Rouen II | France4 | 4 | 1 | 3 | 4 | 6 | — | — | — | — | — |
| France totals | | | 226 | 102 | 140 | 242 | 167 | 14 | 5 | 10 | 15 | 10 |
