= Laurent Meunier =

French-Swiss ice hockey player

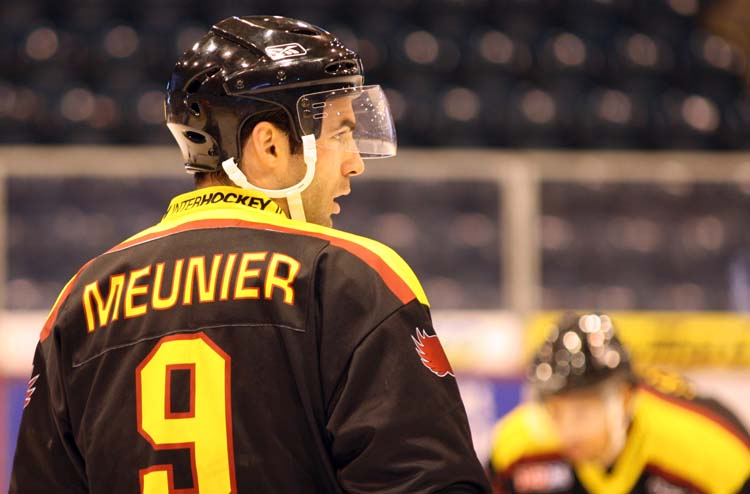
- Born: January 16, 1979 (age 47) Saint-Martin-d'Hères, France
- Height: 5 ft 11 in (180 cm)
- Weight: 185 lb (84 kg; 13 st 3 lb)
- Position: Centre
- Shot: Right
- Played for: Timrå IK; Genève-Servette HC; Straubing Tigers; HC La Chaux-de-Fonds; HC Fribourg-Gottéron
- National team: France
- Playing career: 1997–2019

Laurent Meunier (born January 16, 1979) is a French-Swiss former professional ice hockey player who spent most of his career in Switzerland playing in the National League (NL) and the Swiss League (SL). He also captained the French National team for 13 years, the longest serving captain of a national sporting team in the world.

Meunier currently co-hosts hockey TV show, Le Repas d'équipe, with fellow French-born Swiss former goaltender Cristobal Huet on MySports.

== Career ==
=== International retirement ===
In May 2017, Meunier played at the 2017 IIHF World Championship, in Paris, representing France, as lead team captain. This represented his swan song, and he retired from the national team after finishing the tournament. He played his last game at the final round robin game of France, against Slovenia, with a win, retiring with France's Lead Goaltender Cristobal Huet. Team France (Les Bleus) did not advance to the medal round, but was not relegated.

== Awards and honors ==
Award	Year
All-Hockey East Rookie Team	2000–01

== Career statistics ==
=== Regular season and playoffs ===
			Regular season					Playoffs
Season	Team	League	GP	G	A	Pts	PIM	GP	G	A	Pts	PIM
1996–97	Brûleurs de Loups	FRA	2	0	0	0	0	—	—	—	—	—
1997–98	LHC Les Lions	FRA	40	11	13	24	48	—	—	—	—	—
1998–99	LHC Les Lions	FRA	41	11	25	36	42	—	—	—	—	—
1999–2000	LHC Les Lions	FRA	32	16	14	30	42	—	—	—	—	—
2000–01	University of Massachusetts Lowell	HE	35	10	24	34	54	—	—	—	—	—
2001–02	University of Massachusetts Lowell	HE	27	9	15	24	34	—	—	—	—	—
2002–03	Florida Everblades	ECHL	68	20	31	51	106	1	1	1	2	0
2003–04	Brûleurs de Loups	FRA	26	11	16	27	36	—	—	—	—	—
2004–05	Brûleurs de Loups	FRA	27	16	18	34	79	12	1	4	5	12
2005–06	Brûleurs de Loups	FRA	26	11	17	28	36	7	2	6	8	10
2006–07	Genève–Servette HC	NLA	43	10	14	24	36	5	1	1	2	0
2007–08	Genève–Servette HC	NLA	20	10	8	18	24	15	6	7	13	16
2007–08	Lausanne HC	SUI.2	11	8	7	15	6	—	—	—	—	—
2008–09	HC Fribourg–Gottéron	NLA	38	8	10	18	58	8	1	2	3	4
2009–10	Timrå IK	SEL	47	4	13	17	46	5	1	1	2	4
2010–11	Genève–Servette HC	NLA	2	1	0	1	0	—	—	—	—	—
2010–11	HC La Chaux–de–Fonds	SUI.2	7	2	9	11	4	—	—	—	—	—
2010–11	Straubing Tigers	DEL	31	9	15	24	34	—	—	—	—	—
2011–12	Straubing Tigers	DEL	52	17	24	41	54	8	3	3	6	12
2012–13	Straubing Tigers	DEL	50	7	21	28	80	7	0	2	2	6
2013–14	Straubing Tigers	DEL	33	5	25	30	46	—	—	—	—	—
2014–15	Straubing Tigers	DEL	50	5	24	29	32	—	—	—	—	—
2015–16	HC La Chaux–de–Fonds	SUI.2	34	7	27	34	47	4	1	3	4	18
2015–16	Lausanne HC	NLA	1	0	0	0	2	—	—	—	—	—
2016–17	HC La Chaux–de–Fonds	SUI.2	40	15	27	42	26	10	3	7	10	20
2017–18	HC Fribourg–Gottéron	NL	50	4	7	11	40	5	0	2	2	4
2018–19	HC Fribourg–Gottéron	NL	40	0	5	5	16	—	—	—	—	—
2018–19	HC Ajoie	SUI.2	1	0	0	0	0	—	—	—	—	—
FRA totals			194	76	103	179	283	19	3	10	13	22
NLA/NL totals			194	33	44	77	176	33	8	12	20	24
DEL totals			216	43	109	152	246	15	3	5	8	18

=== International ===
Year	Team	Event	GP	G	A	Pts	PIM
1996	France	EJC B	5	4	4	8	6
1997	France	WJC B	7	0	1	1	6
1997	France	EJC B	6	4	4	8	8
1998	France	WJC B	6	6	0	6	12
1999	France	WJC B	5	2	5	7	4
1999	France	WC	3	0	0	0	0
1999	France	WC Q	3	0	0	0	2
2000	France	WC	6	4	3	7	2
2001	France	OGQ	3	0	0	0	4
2001	France	WC D1	5	0	3	3	2
2002	France	OG	4	0	1	1	6
2002	France	WC D1	5	3	2	5	2
2003	France	WC D1	5	1	4	5	12
2005	France	OGQ	6	3	4	7	4
2005	France	WC D1	5	0	3	3	6
2006	France	WC D1	5	3	1	4	2
2007	France	WC D1	5	3	5	8	8
2008	France	WC	3	0	0	0	0
2009	France	OGQ	2	0	0	0	2
2009	France	WC	4	0	3	3	14
2010	France	WC	5	2	1	3	4
2011	France	WC	6	2	1	3	8
2012	France	WC	7	1	6	7	22
2013	France	OGQ	3	2	1	3	4
2013	France	WC	5	0	2	2	4
2014	France	WC	8	2	1	3	16
2015	France	WC	7	1	2	3	0
2016	France	WC	7	0	1	1	10
2016	France	OGQ	3	0	2	2	0
2017	France	WC	7	0	2	2	8
Junior totals			29	16	14	30	40
Senior totals			122	27	48	75	142
