= Mojmír Božík =

Slovak ice hockey player

- Born: 26 February 1962 (age 64) Liptovský Mikuláš, Czechoslovakia
- Height: 5 ft 9 in (175 cm)
- Weight: 185 lb (84 kg; 13 st 3 lb)
- Position: Defense
- Shot: Right
- Played for: HC Kosice; HK Dukla Trencin; Jokerit; Kokkolan Hermes; Mora IK; Reims HC; HK Poprad; HK 32 Liptovsky Mikulas; Anglet Hormadi Elite
- National team: Czechoslovakia
- NHL draft: 231st overall, 1986; Edmonton Oilers
- Playing career: 1980–2002

Mojmír Božík (born 26 February 1962) is a Slovak former ice hockey player. He competed in the men's tournament at the 1988 Winter Olympics.

== Career statistics ==
=== Regular season and playoffs ===
			Regular season					Playoffs
Season	Team	League	GP	G	A	Pts	PIM	GP	G	A	Pts	PIM
1980–81	TJ VSŽ Košice	TCH	27	1	4	5	24	—	—	—	—	—
1981–82	TJ VSŽ Košice	TCH	43	2	7	9	—	—	—	—	—	—
1982–83	ASVŠ Dukla Trenčín	SVK.2	—	9	—	—	—	—	—	—	—	—
1983–84	ASVŠ Dukla Trenčín	TCH	41	1	5	6	40	—	—	—	—	—
1984–85	TJ VSŽ Košice	TCH	41	2	10	12	32	—	—	—	—	—
1985–86	TJ VSŽ Košice	TCH	—	—	—	—	—	—	—	—	—	—
1986–87	TJ VSŽ Košice	TCH	33	7	8	15	40	7	0	1	1	—
1987–88	TJ VSŽ Košice	TCH	44	5	11	16	—	—	—	—	—	—
1988–89	TJ VSŽ Košice	TCH	32	8	6	14	56	11	1	2	3	—
1989–90	TJ VSŽ Košice	TCH	49	9	14	23	—	—	—	—	—	—
1990–91	Jokerit	SM-l	44	2	11	13	54	—	—	—	—	—
1991–92	Jokerit	SM-l	34	3	9	12	30	—	—	—	—	—
1992–93	Hermes	FIN.3	12	1	9	10	0	—	—	—	—	—
1992–93	Hermes	FIN.2	12	2	5	7	22	—	—	—	—	—
1993–94	Mora IK	SWE.2	32	4	12	16	46	5	0	1	1	10
1994–95	Hockey Club de Reims	FRA	28	3	12	15	32	7	0	1	1	14
1995–96	Hockey Club de Reims	FRA	26	1	2	3	34	10	0	4	4	32
1996–97	HC ŠKP PS Poprad	SVK	47	3	12	15	60	—	—	—	—	—
1997–98	HK 32 Liptovský Mikuláš	SVK	6	0	0	0	4	—	—	—	—	—
1997–98	Anglet Hormadi Élite	FRA	34	5	9	14	91	—	—	—	—	—
1998–99	Anglet Hormadi Élite	FRA	37	4	6	10	53	—	—	—	—	—
1999–2000	HC VSŽ Košice	SVK	20	0	5	5	10	—	—	—	—	—
2001–02	HC Košice	SVK	1	0	0	0	0	—	—	—	—	—
TCH totals			310	35	65	100	192	18	1	3	4	—
SM-l totals			78	5	20	25	84	—	—	—	—	—
FRA totals			125	13	29	42	210	17	0	5	5	46

=== International ===
Year	Team	Event	GP	G	A	Pts	PIM
1980	Czechoslovakia	EJC	5	1	2	3	6
1981	Czechoslovakia	WJC	4	0	2	2	2
1982	Czechoslovakia	WJC	7	0	2	2	16
1986	Czechoslovakia	WC	10	1	1	2	4
1987	Czechoslovakia	WC	7	0	1	1	8
1987	Czechoslovakia	CC	6	0	1	1	4
1988	Czechoslovakia	OG	8	1	3	4	2
1990	Czechoslovakia	WC	8	0	1	1	4
Junior totals			16	1	6	7	24
Senior totals			39	2	7	9	22
