= Michel Galarneau =

Canadian-born French ice hockey player

- Born: March 1, 1961 (age 65) Montreal, Quebec, Canada
- Height: 6 ft 2 in (188 cm)
- Weight: 180 lb (82 kg; 12 st 12 lb)
- Position: Centre
- Shot: Right
- Played for: Hartford Whalers
- National team: France
- NHL draft: 29th overall, 1980; Hartford Whalers
- Playing career: 1981–2000

Michel Galarneau (born March 1, 1961) is a Canadian-born French former ice hockey centre. He played 78 games in the National Hockey League with the Hartford Whalers between 1980 and 1983, while mainly playing in the minor leagues. He moved to Europe in 1984, spending one season in the Dutch Eredivisie, and then moved to the French domestic league in 1985, where he played until retiring in 2000. Internationally Galarneau represented the French national team at the 1995 World Championships.

== Biography ==
Galarneau was born in Montreal, Quebec. As a youth, he played in the 1973 and 1974 Quebec International Pee-Wee Hockey Tournaments with a minor ice hockey team from Rosemont, Montreal. He played junior hockey in the Quebec Major Junior Hockey League for the Hull Olympiques where in his second season in 1979–80, he scored 39 goals and 64 assists for 103 points. He was drafted in the second round as a result of his highly productive performance, selected 29th overall by the Hartford Whalers in the 1980 NHL entry draft. He was unable to repeat his performances as a pro however, receiving limited ice-time during his spell with the Whalers, splitting his ice-time with the American Hockey League's Binghamton Whalers. In his three seasons with the Whalers, Galarneau played 78 regular season games, scoring 7 goals and 10 assists for 17 points.

Galarneau spent one season in the Central Hockey League for the Montana Magic as well as brief spells in the AHL for the Binghamton Whalers and the Fredericton Express before moving to the Netherlands for one season with Eindhoven Kemphanen. In 1985, Galaneau moved to France's Ligue Magnus and signed for HC Amiens. After six seasons, he moved to HC Briançon for one season before moving to Division 1 team Anglet for one season. In 1993, he moved to Brest where he won two French Championships in 1996 and 1997. He remained with the team until his retirement in 2000.

Galarneau spent a total of 16 seasons in France. Though a Canadian, he obtained French citizenship during his lengthy spell in the country and represented his adopted country in the 1995 World Championships.

== Career statistics ==
=== Regular season and playoffs ===
			Regular season					Playoffs
Season	Team	League	GP	G	A	Pts	PIM	GP	G	A	Pts	PIM
1976–77	Rosemount Selects	QAHA	—	—	—	—	—	—	—	—	—	—
1977–78	Hull Olympiques	QMJHL	3	1	0	1	0	4	0	0	0	0
1978–79	Hull Olympiques	QMJHL	67	22	37	59	70	—	—	—	—	—
1979–80	Hull Olympiques	QMJHL	72	39	64	103	49	4	3	1	4	12
1980–81	Hull Olympiques	QMJHL	30	9	21	30	48	—	—	—	—	—
1980–81	Hartford Whalers	NHL	30	2	6	8	9	—	—	—	—	—
1980–81	Binghamton Whalers	AHL	9	1	0	1	4	5	0	1	1	0
1981–82	Hartford Whalers	NHL	10	0	0	0	4	—	—	—	—	—
1981–82	Binghamton Whalers	AHL	64	15	17	32	52	14	2	0	2	2
1982–83	Hartford Whalers	NHL	38	5	4	9	21	—	—	—	—	—
1982–83	Binghamton Whalers	AHL	25	4	6	10	20	—	—	—	—	—
1983–84	Montana Magic	CHL	66	18	22	40	44	—	—	—	—	—
1983–84	Binghamton Whalers	AHL	4	1	0	1	0	—	—	—	—	—
1983–84	Fredericton Express	AHL	2	0	0	0	0	—	—	—	—	—
1984–85	Eindhoven Kemphanen	NED	—	—	—	—	—	—	—	—	—	—
1985–86	HC Amiens	FRA	—	—	—	—	—	—	—	—	—	—
1986–87	HC Amiens	FRA	36	51	33	84	28	—	—	—	—	—
1987–88	HC Amiens	FRA	30	28	22	50	36	—	—	—	—	—
1988–89	HC Amiens	FRA	3	2	1	3	2	—	—	—	—	—
1989–90	HC Amiens	FRA	12	11	7	18	13	3	2	1	3	2
1990–91	HC Amiens	FRA	32	25	24	49	50	4	4	1	5	14
1991–92	Diables Rouges de Briançon	FRA	32	25	24	49	50	—	—	—	—	—
1992–93	Anglet Hormadi Élite	FRA-2	26	22	23	45	26	—	—	—	—	—
1993–94	Brest Albatros Hockey	FRA	20	14	15	29	45	6	7	5	12	6
1994–95	Brest Albatros Hockey	FRA	27	14	19	33	54	9	4	2	6	2
1995–96	Brest Albatros Hockey	FRA	27	9	12	21	38	10	0	5	5	37
1996–97	Brest Albatros Hockey	FRA	30	14	11	25	55	10	2	5	7	14
1997–98	Brest Albatros Hockey	FRA-4	—	—	—	—	—	—	—	—	—	—
1998–99	Brest Albatros Hockey	FRA-3	28	31	27	58	—	—	—	—	—	—
1999–00	Brest Albatros Hockey	FRA-2	29	13	16	29	—	—	—	—	—	—
FRA totals			249	193	168	361	371	42	19	19	38	75
NHL totals			78	7	10	17	34	—	—	—	—	—

=== International ===
Year	Team	Event	GP	G	A	Pts	PIM
1995	France	WC	6	1	1	2	2
Senior totals			56	1	1	2	2
