= Pascal Margerit =

French ice hockey player

- Born: February 21, 1971 (age 54) Thonon-les-Bains, France
- Height: 5 ft 9 in (175 cm)
- Weight: 170 lb (77 kg; 12 st 2 lb)
- Position: Forward
- Shot: Left
- Played for: Pionniers de Chamonix-Mont Blanc; Diables Rouges de Briançon; Pingouins de Morzine-Avoriaz; Nice hockey Côte d'Azur; Drakkars de Caen; Ours de Villard-de-Lans
- NHL draft: Undrafted
- Playing career: 1988–2008

Pascal Margerit (born 12 February 1971) is a French ice hockey player. He competed in the men's tournament at the 1992 Winter Olympics.

== Career statistics ==
			Regular season					Playoffs
Season	Team	League	GP	G	A	Pts	PIM	GP	G	A	Pts	PIM
1988–89	Pionniers de Chamonix-Mont Blanc	France2	9	10	5	15	6	—	—	—	—	—
1989–90	Pionniers de Chamonix-Mont Blanc	France2	28	30	24	54	22	—	—	—	—	—
1990–91	Diables Rouges de Briançon	France	23	4	6	10	12	—	—	—	—	—
1991–92	Diables Rouges de Briançon	France	31	11	17	28	15	—	—	—	—	—
1992–93	Pingouins de Morzine-Avoriaz	France2	25	16	14	30	20	—	—	—	—	—
1993–94	Pionniers de Chamonix-Mont Blanc	France	20	10	8	18	8	—	—	—	—	—
1994–95	Pionniers de Chamonix-Mont Blanc	France	21	7	6	13	10	—	—	—	—	—
1995–96	Pionniers de Chamonix-Mont Blanc	France	26	5	8	13	16	—	—	—	—	—
1996–97	Nice hockey Côte d'Azur	France2	28	22	15	37	58	—	—	—	—	—
1997–98	Drakkars de Caen	France2	25	24	11	35	56	—	—	—	—	—
1998–99	Drakkars de Caen	France	42	15	24	39	46	—	—	—	—	—
1999–00	Drakkars de Caen	France	34	5	7	12	13	—	—	—	—	—
2000–01	Ours de Villard-de-Lans	France2	26	9	16	25	28	4	2	2	4	2
2001–02	Nice hockey Côte d'Azur	France3	—	—	—	—	—	—	—	—	—	—
2002–03	Nice hockey Côte d'Azur	France2	—	12	17	29	—	—	—	—	—	—
2003–04	Nice hockey Côte d'Azur	France4	10	25	30	55	18	—	—	—	—	—
2004–05	Nice hockey Côte d'Azur	France3	19	20	24	44	38	—	—	—	—	—
2005–06	Nice hockey Côte d'Azur	France3	23	14	22	36	28	2	1	2	3	0
2006–07	Nice hockey Côte d'Azur	France3	21	12	16	28	28	—	—	—	—	—
2007–08	Nice hockey Côte d'Azur	France3	14	7	18	25	18	8	8	8	16	26
France totals			197	57	76	133	120	—	—	—	—	—
