= Vesa Lahtinen =

Finnish ice hockey defenceman

- Born: July 30, 1968 (age 56); Rauma, Finland
- Height: 6 ft 1 in (185 cm)
- Weight: 203 lb (92 kg; 14 st 7 lb)
- Position: Defence
- Shot: Left
- Played for: Lukko; Hellerup IK; Anglet Hormadi Élite
- Playing career: 1988–2002

Vesa Lahtinen (born September 16, 1968) is a Finnish former professional ice hockey defenceman.

Lahtinen played 110 games in the SM-liiga for Lukko, based in his hometown of Rauma, from 1988 to 1991. He also played in the 1. Divisioona for KooKoo, Kokkolan Hermes and Pelicans as well as in Denmark's Eliteserien for Hellerup IK and France's Élite Ligue for Anglet Hormadi Élite.

== Career statistics ==
			Regular season					Playoffs
Season	Team	League	GP	G	A	Pts	PIM	GP	G	A	Pts	PIM
1988–89	Lukko	SM-liiga	38	1	1	2	6	—	—	—	—	—
1989–90	Lukko	SM-liiga	30	1	2	3	4	—	—	—	—	—
1990–91	Lukko	SM-liiga	42	2	5	7	12	—	—	—	—	—
1991–92	KooKoo	I-Divisioona	41	0	7	7	14	—	—	—	—	—
1992–93	KooKoo	I-Divisioona	42	0	9	9	20	5	0	0	0	0
1993–94	KaPa-65	II-divisioona	28	9	17	26	34	—	—	—	—	—
1994–95	Hellerup IK	Denmark	39	12	5	17	28	—	—	—	—	—
1995–96	Kokkolan Hermes	I-Divisioona	43	0	9	9	42	—	—	—	—	—
1996–97	Kokkolan Hermes	I-Divisioona	43	2	9	11	55	—	—	—	—	—
1997–98	Kokkolan Hermes	I-Divisioona	14	0	2	2	18	—	—	—	—	—
1997–98	Nivala Cowboys	II-divisioona	—	—	—	—	—	—	—	—	—	—
1997–98	Lahti Pelicans	I-Divisioona	24	2	3	5	18	—	—	—	—	—
1998–99	Anglet Hormadi Élite	France	30	0	10	10	12	—	—	—	—	—
1999–00	Anglet Hormadi Élite	France	32	5	10	15	25	—	—	—	—	—
2000–01	Anglet Hormadi Élite	France	—	2	8	10	—	—	—	—	—	—
2001–02	Anglet Hormadi Élite	France	—	3	7	10	—	—	—	—	—	—
SM-liiga totals			110	4	8	12	22	—	—	—	—	—
I-Divisioona totals			207	4	39	43	167	5	0	0	0	0
