= Daniel Kysela =

Czech ice hockey defenceman

- Born: December 19, 1970 (age 55) Ostrava, Czechoslovakia
- Height: 5 ft 10 in (178 cm)
- Weight: 190 lb (86 kg; 13 st 8 lb)
- Position: Defence
- Shot: Left
- Played for: HC Vítkovice; HC Olomouc; Lions de Lyon; HC Havířov; Brest Albatros Hockey
- Playing career: 1988–2004

Daniel Kysela (born December 19, 1970) is a Czech former professional ice hockey defenceman.

Kysela spent the majority of his career with HC Vítkovice of the Czech Extraliga. He played with the team from 1988 to 1997 and again briefly during the 1999–2000 season. Kysela also had spells for HC Olomouc and HC Havířov as well as in France for Lions de Lyon and Brest Albatros Hockey.

== Career statistics ==
			Regular season					Playoffs
Season	Team	League	GP	G	A	Pts	PIM	GP	G	A	Pts	PIM
1988–89	TJ Vitkovice	Czechoslovakia	—	—	—	—	—	—	—	—	—	—
1989–90	TJ Vitkovice	Czechoslovakia	7	0	0	0	—	—	—	—	—	—
1990–91	TJ Vitkovice	Czechoslovakia	14	0	1	1	4	—	—	—	—	—
1991–92	TJ Vitkovice	Czechoslovakia	33	3	2	5	—	9	0	0	0	—
1992–93	TJ Vitkovice	Czechoslovakia	39	3	4	7	—	—	—	—	—	—
1993–94	HC Vítkovice	Czech	35	3	6	9	44	5	1	0	1	8
1994–95	HC Vítkovice	Czech	34	5	10	15	66	—	—	—	—	—
1994–95	HC Havířov	Czech2	—	—	—	—	—	—	—	—	—	—
1995–96	HC Vítkovice	Czech	24	1	1	2	57	—	—	—	—	—
1995–96	HC Olomouc	Czech	1	0	0	0	2	—	—	—	—	—
1996–97	HC Vítkovice	Czech	37	3	6	9	18	5	0	0	0	6
1997–98	LHC Les Lions	France	50	10	21	31	86	—	—	—	—	—
1998–99	LHC Les Lions	France	40	3	18	21	69	—	—	—	—	—
1999–00	HC Vítkovice	Czech	3	0	3	3	0	—	—	—	—	—
1999–00	Brest Albatros Hockey	France2	29	8	22	30	—	—	—	—	—	—
2000–01	Brest Albatros Hockey	France3	23	31	43	74	—	—	—	—	—	—
2001–02	HC Havířov Panthers	Czech	49	4	11	15	72	—	—	—	—	—
2002–03	Brest Albatros Hockey	France	26	2	16	18	83	—	—	—	—	—
2003–04	Brest Albatros Hockey	France	7	1	4	5	10	8	1	1	2	8
Czech totals			183	16	37	53	259	10	1	0	1	14
France totals			123	16	59	75	248	8	1	1	2	8
