= Marko Lapinkoski =

Finnish ice hockey forward

- Born: October 2, 1969 (age 55); Oulu, Finland
- Height: 5 ft 9 in (175 cm)
- Weight: 187 lb (85 kg; 13 st 5 lb)
- Position: Forward
- Shot: Right
- Played for: Oulun Kärpät; Tappara; Anglet Hormadi Élite
- Playing career: 1988–2011

Marko Lapinkoski (born October 2, 1969) is a Finnish former professional ice hockey forward.

Lapinkoski played 114 regular season games in the SM-liiga for Oulun Kärpät and Tappara. He also had a two season stint in France for Anglet Hormadi Élite.

Lapinkoski played in the World Junior Ice Hockey Championships with Finland in 1988, where he won a bronze medal, and 1989.

== Career statistics ==
			Regular season					Playoffs
Season	Team	League	GP	G	A	Pts	PIM	GP	G	A	Pts	PIM
1986–87	Oulun Kärpät U20	Jr. A SM-sarja	33	25	17	42	6	4	2	2	4	0
1987–88	Oulun Kärpät U20	Jr. A SM-sarja	33	37	20	57	4	4	4	0	4	2
1987–88	Oulun Kärpät	SM-liiga	10	0	0	0	2	—	—	—	—	—
1988–89	Oulun Kärpät U20	Jr. A SM-sarja	2	4	1	5	0	—	—	—	—	—
1988–89	Oulun Kärpät	SM-liiga	37	15	10	25	2	—	—	—	—	—
1989–90	Oulun Kärpät	I-Divisioona	44	44	35	79	6	—	—	—	—	—
1990–91	Oulun Kärpät	I-Divisioona	43	24	44	68	16	—	—	—	—	—
1991–92	Tappara	SM-liiga	20	0	6	6	4	—	—	—	—	—
1992–93	Tappara	SM-liiga	47	5	6	11	4	—	—	—	—	—
1993–94	Oulun Kärpät	I-Divisioona	46	34	25	59	12	—	—	—	—	—
1994–95	Kokkolan Hermes	I-Divisioona	46	18	34	52	14	3	1	1	2	0
1995–96	Kokkolan Hermes	I-Divisioona	38	17	23	40	6	11	4	2	6	4
1996–97	Kokkolan Hermes	I-Divisioona	42	26	29	55	30	3	0	1	1	0
1997–98	Kokkolan Hermes	I-Divisioona	43	15	14	29	6	8	0	7	7	2
1998–99	Kokkolan Hermes	I-Divisioona	46	6	20	26	6	—	—	—	—	—
1999–00	Anglet Hormadi Élite	France	30	14	13	27	28	—	—	—	—	—
2000–01	Anglet Hormadi Élite	France	—	14	19	33	—	—	—	—	—	—
2002–03	Jeppis	Suomi-sarja	28	22	26	48	8	—	—	—	—	—
2003–04	Jeppis	Suomi-sarja	31	28	28	56	16	4	2	2	4	2
2004–05	Jeppis	Suomi-sarja	21	19	20	39	39	—	—	—	—	—
2005–06	Jeppis	2. Divisioona	25	24	20	44	8	—	—	—	—	—
2006–07	Jeppis	Suomi-sarja	35	20	31	51	12	—	—	—	—	—
2007–08	Jeppis	Suomi-sarja	18	10	12	22	12	—	—	—	—	—
2007–08	Kiekko-Laser	Suomi-sarja	11	5	12	17	10	—	—	—	—	—
2008–09	Jeppis	Suomi-sarja	10	5	6	11	6	—	—	—	—	—
2009–10	Kokkolan Hermes	2. Divisioona	12	9	14	23	2	—	—	—	—	—
2009–10	Muik Hockey	2. Divisioona	9	13	19	32	10	—	—	—	—	—
2010–11	Muik Hockey	2. Divisioona	2	0	5	5	2	—	—	—	—	—
SM-liiga totals			114	20	22	42	12	—	—	—	—	—
I-Divisioona totals			348	184	224	408	96	25	5	11	16	6
Suomi-sarja totals			154	109	135	244	103	4	2	2	4	2
