= Cristobal Huet =

French ice hockey player (born 1975)

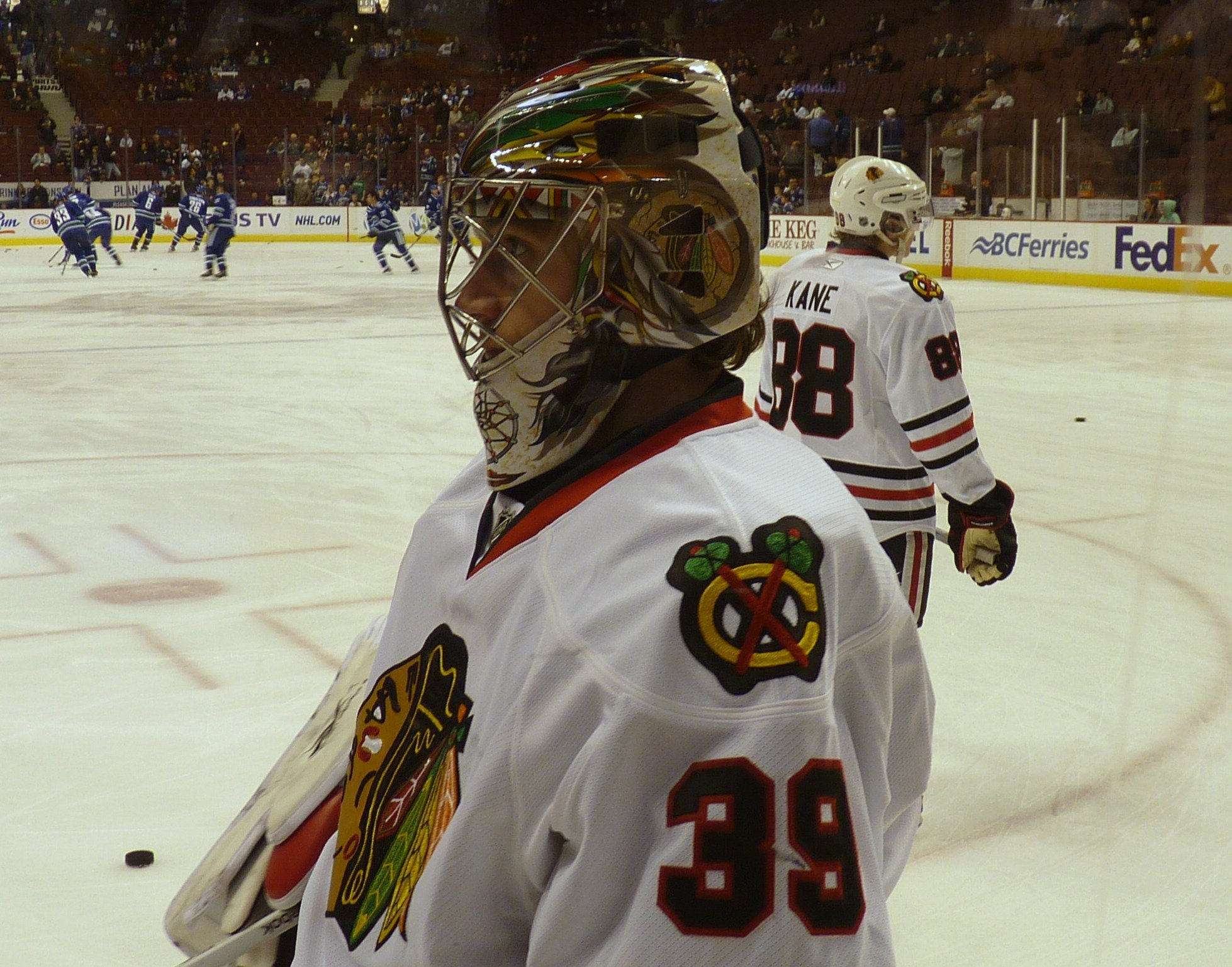
- Huet with the Chicago Blackhawks in November 2009
- Born: September 3, 1975 (age 50) Saint-Martin-d'Hères, France
- Height: 6 ft 0 in (183 cm)
- Weight: 205 lb (93 kg; 14 st 9 lb)
- Position: Goaltender
- Caught: Left
- Played for: Brûleurs de Loups; HC Lugano; Los Angeles Kings; Adler Mannheim; Montreal Canadiens; Washington Capitals; Chicago Blackhawks; HC Fribourg-Gottéron; Lausanne HC
- National team: France
- NHL draft: 214th overall, 2001; Los Angeles Kings
- Playing career: 1994–2018

Cristobal Huet (French pronunciation: [kʁistɔbal ɥɛ]; born September 3, 1975) is a French former professional ice hockey goaltender who is a goaltender coach for Lausanne HC of the National League (NL). He previously played for HC Lugano and HC Fribourg-Gottéron and within the Chicago Blackhawks, Los Angeles Kings, Montreal Canadiens, and Washington Capitals organizations in the National Hockey League (NHL). He is the first French netminder and second French-trained player overall (after Philippe Bozon) to play in the NHL. He currently co-hosts hockey TV show, Le Repas d'équipe, with fellow French-born Swiss former player Laurent Meunier on MySports.

Huet won the Stanley Cup with the Chicago Blackhawks in 2010, and became the first Frenchman to win the Stanley Cup as a player. He was inducted into the IIHF Hall of Fame in 2023.

== Playing career ==
=== Amateur ===
As a youth, Huet played in the 1988 Quebec International Pee-Wee Hockey Tournament with a team from Grenoble.

=== HC Lugano ===
Huet played for HC Lugano from the 1998–99 season to 2001–02. His career took a significant turn in these years. He won the National League A Championship in his first year, and reached the European Hockey League final four the next year.

=== Los Angeles Kings (2002–2005) ===
Huet was drafted by the Los Angeles Kings as their seventh-round pick, 214th overall, in the 2001 NHL entry draft. He played for the Kings in the 2002–2003 and 2003–2004 seasons. He was traded to the Montreal Canadiens in a three-team deal that sent Mathieu Garon to Los Angeles and Radek Bonk from Ottawa to Montreal. During the 2004–05 lockout Huet played for the Adler Mannheim in the Deutsche Eishockey Liga. He led the team to the finals, where the Eagles lost in three straight games to Eisbären Berlin.

=== Montreal Canadiens (2005–2008) ===
During the 2005–06 season, Huet eventually won the starting job in goal for the Canadiens at the expense of José Théodore, who was subsequently traded to Colorado in exchange for goaltender David Aebischer. He also won the Molson Cup in February 2006. He won the Best Defensive Player award from the NHL during the first week of March, ousting goaltenders such as the Ottawa Senators' Ray Emery and the New Jersey Devils' Martin Brodeur, with a 3–0–0 record and a 1.67 GAA. For the second time of the year, he was named NHL Best Defensive Player on April 3 with a 3–0–0 record, a 0.65 GAA and 0.979 SV%, ousting goaltenders Martin Brodeur, Calgary's Miikka Kiprusoff and Detroit's Manny Legace.

On April 23, in his first NHL playoff start, Huet starred in a 6–1 win against the 2nd seeded and eventual Stanley Cup champion Carolina Hurricanes. Huet stopped 42 of 43 shots in the contest to put the Canadiens up 1–0 in the seven-game series. Two days later, Huet recorded his first overtime playoff win, when the Canadiens beat the Hurricanes 6–5 in double overtime to take the lead 2–0 in the series. However, Huet and the Canadiens lost the next four games and the series in goaltender duels with rookie Cam Ward, who had taken Martin Gerber's starting spot in the series, and who would later go on to win the Conn Smythe Trophy.

The Canadiens re-signed Huet in the 2006 off-season to a two-year deal at $5.75 million total, earning $3 million the first season and $2.75 million in the second year.

On January 13, 2007, Huet was announced as one of the three goaltenders of the Eastern Conference All-Star Team in the 55th NHL All-Star Game in Dallas. A month later, however, he suffered a left hamstring injury that caused him to miss most of the final two months of the season. In his absence, the Canadiens struggled, and the team missed the postseason.

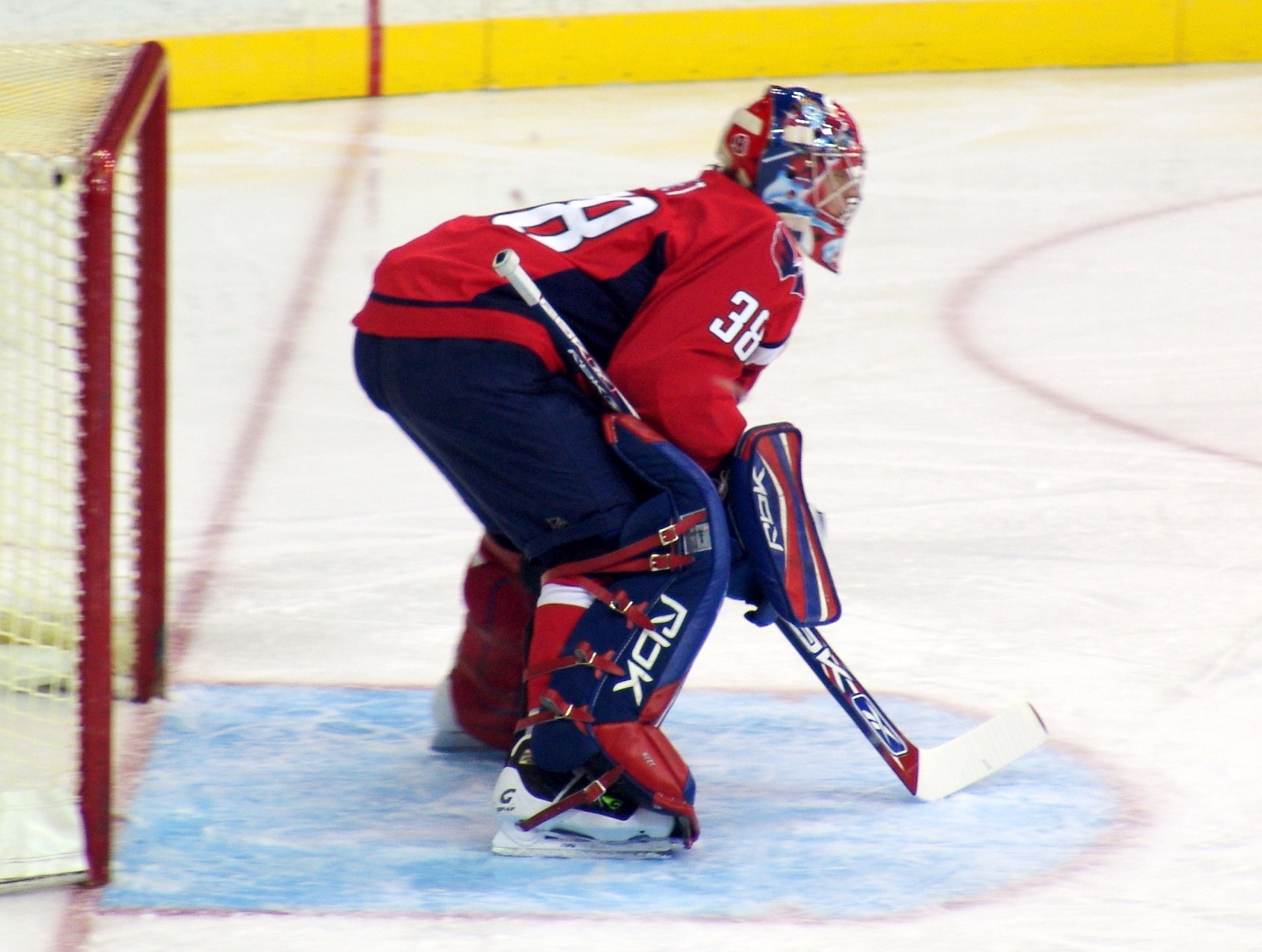
Huet with the Washington Capitals in March 2008

=== Washington Capitals (2008) ===
On February 26, 2008, Montreal Canadiens general manager Bob Gainey traded the French netminder to the Washington Capitals for a 2009 second-round draft pick. The Canadiens decided to trade Huet because of highly touted prospect, Carey Price. In Washington, he took over the starting position from Olaf Kölzig, pushing incumbent backup Brent Johnson to the pressbox, and his exceptional play helped lead Washington to secure a playoff berth, where they lost the opening round series against the Philadelphia Flyers in seven games.

=== Chicago Blackhawks (2008–2010) ===
On July 1, 2008, the first day of unrestricted free-agency, Huet agreed to terms on a new 4-year contract with the Chicago Blackhawks worth a total of $22.4 million or $5.625 million per season.

Following the signing, Blackhawks general manager Dale Tallon announced the team would enter the season with a tandem of Huet and Nikolai Khabibulin. Unable to win the starting job over Khabibulin to start the season, Huet found himself on the bench more often than not. Gradually, he earned back his playing time and both alternated every game for almost 3 months until Khabibulin went down with a groin injury in early February. The tandem, however, earned praise around the NHL. A second Khabibulin injury in early February thrust Huet in the spotlight once again, and he was named the NHL's 3rd star of the week for Feb 15–21, posting a 3–0–0 record and allowing just five goals on 72 shots. In the end however, Khabibulin was named the playoff starter for the Blackhawks, and they defeated the Calgary Flames in the first round as well as the Vancouver Canucks in the second round.

Huet made his next appearance for the Blackhawks during game three of the 2009 Western Conference Finals, where he was called to replace an injured Khabibulin. He made six saves, and allowed the Blackhawks to collect an overtime win. With Khabibulin still recovering from a lower body injury, Joel Quenneville named Huet the team's starting goaltender for the fourth game against Detroit. Huet allowed five goals on 21 shots, and was temporarily replaced by Corey Crawford. During the final game of the series, Huet stopped 44 shots en route to a 2–1 overtime loss.

For the first time in his career, Huet started a season as the undisputed number one goaltender, but as the 2009–10 campaign wore on, Antti Niemi eventually replaced Huet as Chicago's starter going into the playoffs. Huet played only twenty minutes in the 2010 Stanley Cup Playoffs, which the Blackhawks won with Niemi in net and with an overall playoff record of 16–6. With the Hawks victory, Huet became the first native of France to get his name engraved on the Stanley Cup.

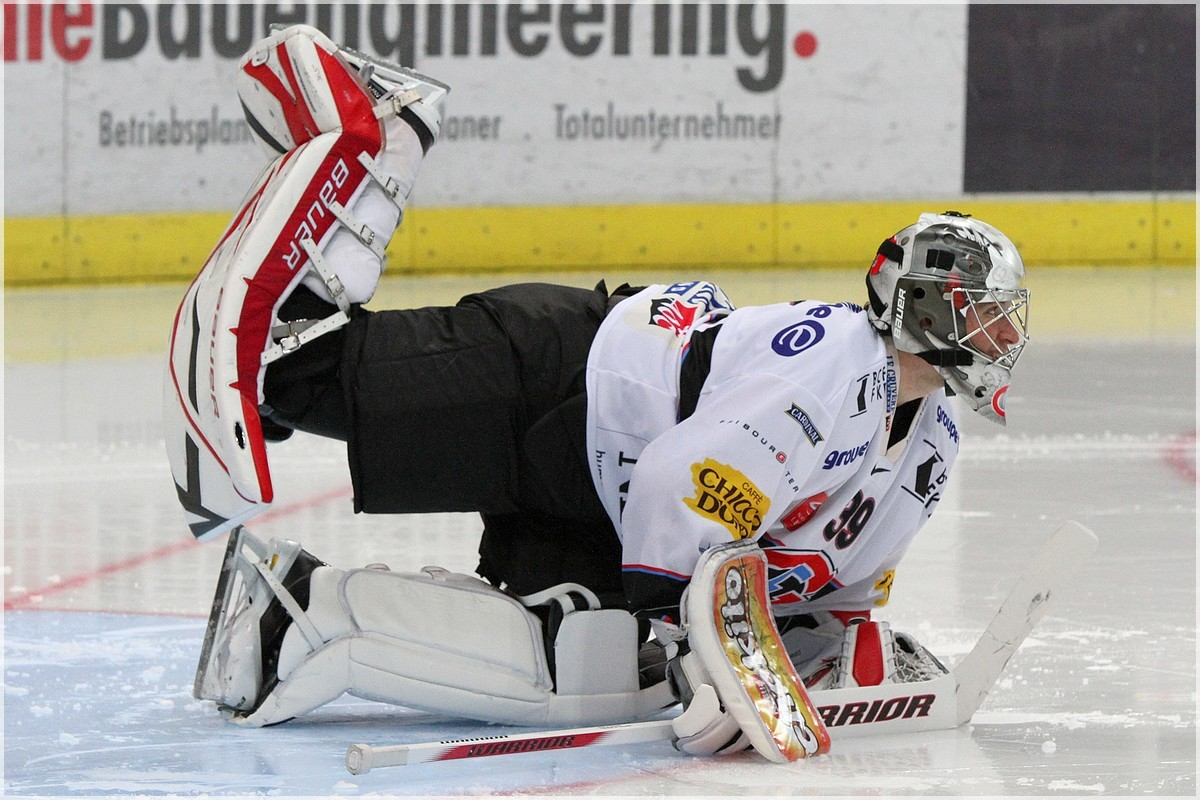
Huet with Fribourg-Gottéron in November 2010

=== Fribourg-Gotteron (2010–2012) ===
On September 27, 2010, Chicago loaned Huet to HC Fribourg-Gotteron of the Swiss National League A in order to stay within the salary cap. In his first year with Fribourg-Gotteron, Huet played in 41 games but struggled in the second half of the season, accumulating a 2.84 goals against average as the team finished 8th. Fribourg qualified for the playoffs only to be swept by HC Davos. The following season he improved to a goals against average of 1.99 in 39 games, third best in the league that year. The team defeated HC Lugano in the quarterfinals in 6 games but lost to SC Bern in the semifinals in 5 games. Huet's loan and his contract with the Blackhawks expired when the playoffs ended, thus making him a free agent.

=== Lausanne HC (2012–2018) ===
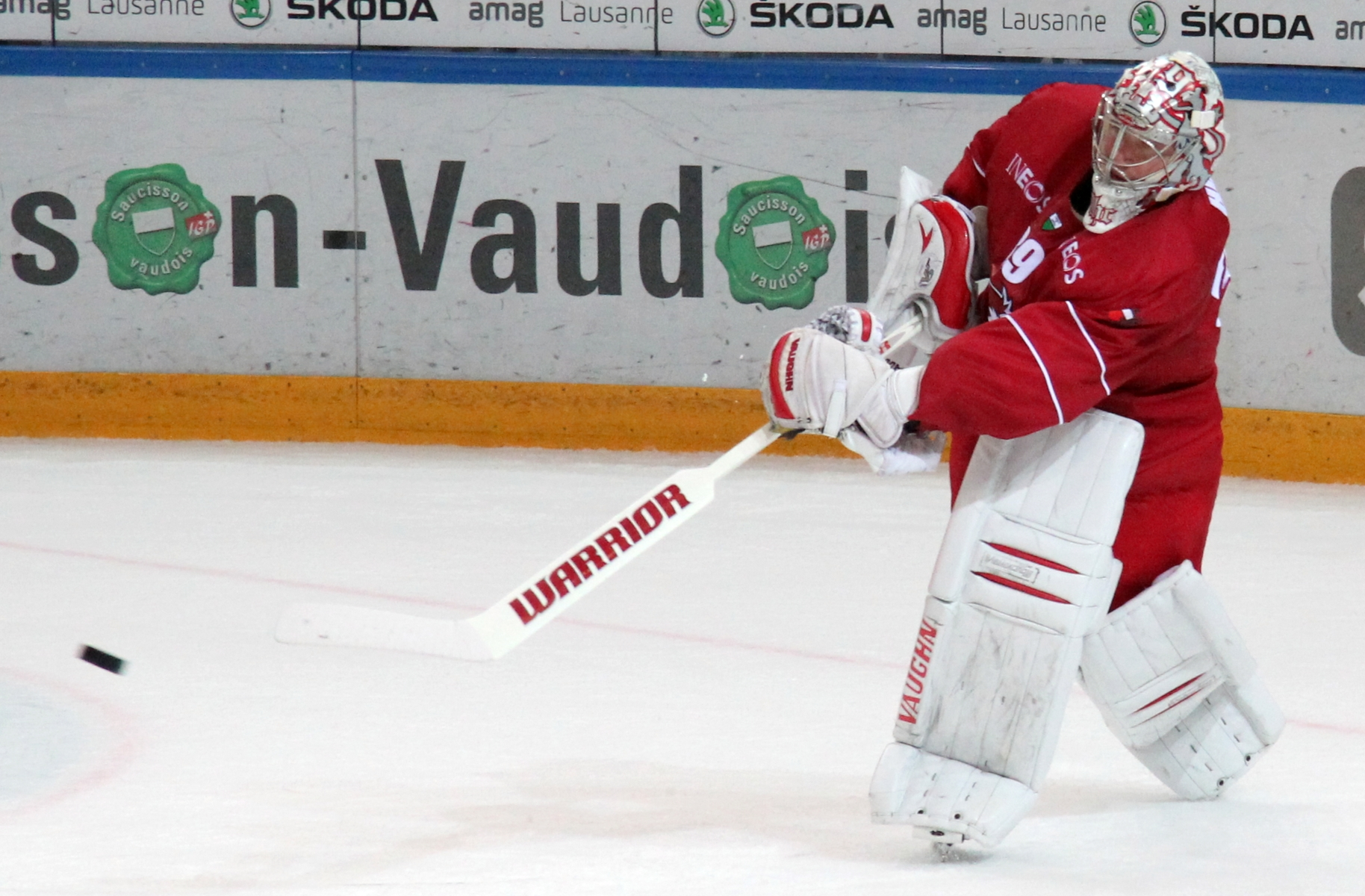
Huet with LHC in September 2014

Huet signed a 4-year deal with Lausanne HC of the National League B. His first season in Lausanne was a success, as the team won the National League B title and went on to win promotion to the National League by defeating SC Langnau in the qualification round.

=== Retirement from the French national team ===
In May 2017, Huet played at the 2017 IIHF World Championship, in Paris, representing France. He played his last game at the final round robin game of France, against Slovenia, with a win, and ended with a standing ovation, retiring with France's Team Captain Laurent Meunier. Team France (Les Bleus) did not advance to the medal round, but was not relegated.

== Career statistics ==
=== Regular season and playoffs ===
			Regular season										Playoffs
Season	Team	League	GP	W	L	T	OTL	MIN	GA	SO	GAA	SV%	GP	W	L	MIN	GA	SO	GAA	SV%
1994–95	Brûleurs de Loups	FRA	—	—	—	—	—	—	—	—	—	—	7	—	—	—	—	—	—	—
1995–96	Brûleurs de Loups	FRA	25	—	—	—	—	—	—	—	—	—	—	—	—	—	—	—	—	—
1996–97	Brûleurs de Loups	FRA	28	—	—	—	—	—	—	—	—	—	11	—	—	—	—	—	—	—
1997–98	Brûleurs de Loups	FRA	29	—	—	—	—	—	—	—	—	—	12	—	—	—	—	—	—	—
1998–99	HC Lugano	NDA	21	—	—	—	—	1275	58	1	2.73	—	10	—	—	628	18	1	1.72	—
1999–00	HC Lugano	NLA	31	—	—	—	—	1886	50	8	1.59	—	13	—	—	783	29	0	2.22	—
2000–01	HC Lugano	NLA	39	—	—	—	—	2365	77	6	1.95	—	18	—	—	1141	39	2	2.05	—
2001–02	HC Lugano	NLA	39	—	—	—	—	2313	107	4	2.78	—	1	—	—	60	3	0	3.00	—
2002–03	Manchester Monarchs	AHL	30	16	8	5	—	1784	68	1	2.29	.922	1	0	1	30	4	0	8.08	.778
2002–03	Los Angeles Kings	NHL	12	4	4	1	—	541	21	1	2.33	.913	—	—	—	—	—	—	—	—
2003–04	Los Angeles Kings	NHL	41	10	16	10	—	2199	89	3	2.43	.907	—	—	—	—	—	—	—	—
2004–05	Adler Mannheim	DEL	36	—	—	—	—	2001	93	1	2.79	.915	14	—	—	850	40	2	2.82	.919
2005–06	Hamilton Bulldogs	AHL	4	0	4	—	0	237	15	0	3.79	.862	—	—	—	—	—	—	—	—
2005–06	Montreal Canadiens	NHL	36	18	11	—	4	2102	77	7	2.20	.929	6	2	4	385	15	0	2.33	.929
2006–07	Montreal Canadiens	NHL	42	19	16	—	3	2286	107	2	2.81	.916	—	—	—	—	—	—	—	—
2007–08	Montreal Canadiens	NHL	39	21	12	—	6	2278	97	2	2.55	.916	—	—	—	—	—	—	—	—
2007–08	Washington Capitals	NHL	13	11	2	—	0	771	21	2	1.63	.936	7	3	4	451	22	0	2.90	.909
2008–09	Chicago Blackhawks	NHL	41	20	15	—	4	2351	99	3	2.53	.909	3	1	2	130	7	0	3.23	.910
2009–10	Chicago Blackhawks	NHL	48	26	14	—	4	2731	114	4	2.50	.895	1	0	0	20	0	0	0.00	1.000
2010–11	HC Fribourg–Gottéron	NLA	41	12	21	—	1	2461	120	4	2.92	.888	3	0	3	155	11	0	4.24	.810
2011–12	HC Fribourg–Gottéron	NLA	39	23	10	—	0	2322	83	6	2.14	.912	11	4	5	694	28	1	2.42	.910
2012–13	Lausanne HC	NLB	36	—	—	—	—	—	—	—	2.33	—	13	—	—	—	—	—	2.67	—
2013–14	Lausanne HC	NLA	45	19	20	—	2	2649	91	1	2.06	.929	7	3	3	407	16	0	2.36	.922
2014–15	Lausanne HC	NLA	37	16	13	—	0	2158	67	7	1.86	.931	7	2	4	447	11	0	1.48	.941
2015–16	Lausanne HC	NLA	46	17	22	—	2	2768	112	1	2.43	.910	—	—	—	—	—	—	—	—
2016–17	Lausanne HC	NLA	40	23	15	—	0	2404	99	7	2.47	.919	4	0	4	261	13	0	2.98	.908
2017–18	Lausanne HC	NL	21	7	12	—	4	1104	64	1	3.48	.886	—	—	—	—	—	—	—	—
NDA/NLA/NL totals			399	—	—	—	—	23,705	928	46	2.35	—	74	—	—	4576	168	4	2.20	—
NHL totals			272	129	90	11	21	15,261	625	24	2.46	.913	17	6	10	987	44	0	2.68	.918

=== International ===
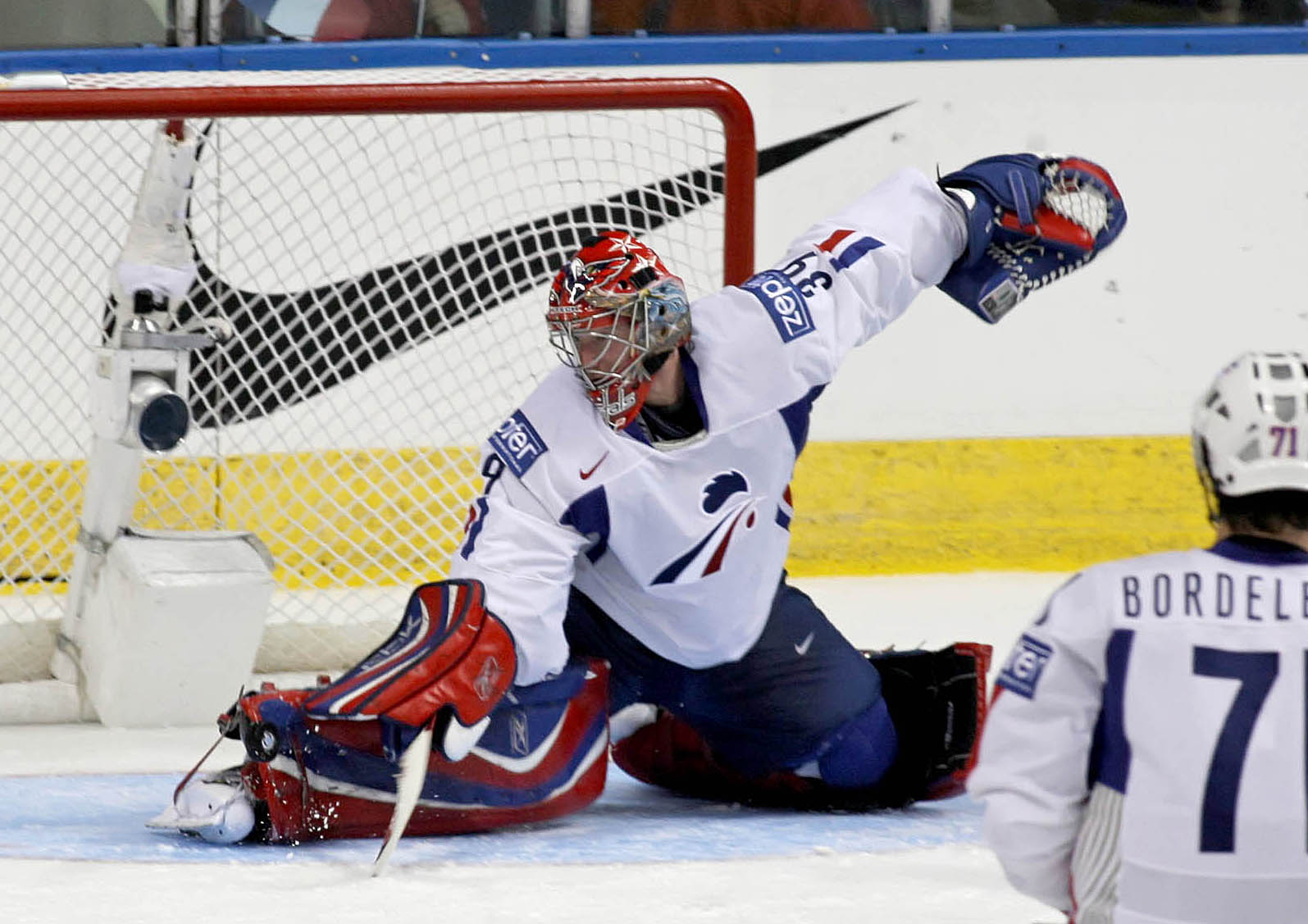
Cristobal Huet at the IIHF World Championship Quebec 2008

Year	Team	Event	GP	W	L	T	MIN	GA	SO	GAA	SV%
1992	France	EJC B	3							1.62	.929
1993	France	EJC B	6							2.29
1995	France	WJC B	7							2.14	.899
1997	France	WC	3				101	12	0	7.13	.793
1998	France	OG	2	1	1	0	120	5	0	2.50	.925
1998	France	WC	1				5	3	0	36.00	.400
1998	France	WC Q	3	2	1	0	180	7	0	2.33
1999	France	WC	1	0	1	0	60	6	0	6.00	.714
1999	France	WC Q	3	1	1	1	180	10	0	3.33	.897
2000	France	WC	4	1	2	1	239	11	0	2.76	.892
2001	France	OGQ	3	1	0	2	179	5	0	1.68	.952
2001	France	WC D1	4	2	1	1	240	9	1	2.25	.886
2002	France	OG	3	0	2	1	179	10	0	3.36	.884
2002	France	WC D1	5	4	1	0	299	5	2	1.00	.938
2004	France	WC	4	0	3	1	198	17	0	5.19	.851
2005	France	OGQ	5	3	1	1	299	5	2	1.00	.957
2008	France	WC	5	2	3	—	250	15	0	3.60	.911
2011	France	WC	6	1	5	—	282	16	0	3.41	.913
2012	France	WC	5	3	2	—	299	18	0	3.61	.882
2013	France	OGQ	2	1	1	—	122	5	0	2.44	.909
2013	France	WC	5	1	4	—	266	16	0	3.36	.902
2014	France	WC	6	2	2	—	369	16	0	2.60	.902
2015	France	WC	5	1	3	—	288	10	1	2.09	.923
2016	France	WC	5	1	3	—	276	14	0	3.05	.884
2017	France	OGQ	3	2	1	—	179	4	0	1.33	.944
2017	France	WC	4	1	1	—	249	10	0	2.41	.899
Tier I senior totals			59	—	—	—	3181	179	1	3.38	—
Tier II senior totals			28	16	7	3	1678	50	5	1.79	—

== Honours ==
- French Elite League Champion with the Brûleurs de loups of Grenoble, 1997/98
- Albert Hassler Trophy (Most Valuable Domestic Player in the French Elite League), 1997/98
- Jean Ferrand Trophy (Most Valuable Goaltender in the French Elite League), 1996/97 and 1997/98
- Swiss National A League Champion with HC Lugano, 1998/99
- European Hockey League Final Four with HC Lugano, 1999/00
- Jacques Plante Trophy (Best GAA in the Swiss National A League), 1999/00 and 2000/01
- Roger Crozier Saving Grace Award (Best Save% in the NHL – National Hockey League), 2005/06
- Nominee for Bill Masterton Trophy (Awarded to the player who best exemplifies the qualities of perseverance, sportsmanship, and dedication to ice hockey.), 2005/2006
- NHL Defensive Player of the Week 3–5–06
- NHL All Star Team roster – 2007
- Nominee for NHL All Star team – 2008
- NHL 3rd star for January 2008
- NHL 3rd star of the week (Feb 15–21 2009)
- NHL 1st star of the week (Dec 14–21 2009)
- NHL 2010 Stanley Cup Champion (Season 2009–2010)
- Inducted into the IIHF Hall of Fame in 2023

Preceded by Dwayne Roloson	Winner of the Crozier Award; 2006	Succeeded by Niklas Bäckström
