= Daniel Reiss =

German ice hockey player

- Born: August 24, 1982 (age 43) Hannover, West Germany
- Height: 6 ft 1 in (185 cm)
- Weight: 176 lb (80 kg; 12 st 8 lb)
- Position: Defence
- Shoots: Left
- DEL team: Hannover Scorpions
- NHL draft: Undrafted
- Playing career: 2000–present

Daniel Reiss (born August 24, 1982) is a German professional ice hockey defenceman who plays for the Hannover Scorpions in the Deutsche Eishockey Liga (DEL).

== Career statistics ==
| | | | Regular season | | | | | Playoffs |
| Season | Team | League | GP | G | A | Pts | PIM | GP | G | A | Pts | PIM |
|---|---|---|---|---|---|---|---|---|---|---|---|---|
| 1999–00 | KEV Hannover | Germany3 | 7 | 1 | 1 | 2 | 4 | — | — | — | — | — |
| 2000–01 | KEV Hannover | Germany3 | 35 | 6 | 6 | 12 | 65 | — | — | — | — | — |
| 2001–02 | KEV Hannover | Germany4 | 29 | 28 | 31 | 59 | 57 | 17 | 9 | 11 | 20 | 14 |
| 2002–03 | Hannover Scorpions | DEL | 3 | 0 | 0 | 0 | 0 | — | — | — | — | — |
| 2002–03 | KEV Hannover | Germany3 | 28 | 7 | 7 | 14 | 12 | — | — | — | — | — |
| 2002–03 | EC Wedemark Farmers | Germany4 | — | — | — | — | — | — | — | — | — | — |
| 2003–04 | KEV Hannover | Germany3 | 47 | 1 | 8 | 9 | 46 | 2 | 0 | 0 | 0 | 8 |
| 2004–05 | Hannover Indians | Germany3 | 41 | 4 | 5 | 9 | 59 | 10 | 2 | 1 | 3 | 6 |
| 2005–06 | Hannover Indians | Germany3 | 52 | 3 | 10 | 13 | 115 | 8 | 0 | 0 | 0 | 22 |
| 2006–07 | Hannover Indians | Germany3 | 44 | 2 | 10 | 12 | 95 | 1 | 1 | 0 | 1 | 0 |
| 2008–09 | Nice hockey Côte d'Azur | France2 | 26 | 7 | 9 | 16 | 131 | 2 | 1 | 1 | 2 | 2 |
| 2009–10 | HC Amneville-Moselle | France2 | 26 | 5 | 12 | 17 | 74 | — | — | — | — | — |
| 2010–11 | Hannover Scorpions | DEL | 46 | 0 | 0 | 0 | 0 | 5 | 0 | 0 | 0 | 0 |
| 2011–12 | Herforder EV | Germany3 | 20 | 13 | 14 | 27 | 79 | — | — | — | — | — |
| 2011–12 | EC Kassel Huskies | Germany3 | 14 | 3 | 7 | 10 | 4 | 2 | 0 | 0 | 0 | 2 |
| 2012–13 | EC Kassel Huskies | Germany3 | 36 | 1 | 19 | 20 | 38 | 12 | 0 | 0 | 0 | 6 |
| 2013–14 | Hannover Indians | Germany3 | 19 | 4 | 14 | 18 | 36 | 8 | 0 | 5 | 5 | 16 |
| 2014–15 | Hannover Scorpions | Germany3 | 30 | 8 | 26 | 34 | 22 | 14 | 2 | 8 | 10 | 10 |
| 2015–16 | Hannover Indians | Germany3 | — | — | — | — | — | — | — | — | — | — |
| 2019–20 | Hannover Scorpions | Germany3 | 22 | 1 | 3 | 4 | 22 | — | — | — | — | — |
| DEL totals | | | 49 | 0 | 0 | 0 | 0 | 5 | 0 | 0 | 0 | 0 |
| Germany3 totals | | | 395 | 54 | 130 | 184 | 597 | 57 | 5 | 14 | 19 | 70 |
| France2 totals | | | 52 | 12 | 21 | 33 | 205 | 2 | 1 | 1 | 2 | 2 |

== See also ==
- Ice hockey in Germany
