= Jani Tuominen =

Finnish ice hockey centre

- Born: March 16, 1971 (age 54); Turku, Finland
- Height: 5 ft 11 in (180 cm)
- Weight: 187 lb (85 kg; 13 st 5 lb)
- Position: Centre
- Shot: Left
- Played for: Lukko; Frisk Asker; Ducs d'Angers; HC Pustertal Wölfe; London Racers; Brûleurs de Loups; HC Torinovalpe; Milano Vipers
- Playing career: 1992–2007

Jani Tuominen (born March 16, 1971) is a Finnish former ice hockey centre.

Tuominen played 17 games for Lukko during the 1996–97 SM-liiga season, scoring two goals and one assist. He also played in Norway's Eliteserien for Frisk Asker, France's Élite Ligue for Ducs d'Angers and Brûleurs de loups, Italy's Serie A for HC Pustertal Wölfe, HC Torinovalpe and Milano Vipers and the United Kingdom's Elite Ice Hockey League for the London Racers.

== Career statistics ==
			Regular season					Playoffs
Season	Team	League	GP	G	A	Pts	PIM	GP	G	A	Pts	PIM
1992–93	Kiekko-67	I-Divisioona	42	8	8	16	20	—	—	—	—	—
1993–94	Kiekko-67	I-Divisioona	46	9	6	15	14	—	—	—	—	—
1994–95	Kiekko-67	I-Divisioona	36	5	9	14	22	7	0	0	0	6
1995–96	Kiekko-67	I-Divisioona	39	19	18	37	71	1	0	0	0	0
1996–97	Kiekko-67	I-Divisioona	22	8	3	11	10	—	—	—	—	—
1996–97	Lukko	SM-liiga	17	2	1	3	6	—	—	—	—	—
1997–98	Frisk Asker Ishockey	Norway	41	19	10	29	20	—	—	—	—	—
1997–98	TUTO Hockey	I-Divisioona	4	0	0	0	4	—	—	—	—	—
1998–99	Ducs d'Angers	France	41	22	12	34	40	—	—	—	—	—
1999–00	Ducs d'Angers	France	34	22	16	38	35	—	—	—	—	—
2000–01	HC Pustertal Wölfe	Italy	27	14	10	24	4	—	—	—	—	—
2001–02	Ducs d'Angers	France	—	13	14	27	—	—	—	—	—	—
2002–03	Ducs d'Angers	France	21	8	15	23	32	—	—	—	—	—
2003–04	Olofströms IK	Division 1	5	2	0	2	0	—	—	—	—	—
2003–04	London Racers	EIHL	56	10	16	26	38	—	—	—	—	—
2003–04	Brûleurs de Loups	France	1	0	0	0	0	8	0	5	5	2
2003–04	HC Torinovalpe	Italy	25	13	5	19	12	—	—	—	—	—
2004–05	Milano Vipers	Italy	28	1	7	8	4	—	—	—	—	—
2005–06	Bisons de Neuilly-sur-Marne	France2	28	10	19	29	62	—	—	—	—	—
2006–07	Albatros de Brest	France3	24	23	22	45	48	4	0	2	2	4
SM-liiga totals			17	2	1	3	6	—	—	—	—	—
I-Divisioona totals			189	49	44	93	141	8	0	0	0	6
France totals			97	65	57	122	107	8	0	5	5	2
Italy totals			80	28	22	50	20	—	—	—	—	—
