= Joona Kunnas =

Finnish ice hockey defenceman

- Born: January 8, 1993 (age 32); Vantaa, Finland
- Height: 6 ft 4 in (193 cm)
- Weight: 205 lb (93 kg; 14 st 9 lb)
- Position: Defence
- Shoots: Left
- Ligue Magnus team Former teams: Anglet Hormadi Élite; Ilves; Brûleurs de loups
- Playing career: 2017–present

Joona Kunnas (born January 8, 1993) is a Finnish professional ice hockey defenceman who plays for Anglet Hormadi Élite in the Ligue Magnus.

Kunnas previously played ten games in Liiga for Ilves during the 2016–17 season. On June 23, 2017, he joined Brûleurs de Loups of the Ligue Magnus in France. He then joined fellow French side Anglet Hormadi Élite on September 2, 2018. He re-signed with the team on June 7, 2019.

Before turning professional, Kunnas spent four seasons with the University of Connecticut Huskies men's ice hockey team.
