= Kysela =

Kysela (feminine Kyselová) is a Czech surname. Notable people with the surname include:

- Daniel Kysela (born 1970), Czech ice hockey player
- Jan Kysela (born 1985), Czech footballer
- Jaroslav Kysela, developer of the Advanced Linux Sound Architecture (ALSA)
- Marek Kysela (born 1992), Czech footballer
