= 2010–11 FFHG Division 1 season =

The 2010–11 FFHG Division 1 season was contested by 14 teams, and saw the Bisons de Neuilly-sur-Marne win the championship. They were promoted to the Ligue Magnus as result. The Castors d’Avignon and the Chiefs de Deuil-Garges were relegated to FFHG Division 2.

== Regular season ==
	Team	GP	W	OTW	OTL	L	Pts	GF	GA	Diff
1.	Albatros de Brest	26	18	5	0	3	46	195	79	+116
2.	Bisons de Neuilly-sur-Marne	26	18	2	2	4	42	131	62	+69
3.	Boxers de Bordeaux	26	17	3	0	6	40	124	88	+36
4.	Phénix de Reims	26	17	3	0	6	40	142	79	+63
5.	Orques d’Anglet	26	15	1	4	6	36	111	82	+29
6.	Vipers de Montpellier	26	14	1	5	6	35	120	86	+34
7.	Aigles de Nice	26	11	3	1	11	29	102	105	-3
8.	Scorpions de Mulhouse	26	10	1	6	9	28	92	90	+2
9.	Coqs de Courbevoie	26	8	2	2	14	22	94	123	-29
10.	Bélougas de Toulouse-Blagnac	26	8	1	3	14	21	80	123	-43
11.	Lynx de Valence	26	7	1	1	17	17	87	153	-66
12.	Castors d’Avignon	26	6	0	1	19	13	76	148	-72
13.	Jokers de Cergy	26	5	1	0	20	12	81	143	-62
14.	Chiefs de Deuil-Garges	26	3	1	0	22	8	84	158	-74

== Playoffs ==
Quarter-finals
Albatros de Brest	2
Scorpions de Mulhouse	0
Phénix de Reims	2
Orques d'Anglet	1
Boxers de Bordeaux	2
Vipers de Montpellier	1
Bisons de Neuilly-sur-Marne	2
Aigles de Nice	0

Semi-finals
Albatros de Brest	2
Phénix de Reims	0
Boxers de Bordeaux	1
Bisons de Neuilly-sur-Marne	2

Final
Albatros de Brest	0
Bisons de Neuilly-sur-Marne	2
