= Michael Kubíček =

Czech ice hockey defenceman

- Born: January 12, 1967 (age 58) Tábor, Czechoslovakia
- Height: 6 ft 0 in (183 cm)
- Weight: 192 lb (87 kg; 13 st 10 lb)
- Position: Defence
- Shot: Left
- Played for: HC České Budějovice; Brûleurs de Loups; LHC Les Lions
- Playing career: 1986–2007

Michael Kubíček (born January 12, 1967) is a Czech former professional ice hockey defenceman.

Kubíček played in the Czechoslovak First Ice Hockey League and the Czech Extraliga for HC České Budějovice, playing 234 games for the team over seven seasons. He also three seasons in the Élite Ligue in France for Brûleurs de Loups and LHC Les Lions.
