= Tuominen =

Tuominen is a Finnish surname of Virtanen type derived from the word tuomi. Notable people with the surname include:

- Adam Tuominen (born 1980), Australian actor
- Anneli Tuominen (born 1954), Finnish lawyer and economist
- Arvo Tuominen (1894–1981), Finnish politician and journalist
- Erkki Tuominen (1914–1975), Finnish politician
- Henri Tuominen (born 1991), Finnish ice hockey player
- Jaakko Tuominen (1944–2001), Finnish hurdler
- Jaana Tuominen (born 1960), Finnish business executive
- Jani Tuominen (born 1971), Finnish ice hockey player
- Jasse Tuominen (born 1995), Finnish football player
- Joni Tuominen (born 1982), Finnish ice hockey player
- Kaarlo Tuominen (1908–2006), Finnish steeplechase runner
- Kalevi Tuominen (1927–2020), Finnish basketball coach and player and sports executive
- Minttu Tuominen (born 1990), Finnish ice hockey player
- Oiva Tuominen (1908–1976), Finnish fighter ace and a Mannerheim Cross knight
- Olli Tuominen (born 1979), Finnish squash player
- Raili Tuominen-Hämäläinen (1932–2014), Finnish gymnast
- Reino Tuominen (1935–1974), Finnish gymnast
- Saara Tuominen (born 1986), Finnish ice hockey player
- Satu Tuominen (born 1985), Finnish retired ice hockey player
- Tomi Tuominen (born 1971), Finnish former rally co-driver
- Visa Tuominen (born 1983), Finnish figure skater
- Yrjö Tuominen (1892–1946), Finnish actor

== See also ==
- 13994 Tuominen, asteroid
