= Geoffrey Paillet =

French ice hockey player

- Born: 22 December 1986 (age 38); Tours, FRA
- Height: 5 ft 9 in (175 cm)
- Weight: 156 lb (71 kg; 11 st 2 lb)
- Position: Forward
- Shoots: Left
- FFHG Division 2 team Former teams: Remparts de Tours; Gothiques d'Amiens
- National team: France
- Playing career: 2004–present

Geoffrey Paillet (born 22 December 1986 in Tours, France) is a professional ice hockey forward currently playing for the Remparts de Tours.

== Career ==
Paillet made his senior debut in 2004 for the Amiens squad in France's FFHG Division 2 championship. After two years in lower championships for Amiens he graduated to Amiens' Ligue Magnus team for seasons 2005 and 2006. Paillet moved to the Lyon Hockey Club in 2007, where he was part of the vice-champion squad that lost to Nice in the final game of the playoff series.

In addition to his professional career Paillet is also the coach of Lyon's LHC Poussins team for players aged under 11 years.

== Playing Style ==
Paillet is short, light and fast at only 176 cm (5 ft 9½ in) and 71 kg (157 lb) and he plays left-handed.
