= 1992–93 Nationale 1 season =

The 1992–93 Nationale 1 season was the 72nd season of the Nationale 1, the top level of ice hockey in France. 16 teams participated in the league, and the Dragons de Rouen won their third league title. Diables Rouges de Valenciennes was relegated to the Nationale 2.

== First round ==
=== Southern Group ===
	Pts	GP	W	T	L	GF	GA	Diff
Dragons de Rouen	26	14	13	0	1	135	24	+111
Huskies de Chamonix	26	14	13	0	1	95	34	+61
Rapaces de Gap	16	14	8	0	6	60	75	-15
Brûleurs de Loups de Grenoble	15	14	7	1	6	61	65	-4
Pingouins de Morzine	10	14	4	2	8	41	90	-49
Ours de Villard-de-Lans	9	14	4	1	9	44	71	-27
Aigles de Saint-Gervais	7	14	3	1	10	52	88	-36
Boucs de Megève	3	14	1	1	12	34	75	-41

=== Northern Group ===
	Pts	GP	W	T	L	GF	GA	Diff
Gothiques d'Amiens	26	14	13	0	1	137	52	+85
Flammes Bleues de Reims	22	14	11	0	3	102	52	+50
Ducs d'Angers	19	14	9	1	4	79	51	+28
Orques d'Anglet	15	14	7	1	6	69	59	+10
Jets de Viry-Essonne	14	14	7	0	7	91	73	+18
Maritimes de Dunkerque	11	14	5	1	8	53	85	-32
Corsaires de Nantes	4	14	2	0	12	50	114	-64
Diables Rouges de Valenciennes	1	14	0	1	13	39	134	-85

== Second round ==
=== N1C Group ===
	Pts	GP	W	T	L	GF	GA	Diff
Maritimes de Dunkerque	16	10	7	2	1	54	26	+28
Boucs de Megève	13	10	6	1	3	47	37	+10
Aigles de Saint-Gervais	10	10	5	0	5	56	51	+5
Ours de Villard-de-Lans	10	10	3	4	3	40	46	-6
Corsaires de Nantes	9	10	4	1	5	54	54	0
Diables Rouges de Valenciennes	4	10	0	2	8	37	74	-37

=== N1B Group ===
	Pts	GP	W	T	L	GF	GA	Diff
Ducs d'Angers	15	10	7	1	2	81	32	+49
Orques d'Anglet	14	10	7	0	3	57	40	+17
Brûleurs de Loups de Grenoble	14	10	7	0	3	53	41	+12
Jets de Viry-Essonne	10	10	7	2	4	54	58	-4
Pingouins de Morzine	4	10	2	0	8	37	72	35
Aigles bleus de Gap	3	10	1	1	8	27	66	-39

=== 5th-8th place playoffs ===
Semi-finals
Brûleurs de Loups de Grenoble	6
Orques d'Anglet	7
Jets de Viry-Essonne	3
Ducs d'Angers	7

Final
Orques d'Anglet	5
Ducs d'Angers	8
Third place
Not played

=== N1A Group ===
	Pts	GP	W	T	L	GF	GA	Diff.
Dragons de Rouen	24	12	12	0	0	80	27	+53
Huskies de Chamonix	8	12	4	0	8	42	55	-13
Flammes Bleues de Reims	8	12	4	0	8	46	66	-20
Gothiques d'Amiens	8	12	4	0	8	39	69	-20

==== Playoffs ====
Semi-finals
Dragons de Rouen	3
HC Amiens Somme	2
Chamonix Hockey Club	3
Hockey Club de Reims	2

Final
Dragons de Rouen	3
Chamonix Hockey Club	1
Third place
Hockey Club de Reims	1
HC Amiens Somme	3
