= Ľubomír Dinda =

Slovak ice hockey defenceman

- Born: 30 June 1994 (age 31) Kežmarok, Slovakia
- Height: 5 ft 11 in (180 cm)
- Weight: 176 lb (80 kg; 12 st 8 lb)
- Position: Defence
- Shoots: Left
- France2 team Former teams: Corsaires de Dunkerque; HK Poprad; Lions de Lyon; Diables Rouges de Briançon
- National team: Slovakia
- Playing career: 2012–present

Ľubomír Dinda (born 30 June 1994) is a Slovak professional ice hockey defencemanwho plays for Corsaires de Dunkerque of the FFHG Division 1.

Previously, Dinda has played in 261 regular season games for HK Poprad of the Tipsport Liga from 2012 to 2018. On 17 May 2018, Dinda moved to France to join Lions de Lyon of the Ligue Magnus. On 2 September 2019, he moved to fellow Magnus side Diables Rouges de Briançon. Dinda was released by the team on 30 January 2020, following a back injury.
