= Cédric Di Dio Balsamo =

French ice hockey player

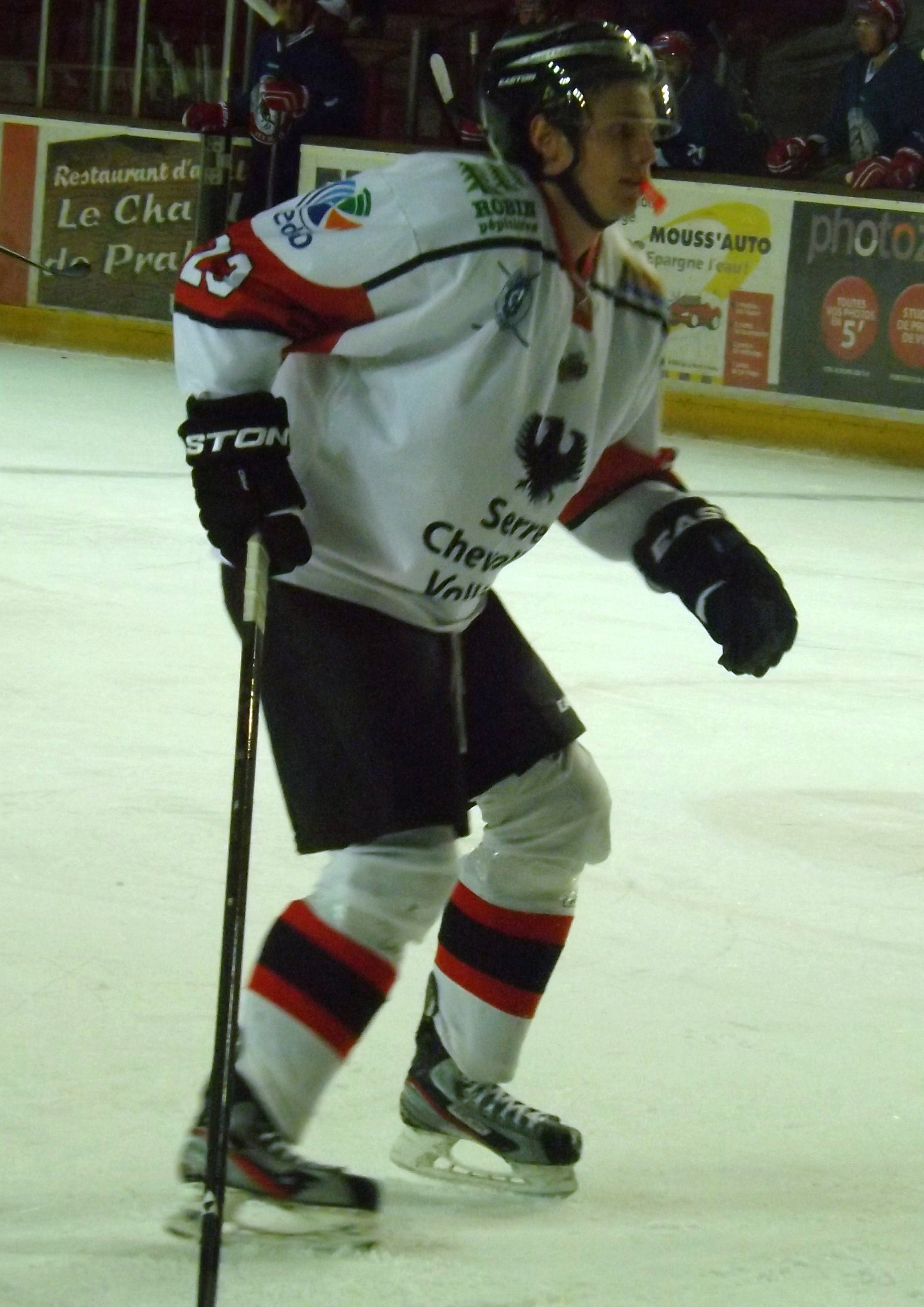
- Born: 27 March 1994 (age 31) Briançon, France
- Height: 1.80 m (5 ft 11 in)
- Weight: 80 kg (176 lb; 12 st 8 lb)
- Position: Forward
- Shoots: Left
- LM team Former teams: Ducs d'Angers; Diables Rouges de Briançon; Rapaces de Gap; Lions de Lyon
- National team: France
- NHL draft: Undrafted
- Playing career: 2011–present

Cédric Di Dio Balsamo (born 27 March 1994) is a French ice hockey player for Ducs d'Angers and the French national team.

He represented France at the 2019 IIHF World Championship.
