= 2005–06 FFHG Division 1 season =

The 2005–06 FFHG Division 1 season was contested by 16 teams, and saw Étoile Noire de Strasbourg win the championship. They were promoted to the Ligue Magnus as result. The Lions de Lyon and the Castors d'Asnières were relegated to FFHG Division 2.

== Regular season ==
=== Northern Group ===
	Team	GP	W	T	L	Goals	Diff.	Pts
1	Corsaires de Dunkerque	14	11	1	2	67 - 39	+28	23
2	Bisons de Neuilly-sur-Marne	14	10	1	3	74 - 42	+32	21
3	Anges du Vésinet	14	8	0	6	58 - 67	-9	16
4	Coqs de Courbevoie	14	7	1	6	74 - 53	+21	15
5	Galaxians d’Amnéville	14	6	1	7	53 - 51	+2	13
6	Chiefs de Garges-lès-Gonnesse	14	4	2	8	47 - 74	-27	8
7	Jokers de Cergy	14	3	1	10	52 - 77	-25	7
8	Castors d'Asnières	14	3	1	10	49 - 71	-22	7

=== Southern Group ===
	Team	GP	W	T	L	Goals	Diff.	Pts
1	Étoile Noire de Strasbourg	14	11	2	1	95 - 34	+61	24
2	Chevaliers du Lac d’Annecy	14	7	4	3	53 - 46	+7	18
3	Vipers de Montpellier	14	6	5	3	66 - 56	+10	17
4	Castors d’Avignon	14	5	3	6	43 - 48	-5	13
5	Taureaux de Feu de Limoges	14	4	4	6	52 - 71	-19	12
6	Lynx de Valence	14	5	2	7	44 - 62	-18	11
7	Lions de Lyon	14	3	4	7	45 - 59	-14	10
8	Jets de Viry	14	1	2	11	35 - 57	-22	4

== Second round ==
=== Final round ===
	Team	GP	W	T	L	Goals	Diff.	Pts
1	Étoile Noire de Strasbourg	14	12	0	2	99 - 32	+67	24
2	Corsaires de Dunkerque	14	9	1	4	75 - 49	+26	19
3	Vipers de Montpellier	14	7	1	6	46 - 49	-3	15
4	Bisons de Neuilly-sur-Marne	14	6	1	7	60 - 62	-2	13
5	Anges du Vésinet	14	4	4	6	46 - 66	-20	12
6	Castors d’Avignon	14	5	1	8	44 - 67	-23	11
7	Chevaliers du Lac d’Annecy	14	4	2	8	38 - 68	-30	10
8	Coqs de Courbevoie	14	3	2	9	46 - 61	-15	8

=== Relegation round ===
	Team	GP	W	T	L	Goals	Diff.	Pts
1	Chiefs de Garges-lès-Gonnesse	14	10	0	4	80 - 47	+33	20
2	Galaxians d’Amnéville	14	9	1	4	63 - 45	+18	19
3	Lynx de Valence	14	8	1	5	47 - 45	+2	17
4	Jokers de Cergy	14	6	2	6	45 - 57	-12	14
5	Jets de Viry-Châtillon	14	6	1	7	44 - 42	+2	13
6	Taureaux de Feu de Limoges	14	6	1	7	42 - 44	-2	13
7	Lions de Lyon	14	5	2	7	48 - 49	-1	12
8	Castors d'Asnières	14	0	4	10	34 - 74	-40	4

==== Relegation ====
- Boxers de Bordeaux - Lions de Lyon 7:5/5:3
