= Stanislas Solaux =

French ice hockey forward

- Born: 4 December 1975 (age 50) Saint-Saulve, France
- Height: 6 ft 2 in (188 cm)
- Weight: 194 lb (88 kg; 13 st 12 lb)
- Position: Forward
- Shot: Left
- Played for: Dauphins d'Épinal; Dragons de Rouen; Anglet Hormadi Élite
- National team: France
- Playing career: 1993–2007; 2009–2011

Stanislas Solaux (born 4 December 1975) is a French former ice hockey forward.

Solaux played in the Ligue Magnus for Dauphins d'Épinal, Dragons de Rouen and Anglet Hormadi Élite between 1996 and 2007. He played in the 1998 World Championship for France.
