= 2008–09 FFHG Division 1 season =

The 2008–09 FFHG Division 1 season was contested by 14 teams, and saw the Rapaces de Gap win the championship. They were promoted to the Ligue Magnus as result. The Chiefs de Deuil-Garges and the Jets de Viry-Essonne were relegated to FFHG Division 2.

== Regular season ==
	Team	GP	W	T	L	Pts	GF	GA	Diff
1.	Rapaces de Gap	26	23	2	1	48	167	59	+ 108
2.	Drakkars de Caen	26	20	2	4	42	162	66	+ 96
3.	Boxers de Bordeaux	26	17	2	7	36	119	89	+ 30
4.	Vipers de Montpellier	26	14	5	7	33	132	95	+ 37
5.	Castors d’Avignon	26	15	2	9	32	125	114	+ 11
6.	Jokers de Cergy	26	13	4	9	30	130	121	+ 9
7.	Lynx de Valence	26	12	2	12	26	100	125	25
8.	Aigles de Nice	26	9	6	11	24	91	113	22
9.	Coqs de Courbevoie	26	8	7	11	23	99	95	+ 4
10.	Phénix de Reims	26	8	5	13	21	89	95	6
11.	Chevaliers du Lac d’Annecy	26	6	7	13	19	74	93	19
12.	Galaxians d’Amnéville	26	7	5	14	19	89	133	44
13.	Chiefs de Garges	26	2	3	21	7	69	153	84
14.	Jets de Viry-Essonne	26	1	2	23	4	71	166	95

== Playoffs ==
Quarter-finals
Vipers de Montpellier	7
Castors d’Avignon	8
Rapaces de Gap	12
Aigles de Nice	7
Drakkars de Caen	18
Lynx de Valence	7
Boxers de Bordeaux	5
Jokers de Cergy-Pontoise	6

Semi-finals
Castors d’Avignon	4
Rapaces de Gap	10
Drakkars de Caen	15
Jokers de Cergy-Pontoise	12

Final
Rapaces de Gap	10
Drakkars de Caen	6
