= 2009–10 FFHG Division 1 season =

The 2009–10 FFHG Division 1 season was contested by 14 teams, and saw the Drakkars de Caen win the championship. They were promoted to the Ligue Magnus as result. The Chevaliers du Lac d’Annecy and the Galaxians d’Amnéville were relegated to FFHG Division 2.

== Regular season ==
	Team	GP	W	OTW	OTL	L	Pts	GF	GA	Diff
1.	Drakkars de Caen	26	22	1	0	3	46	153	79	+ 74
2.	Albatros de Brest	26	22	0	0	4	44	169	57	+ 112
3.	Scorpions de Mulhouse	26	15	2	1	8	35	113	70	+ 43
4.	Phenix de Reims	26	10	5	2	9	32	128	126	+ 2
5.	Vipers de Montpellier	26	12	3	2	9	32	119	110	+ 9
6.	Boxers de Bordeaux	26	15	0	2	9	32	119	102	+ 17
7.	Castors d’Avignon	26	11	2	0	13	26	110	116	6
8.	Jokers de Cergy-Pontoise	26	9	3	1	13	25	108	122	14
9.	Aigles de Nice	26	6	2	7	11	22	96	131	35
10.	Lynx de Valence	26	9	1	1	15	21	97	142	45
11.	Chiefs de Deuil-Garges	26	9	0	2	15	20	89	127	38
12.	Coqs de Courbevoie	26	7	1	1	17	17	97	136	39
13.	Chevaliers du Lac d’Annecy	26	7	0	2	17	16	83	139	56
14.	Galaxians d’Amneville	26	7	1	0	16	16	88	112	24

== Playoffs ==
Quarter-finals
Drakkars de Caen	13
Jokers de Cergy-Pontoise	3
Phénix de Reims	5
Vipers de Montpellier	4
Albatros de Brest	10
Castors d’Avignon	4
Scorpions de Mulhouse	9
Boxers de Bordeaux	4

Semi-finals
Drakkars de Caen	9
Phénix de Reims	6
Albatros de Brest	15
Scorpions de Mulhouse	4

Final
Drakkars de Caen	6
Albatros de Brest	4
