= 1991–92 Élite Ligue season =

French ice hockey league season

The 1991–92 Élite Ligue season was the 71st season of the Élite Ligue, the top level of ice hockey in France. Eight teams participated in the league, and the Dragons de Rouen won their second league title.

== First round ==
| | Club | GP | W | T | L | GF | GA | Pts |
|---|---|---|---|---|---|---|---|---|
| 1. | Diables Rouges de Briançon | 14 | 11 | 0 | 3 | 100 | 45 | 22 |
| 2. | Dragons de Rouen | 14 | 11 | 0 | 3 | 88 | 47 | 22 |
| 3. | Chamonix Hockey Club | 14 | 11 | 0 | 3 | 78 | 36 | 22 |
| 4. | HC Amiens Somme | 14 | 9 | 1 | 4 | 81 | 61 | 19 |
| 5. | Hockey Club de Reims | 14 | 6 | 1 | 7 | 78 | 70 | 13 |
| 6. | Clermont-Ferrand | 14 | 3 | 0 | 11 | 51 | 111 | 6 |
| 7. | Viry-Châtillon Essonne Hockey | 14 | 2 | 1 | 11 | 54 | 98 | 5 |
| 8. | Image Club d’Épinal | 14 | 1 | 1 | 12 | 43 | 105 | 3 |

Following the first round, Viry-Châtillon and Épinal played the remainder of their season in the Nationale 1 (second tier), where they joined 10 other teams for that league's final round.

== Final round ==
| | Club | GP | W | L | GF | GA | Pts |
|---|---|---|---|---|---|---|---|
| 1. | Dragons de Rouen | 20 | 17 | 3 | 132 | 65 | 25 |
| 2. | Chamonix Hockey Club | 20 | 15 | 5 | 103 | 67 | 22 |
| 3. | Diables Rouges de Briançon | 19 | 13 | 6 | 125 | 58 | 19 |
| 4. | HC Amiens Somme | 20 | 8 | 12 | 100 | 108 | 13 |
| 5. | Hockey Club de Reims | 20 | 5 | 15 | 78 | 121 | 7 |
| 6. | Viry-Châtillon Essonne Hockey | 19 | 1 | 18 | 56 | 175 | 2 |
