= 1993–94 Nationale 1 season =

Ice hockey competition

The 1993–94 Nationale 1 season was the 73rd season of the Nationale 1, the top level of ice hockey in France. 16 teams participated in the league, and the Dragons de Rouen won their fourth league title.

== First round ==
=== Group A ===
	Pts	W	T	L	GF	GA	Diff
Dragons de Rouen	12	6	0	0	78	12	+66
Ducs d'Angers	8	3	0	3	36	20	+16
Pingouins de Morzine	4	2	0	4	16	55	-39
Aigles de Saint-Gervais	0	0	0	6	9	52	-41

=== Group B ===
	Pts	W	T	L	GF	GA	Diff
Huskies de Chamonix	12	6	0	0	39	13	26
Rapaces de Gap	6	3	0	3	25	33	-8
Orques d'Anglet	4	2	0	4	31	33	-2
Ours de Villard-de-Lans	2	1	0	5	29	47	-18

=== Group C ===
	Pts	W	T	L	GF	GA	Diff
Gothiques d'Amiens	12	6	0	0	64	14	+50
Jets de Viry-Essonne	6	3	0	3	34	37	-3
Corsaires de Nantes	6	3	0	3	21	39	-18
Corsaires de Dunkerque	0	0	0	6	15	44	-29

=== Group D ===
	Pts	W	T	L	GF	GA	Diff
Brûleurs de Loups de Grenoble	8	4	0	2	28	20	+8
Albatros de Brest	7	3	1	2	23	22	+1
Flammes Bleues de Reims	7	3	1	2	30	18	+12
Boucs de Megève	2	1	0	5	12	33	-21

== Second round ==
=== N1B ===
	Pts	W	T	L	GF	GA	Diff
Flammes Bleues de Reims	27	13	1	0	130	36	+94
Ours de Villard-de-Lans	19	9	1	4	69	62	+7
Orques d'Anglet	18	8	2	4	78	65	+13
Corsaires de Dunkerque	18	7	4	3	75	62	+13
Boucs de Megève	11	5	1	8	50	83	-33
Corsaires de Nantes	8	4	0	10	47	78	-31
Pingouins de Morzine	6	2	2	10	44	71	-27
Aigles de Saint-Gervais	5	2	1	11	43	79	-36

=== N1A ===
	Pts	W	T	L	GF	GA	Diff
Dragons de Rouen	25	12	1	1	118	36	+82
Huskies de Chamonix	18	8	2	4	70	47	+23
Gothiques d'Amiens	17	8	1	5	86	57	+29
Ducs d'Angers	16	7	2	5	69	57	+12
Albatros de Brest	14	6	2	6	61	68	-7
Brûleurs de Loups de Grenoble	12	5	2	7	59	74	-15
Jets de Viry-Essonne	8	3	2	9	62	106	-44
Rapaces de Gap	2	1	0	13	46	126	-80

== Third round ==
=== 13th-16th place ===
	Pts
Boucs de Megève	9
Pingouins de Morzine	7
Corsaires de Nantes	4
Sporting Hockey Club Saint Gervais	4

=== 9th-12th place ===
	Pts
Hockey Club de Reims	11
Orques d'Anglet	6
Corsaires de Dunkerque	5
Ours de Villard-de-Lans	2

=== 5th-8th place round ===
	Pts
Albatros de Brest	11
Jets de Viry-Essonne	9
Brûleurs de Loups de Grenoble	4
Rapaces de Gap	0

=== Final round ===
	Pts	W	T	L	GF	GA	Diff
Dragons de Rouen	10	5	0	1	35	15	+20
Gothiques d'Amiens	8	4	0	2	25	24	+1
Huskies de Chamonix	6	3	0	3	23	18	+5
Ducs d'Angers	0	0	0	6	12	38	-26

== Playoffs ==
Semi-finals
Gothiques d'Amiens	1
Chamonix Hockey Club	3
Dragons de Rouen	3
Ducs d'Angers	0

Final
Chamonix Hockey Club	0
Dragons de Rouen	2
Third place
Ducs d'Angers	0
HC Amiens Somme	1
