= 1997–98 Élite Ligue season =

French ice hockey league season

The 1997–98 Élite Ligue season was the 77th season of the Élite Ligue, the top level of ice hockey in France. 10 teams participated in the league, and Brûleurs de Loups de Grenoble won their fourth league title.

== First round ==
	Club	GP	W	OTW	T	OTL	L	GF	GA	Pts
1.	Brûleurs de Loups de Grenoble	18	17	0	1	0	1	112	33	34
2.	HC Amiens Somme	18	14	0	1	0	3	83	45	29
3.	Hockey Club de Reims	18	10	0	1	1	6	68	44	22
4.	Lyon Hockey Club	18	9	1	1	0	7	68	60	21
5.	Dragons de Rouen	18	10	0	1	0	7	76	54	21
6.	Chamonix Hockey Club	18	7	2	1	0	8	65	67	19
7.	Viry-Châtillon Essonne Hockey	18	7	0	1	0	10	61	92	15
8.	Ducs d'Angers	18	4	0	2	0	12	52	77	10
9.	Anglet Hormadi Élite	18	2	0	1	2	13	44	105	7
10.	Bordeaux Gironde Hockey 2000	18	2	0	1	0	15	38	90	5

== Second round ==
	Club	GP	W	OTW	T	OTL	L	GF	GA	Pts (Bonus)
1.	Brûleurs de Loups de Grenoble	18	14	3	0	0	1	86	47	44(10)
2.	HC Amiens Somme	18	12	0	1	1	4	102	51	35(9)
3.	Lyon Hockey Club	18	12	1	1	0	4	87	64	34(7)
4.	Dragons de Rouen	18	8	1	2	1	6	78	60	27(6)
5.	Hockey Club de Reims	18	8	0	1	1	8	62	53	26(8)
6.	Chamonix Hockey Club	18	9	0	1	0	8	73	62	24(5)
7.	Ducs d'Angers	18	8	0	1	3	6	84	64	23(3)
8.	Bordeaux Gironde Hockey 2000	18	4	1	1	0	12	64	108	12(1)
9.	Viry-Châtillon Essonne Hockey	18	3	0	1	0	14	47	105	11(4)
10.	Anglet Hormadi Élite	18	1	0	1	0	16	50	119	5(2)

== Playoffs ==
Quarter-finals
Brûleurs de Loups de Grenoble	4
Bordeaux Gironde Hockey 2000	0
Dragons de Rouen	4
Hockey Club de Reims	0
HC Amiens Somme	4
Ducs d'Angers	1
Lyon Hockey Club	4
Chamonix Hockey Club	2

Semi-finals
Brûleurs de Loups de Grenoble	3
Dragons de Rouen	2
HC Amiens Somme	3
Lyon Hockey Club	0

Final
Brûleurs de Loups de Grenoble	3
HC Amiens Somme	0
Third place
Lyon Hockey Club	3
Dragons de Rouen	2
