= 1996–97 Nationale 1A season =

French professional ice hockey season

The 1996–97 Nationale 1A season was the 76th season of the Nationale 1A, the top level of ice hockey in France. Eight teams participated in the league, and Albatros de Brest won their second league title. Club des Sports de Megève, Gap Hockey Club, and Image Club d'Epinal were relegated to the Nationale 1B.

== First round ==
	Club	GP	W	T	L	GF	GA	Pts
1.	Hockey Club de Reims	22	20	0	2	143	47	40
2.	Albatros de Brest	22	19	1	2	171	58	39
3.	Brûleurs de Loups de Grenoble	22	16	2	4	128	62	34
4.	Dragons de Rouen	22	16	1	5	137	62	33
5.	HC Amiens Somme	22	13	2	7	118	62	28
6.	Ducs d'Angers	22	11	2	9	108	89	24
7.	Bordeaux Gironde Hockey 2000	22	9	3	10	111	101	21
8.	Lyon Hockey Club	22	6	3	13	75	120	15
9.	Gap Hockey Club	22	4	1	17	66	132	9
10.	Viry-Châtillon Essonne Hockey	22	4	1	17	79	164	9
11.	Club des Sports de Megève	22	4	1	17	57	147	9
12.	Image Club d'Épinal	22	1	1	20	41	196	3

== Second round ==
=== Final round ===
	Club	GP	W	T	L	GF	GA	Pts
1.	Albatros de Brest	10	6	2	2	43	29	14
2.	HC Amiens Somme	10	6	1	3	36	35	13
3.	Flammes Bleues de Reims	10	5	1	4	30	32	11
4.	Dragons de Rouen	10	4	2	4	36	28	10
5.	Brûleurs de Loups de Grenoble	10	3	3	4	32	31	9
6.	Ducs d'Angers	10	1	1	7	26	48	3

=== Qualification round ===
	Club	GP	W	T	L	GF	GA	Pts
7.	Viry-Châtillon Essonne Hockey	10	8	0	2	49	29	16
8.	Bordeaux Gironde Hockey 2000	10	7	0	3	69	31	14
9.	Lyon Hockey Club	10	6	0	4	51	40	12
10.	Gap Hockey Club	10	4	2	4	41	45	10
11.	Club des Sports de Megève	10	2	2	6	47	57	6
12.	Image Club d'Épinal	10	1	0	9	36	91	2

== Playoffs ==
Quarter-finals
Albatros de Brest	3
Bordeaux	1
Dragons de Rouen	2
Brûleurs de Loups de Grenoble	3
HC Amiens Somme	3
Viry-Châtillon Essonne Hockey	0
Hockey Club de Reims	3
Ducs d'Angers	0

Semi-finals
Albatros de Brest	3
Brûleurs de Loups de Grenoble	0
HC Amiens Somme	3
Hockey Club de Reims	1

Final
Albatros de Brest	3
HC Amiens Somme	0
Third place
Hockey Club de Reims	0
Brûleurs de Loups de Grenoble	3

== Relegation round ==
	Club	GP	W	T	L	GF	GA	Pts
1.	Lyon Hockey Club	6	4	1	1	29	19	9
2.	Club des Sports de Megève	6	4	0	2	34	18	8
3.	Gap Hockey Club	6	3	1	2	34	21	7
4.	Image Club d'Épinal	6	0	0	6	17	56	0
