= 2000–01 Élite Ligue season =

French ice hockey league season

The 2000–01 Élite Ligue season was the 80th season of the Élite Ligue, the top level of ice hockey in France. Eight teams participated in the league, and the Dragons de Rouen won their sixth league title.

== Regular season ==
	Club	GP	W/OTW	T	OTL	L	GF	GA	Pts
1.	Dragons de Rouen	28	23	0	1	2	124	57	48
2.	Hockey Club de Reims	28	19	1	1	7	120	83	40
3.	HC Amiens Somme	28	16	1	0	11	97	89	33
4.	Ducs d'Angers	28	14	1	0	13	108	90	29
5.	Anglet Hormadi Élite	28	12	3	1	12	107	94	28
6.	Brûleurs de Loups de Grenoble	28	12	3	0	13	90	91	27
7.	Hockey Club de Caen	28	6	1	0	21	70	126	13
8.	Viry-Châtillon Essonne Hockey	28	3	2	0	23	73	160	8

== Playoffs ==
Quarter-finals
Dragons de Rouen	3
Viry-Châtillon	0
HC Amiens Somme	1
Brûleurs de Loups de Grenoble	3
Hockey Club de Reims	3
Hockey Club de Caen	0
Ducs d'Angers	0
Anglet Hormadi Élite	3

Semi-finals
Dragons de Rouen	3
Brûleurs de Loups de Grenoble	2
Hockey Club de Reims	2
Anglet Hormadi Élite	3

Final
Dragons de Rouen	3
Anglet Hormadi Élite	0
Third place
Hockey Club de Reims	0
Brûleurs de Loups de Grenoble	3
