= 1998–99 Élite Ligue season =

French ice hockey league season

The 1998–99 Élite Ligue season was the 78th season of the Élite Ligue, the top level of ice hockey in France. 10 teams participated in the league, and HC Amiens Somme won their first league title.

== Regular season ==
	Club	GP	W	T	L	GF	GA	Pts
1.	Hockey Club de Reims	36	26	5	5	134	72	38
2.	HC Amiens Somme	36	26	4	6	185	78	38
3.	Brûleurs de Loups de Grenoble	36	22	2	11	146	104	32
4.	Ducs d'Angers	36	18	2	16	141	117	28
5.	Lyon Hockey Club	36	19	1	16	123	100	27
6.	Hockey Club de Caen	36	16	3	17	136	132	24
7.	Anglet Hormadi Élite	36	16	2	18	113	150	22
8.	Dragons de Rouen	36	13	6	18	118	124	19
9.	Chamonix Hockey Club	36	8	3	25	88	151	12
10.	Viry-Châtillon Essonne Hockey	36	1	0	34	64	223	1

== Playoffs ==
Quarter-finals
Hockey Club de Reims	4
Dragons de Rouen	1
Ducs d'Angers	1
Lyon Hockey Club	4
HC Amiens Somme	4
Anglet Hormadi Élite	0
Brûleurs de Loups de Grenoble	4
Hockey Club de Caen	2

Semi-finals
Hockey Club de Reims	3
Lyon Hockey Club	0
HC Amiens Somme	3
Brûleurs de Loups de Grenoble	2

Final
Hockey Club de Reims	0
HC Amiens Somme	3
Third place
Brûleurs de Loups de Grenoble	0
Lyon Hockey Club	3
