= 1999–2000 Élite Ligue season =

French hockey season

The 1999–2000 Élite Ligue season was the 79th season of the Élite Ligue, the top level of ice hockey in France. Nine teams participated in the league, and Hockey Club de Reims won their first league title.

== Regular season ==
	Club	GP	W	OTW	T	OTL	L	GF	GA	Pts
1.	Hockey Club de Reims	32	20	0	2	2	8	138	98	44
2.	Hockey Club de Caen	32	17	3	1	2	9	127	97	43
3.	Dragons de Rouen	32	16	1	6	1	8	139	94	41
4.	HC Amiens Somme	32	18	1	1	1	11	117	97	40
5.	Ducs d'Angers	32	17	0	3	1	11	128	94	38
6.	Anglet Hormadi Élite	32	15	0	2	2	13	134	118	34
7.	Lyon Hockey Club	32	10	1	1	1	19	81	121	24
8.	Chamonix Hockey Club	32	9	1	1	0	91	140	72	21
9.	Viry-Châtillon Essonne Hockey	32	3	3	1	0	25	89	185	13

== Playoffs ==
Quarter-finals
Hockey Club de Caen	3
Lyon Hockey Club	0
Dragons de Rouen	3
Anglet Hormadi Élite	0
Hockey Club de Reims	3
Chamonix Hockey Club	0
HC Amiens Somme	3
Ducs d'Angers	1

Semi-finals
Hockey Club de Caen	3
Dragons de Rouen	2
Hockey Club de Reims	3
HC Amiens Somme	2

Final
Hockey Club de Caen	0
Hockey Club de Reims	1
