= Lyon Hockey Club =

- Nickname: Lions
- City: Lyon
- League: FFHG Division 1
- Founded: 1997, 2021
- Folded: 2019
- Home arena: Patinoire Charlemagne
- Colors: Blue, red, white
- President: (France) Sébastien Berthet
- Affiliates: Télé Lyon Metropole; Tribune de Lyon; Virgin Radio
- Website: https://lyon-hockey.com/

Franchise history
- 1898–1953: Sporting Club de Lyon
- 1953–1997: Club des Patineurs Lyonnais
- 1997–2019: LHC Les Lions
- 2021–present: Lyon Hockey Club

Lyon Hockey Club is a professional ice hockey team in Lyon, France. The team currently competes in the French second league after having been purchased out of bankruptcy in 2021.

== History ==
=== 1898–1953: Ice Hockey in Lyon ===
Ice hockey was played in Lyon as early as 1898 on a rink located on the Boulevard des Belges where today the Guimet Museum stands. The Sporting Club de Lyon (Lyon Sporting Club) won the national Coupe Magnus title in 1905 and 1908 but the rink was converted to a museum in 1909 and Lyon was without a rink and a team for the next 44 years.

=== 1953–1997: The CPL Era ===
In 1953 the Club des Patineurs Lyonnais (Skating Club of Lyon or CPL) was founded and in 1956 the Lyon team won France's Division 1 ice hockey championship. In 1963 CPL built the Patinoire Charlemagne that still today serves as the home of Lyon ice sports. In their new home CPL won France's Division 2 ice hockey championship in both 1972 and 1989. Christophe Geoffroy's management forces the CPL to the liquidation in 1997

=== 1997-2019: LHC Les Lions ===

Following the collapse of CPL local businessman Christophe Geoffroy founded Hockey sur glace lyonnais Elite (Lyon Elite Ice Hockey). Teamed with the Lyon Hockey Club Association, an association charged with developing junior ice hockey, the Lyon Hockey Club was born. The new team experienced quick success and twice finished third in France's Ligue Magnus in 1997 and 1998. LHC qualified for Europe's Continental Cup in 1999 and reached the quarter-finals before being eliminated.

By 2000 LHC had been relegated to France's Division 3 championship but quickly began to rise through national ranks again. In the 2001 season Lyon reached and won the Division 2 championship and earned a place in Division 1 for season 2002. A poor season in 2002 saw the team return to the second division once again and, despite reaching the final in 2007, LHC remained a Division 2 team until 2011. After earning a promotion to Division 1 thanks to their Finals appearance in 2011, the Lions won the league championship in 2014 and earned a promotion to Ligue Magnus. On 13 January 2014 it was announced they will have a partnership with the Tampa Bay Lighting and Syracuse Crunch. In 2019, the professional team was dissolved after bankruptcy.

=== 2021-present: Lyon Hockey Club ===
Towards the end of the COVID-19 pandemic, the Lions were rescued from oblivion and brought back to life in Division 3. Within two years, the club had earned a promotion up to Division Two and then, two years later, won the league championship and rose up to Division 1.

== Broadcasters ==
LHC media partners include Télé Lyon Métropole, the Tribune de Lyon and Virgin Radio.

=== Télé Lyon Métropole ===
LHC matches are a regular feature on Télé Lyon Métropole's Sunday sports review, Dimanche Sports. LHC players are also interviewed frequently for other TLM programs including Lundi Sport.

=== Tribune de Lyon ===
The Tribune de Lyon produces a pre-season guide to the LHC each year and reports on matches each week.

=== Virgin Radio ===
As well as reporting on LHC matches Virgin Radio provides the background music for matches. While the playlist varies by season current songs on the match-night programme include Sleeping Satellite (Junior Caldera) and No Stress (Laurent Wolf).

== Sponsors ==
Major sponsors of the LHC are Fiat, Flunch, Kinnarps, Metifiot, Virgin Radio, Nike Bauer and Air Canada. The LHC also has a number of minor sponsors and supporting sponsors.

== Home Ice ==
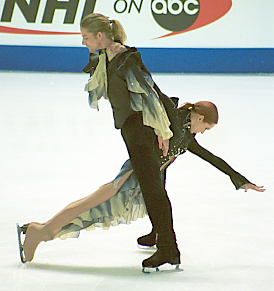
Marina Anissina and Gwendal Peizerat train at the Patinoire Charlemagne

The LHC plays all its home matches at the Patinoire Charlemagne.

Commissioned in 1967 and opened in 1969, the Patinoire Charlemagne's distinctive architectural style incorporating concrete, glass and aluminum saw it placed on the Rhône-Alpes' List of 20th century Buildings of Architectural Interest.

Since May 2006 more than 3.7 million euros have been spent to refurbish the arena and stadium.

Patinoire Charlemagne offers many services apart from the ice hockey rink including medical facilities, a bar, a dance hall, meeting rooms and a press centre.

The Patinoire Charlemagne is also well known for hosting other ice sports, particularly figure skating. Each year the rink hosts the Pôle France de danse sur glace and world champion figure skaters Marina Anissina and Gwendal Peizerat both train at Charlemagne.

The Patinoire Charlemagne was one of the host stadiums for the 2006 European Figure Skating Championships.

The ice is Olympic sized (60 metres long by 30 metres wide) and has a capacity of 4 400 spectators.

== Roster ==
Updated 8 February 2019.

Goaltenders
| Number | | Player | Catches | Acquired | Place of Birth |
|---|---|---|---|---|---|
| 70 | (France) | Sidney David-Thivent | L | 2014 | Lyon, France |
| 1 | (France) | Olivier Richard | L | 2017 | Aix-en-Provence, France |
| 39 | (Slovenia) | Rok Stojanovic | L | 2017 | Kranj, Slovenia |

Defencemen
| Number | | Player | Shoots | Acquired | Place of Birth |
|---|---|---|---|---|---|
| 14 | (France) | Jules Breton | L | 2012 | Strasbourg, France |
| 8 | (France) | Cédric Custosse | L | 2015 | Asnières-sur-Seine, France |
| 94 | (Slovakia) | Lubomir Dinda | L | 2018 | Poprad, Slovakia |
| 21 | (Canada) | Tyler Ferry | L | 2018 | Richmond Hill, Canada |
| 17 | (France) | Vincent Llorca | R | 2018 | Clermont-Ferrand, France |
| 66 | (France) | Alexandre Pascal | R | 2018 | Grenoble, France |
| 38 | (France) | Thomas Roussel (C) | L | 2016 | Amiens, France |

Forwards
| Number | | Player | Shoots | Position | Acquired | Place of Birth |
|---|---|---|---|---|---|---|
| 88 | (Czech Republic) | Tomas Andres | R | C | 2018 | Ústí nad Labem, Czech Republic |
| 26 | (Slovenia) | Jaka Ankerst | L | LW/RW | 2017 | Kranj, Slovenia |
| 19 | (France) | Quentin Berthon (A) | L | LW | 2016 | Lyon, France |
| 77 | (France) | Julien Correia | L | LW | 2014 | Rouen, France |
| 10 | (France) | Sébastien Delemps | L | C | 2016 | Valence, France |
| 27 | (France) | Cédric Di Dio Balsamo | L | LW | 2018 | Briançon, France |
| 9 | (Canada) | Kyle Essery (A) | R | RW | 2018 | Mississauga, Canada |
| 11 | (France) | Hugo Faure | L | LW | 2016 | Oullins, France |
| 93 | (Russia) | Daniil Kulikov | L | LW/C | 2018 | Novosibirsk, Russia |
| 73 | (France) | Killian Lairet | R | RW | 2017 | Lyon, France |
| 98 | (Latvia) | Martins Lavrovs | L | LW/RW | 2018 | Tukums, Latvia |
| 31 | (France) | Valentin Michel | R | RW | 2016 | Compiègne, France |
| 91 | (Latvia) | Arturs Mickevics | R | RW/LW | 2016 | Talsi, Latvia |
| 60 | (France) | Pierre Robert | L | C | 2018 | Grenoble, France |
| 16 | (Canada) | Ryan Verbeek | L | C/LW | 2018 | Kingston, Canada |

== Past Players ==
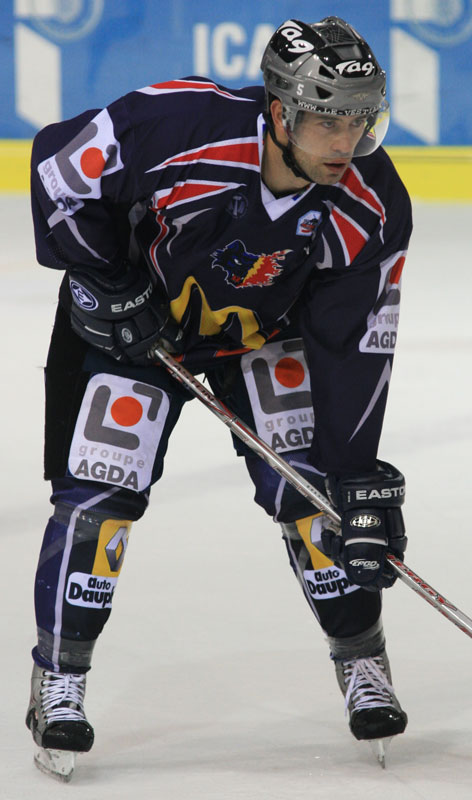
Baptiste Amar

LHC alumni have played in the North American National Hockey League (NHL), the French Ligue Magnus and on French Olympic teams.

Among the most notable of LHC past-players are:

- (France) Baptiste Amar – 2002 French Olympic team
- (Canada) / (France) Roger Dubé – 1998 French Olympic team
- (Canada) / (France) Jean-Marc Gaulin – Right-wing for the NHL's Quebec Nordiques 1982–87
- Laurent Meunier – Captain of France national team, 2002 French Olympic team, two-time Ligue Magnus MVP
- (Poland) / (France) André Svitac – 1992 French Olympic team

== LHC Junior Squads ==
As well as the senior team the LHC competes in six levels of junior ice hockey.

=== LHC Moustiques ===
A team for players aged less than 9 years.

=== LHC Poussins ===
A team for players aged under 11 years. The team is coached by LHC player Geoffrey Paillet.

=== LHC Benjamins ===
A team for players aged under 13 years. The team is coached by LHC player Pascal Margerit.

=== LHC Minimes ===
Two teams – Minimes Excellence and Minime Elite – for players aged under 15 years.

=== LHC Cadets ===
A team for players aged under 18 years.

== Mascot, Nickname and Supporters ==
The official mascot of the LHC is Pepito the Lion. Always in attendance at home games, Pepito wears a Lyon hockey jersey and a straw hat. The nickname of the LHC is 'The Lions' and relates to the symbol of city of Lyon.

The most vocal supporters of the LHC are the Lions Gones. This group of fans are similar to football ultras and share their name with the Bad Gones of the city's Olympique Lyonnais football team.

According to the Tribune de Lyon, despite being a Division 2 team the LHC attracts the highest crowds of any hockey team in France in any league, save for Ligue Magnus teams Grenoble and Rouen.

== Notes ==
1.Crunch, Senators to hold camp in Lyon
2.Historique du Lyon Hockey Club.
3.Historique du Lyon Hockey Club.
4.Historique du Lyon Hockey Club.
5.Historique du Lyon Hockey Club.
6.Historique du Lyon Hockey Club.
7.Historique du Lyon Hockey Club.
8.FFHG Division 2 2008–2009 Teams.
9.Les Lions dans la douleur.
10.Et de deux pour les Lions.
11.A l'image d'un derby.
12.Strict minimum pour les Lions.
13.Première défaite des Lions.
14.Avec la manière.
15.FFHG Division 2.
16.Lyon Hockey Club: Nos Partenaires.
17.Lyon Hockey Club: Nos Partenaires.
18.Patinoire Charlemagne.
19.Moustiques.
20.LHC Poussins.
21.LHC Benjamins.
22.LHC Minimes.
23.LHC Cadets.
24.LHC Espoirs.
