= Anglet Hormadi Élite =

Anglet hormadi élite
- City: Anglet, France
- League: Ligue Magnus
- Founded: 1969
- Home arena: Patinoire de la Barre
- Colours: Green, white, red
- General manager: Xavier Daramy
- Head coach: Marc LeFebvre
- Captain: Arnaud Faure

Franchise history
- 1970–1996: Hockeyeurs des Sables
- 1996–2011: Orques d'Anglet
- 2011–present: Hormadi

Anglet Hormadi Pays Basque is an ice hockey team in Anglet, France. They play in the Ligue Magnus, the highest level of ice hockey in France.

The club was runner-up (Ligue Magnus) in 2001.

Due to Anglet's location in the French Basque Country, they also participated in the Superliga Espanola de Hockey Hielo, the top level Spanish league in 2007–08 and 2008–09.

== History ==
Anglet Hormadi Élite was founded in 1969 and first took part in the Ligue Magnus, the top level French league, in the 1996–97 season. During the 1994–95 NHL Lockout, Brian Propp joined Hormadi. In the 2000–01 season, the club lost in the final of the Ligue Magnus. Two years later Anglet made it to the final of the Coupe de France, but were defeated.

After Anglet Hormadi Élite was relegated from the Ligue Magnus after the 2006–07 season, they dropped all the way to FFHG Division 3, the lowest level of French ice hockey, due to lack of funds. In the 2007–08 season, they also joined the Superliga Espanola de Hockey Hielo, the highest level of Spanish ice hockey. In their first season in Spain, they finished as runner-up in the championship, and lost in the semifinal of the Copa del Rey.

They won the FFHG Division 3 in 2009 and the FFHG Division 2 in 2010, and participated in the FFHG Division 1 from 2010 to 2018. In 2018 Homadi Anglet gained promotion to the Ligue Magnus for the first time in 12 years, after they defeated Albatros de Brest in the FFHG Division 1 playoff finals.

== Current roster ==
Updated November 5 2024.

No.	Nat	Player	Pos	S/G	Age	Acquired	Birthplace
14	(France)	Hugo Baron	F	L	24	2020	Tarbes, France
29	(United States)	Brent Beaudoin	C	L	30	2024	Londonderry, New Hampshire, United States
44	(Canada)	Connor Blake	D	R	27	2024	Calgary, Alberta, Canada
22	(France)	Robin Bouney	F	L	22	2024	Bayonne, France
94	(France)	Raphaël Cacheux	C	L	21	2024	Mont-Saint-Aignan, France
61	(France)	Isaac Charpentier	G	L	27	2024	Epinal, France
21	(Canada)	Vincent Deslauriers	RW	R	29	2023	Sainte-Anne-des-Plaines, Quebec, Canada
46	(Canada)	Sam Dunn (A)	D	R	28	2023	Bewdley, Ontario, Canada
13	(France)	Ivan Esipov	D	L	24	2024	Moscow, Russia
74	(France)	Jamie Eyre	D	L	21	2024	Morzine, France
6	(France)	Arnaud Faure (C)	D	L	30	2023	Grenoble, France
15	(France)	Théo Frémond	D	L	24	2022	Bayonne, France
19	(France)	Fabien Kazarine (A)	LW	L	31	2022	Compiègne, France
96	(France)	Emilien Lochu	D	L	22	2024	Paris, France
24	(France)	Baptiste Manciot	D	R	23	2022	Bordeaux, France
12	(France)	Julien Munoz	RW	R	28	2024	Grenoble, France
27	(Russia)	Alexei Polodyan	LW	L	28	2024	Saint Petersburg, Russia
71	(United States)	Craig Puffer	LW	L	31	2023	Greenwich, Connecticut, United States
86	(France)	Timothé Quattrone	LW	L	25	2024	Annecy, France
18	(France)	Victor Ranger	C	R	27	2020	Epinal, France
20	(France)	Samuel Rousseau	C	L	25	2023	Strasbourg, France
28	(Russia)	Andrei Rychagov	C	L	44	2024	Samara, Russian SFSR, Soviet Union
37	(United States)	Dylan St. Cyr	G	L	27	2023	Las Vegas, Nevada, United States

== Award in the Ligue Magnus ==
- Jean-Pierre Graff Trophy : 2002 (Xavier Daramy)

== Captains ==
- Jacques Dorotte
- Tony Rojo
- Didier Barace
- Jacques Bareyre
- Jean-Michel Benac
- Jean-Yves Decock
- Lionel Bilbao
- 2001–2002 Robert Ouellet
- 2002–2004 Jean-Christophe Filippin
- 2004–2017 Xavier Daramy
- 2018-2020, 2022–2023 Thomas Decock
- 2021–2022 Mathieu Pons
- 2024–pres. Arnaud Faure

== Achievements ==
=== France ===
- Ligue Magnus runner-up: 2001
- FFHG Division 1 champion: 1997, 2017
- FFHG Division 2 champion: 2010
- FFHG Division 3 champion: 2009
- Coupe de France runner-up: 2003

=== Spain ===
- Spanish runner-up: 2008.

== Notable players ==
- Robert Ouellet
- Éric Raymond
- Denis Perez
- Olivier Dimet
- Roberto Baldris
- Marko Lapinkoski
- Stanislas Solaux
- Lionel Bilbao
- David Dostal
- Michał Garbocz
- Vesa Lahtinen
- Brian Propp
- Slavomir Vorobel
- Serge Poudrier
- Eddy Ferhi
- Sebastian Ylönen
- Dominique Ducharme

== Notable coaches ==
- Karlos Gordovil
- Olivier Dimet
- Heikki Leime
- Marc LeFebvre
