= Hockey Club de Reims =

Flammes bleues de Reims
- City: Reims, France
- Founded: 1969
- Folded: 2002
- Home arena: Bocquaine Ice Rink
- Colours: Blue, White

Hockey Club de Reims was an ice hockey team in Reims, France. The club existed from 1969 to 2002. They played in the Nationale B and Nationale C from their founding in 1969 until they were promoted to the Ligue Magnus in 1990. Reims participated in the top level of French hockey from 1990 until they folded in 2002, winning the league title in 2000 and 2002.

== Achievements ==
- Ligue Magnus champion (2) : 2000, 2002.
