= Albert Hassler Trophy =

French ice hockey trophy

The Albert Hassler Trophy (French: Trophée Albert Hassler) has been awarded to the most valuable French player in the Ligue Magnus since 1978. It is named after Albert Hassler, a French ice hockey player who played during the 1920s and 1930s.

== Winners ==
Year	Player	Team
1977–78	Jean Vassieux	Ours de Villard-de-Lans
1978–79	Philippe Rey	Chamonix Hockey Club
1979–80	Bernard Le Blond	Brûleurs de Loups de Grenoble
1980–81	Philippe Treille	Brûleurs de Loups de Grenoble
1981–82	Daniel Maric	Brûleurs de Loups de Grenoble
1982–83	Christophe Ville	Aigles de Saint Gervais
1983–84	Christophe Ville	Aigles de Saint Gervais
1984–85	Thierry Chaix; Yves Crettenand	Gap Hockey Club; Chamonix Hockey Club
1985–86	Stéphane Botteri	Aigles de Saint Gervais
1986–87	Christian Pouget	Gap Hockey Club
1987–88	Pierre Pousse	Mont-Blanc HC
1988–89	Yves Crettenand	Dragons de Rouen
1989–90	Philippe Bozon	Brûleurs de Loups de Grenoble
1990–91	Christophe Ville	Brûleurs de Loups de Grenoble
1991–92	Christophe Ville	Chamonix Hockey Club
1992–93	Pierre Pousse	Gothiques d'Amiens
1993–94	Franck Saunier	Dragons de Rouen
1994–95	Christian Pouget	Chamonix Hockey Club
1995–96	Arnaud Briand	Reims Champagne Hockey
1996–97	Arnaud Briand	Reims Champagne Hockey
1997–98	Cristobal Huet	Brûleurs de Loups de Grenoble
1998–99	Maurice Rozenthal	Gothiques d'Amiens
1999–2000	Maurice Rozenthal	Gothiques d'Amiens
2000–01	Maurice Rozenthal	Gothiques d'Amiens
2001–02	Christian Pouget	Brûleurs de Loups de Grenoble
2002–03	Laurent Gras	Gothiques d'Amiens
2003–04	Laurent Meunier	Brûleurs de Loups de Grenoble
2004–05	Laurent Meunier	Brûleurs de Loups de Grenoble
2005–06	Maurice Rozenthal	Ours de Villard-de-Lans
2006–07	Jonathan Zwikel	Pingouins de Morzine-Avoriaz
2007–08	Baptiste Amar	Brûleurs de Loups de Grenoble
2008–09	Baptiste Amar; Julien Desrosiers	Brûleurs de Loups de Grenoble; Diables Rouges de Briançon
2009–10	Damien Fleury	Brûleurs de Loups de Grenoble
2010–11	Kevin Hecquefeuille	Gothiques d'Amiens
2011–12	Anthony Guttig	Ducs de Dijon
2012–13	Florian Hardy	Ducs d'Angers
2013–14	Nicolas Ritz	Ducs de Dijon
2014–15	Julien Desrosiers	Dragons de Rouen
2015–16	Anthony Rech; Yorick Treille	Rapaces de Gap; Dragons de Rouen
2016–17	Anthony Rech	Rapaces de Gap
2017–18	Julien Correia	LHC Les Lions
2018–19	Guillaume Leclerc	Brûleurs de Loups
2019–20	Damien Fleury	Brûleurs de Loups
2020–21	Anthony Guttig	Dragons de Rouen
2021–22	Damien Fleury	Brûleurs de Loups
2022–23	Sacha Treille	Brûleurs de Loups de Grenoble
2023–24	Anthony Rech	Dragons de Rouen
2024–25	Anthony Rech	Dragons de Rouen
2025–26	Anthony Rech	Dragons de Rouen
