= Jean Ferrand Trophy =

Hockey award

The Jean Ferrand Trophy (French: Trophée Jean Ferrand) has been awarded to the best goaltender in the Ligue Magnus since 1978. It is named after Jean Ferrand, a former French ice hockey goaltender.

== Winners ==
Season	Player	Nationality	Team
1977–78	Bernard Cal	(France)	Rapaces de Gap
1978–79	Bernard Deschamps	(France)	Chamonix Hockey Club
1979–80	Bernard Deschamps (2)	(France)	Chamonix Hockey Club
1980–81	Bernard Deschamps (3)	(France)	Chamonix Hockey Club
1981–82	Daniel Maric	(France)	Brûleurs de Loups de Grenoble
1982–83	Charles Thillien	(France)	ASG Tours
1983–84	Patrick Foliot	(France)	Club des Sports de Megève
1984–85	Frédéric Malletroit	(France)	Gothiques d'Amiens
1985–86	Frédéric Malletroit (2)	(France)	Gothiques d'Amiens
1986–87	Patrick Foliot	(France)	Mont-Blanc HC
1987–88	Petri Ylönen	(Finland) (France)	Diables Rouges de Briançon
1988–89	Petri Ylönen (2)	(Finland) (France)	Dragons de Rouen
1989–90	Jean-Marc Djian	(France)	Brûleurs de Loups de Grenoble
1990–91	Jean-Marc Djian (2); Corrado Micalef	(France) (Canada) (Italy)	Brûleurs de Loups de Grenoble; Diables Rouges de Briançon
1991–92	Petri Ylönen (3)	(Finland) (France)	Dragons de Rouen
1992–93	Petri Ylönen (4)	(Finland) (France)	Dragons de Rouen
1993–94	Petri Ylönen (5)	(Finland) (France)	Dragons de Rouen
1994–95	Antoine Mindjimba	(France)	Gothiques d'Amiens
1995–96	Fabrice Lhenry	(France)	Chamonix Hockey Club
1996–97	Cristobal Huet	(France)	Brûleurs de Loups de Grenoble
1997–98	Cristobal Huet (2)	(France)	Brûleurs de Loups de Grenoble
1998–99	Mika Pietilä	(Finland)	Reims Champagne Hockey
1999–2000	Mika Pietilä (2)	(Finland)	Reims Champagne Hockey
2000–01	Phil Groeneveld	(Canada) (Netherlands)	Dragons de Rouen
2001–02	Fabrice Lhenry	(France)	Scorpions de Mulhouse
2002–03	Fabrice Lhenry (2)	(France)	Scorpions de Mulhouse
2003–04	Fabrice Lhenry (3)	(France)	Scorpions de Mulhouse
2004–05	Fabrice Lhenry (4)	(France)	Scorpions de Mulhouse
2005–06	Ramón Sopko	(Slovakia)	Dragons de Rouen
2006–07	Eddy Ferhi	(France)	Brûleurs de Loups de Grenoble
2007–08	Eddy Ferhi (2)	(France)	Brûleurs de Loups de Grenoble
2008–09	Tommi Satosaari	(Finland)	Diables Rouges de Briançon
2009–10	Ramón Sopko (2)	(Slovakia)	Diables Rouges de Briançon
2010–11	Ronan Quemener; Billy Thompson	(France) (Canada)	Rapaces de Gap; Gothiques d'Amiens
2011–12	Florian Hardy	(France)	Chamonix Hockey Club
2012–13	Florian Hardy (2)	(France)	Ducs d'Angers
2013–14	Jeff Lerg	(United States)	Ours de Villard-de-Lans
2014–15	Jean-Sébastien Aubin	(Canada)	Ducs d'Angers
2015–16	Andrej Hočevar	(Slovenia)	Gamyo d'Épinal
2016–17	Matija Pintarič	(Slovenia)	LHC Les Lions
2017–18	Henri-Corentin Buysse	(France)	Gothiques d'Amiens
2018–19	Matija Pintarič	(Slovenia)	Dragons de Rouen
2019–20	Matija Pintarič (2)	(Slovenia)	Dragons de Rouen
2020–21	Quentin Papillon	(France)	Scorpions de Mulhouse
2021–22	Matija Pintarič (3)	(Slovenia)	Dragons de Rouen
2022–23	Julian Junca	(France)	Rapaces de Gap
2023–24	Marek Čiliak	(Slovakia)	Spartiates de Marseille
2024–25	Quentin Papillon (2)	(France)	Boxers de Bordeaux
2025–26	Griffen Outhouse	(Canada)	Diables Rouges de Briançon
