= French Ice Hockey Hall of Fame =

Museum in Haute-Savoie, France

The French Ice Hockey Hall of Fame, was founded in 2008 by the French Ice Hockey Federation, in the commune of Chamonix, on the occasion of the centenary of the French Championship. The Hall serves to honor players, coaches, referees, and other individuals who have contributed to the sport of ice hockey in France.

== Members ==
=== 2008 ===
- Philippe Bozon
- Jean Ferrand
- Jacques Lacarrière
- Pete Laliberté
- Louis Magnus
- Chamonix Hockey Club

=== 2009 ===
- Albert Hassler
- Daniel Huillier
- Henri Lafit
- Calixte Pianfetti
- Charles Ramsay
- Hockey Club de Cergy-Pontoise

=== 2010 ===
- Camil Gélinas
- Claude Pourtanel
- Léon Quaglia
- Antoine Richer
- Association pour la promotion du hockey

=== 2011 ===
- Bernard Deschamps
- Philippe Lacarrière
- Jean Tarenberque
- Christophe Ville
- Cercle des patineurs de Paris

=== 2012 ===
- Alain Bozon
- Albert Fontaine
- Angela Lezziero
- Marie-Claude Raffoux
- Famille Claret

=== 2013 ===
- Joseph Cochet
- Marcel Guadaloppa
- Gilbert Itzicsohn
- Jean-Claude Sozzi
- Jean Vassieux

=== 2014 ===
- Jean Jullien
- Charles Libberman
- André Peloffy
- Patrice Purtanel

=== 2015 ===
- Philippe Rey
- Christian Pouget
- Daniel Maric
- Albert Kimmerling
- Leo Mounier

=== 2016 ===
- André Vuillermet
- Louis Smaniotto
- Thierry Monier
- Jean–Louis Millon
- Tristan Alric

=== 2017 ===
- Paul Lang
- Arnaud Briand
- Alain Mazza
- Corrin Dogemont

== See also ==
- IIHF Hall of Fame
