= 2021–22 Ligue Magnus season =

2021–22 Ligue Magnus
- League: Ligue Magnus
- Sport: Ice hockey
- Duration: Regular season 21 September 2021 – 4 March 2022; Playoffs; 8 March 2022 – 3 April 2022; Finals; 5 April 2022 – 13 April 2022
- Teams: 12

Regular season
- Best record: Brûleurs de Loups

Playoffs

Finals
- Champions: Brûleurs de Loups (8th title)
- Runners-up: Ducs d'Angers

Ligue Magnus seasons
- ← 2020–21 2022–23 →

The 2021–22 Ligue Magnus season was the 101st season of the Ligue Magnus, the top level of ice hockey in France.

== Teams ==
Ligue Magnus team map

Team	City	Arena	Founded
Gothiques d'Amiens	Amiens	Coliséum	1967
Ducs d'Angers	Angers	IceParc	1982
Anglet Hormadi	Anglet	Patinoire de la Barre	1969
Boxers de Bordeaux	Bordeaux	Patinoire de Mériadeck	1999
Diables Rouges de Briançon	Briançon	Patinoire René Froger	1934
Jokers de Cergy-Pontoise	Cergy-Pontoise	Aren'Ice	1981
Pionniers de Chamonix Mont-Blanc	Chamonix	Centre Sportif Richard Bozon	2016
Rapaces de Gap	Gap	Alp'Arena	1937
Brûleurs de Loups	Grenoble	Patinoire Pole Sud	1963
Scorpions de Mulhouse	Mulhouse	Patinoire de l'Illberg	2005
Aigles de Nice	Nice	Patinoire Jean Bouin	1969
Dragons de Rouen	Rouen	Patinoire de l'Île Lacroix	1982

== Regular season ==
Pos	Team	Pld	W	OTW	OTL	L	GF	GA	GD	Pts	Qualification
1	Brûleurs de Loups	44	34	1	5	4	200	85	+115	109	Qualification to Play-offs
2	Ducs d'Angers	44	29	4	1	10	157	92	+65	96	Qualification to Play-offs
3	Dragons de Rouen	44	28	4	2	10	171	106	+65	95	Qualification to Play-offs
4	Jokers de Cergy-Pontoise	44	25	1	4	14	177	139	+38	81	Qualification to Play-offs
5	Gothiques d'Amiens	44	20	7	1	16	151	129	+22	75	Qualification to Play-offs
6	Rapaces de Gap	44	18	3	3	20	136	142	−6	63	Qualification to Play-offs
7	Pionniers de Chamonix Mont-Blanc	44	13	3	8	20	131	162	−31	53	Qualification to Play-offs
8	Boxers de Bordeaux	44	11	6	4	23	98	147	−49	49	Qualification to Play-offs
9	Aigles de Nice	44	12	5	2	25	116	161	−45	48	Qualification to Play-out
10	Anglet Hormadi	44	9	6	5	24	116	156	−40	43	Qualification to Play-out
11	Scorpions de Mulhouse (Note: Scorpions were deprived 6 points by the decision of the Federation.)	44	12	3	6	23	120	162	−42	42	Qualification to Play-out
12	Diables Rouges de Briançon	44	6	4	6	28	101	193	−92	32	Qualification to Play-out

Source: Ligue Magnus
Rules for classification: 1) Points; 2) Head-to-head points.

=== Statistics ===
==== Scoring leaders ====
The following players led the league in points, at the conclusion of matches played on 19 February 2022.

Player	Team	GP	G	A	Pts	+/–	PIM
(Canada) Nicolas Deschamps	Brûleurs de Loups	38	15	46	61	+36	30
(France) Damien Fleury	Brûleurs de Loups	38	27	33	60	+31	53
(France) Pierre-Charles Hordelalay	Jokers de Cergy-Pontoise	37	24	27	51	+8	30
(Canada) Phil Marinaccio	Pionniers de Chamonix Mont-Blanc	35	29	20	49	+17	30
(United States) Dennis Kearney	Jokers de Cergy-Pontoise	35	22	26	48	+25	55
(Canada) Philippe Halley	Ducs d'Angers	35	22	21	43	+27	14
(Canada) Tommy Giroux	Ducs d'Angers	36	15	28	43	+24	4
(Canada) Matthew Pistilli	Scorpions de Mulhouse	39	13	29	42	-7	20
(France) Aurélien Dair	Brûleurs de Loups	37	15	24	39	+26	20
(Slovakia) Rudolf Huna	Diables Rouges de Briançon	38	21	17	38	-3	6

==== Leading goaltenders ====
The following goaltenders led the league in goals against average, provided that they have played at least 70% of their team's minutes, at the conclusion of matches played on 19 February 2022.

Player	Team	GP	TOI	W	L	GA	SO	SV%	GAA
(Czech Republic) Jakub Štěpánek	Brûleurs de Loups	37	1712:52	24	4	48	4	93.04%	1.66
(Canada) Evan Cowley	Ducs d'Angers	35	1857:55	21	8	59	2	92.29%	1.90
(Slovenia) Matija Pintarič	Dragons de Rouen	35	1991:38	24	8	65	4	93.18%	1.97
(France) Henri-Corentin Buysse	Gothiques d'Amiens	32	1686:44	17	7	64	2	92.37%	2.21
(France) Clément Fouquerel	Boxers de Bordeaux	37	1588:29	12	13	65	1	92.47%	2.41

== Playoffs ==
=== Bracket ===
Quarterfinals
1	Brûleurs de Loups	4
8	Boxers de Bordeaux	0
4	Jokers de Cergy-Pontoise	4
5	Gothiques d'Amiens	2
2	Ducs d'Angers	4
7	Pionniers de Chamonix Mont-Blanc	0
3	Dragons de Rouen	4
6	Rapaces de Gap	2

Semifinals
1	Brûleurs de Loups	4
4	Jokers de Cergy-Pontoise	1
2	Ducs d'Angers	4
3	Dragons de Rouen	3

Finals
1	Brûleurs de Loups	4
2	Ducs d'Angers	1

=== Quarterfinals ===
Brûleurs de Loups – Boxers de Bordeaux 4-0
11.03.2022	Brûleurs de Loups	Boxers de Bordeaux	6-1
12.03.2022	Brûleurs de Loups	Boxers de Bordeaux	5-0
14.03.2022	Boxers de Bordeaux	Brûleurs de Loups	1-5
15.03.2022	Boxers de Bordeaux	Brûleurs de Loups	2-3
Brûleurs de Loups won the series 4–0

Ducs d'Angers – Pionniers de Chamonix Mont-Blanc 4-0
11.03.2022	Ducs d'Angers	Pionniers de Chamonix Mont-Blanc	5-3
12.03.2022	Ducs d'Angers	Pionniers de Chamonix Mont-Blanc	5-1
14.03.2022	Pionniers de Chamonix Mont-Blanc	Ducs d'Angers	0-6
15.03.2022	Pionniers de Chamonix Mont-Blanc	Ducs d'Angers	1-3
Ducs d'Angers won the series 4–0

Jokers de Cergy-Pontoise – Gothiques d'Amiens 4-2
11.03.2022	Jokers de Cergy-Pontoise	Gothiques d'Amiens	5-4 OT
12.03.2022	Jokers de Cergy-Pontoise	Gothiques d'Amiens	3-2
14.03.2022	Gothiques d'Amiens	Jokers de Cergy-Pontoise	2-1
15.03.2022	Gothiques d'Amiens	Jokers de Cergy-Pontoise	6-2
17.03.2022	Jokers de Cergy-Pontoise	Gothiques d'Amiens	3-4 OT
19.03.2022	Gothiques d'Amiens	Jokers de Cergy-Pontoise	4-3
Jokers de Cergy-Pontoise won the series 4–2

Dragons de Rouen – Rapaces de Gap 4-2
11.03.2022	Dragons de Rouen	Rapaces de Gap	2-1
12.03.2022	Dragons de Rouen	Rapaces de Gap	4-1
14.03.2022	Rapaces de Gap	Dragons de Rouen	3-2
15.03.2022	Rapaces de Gap	Dragons de Rouen	4-1
17.03.2022	Dragons de Rouen	Rapaces de Gap	1-2 OT
19.03.2022	Rapaces de Gap	Dragons de Rouen	6-0
Dragons de Rouen won the series 4–2

=== Semifinals ===
Brûleurs de Loups – Jokers de Cergy-Pontoise 4-1
23.03.2022	Brûleurs de Loups	Jokers de Cergy-Pontoise	2-1 OT
24.03.2022	Brûleurs de Loups	Jokers de Cergy-Pontoise	7-2
26.03.2022	Jokers de Cergy-Pontoise	Brûleurs de Loups	4-2
27.03.2022	Jokers de Cergy-Pontoise	Brûleurs de Loups	2-5
29.03.2022	Brûleurs de Loups	Jokers de Cergy-Pontoise	7-0
Brûleurs de Loups won the series 4-1

Ducs d'Angers – Dragons de Rouen 4-3
23.03.2022	Ducs d'Angers	Dragons de Rouen	2-3
24.03.2022	Ducs d'Angers	Dragons de Rouen	4-1
26.03.2022	Dragons de Rouen	Ducs d'Angers	1-2
27.03.2022	Dragons de Rouen	Ducs d'Angers	2-0
29.03.2022	Ducs d'Angers	Dragons de Rouen	3-4 OT
31.03.2022	Dragons de Rouen	Ducs d'Angers	1-4
02.04.2022	Ducs d'Angers	Dragons de Rouen	7-1
Ducs d'Angers won the series 4-3

=== Finals ===
5 April 2022; 20:15 (UTC+2)	Brûleurs de Loups	5–2 (1–0, 1–1, 3–1) score in the series: 1–0	Ducs d'Angers	Patinoire Polesud, Grenoble; Attendance: 4,208

Game reference

Jakub Štěpánek
Goalies
Evan Cowley
Referees:
Geoffrey Barcelo
Jérémy Rauline
Linesmen:
Gwilherm Margry
Nicolas Constantineau

Treille (Champagne, A. Dair) (SH1) - 06:54	1–0
Tuppurainen (Deschamps) - 21:01	2–0
	2–1	24:58 - Ritz (Llorca, Torquato)
Tuppurainen (Fleury, Jalasvaara) - 41:03	3–1
	3–2	45:02 - Farnier (Sarliève, Coulombe)
Munoz (Koudri, Deschamps) - 52:14	4–2
Tuppurainen - 58:11	5–2

6 April 2022; 20:15 (UTC+2)	Brûleurs de Loups	1–3 (1–1, 0–0, 0–2) score in the series: 1–1	Ducs d'Angers	Patinoire Polesud, Grenoble; Attendance: 4,208

Game reference

Jakub Štěpánek
Goalies
Evan Cowley
Referees:
Nicolas Barbez
Nicolas Cregut
Linesmen:
Jérémie Douchy
Clément Goncalves

	0–1	08:12 - Bouvet
Valier (F. Dair, Koudri) - 12:59	1–1
	1–2	42:23 - Halley (Giroux)
	1–3	45:55 - Halley (Smith, Dusseau)

9 April 2022; 18:00 (UTC+2)	Ducs d'Angers	4–5 GWS (1–3, 3–0, 0–1) (OT: 0–0) (SO: 0–1) score in the series: 1–2	Brûleurs de Loups	Angers IceParc, Angers; Attendance: 3,586

Game reference

Evan Cowley
Goalies
Jakub Štěpánek
Referees:
Damien Bliek
Pierre Dehaen
Linesmen:
Nicolas Constantineau
Gwilherm Margry

	0–1	06:55 - Fleury
	0–2	10:32 - Fabre
	0–3	14:17 - Valier (Munoz, Bisaillon)
Giroux (Gaborit) - 18:54	1–3
Farnier - 31:07	2–3
Bouvet (Halley, Llorca) - 31:57	3–3
Manning (Llorca) (PP1) - 39:43	4–3
	4–4	46:17 - Deschamps (Poukkula, Shearer Hardy)

Coulombe (miss)
Giroux (miss)
Bouvet
Halley
Bouchard
Bouchard (miss)
Shootout
Treille
(miss) Shearer Hardy
Fabre
Champagne
(miss) Tuppurainen
Treille

10 April 2022; 20:30 (UTC+2)	Ducs d'Angers	2–3 GWS (0–1, 0–0, 2–1) (OT: 0–0) (SO: 0–1) score in the series: 1–3	Brûleurs de Loups	Angers IceParc, Angers; Attendance: 3,586

Game reference

Evan Cowley
Goalies
Jakub Štěpánek
Referees:
Jérémy Rauline
Geoffrey Barcelo
Linesmen:
Clément Goncalves
Jérémie Douchy

	0–1	00:27 - Fabre (Treille, Champagne)
Manavian (Llorca, Halley) - 46:00	1–1
	1–2	51:56 - Poukkula (Deschamps)
Bouchard (Torquato, Sarliève) - 52:39	2–2

Giroux (miss)
Sarliève (miss)
Halley
Bouchard (miss)
Shootout
(miss) Tuppurainen
Deschamps
Treille
Fabre

13 April 2022; 21:30 (UTC+2)	Brûleurs de Loups	5–1 (1–1, 1–0, 3–0) score in the series: 4–1	Ducs d'Angers	Patinoire Polesud, Grenoble; Attendance: 4,208

Game reference

Jakub Štěpánek
Goalies
Evan Cowley
Referees:
Damien Bliek
Pierre Dehaen
Linesmen:
Nicolas Constantineau
Clément Goncalves

	0–1	10:34 - Bouvet (Giroux, Halley)
Deschamps - 13:47	1–1
Koudri (Valier) - 37:38	2–1
Treille (Tuppurainen, Fleury) (PP1) - 40:21	3–1
Deschamps (A. Dair) - 48:49	4–1
Champagne (Jalasvaara) (SH1) - 55:22	5–1

== Play-out ==
Pos	Team	Pld	W	OTW	OTL	L	GF	GA	GD	Pts	Relegation
1	Aigles de Nice	6	2	0	0	4	18	28	−10	54	
2	Anglet Hormadi	6	3	0	1	2	23	20	+3	53	
3	Scorpions de Mulhouse	6	3	0	0	3	25	24	+1	51	
4	Diables Rouges de Briançon	6	3	1	0	2	23	17	+6	43	Relegation to FFHG Division 1

Source: eurohockey.com
Rules for classification: 1) Points; 2) Head-to-head points.

Diables Rouges de Briançon is relegated, unless the Division 1 champion does not apply for the Magnus League promotion.

== Final rankings ==
Gold medal	Brûleurs de Loups
Silver medal	Ducs d'Angers
Bronze medal	Dragons de Rouen
4	Jokers de Cergy-Pontoise
5	Gothiques d'Amiens
6	Rapaces de Gap
7	Pionniers de Chamonix Mont-Blanc
8	Boxers de Bordeaux
9	Aigles de Nice
10	Anglet Hormadi
11	Scorpions de Mulhouse
12	Diables Rouges de Briançon
