= 1971–72 1re série season =

French professional ice hockey season

The 1971–72 1re série season was the 51st season of the 1re série, the top level of ice hockey in France. 11 teams participated in the league, and Chamonix Hockey Club won their 27th league title.

== First round ==
=== Paris-Nord Group ===
	Club	GP	W	T	L	GF	GA	Pts
1.	Viry-Châtillon Essonne Hockey	6	6	0	0	63	14	18
2.	Français Volants	6	2	1	3	35	29	11
3.	CG Poitiers	6	2	0	4	37	68	10
4.	CPM Croix	6	1	1	4	26	50	9

(Athletic Club de Boulogne Billancourt forfeited the entire season after only one game, an 8-3 win over CG Poitiers.)

=== Alpes-Provence Group ===
	Club	GP	W	T	L	GF	GA	Pts
1.	Chamonix Hockey Club	12	12	0	0	107	16	36
2.	Sporting Hockey Club Saint Gervais	12	8	1	3	69	29	29
3.	Gap Hockey Club	12	7	0	5	74	55	26
4.	Ours de Villard-de-Lans	12	6	1	5	54	33	25
5.	Club des Sports de Megève	12	6	0	6	48	46	24
6.	CSG Grenoble	12	2	0	10	23	83	16
7.	Diables Rouges de Briançon	12	0	0	12	14	127	12

=== Qualification game for final round ===
- Gap Hockey Club - Français Volants 6:3

== Second round ==
=== Final round ===
	Club	GP	W	T	L	GF	GA	Pts
1.	Chamonix Hockey Club	6	6	0	0	43	7	18
2.	Gap Hockey Club	6	3	0	3	22	37	12
3.	Viry-Châtillon Essonne Hockey	5	2	0	3	21	22	9
4.	Sporting Hockey Club Saint Gervais	5	0	0	5	7	27	5

=== 5th-8th place ===
	Club	GP	W	T	L	GF	GA	Pts
5.	Ours de Villard-de-Lans	3	3	0	0	28	6	6
6.	Club des Sports de Megève	6	3	0	3	37	25	6
7.	Français Volants	3	1	0	2	8	22	2
8.	CG Poitiers	4	1	0	3	18	38	2
