= Vassieux =

Vassieux may refer to:

- Vassieux-en-Vercors, a municipality in the department of Drôme, France
- Vassieux (quarter), a neighborhood in Caluire-et-Cuire, France
- Jean Vassieux (1949-2021), a former ice hockey player in the French Ice Hockey Hall of Fame
