= Lacarrière =

Lacarrière is a surname. Notable people with the surname include:

- Jacques Lacarrière (1925–2005), French writer
- Jacques Lacarrière (ice hockey) (1906–2005), French ice hockey player
- Philippe Lacarrière (born 1938), French ice hockey player and executive
- Robert Lacarrière (1898–1970), French sailor
