= Dylan Fabre =

French ice hockey player (born 2000)

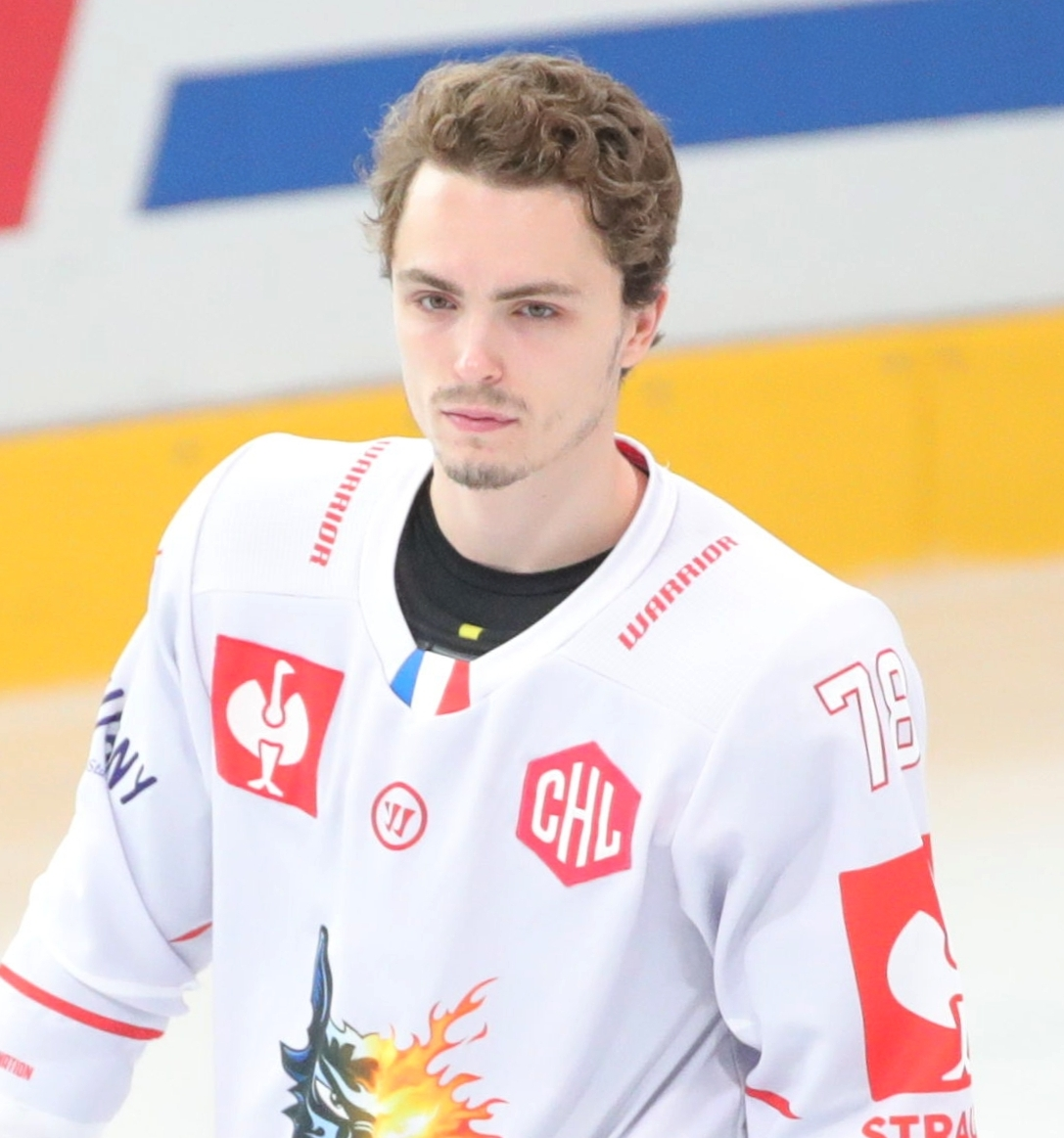
- Fabre in 2022
- Born: November 10, 2000 (age 25) Grenoble, France
- Height: 178 cm (5 ft 10 in)
- Weight: 80 kg (176 lb; 12 st 8 lb)
- Position: Winger
- Shoots: Left
- Liiga team Former teams: HC Ässät Pori; Brûleurs de Loups
- National team: France
- Playing career: 2017–present

Dylan Fabre (born 10 November 2000) is a French professional ice hockey player who is a winger for HC Ässät Pori of the Liiga. Internationally, Fabre represents France. Fabre started his professional career in the Ligue Magnus, France's top-level league, playing for Brûleurs de Loups, which is also his youth club.

== Playing career ==
=== Junior ===
Fabre started ice hockey in the youth organization of Brûleurs de Loups. Fabre represented Brûleurs de Loups as a 12-year-old in the Quebec International Pee-Wee Hockey Tournament in the 2012–13 season. Fabre played four games and scored a total of nine points.

During the 2014–15 season, Fabre played for Brûleurs de Loups U18 II team in the French U18 3rd division. Fabre only played three games, which were all playoff games. In the following season, Fabre represented Brûleurs de Loups in the U18 first team for a total of six regular season games and five playoff games. In total, Fabre scored 13 points.

In Fabre's last fully junior season (2016–17), he played for Brûleurs de Loups U17 for 20 games where he tallied 34 points. Fabre also represented Brûleurs de Loups U20 in five games, scoring 3 points.

=== Professional ===
==== Brûleurs de Loups (2017–2023) ====
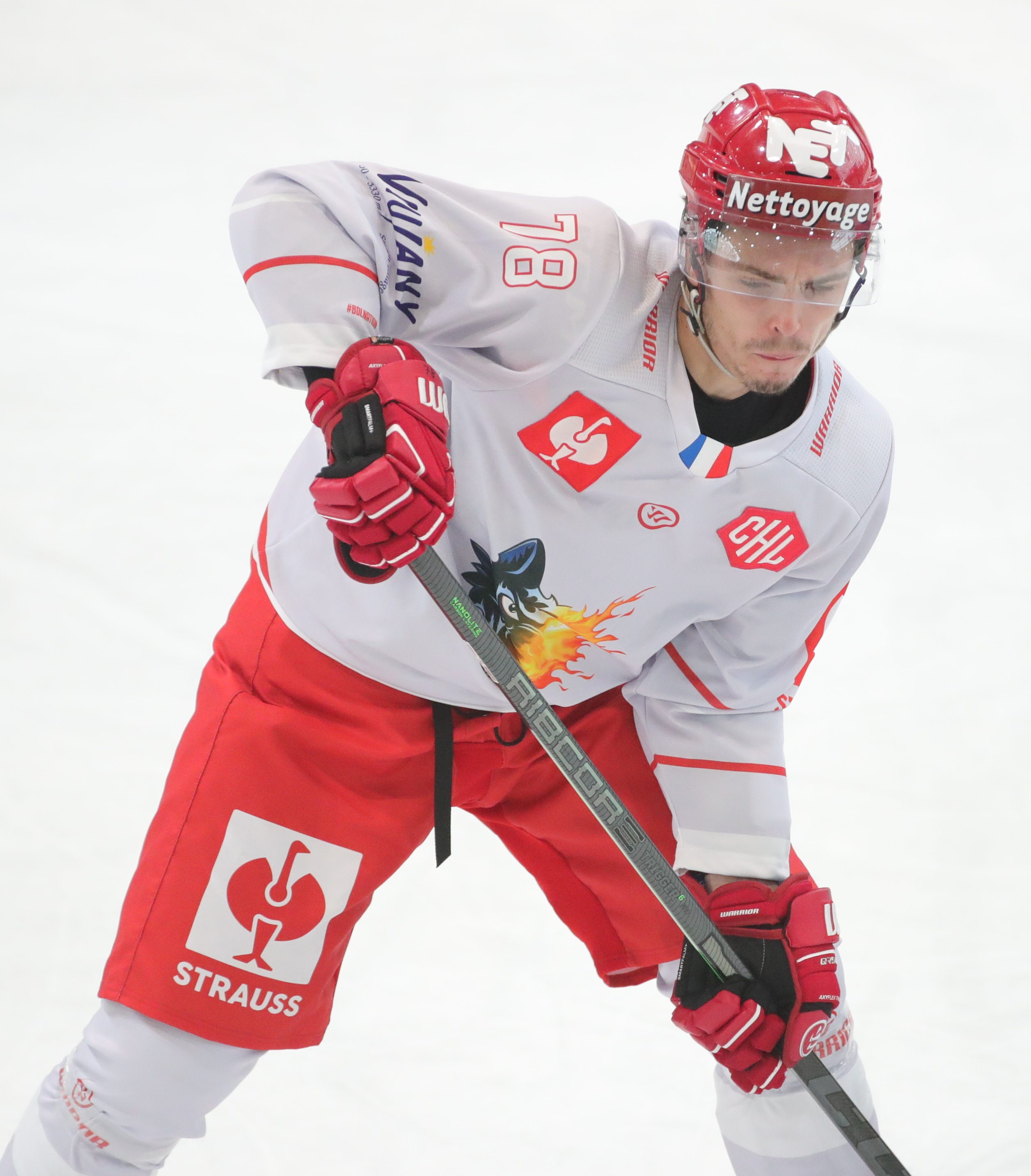
Dylan Fabre with the Brûleurs de Loups in 2022 in a Champions Hockey League game against Eisbären Berlin

In the 2017–18 season, Fabre played five games with Brûleurs de Loups of the French top division, Ligue Magnus. Fabre put up zero points and two penalty minutes. Brûleurs de Loups finished 2nd in the league. Fabre also played some U20 games and went on a 17-game loan with Les Grizzlys of the French 3rd division, where he put up 17 points.

The following season, 2018–19, Fabre played 25 games with the Brûleurs de Loups, only scoring three points. Fabre also played five games in the U20 league. He went on loan to two different teams, the Les Grizzlys (4 games, 5 points) and the Éléphants de Chambéry of the French 2nd division (5 games, 6 points). Brûleurs de Loups won the French Championship that season.

In the 2019–20 season, Fabre again represented the Brûleurs de Loups in 31 regular season games, with 18 points, and four playoff games, with one point. Fabre played six games for Brûleurs de Loups in the Champions Hockey League (CHL), the top level of European club competitions, but did not score a point.

The following 2020–21 season, Fabre played 22 regular season games for Brûleurs de Loups and put up nine points.

In the 2021–22 season, Fabre played again for Brûleurs de Loups. Fabre appeared in 31 regular season games where he put up 27 points. Fabre also played 10 playoff games with 11 points. Fabre got to hold the Magnus Cup with Brûleurs de Loups as they won the French Championship again.

The 2022–23 season saw Fabre break his career records in the Ligue Magnus and the Champions Hockey League, as he played 42 regular season games with 44 points and 15 playoff games with 14 points. Fabre also played six Champions Hockey League games where he put up four points. Fabre won the Coupe de France with Brûleurs de Loups, and placed 2nd in the French Championship. Fabre won the Jean Pierre-Graff Trophy, which is awarded for the most promising player of the Ligue Magnus each year.

==== HC Ässät Pori (2023–present) ====
On May 26, 2023, it was announced that Fabre signed a two-year contract to Finnish club HC Ässät Pori of the Liiga. Fabre made his debut in the Ässät jersey at the Pitsiturnaus preseason tournament where he scored 3 goals, all against Ässät's rival team Lukko. Fabre made his Liiga debut on the 13th of September in a game against Ilves Tampere. The Satakunnan Kansa newspaper described Fabre as potentially the best French player in the Liiga ever. Fabre finished his first Liiga season with 25 points in 60 games. In his second year at Ässät, Fabre scored 24 points in the regular season. In December 2024, Fabre's contract was extended to cover the 2025–26 Liiga season.

== International play ==
Fabre represented France in the U18 World Championships for six games with one point. Fabre got to represent the France men's national team in the 2022 IIHF World Championship where he played seven games without any points. He again represented France in the 2023 IIHF World Championship, playing in six games without any points. Fabre was cut from the 2024 World Championship team because of an injury.

== Playing style ==
Ässät general manager Janne Vuorinen described Dylan Fabre as a modern player with fast legs and a good scoring ability. Fabre has said that his greatest strength is his speed.

== Career statistics ==
=== Regular season and playoffs ===
			Regular season					Playoffs
Season	Team	League	GP	G	A	Pts	PIM	GP	G	A	Pts	PIM
2017–18	Brûleurs de Loups	FRA U20	17	12	12	24	2	6	8	5	13	2
2017–18	Brûleurs de Loups	Ligue Magnus	5	0	0	0	2	0	0	0	0	0
2018–19	Brûleurs de Loups	FRA U20	5	4	5	9	0	5	6	5	11	0
2018–19	Brûleurs de Loups	Ligue Magnus	25	1	2	3	2	—	—	—	—	—
2019–20	Brûleurs de Loups	Ligue Magnus	31	9	9	18	8	4	0	1	1	0
2020–21	Brûleurs de Loups	Ligue Magnus	22	5	4	9	5	6	1	1	2	25
2021–22	Brûleurs de Loups	Ligue Magnus	31	17	10	27	10	10	4	7	11	6
2022–23	Brûleurs de Loups	Ligue Magnus	42	22	22	44	6	15	11	3	14	2
2023–24	Porin Ässät	Liiga	60	12	13	25	6	–	–	–	–	–
2024–25	Porin Ässät	Liiga	60	13	11	24	16	10	2	4	6	0
Ligue Magnus totals			156	54	47	101	32	29	15	11	26	8
Liiga totals			120	25	24	49	22	10	2	4	6	0

=== International ===
Year	Team	Event	GP	G	A	Pts	PIM
2018	France	U18 WJC	6	0	1	1	4
2019	France	U20 WJC D1A	5	0	2	2	0
2020	France	U20 WJC D1B	5	3	5	8	0
2022	France	WC	7	0	0	0	2
2023	France	WC	6	0	0	0	6
2025	France	WC	1	1	0	1	0
2026	France	OG	4	0	0	0	0
Junior totals			16	3	8	11	4
Senior totals			18	1	0	1	8

== Awards and honours ==
Award	Year(s)
Ligue Magnus
Magnus Cup champion	2019, 2022
Jean-Pierre Graff Trophy	2023
Coupe de France	2023
