= Pousse =

Pousse is a surname. Notable people with the surname include:

- André Pousse (1919–2005), French actor
- Pierre Pousse (born 1966), French ice hockey player
