= Raymond Dewas Trophy =

The Raymond Dewas Trophy (French: Trophée Raymond Dewas) was awarded to the most sportsmanlike player in the Ligue Magnus from 1985 to 1998.

== Winners ==
Year	Player	Team
1997/98	Robert Ouellet	Brûleurs de Loups de Grenoble
1996/97	Ari Salo	Dragons de Rouen
1995/96	André Côté	Brest Albatros Hockey
1994/95	Robert Ouellet	Ducs d'Angers
1993/94	Franck Saunier	Dragons de Rouen
1992/93	Benoît Bachelet; Claude Verret	Gothiques d'Amiens; Dragons de Rouen
1991/92	Peter Almásy; Claude Verret	Diables Rouges de Briançon; Dragons de Rouen
1990/91	Patrick Foliot; Claude Verret	Gothiques d'Amiens; Dragons de Rouen
1989/90	Patrick Foliot; Claude Verret	Gothiques d'Amiens; Dragons de Rouen
1988/89	Wladimir Lubkin; Claude Verret	Gothiques d'Amiens; Dragons de Rouen
1987/88	Marc Gervais	Ours de Villard-de-Lans
1986/87	André Côté	Mont-Blanc HC
1985/86	Roland Cloutier	Rapaces de Gap
1984/85	Roland Cloutier	Rapaces de Gap
