= Jani Tuppurainen =

Finnish ice hockey player

- Born: March 30, 1980 (age 44); Oulu, Finland
- Height: 5 ft 11 in (180 cm)
- Weight: 176 lb (80 kg; 12 st 8 lb)
- Position: Forward
- Shot: Left
- Liiga team Former teams: Jukurit; Oulun Kärpät; KalPa; Färjestad BK; JYP Jyväskylä; HC Donbass
- National team: Finland
- NHL draft: Undrafted
- Playing career: 2000–2022

Jani Tuppurainen (born March 30, 1980) is a Finnish professional ice hockey forward who currently plays with Mikkelin Jukurit of the Liiga.

== Playing career ==
Undrafted, Tuppurainen won the Finnish Championships on two occasions with JYP Jyväskylä. He has also played for the Finnish National ice hockey team in Euro Hockey Tour.

On 14 April 2021, Tuppurainen extended his professional career, leaving JYP as a free agent and signing a one-year contract with fellow Liiga club, Mikkelin Jukurit.

== International play ==
In 2012 after winning Finnish Championships in Jyväskylä, Tuppurainen was chosen to represent the Finland men's national ice hockey team in 2012 IIHF World Championship.

== Career statistics ==
			Regular season					Playoffs
Season	Team	League	GP	G	A	Pts	PIM	GP	G	A	Pts	PIM
1995–96	Oulun Kärpät U16	U16 SM-sarja	23	4	6	10	6	—	—	—	—	—
1998–99	Laser HT U20	U20 2. Divisioona	—	—	—	—	—	—	—	—	—	—
1998–99	LiKi	2. Divisioona	—	—	—	—	—	—	—	—	—	—
1999–00	Chicago Freeze	NAHL	47	9	27	36	54	—	—	—	—	—
2000–01	Chicago Freeze	NAHL	17	3	8	11	44	—	—	—	—	—
2000–01	Kiekko-Oulu	Suomi-sarja	21	17	13	30	51	—	—	—	—	—
2001–02	Kiekko-Oulu	Suomi-sarja	26	17	20	37	65	4	2	2	4	4
2002–03	Hokki	Mestis	37	15	17	32	75	3	0	1	1	0
2002–03	Oulun Kärpät	SM-liiga	8	0	1	1	6	—	—	—	—	—
2003–04	Hokki	Mestis	39	13	22	35	32	4	2	0	2	12
2004–05	Hokki	Mestis	36	13	14	27	59	4	0	2	2	8
2005–06	KalPa	SM-liiga	48	7	12	19	55	—	—	—	—	—
2006–07	KalPa	SM-liiga	55	14	21	35	86	—	—	—	—	—
2007–08	KalPa	SM-liiga	43	13	20	33	30	—	—	—	—	—
2007–08	Färjestad BK	Elitserien	13	4	4	8	6	12	1	3	4	14
2008–09	JYP Jyväskylä	SM-liiga	24	4	8	12	10	15	1	2	3	4
2009–10	JYP Jyväskylä	SM-liiga	58	22	12	34	26	12	3	1	4	6
2010–11	JYP Jyväskylä	SM-liiga	43	10	19	29	47	10	0	7	7	4
2011–12	JYP Jyväskylä	SM-liiga	56	17	34	51	26	14	7	8	15	0
2012–13	Donbass Donetsk	KHL	39	7	8	15	42	—	—	—	—	—
2013–14	JYP Jyväskylä	Liiga	55	12	21	33	30	7	1	5	6	6
2014–15	JYP Jyväskylä	Liiga	57	17	34	51	28	11	4	6	10	33
2015–16	JYP Jyväskylä	Liiga	48	12	24	36	66	13	5	5	10	4
2016–17	JYP Jyväskylä	Liiga	60	12	27	39	26	15	1	5	6	8
2017–18	JYP Jyväskylä	Liiga	57	21	33	54	36	5	0	7	7	2
2018–19	JYP Jyväskylä	Liiga	54	10	27	37	26	3	1	1	2	0
2019–20	JYP Jyväskylä	Liiga	57	15	29	44	26	—	—	—	—	—
2020–21	JYP Jyväskylä	Liiga	59	11	23	34	44	—	—	—	—	—
2021–22	Mikkelin Jukurit	Liiga	20	1	3	4	18	—	—	—	—	—
2021–22	Brûleurs de Loups	Ligue Magnus	18	3	9	12	6	14	5	8	13	10
Liiga totals			802	198	348	546	586	105	23	47	70	67
