= Patrick Foliot =

French ice hockey player

Personal information
- Full name: Patrick Foliot
- Nationality: French and Saint-Pierrais
- Born: 1 March 1954 (age 72) St. Pierre, Saint Pierre and Miquelon

Sport
- Sport: Ice hockey

Patrick Foliot (born 1 March 1954) is a French and Saint-Pierrais former ice hockey goaltender. Born in St. Pierre, he started playing ice hockey at the age of six and later moved to France. There, he played as a back-up goaltender for Hockey Club de Caen before being selected to compete for the France men's national junior ice hockey team.

During the 1983–84 Nationale A season, he became the French champion with Club des Sports de Megève and was awarded the Jean Ferrand Trophy. After taking a break, he came back during the 1986–87 season with Yétis du Mont-Blanc and became French champion, again being awarded the Trophy. He also competed for the French national team with over a hundred appearances, competing in tournaments such as the 1988 Winter Olympics. With Gothiques d'Amiens he was awarded with two Raymond Dewas Trophies. After his retirement in 1993, he became a coach in Saint-Pierre and was appointed as the regional technical director for the French Ice Hockey Federation.

== Biography ==
Patrick Foliot was born on 1 March 1954 in Saint-Pierre of Saint Pierre and Miquelon, a self-governing territorial overseas collectivity of France. Similarly to his father and brother, Foliot started playing ice hockey at the age of six and played for the Saint-Pierre youth team. For his education, he earned vocational certificates in carpentry and industrial design and moved to Caen with other Saint-Pierrais students.

While he lived in Caen, he worked as a factory worker then quit after three weeks as he was not satisfied with his pay. He continued playing ice hockey at the Patinoire de Caen la mer as a back-up goaltender for Hockey Club de Caen and preferred peeling potatoes at the rink's bar in exchange of a meal rather than his job. As he played in the rink, the staff of the France men's national junior ice hockey team noticed him and selected him to compete in Pool B of the 1982 World Junior Ice Hockey Championships held in Heerenveen, Netherlands, though went back to France with a broken ankle after being hit by a car. He then played for Anglet Hormadi Élite in the FFHG Division 1 before switching to Club des Sports de Megève.

During the 1983–84 Nationale A season, he became the French champion and was awarded the Jean Ferrand Trophy as the best goaltender during the season. Around this time, he joined the France men's national ice hockey team but had struggled during the first games, leading him to avoid games during the 1984–85 season. He came back during the 1986–87 season with Yétis du Mont-Blanc and again became the French champion and was awarded the Jean Ferrand Trophy.

As part of the French national team, he made over 100 appearances with the team and competed for France at the 1988 Winter Olympics and Group B at the 1990 Men's Ice Hockey World Championships. For the 1989–90 Nationale 1A season and 1990–91 Ligue nationale season, he played for Gothiques d'Amiens and was awarded with two Raymond Dewas Trophies.

Foliot later retired in 1993 and became a coach in Saint-Pierre. He was appointed as the regional technical director for the French Ice Hockey Federation. His son, Andy Foliot, also became an ice hockey player and coach. In 2026, he retired from coaching after 33 years.
