= 1970–71 1re série season =

French professional ice hockey season

The 1970–71 1re série season was the 50th season of the 1re série, the top level of ice hockey in France. 10 teams participated in the league, and Chamonix Hockey Club won their 26th league title.

== First round ==
=== Paris-Nord Group ===
	Club	GP	W	T	L	GF	GA	Pts
1.	Athletic Club de Boulogne-Billancourt	12	10	0	2	77	28	32
2.	US Métro	12	10	0	2	78	36	32
3.	Français Volants	12	3	0	9	33	68	18
4.	CPM Croix	12	1	0	11	24	80	14

=== Alpes-Provence Group ===
	Club	GP	W	T	L	GF	GA	Pts
1.	Chamonix Hockey Club	10	10	0	0	54	15	30
2.	Sporting Hockey Club Saint Gervais	10	7	0	3	65	24	24
3.	Ours de Villard-de-Lans	10	6	0	4	63	39	22
4.	Gap Hockey Club	10	4	0	6	34	37	18
5.	Club des Sports de Megève	10	3	0	7	26	41	16
6.	Diables Rouges de Briançon	10	0	0	10	8	94	10

=== Qualification game for final round ===
- Ours de Villard-de-Lans - US Métro 9:4

== Final round ==
	Club	GP	W	T	L	GF	GA	Pts
1.	Chamonix Hockey Club	6	6	0	0	38	15	12
2.	Sporting Hockey Club Saint Gervais	5	2	0	3	30	25	4
3.	Ours de Villard-de-Lans	6	2	0	4	31	43	4
4.	Athletic Club de Boulogne-Billancourt	5	1	0	4	21	37	2
