= Peter Valier =

French ice hockey player

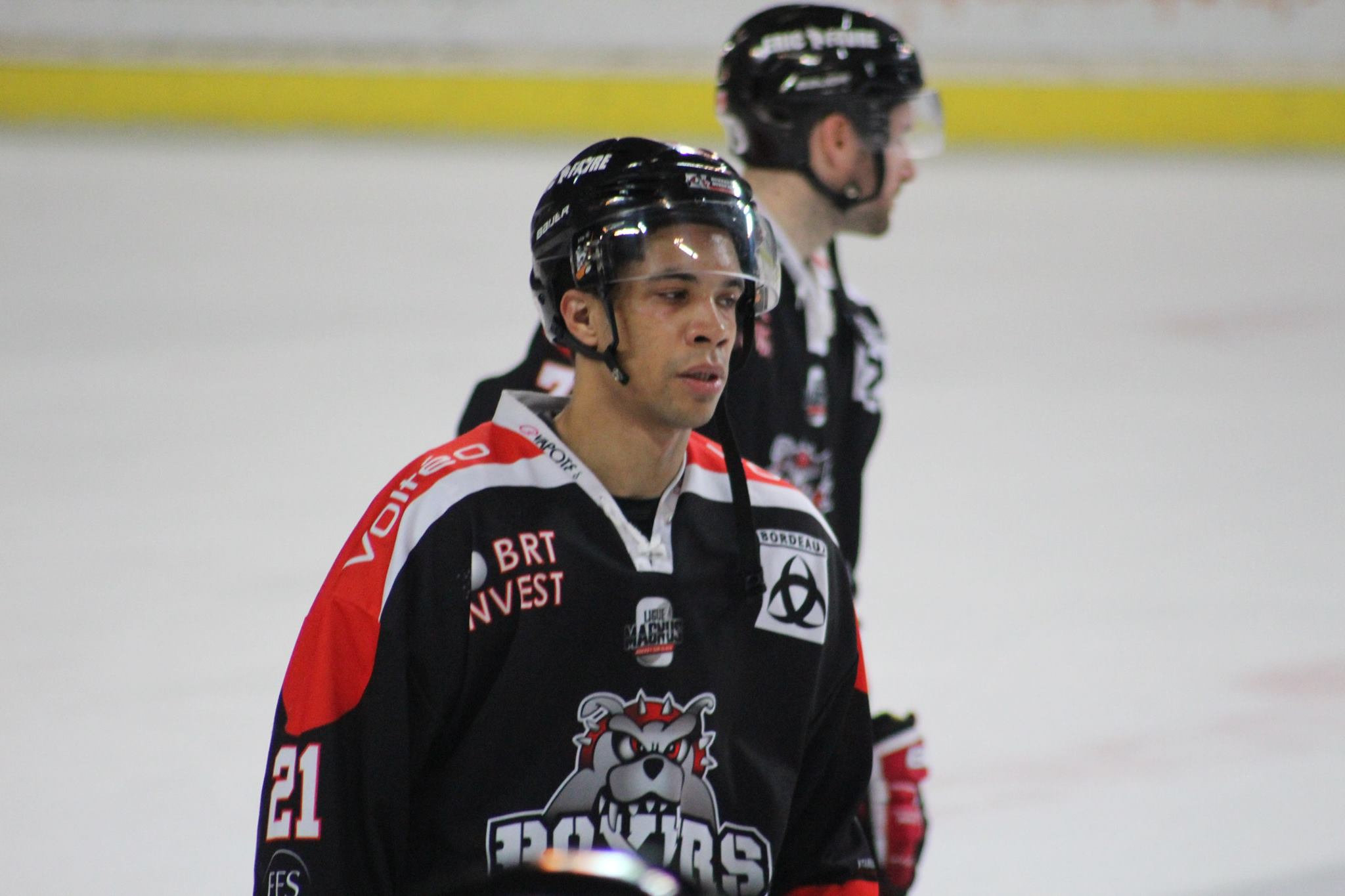
- Born: 27 July 1992 (age 33) Pontoise, France
- Height: 1.80 m (5 ft 11 in)
- Weight: 82 kg (181 lb; 12 st 13 lb)
- Position: Forward
- Shoots: Right
- LM team Former teams: Brûleurs de Loups; Phenix de Reims; Dragons de Rouen; Ducs de Dijon; Gamyo d'Épinal; Boxers de Bordeaux
- National team: France
- NHL draft: Undrafted
- Playing career: 2009–present

Peter Valier (born 27 July 1992) is a French ice hockey player for Brûleurs de Loups and the French national team.

He represented France at the 2019 IIHF World Championship.
