= Albert Hassler =

French sportsman (1903–1994)

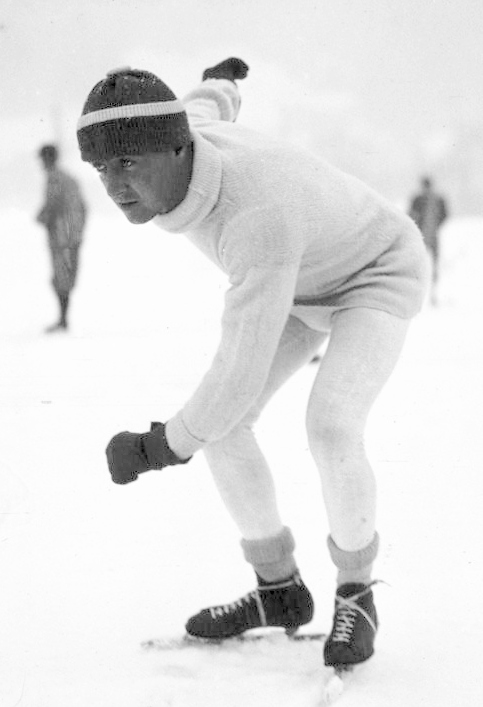
- Hassler in 1926

Personal information
- Born: 2 November 1903 Chamonix, France
- Died: 22 September 1994 (aged 90) Chamonix, France

Sport
- Sport: Ice hockey, speed skating
- Club: Chamonix HC

Achievements and titles
- Personal best(s): 500 m – 48.6 (1926); 1500 m – 2:37.4 (1927); 5000 m – 9:28.6 (1927); 10000 m – 19:10.8 (1927)
Medal record
Representing France
Ice hockey
European Championships
Silver medal – second place	1923 Antwerp	Team
Gold medal – first place	1924 Milan	Team

Albert Hassler (2 November 1903 – 22 September 1994) was a French ice hockey player and speed skater.

== Career ==
Hassler played for the France men's national ice hockey team at the 1924 Winter Olympics in Chamonix, the 1928 Winter Olympics in St. Moritz, and at the 1936 Winter Olympics in Garmisch-Partenkirchen. He also finished 18th in the 500 meters speed skating event at the 1924 Games.

He also played for the French national team at the Ice Hockey European Championships in 1923 and 1924, winning a silver medal at the 1923 event and a gold medal in 1924.

The award for the most valuable French player in the Ligue Magnus, the Albert Hassler Trophy is named after him. In 2009, he was inducted into the French Ice Hockey Hall of Fame. His daughter Nicole Hassler became an Olympic figure skater.
