= Jean Vassieux =

French ice hockey player (1949–2021)

- Born: 31 October 1949 France
- Died: 30 December 2021 (aged 72)
- Height: 5 ft 9 in (175 cm)
- Weight: 148 lb (67 kg; 10 st 8 lb)
- Position: Forward
- Nationale A team: Ours de Villard-de-Lans
- National team: France

Jean Vassieux (31 October 1949 – 29 December 2021) was a French ice hockey player.

== Life and career ==
Vassieux played as a forward. He was a member of the French national team and participated in the Ice Hockey World Championships in 1978 and 1979. He was a team captain from 1976 to 1979. He played professionally for Ours de Villard-de-Lans and was awarded the Albert Hassler Trophy in 1978. In 2013, he was inducted into the French Ice Hockey Hall of Fame. He died on 29 December 2021, at the age of 72.
