= 1984–85 Nationale A season =

French professional ice hockey season

The 1984–85 Nationale A season was the 64th season of the Nationale A, the top level of ice hockey in France. 12 teams participated in the league, and Sporting Hockey Club Saint Gervais won their fifth league title. Hockey Club de Caen was relegated to the Nationale B.

== First round ==
	Club	GP	W	T	L	GF	GA	Pts
1.	Sporting Hockey Club Saint Gervais	22	19	0	3	148	95	38
2.	Gap Hockey Club	22	16	1	5	160	108	33
3.	Club des Sports de Megève	22	14	4	4	143	95	32
4.	Français Volants	22	14	1	7	138	113	29
5.	CSG Grenoble	22	12	4	6	132	96	28
6.	Chamonix Hockey Club	22	12	2	8	140	115	26
7.	Diables Rouges de Briançon	22	7	1	14	108	160	15
8.	Ours de Villard-de-Lans	22	6	3	13	102	123	15
9.	HC Amiens Somme	22	6	2	14	87	119	14
10.	Viry-Châtillon Essonne Hockey	22	4	4	14	92	109	12
11.	Hockey Club de Caen	22	3	3	16	112	192	9
12.	ASG Tours	22	6	1	15	103	140	8*

- (* ASG Tours had five points deducted.)

== Final round ==
	Club	GP	W	T	L	GF	GA	Pts
1.	Sporting Hockey Club Saint Gervais	32	25	2	5	208	136	52
2.	Club des Sports de Megève	32	20	5	7	196	133	45
3.	Gap Hockey Club	32	20	4	8	211	154	44
4.	Français Volants	32	20	2	10	196	149	42
5.	Chamonix Hockey Club	32	15	2	15	174	187	32
6.	CSG Grenoble	32	13	5	14	161	148	31

== Relegation round ==
	Club	GP	W	T	L	GF	GA	Pts
7.	Ours de Villard-de-Lans	32	10	5	17	158	179	25
8.	Viry-Châtillon Essonne Hockey	32	10	5	17	152	162	25
9.	HC Amiens Somme	32	11	2	19	137	169	24
10.	Diables Rouges de Briançon	32	11	2	19	186	226	24
11.	ASG Tours	32	10	4	18	176	208	19
12.	Hockey Club de Caen	32	6	4	22	166	270	16
