= 1985–86 Nationale 1A season =

French professional ice hockey season

The 1985–86 Nationale 1A season was the 65th season of the Nationale 1A, the top level of ice hockey in France. 12 teams participated in the league, and Sporting Hockey Club Saint Gervais won their sixth league title. Chamonix Hockey Club and ASG Tours were relegated to the Nationale 2.

== First round ==
	Club	GP	W	T	L	GF	GA	Pts
1.	Sporting Hockey Club Saint Gervais	22	21	0	1	204	68	42
2.	Français Volants	22	19	0	3	216	92	38
3.	Club des Sports de Megève	22	14	1	7	139	102	29
4.	Diables Rouges de Briançon	22	13	1	8	133	127	27
5.	Gap Hockey Club	22	10	4	8	128	144	24
6.	HC Amiens Somme	22	10	2	10	118	117	22
7.	Dragons de Rouen	22	10	0	12	127	179	20
8.	CSG Grenoble	22	9	1	12	117	117	19
9.	Viry-Châtillon Essonne Hockey	22	8	2	12	142	176	18
10.	Chamonix Hockey Club	22	4	1	17	108	179	9
11.	Ours de Villard-de-Lans	22	3	3	16	78	160	9
12.	ASG Tours	22	3	1	18	97	146	7

== Final round ==
	Club	GP	W	T	L	GF	GA	Pts
1.	Sporting Hockey Club Saint Gervais	32	29	0	3	71	37	58
2.	Français Volants	32	26	1	5	85	52	53
3.	HC Amiens Somme	32	16	3	13	52	47	35
4.	Club des Sports de Megève	32	17	1	14	45	47	35
5.	Diables Rouges de Briançon	32	15	2	15	53	93	32
6.	Gap Hockey Club	32	12	5	15	43	73	29

== Qualification round ==
	Club	GP	W	T	L	GF	GA	Pts
7.	Dragons de Rouen	32	17	1	14	97	66	35
8.	CSG Grenoble	32	16	1	15	70	63	33
9.	Viry-Châtillon Essonne Hockey	32	10	3	19	66	85	23
10.	Ours de Villard-de-Lans	32	8	4	20	53	67	20
11.	Chamonix Hockey Club	32	9	1	22	74	65	19
12.	ASG Tours	32	5	2	25	60	74	12

== Relegation ==
- Bordeaux Gironde Hockey 2000 - Ours de Villard-de-Lans 5:4/3:7
