= Jean Ferrand =

French ice hockey player

President of the French Ice Sports Federation
- In office 1984–1990
- Succeeded by: Pierre-curve Michollet

Chairman of the National Committee of French Ice Hockey
- In office 1970–1983

President of HC Gap
- In office 1954–1971

Personal details
- Died: 11 November 1990
Ice hockey career
- Position: Goaltender
- Played for: HC Gap (1945-1956)

Jean Ferrand (died 11 November 1990) was a French ice hockey goaltender and the long-time president of the French Ice Sports Federation.

== Playing career ==
Ferrand was the goaltender for HC Gap from 1945 to 1956.

== Executive career ==
Ferrand was the president of the HC Gap from 1954 to 1971. From 1970 to 1983, he acted as the Chairman of the National Committee of French ice hockey. In this capacity, he represented France at the Council of the International Ice Hockey Federation (IIHF). In 1984 Ferrand succeeded Pierre-curve Michollet as president of the French Ice Sports Federation, a position he held until his death in 1990.

== Honours ==
- Since the 1977–78 season, the Jean Ferrand Trophy has been awarded to the best goaltender in the Ligue Magnus.
- In 2008, Ferrand was a charter inductee into the French Ice Hockey Hall of Fame.
