= Petri Ylönen =

Finnish-born French ice hockey player

- Born: October 2, 1962 (age 63) Helsinki, Finland
- Height: 6 ft 2 in (188 cm)
- Weight: 200 lb (91 kg; 14 st 4 lb)
- Position: Goaltender
- Caught: Left
- Played for: Ligue Magnus; HC Briançon; Rouen HE; Division 2 Toulouse BHC; 1. Divisioona; TuTo
- National team: France
- Playing career: 1986–2002

Petri Ylönen (born October 2, 1962) is a Finnish born French former professional ice hockey goaltender who played in the French national ice hockey team.

== Playing career ==
=== Early career ===
Petri Ylönen started his career in Finnish First Division team TuTo, which is based in Turku. Ylönen was raised by Karhu-Kissat.

=== Career in France ===
Ylönen moved to HC Briançon in 1987 and spent two seasons, playing for the team. After Briançon, Ylönen moved to Rouen HE, where he won five Ligue Magnus-championships. He received 5 times the Jean Ferrand Trophy as best goaltender in the league.

=== Move to Germany and retirement ===
Ylönen played his last two seasons in Germany, where he played for Augsburger Panther.

Ylönen retired in 1998.

=== Return ===
After retiring, Ylönen moved to live near Toulouse.

Ylönen made a two-season return to ice hockey as he played for Division 2 team Toulouse BHC from 2000 to 2002.

=== Family ===
Petri Ylönen has two sons who also play ice hockey in France - Sebastian Ylönen (goalkeeper) and Baptiste Ylönen (forward).

== International career ==
Petri Ylönen is a French National and played 150 games for the French national ice hockey team.

Ylönen played six times in the Ice Hockey World Championships: 1991 Pool B Yugoslavia, 1992 Czechoslovakia, 1993 Germany, 1994 Italy, 1995 Sweden, 1996 Austria, and twice in the Winter Olympics, Albertville 1992 and Lillehammer 1994.
