= Janne Jalasvaara =

Finnish ice hockey player

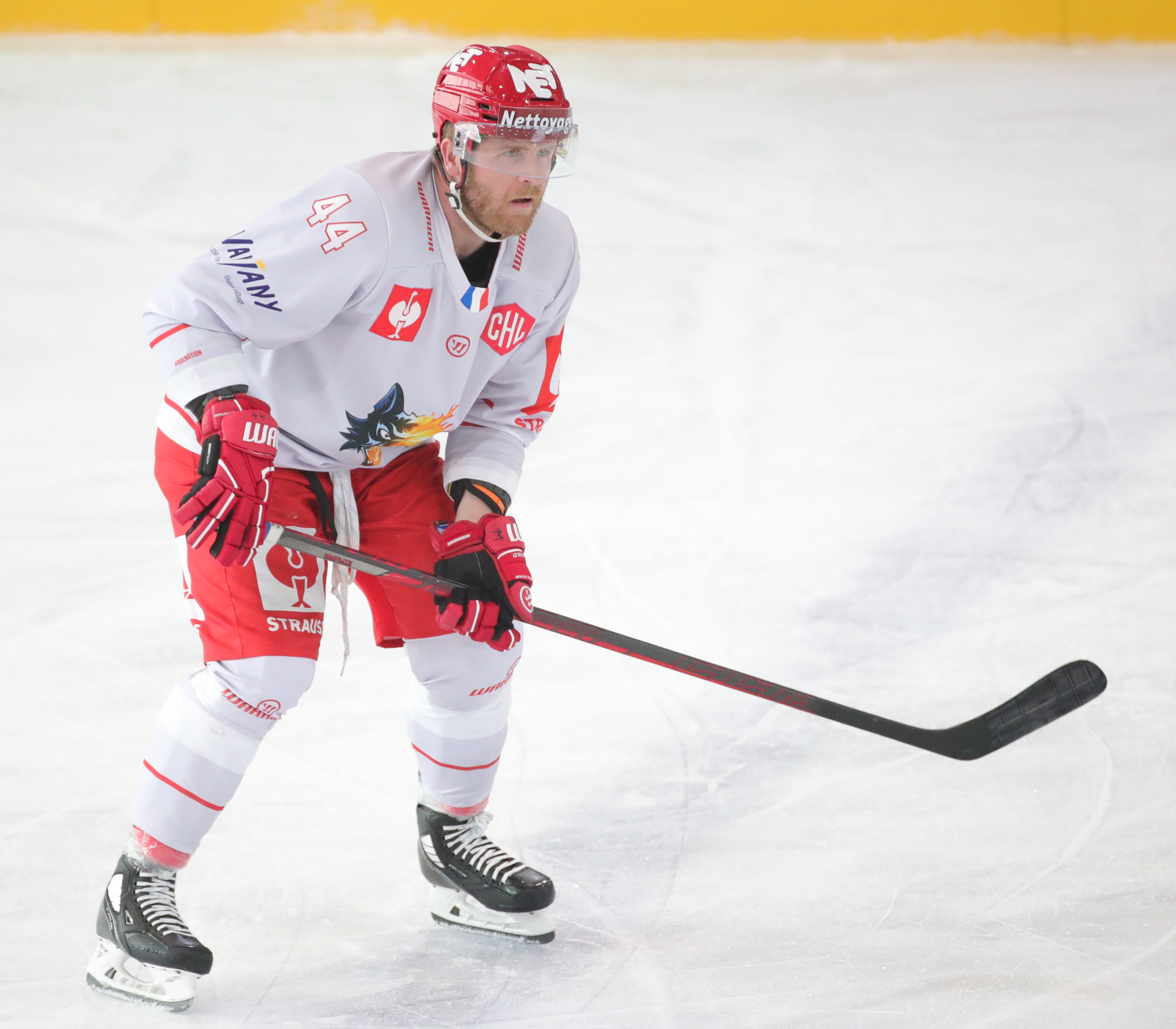
- Born: 15 April 1984 (age 41); Oulu, Finland
- Height: 5 ft 11 in (180 cm)
- Weight: 198 lb (90 kg; 14 st 2 lb)
- Position: Defence
- Shoots: Left
- Ligue Magnus team Former teams: Brûleurs de Loups; Espoo Blues; Haukat; HC Salamat; Kiekko-Vantaa; KalPa; HC Dynamo Moscow; Dynamo Balashikha; HC Sochi; HC Kunlun Red Star; Rögle BK; Timrå IK; Lahti Pelicans; HK Dukla Trenčín
- National team: Finland
- NHL draft: Undrafted
- Playing career: 2002–present

Janne Jalasvaara (born 15 April 1984) is a Finnish professional ice hockey defenceman. He is currently playing for Brûleurs de Loups of the French Synerglace Ligue Magnus.

== Career ==
Jalasvaara has played in Liiga for Espoo Blues and KalPa, the Kontinental Hockey League for Dynamo Moscow, HC Sochi and Kunlun Red Star and in the Swedish Hockey League for Rögle BK and Timrå IK. He has won the Gagarin Cup twice with HC Dynamo Moscow and was chosen to the 2013 Finland men's national ice hockey team for the 2013 IIHF World Championship.

== Career statistics ==
=== Regular season and playoffs ===
			Regular season					Playoffs
Season	Team	League	GP	G	A	Pts	PIM	GP	G	A	Pts	PIM
2002–03	Espoo Blues	SM-l	14	0	0	4	3	0	0	0	0	0
2003–04	Espoo Blues	SM-l	39	0	1	1	16	9	0	0	0	0
2004–05	Espoo Blues	SM-l	49	1	5	6	45	—	—	—	—	—
2005–06	Espoo Blues	SM-l	17	0	0	0	10	1	0	0	0	0
2006–07	KalPa	SM-l	44	2	6	8	50	—	—	—	—	—
2007–08	KalPa	SM-l	55	9	13	22	75	—	—	—	—	—
2008–09	KalPa	SM-l	51	5	14	19	53	—	—	—	—	—
2009–10	KalPa	SM-l	55	9	16	25	88	13	2	4	6	2
2010–11	KalPa	SM-l	40	9	8	17	51	—	—	—	—	—
2010–11	Dynamo Moscow	KHL	10	1	4	5	10	6	1	1	2	6
2011–12	Dynamo Moscow	KHL	38	5	8	13	32	21	0	5	5	10
2012–13	Dynamo Moscow	KHL	36	6	9	15	30	19	4	3	7	10
2012–13	Dynamo Balashikha	VHL	1	0	0	0	2	—	—	—	—	—
2013–14	Dynamo Moscow	KHL	41	2	7	9	19	7	0	2	2	10
2014–15	Dynamo Moscow	KHL	58	5	7	12	22	11	1	3	4	13
2015–16	HC Sochi	KHL	57	0	6	6	57	4	0	1	1	2
2016–17	HC Kunlun Red Star	KHL	49	5	11	16	26	5	0	0	0	0
Liiga totals			364	35	63	98	392	26	2	4	6	2
KHL totals			289	24	52	76	196	73	6	14	20	51
