= 1979–80 Nationale A season =

French professional ice hockey season

The 1979–80 Nationale A season was the 59th season of the Nationale A, the top level of ice hockey in France. 10 teams participated in the league, and ASG Tours won their first league title. Français Volants was relegated to the Nationale B.

== First round ==
	Club	GP	W	T	L	GF	GA	Pts
1.	ASG Tours	18	14	2	2	139	88	30
2.	Chamonix Hockey Club	18	13	0	5	112	86	26
3.	Gap Hockey Club	18	8	3	7	89	80	19
4.	CSG Grenoble	18	9	1	8	92	94	19
5.	Sporting Hockey Club Saint Gervais	18	8	2	8	102	93	18
6.	Hockey Club de Caen	18	7	3	8	113	110	17
7.	Club des Sports de Megève	18	6	3	9	91	111	15
8.	Viry-Châtillon Essonne Hockey	18	6	1	11	87	113	13
9.	Ours de Villard-de-Lans	18	5	2	11	82	102	12
10.	Français Volants	18	5	1	12	94	124	11

== Final round ==
	Club	GP	W	T	L	GF	GA	Pts
1.	ASG Tours	10	9	1	0	103	49	68
2.	Chamonix Hockey Club	10	6	1	3	62	57	52
3.	Sporting Hockey Club Saint Gervais	10	6	0	4	68	70	42
4.	Gap Hockey Club	10	4	0	6	36	48	35
5.	CSG Grenoble	10	2	1	7	57	80	29
6.	Hockey Club de Caen	10	1	1	8	54	76	23

== Relegation ==
	Club	GP	W	T	L	GF	GA	Pts (Bonus)
1.	Club des Sports de Megève	10	6	0	4	50	42	16(4)
2.	Viry-Châtillon Essonne Hockey	10	5	2	3	51	51	14(2)
3.	Club des patineurs lyonnais	10	6	1	3	49	37	13(0)
4.	Ours de Villard-de-Lans	10	6	1	3	59	35	13(0)
5.	Français Volants	10	5	0	5	53	54	10(0)
6.	Diables Rouges de Briançon	10	0	0	10	35	78	0(0)
