= Matija Pintarič =

Slovenian ice hockey player (born 1989)

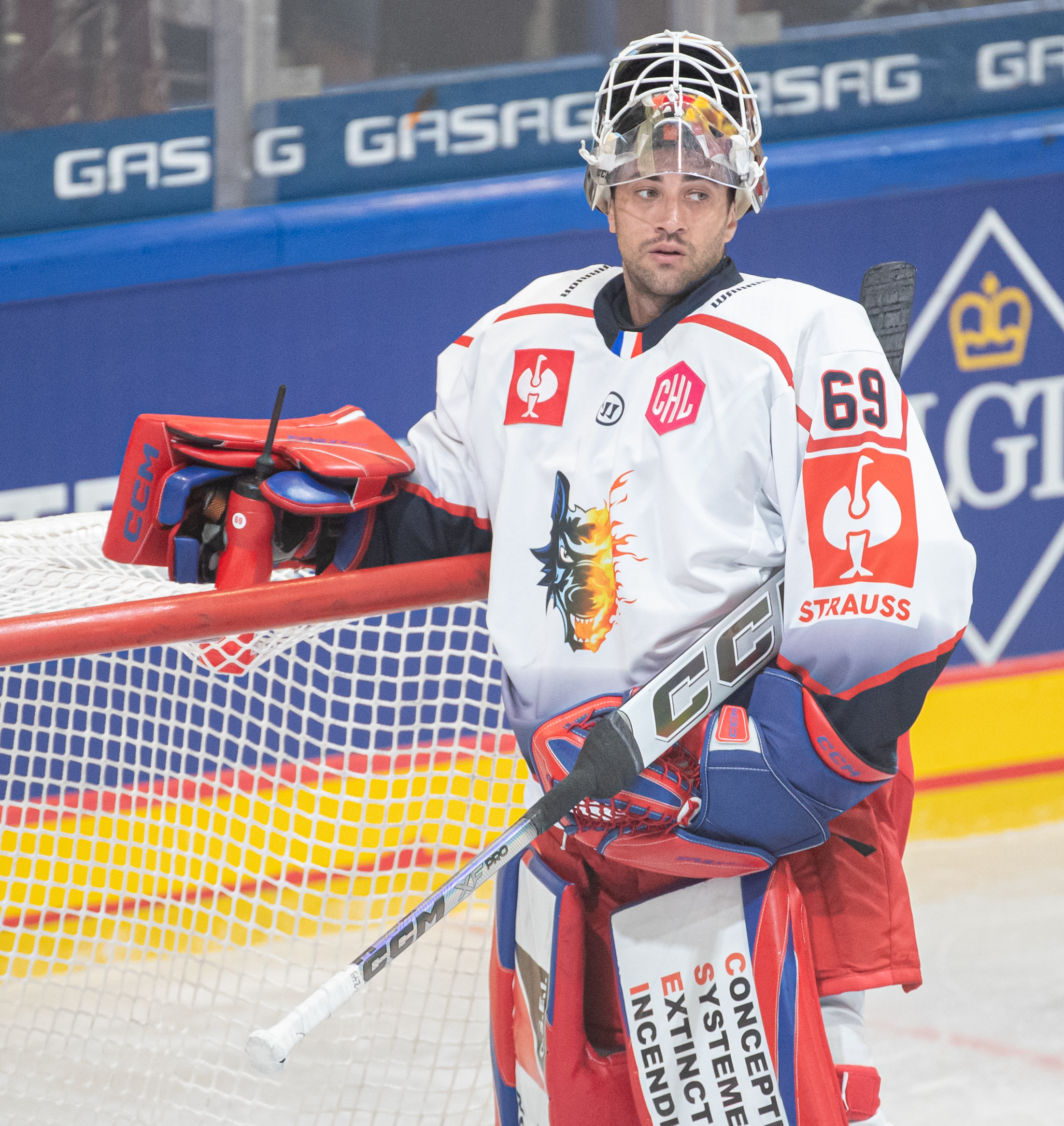
- Pintarič in 2025
- Born: 11 August 1989 (age 36) Maribor, SFR Yugoslavia
- Height: 5 ft 11 in (180 cm)
- Weight: 168 lb (76 kg; 12 st 0 lb)
- Position: Goaltender
- Catches: Left
- Ligue Magnus team Former teams: Brûleurs de Loups; HK Maribor; HDD Olimpija Ljubljana; Beibarys Atyrau; Ducs de Dijon; LHC Les Lions; Dragons de Rouen
- National team: Slovenia
- NHL draft: Undrafted
- Playing career: 2003–present

Matija Pintarič (born 11 August 1989) is a Slovenian ice hockey goaltender playing for Brûleurs de Loups of the Ligue Magnus. He participated at the 2011 IIHF World Championship as a member of the Slovenia men's national ice hockey team.

Pintaric is a three-time winner (2017, 2019, 2020) of the Jean Ferrand Trophy awarded to the best goaltender in the French Ligue Magnus. He was also voted best goaltender of the Champions Hockey League group stage in 2018 and 2021.
