= Christian Pouget =

French ice hockey player (born 1966)

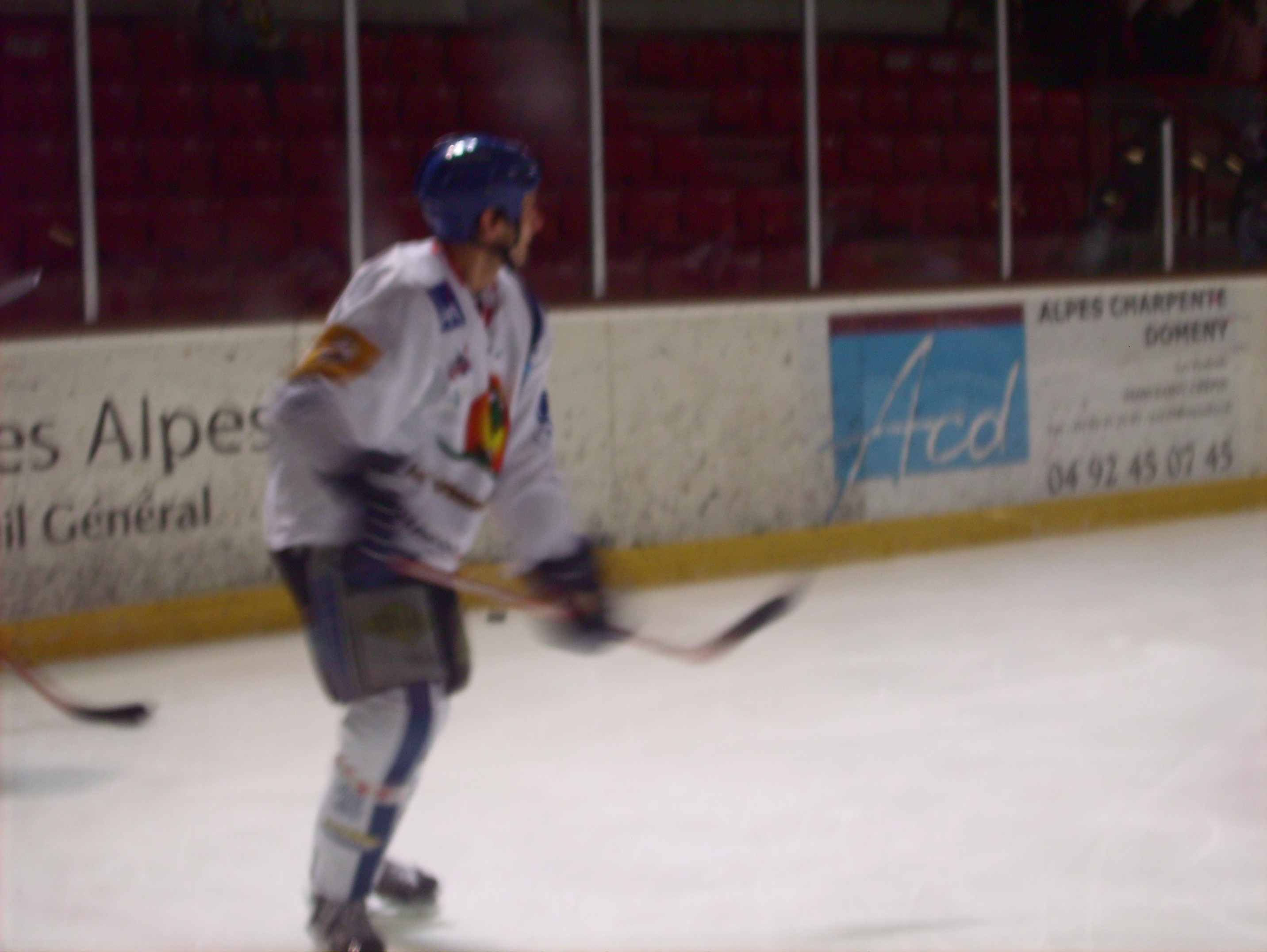
- Born: January 11, 1966 (age 59); Gap, France
- Height: 5 ft 11 in (180 cm)
- Weight: 181 lb (82 kg; 12 st 13 lb)
- Position: Left wing
- Shot: Left
- Played for: Trois-Rivières Draveurs; Gap Hockey Club; Grenoble Métropole Hockey 38; Chamonix Hockey Club; HC Devils Milano; Rouen Hockey Élite 76; Adler Mannheim; HC La Chaux-de-Fonds; Mont-Blanc HC; HC Valpellice
- National team: France
- Playing career: 1986–2009

Christian Pouget (born January 11, 1966) is a retired French professional ice hockey player.

== Achievements ==
- 1987 Albert Hassler Trophy
- 1991 French champion with Grenoble Métropole Hockey 38
- 1995 Albert Hassler Trophy
- 1997 German champion with Adler Mannheim
- 1998 German champion with Adler Mannheim
- 1999 German champion with Adler Mannheim
- 2002 Albert Hassler Trophy
- 2006 Ligue Magnus All-Star Team
- 2007 Ligue Magnus All-Star Team
- 2008 Ligue Magnus All-Star Team
- 2009 Ligue Magnus All-Star Team

== Olympic career ==
Pouget competed in three Olympics representing France - 1988, 1992, and 1998. At the 1998 games he scored the game winning goal against Japan.

== Career statistics ==
=== Deutsche Eishockey Liga ===
	Seasons	GP	Goals	Assists	Pts	PIM
Regular season	3	128	36	68	104	144
Playoffs	2	19	7	17	24	16
