= Tommi Satosaari =

Finnish ice hockey player

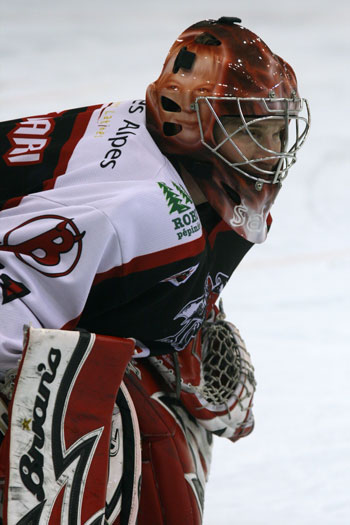
- Satosaari in 2008
- Born: February 17, 1975 (age 51) Jyväskylä, Finland
- Height: 6 ft 1 in (185 cm)
- Weight: 187 lb (85 kg; 13 st 5 lb)
- Position: Goaltender
- Caught: Left
- Played for: JYP; Newcastle Jesters; Ässät; Ilves; HK Olimpija Ljubljana; Pelicans; Diables Rouges de Briançon; Alba Volán Székesfehérvár
- Playing career: 1996–2011; 2016–2017

Tommi Satosaari (born February 17, 1975, in Jyväskylä, Finland) is a Finnish professional ice hockey goaltender.

Satosaari played his first five years as a pro with his hometown team JYP in the SM-liiga. When the team unloaded several players after a disappointing 1999–2000 season, Satosaari made his way abroad, spending the next season with the Newcastle Jesters in the British Ice Hockey Superleague (BISL). Satosaari then returned to Finland for a season with Ässät, and in 2002-2003 he represented REV Bremerhaven in the German second league in the fall, and finished the year with Ilves. In 2003-2004 Satosaari returned to Newcastle to play for the Newcastle Vipers in the British National League before and moving to HK Olimpija Ljubljana in Slovenia for the 2004–2005 season.

Returning to JYP, Satosaari was made Sinuhe Wallinheimo's backup, but when Wallinheimo performed exceptionally well Satosaari transferred to Pelicans for the rest of the season.
