= Philippe Lacarrière =

French ice hockey player (born 1938)

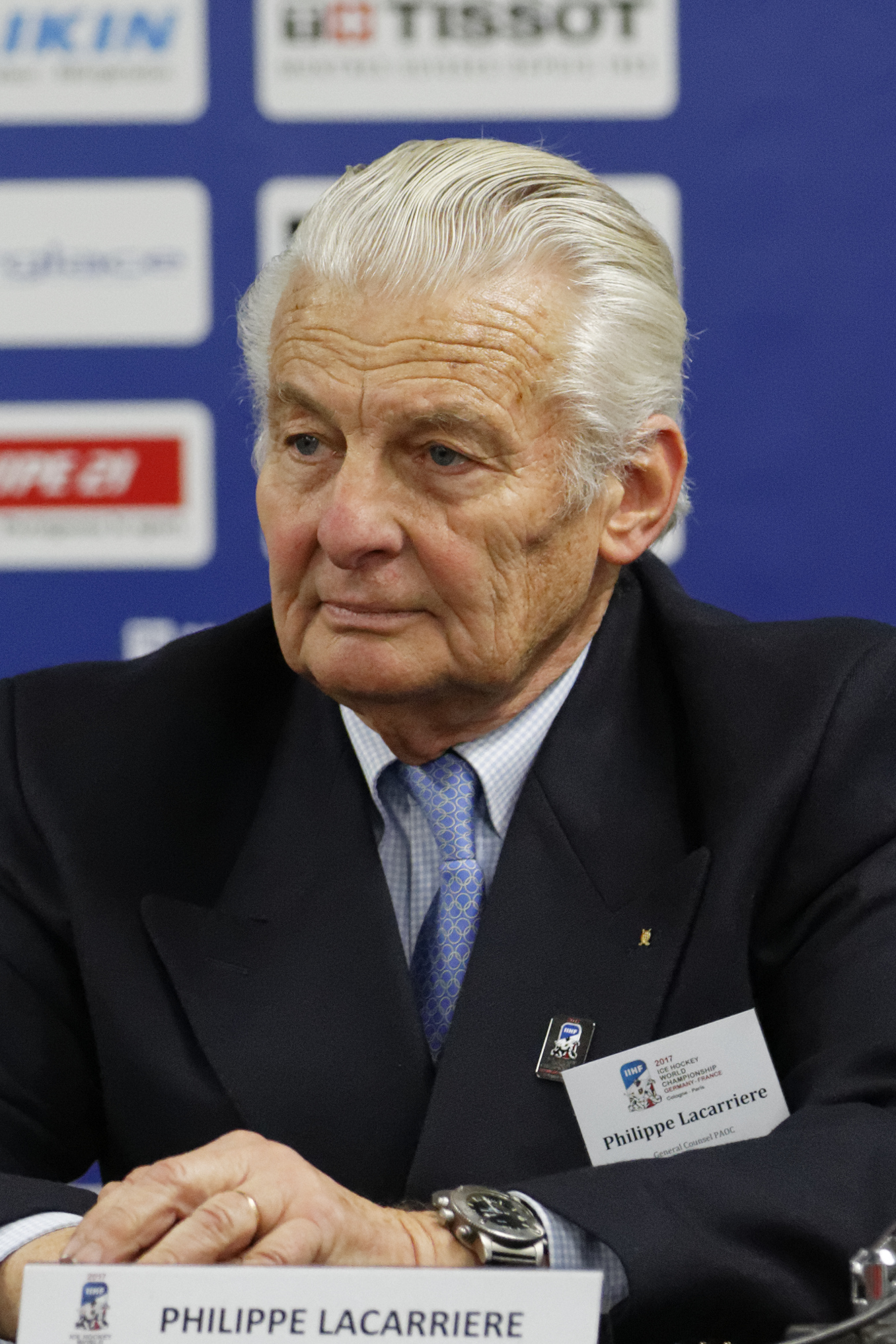
- Born: 20 April 1938 (age 86); Paris, France
- Known for: French Federation of Ice Sports; French Ice Hockey Federation
- Father: Jacques Lacarrière
- Awards: IIHF Hall of Fame; French Ice Hockey Hall of Fame
Ice hockey career
- National team: France
- Playing career: 1959–1972

Philippe Lacarrière (born 20 April 1938) is a French former ice hockey player and current ice hockey executive.

After representing France at the Ice Hockey World Championships and Winter Olympics, Lacarrière joined the French Federation of Ice Sports and became an executive member of the International Ice Hockey Federation (IIHF).

In 2011, he was inducted into the French Ice Hockey Hall of Fame and in 2018, he was inducted into the IIHF Hall of Fame for his work with the French International Ice Hockey committee. Lacarrière and his father, Jacques, became the second father-son pair to be inducted into the IIHF Hall of Fame.

== Playing career ==
Lacarrière began playing in France’s domestic leagues with the Paris Université Club and Français Volants before joining the national ranks. Lacarrière then captained Athletic Club de Boulogne-Billancourt during their 1959 and 1960 Spengler Cup run.

Lacarrière later represented France on the national stage during Ice Hockey World Championships and Winter Olympics. While playing in Pool B during the 1961 Ice Hockey World Championships and 1962 Ice Hockey World Championships, Lacarrière was the team's top scorer. He also played for Team France in Pool C during the 1963 World Ice Hockey Championships and captained France during the 1967 World Ice Hockey Championships. During the 1967 tournament, Lacarrière won the IIHF Directorate Award as Best Defenceman. He later represented France at the 1968 Winter Olympics.

== Executive career ==
Lacarrière founded the Olympic Club Courbevoie, a hockey club, in 1972 before retiring at 44. After retiring from hockey, Lacarrière became the vice-president of the hockey committee of the French Federation of Ice Sports, before the establishment of the French Ice Hockey Federation, from 1972 to 1998. During his time as vice-president, he became a member of the IIHF’s Disciplinary Committee, which he served from 1990 to 1994, and was named to the IIHF Council. Before the 1992 Winter Olympics, which were held in France, Lacarrière was named the head of the organizing committee for the hockey tournament. While serving as chairman for the IIHF’s Rules Committee, Lacarrière introduced a new rule against checking to the head, which was then made mandatory worldwide in 2002. Lacarrière left the IIHF Council in 2003 after serving for nine years. He then served as the president of Français Volants, a club his father had formed, from 2004 to 2006, taking over from his brother Thierry. The club experienced financial strain during his presidency because of a lack of funding for Division 2 teams. In 2007, Lacarrière left Français Volants and managed France's U20 team.

Lacarrière also sat on the French Ice Hockey Federation executive board, and in 2014 was named Secretary of the French Organizing Committee for the 2017 IIHF World Championship.

== Honors and awards ==
In 2011, Lacarrière was inducted into the French Ice Hockey Hall of Fame. He was inducted into the IIHF Hall of Fame in 2018. This made him and his father, Jacques Lacarrière, the second father-son pair to be inducted into the IIHF Hall of Fame.
