= Philippe Bozon =

French ice hockey player

- Born: November 30, 1966 (age 59) Chamonix, France
- Height: 5 ft 10 in (178 cm)
- Weight: 191 lb (87 kg; 13 st 9 lb)
- Position: Left wing
- Shot: Left
- Played for: St. Louis Blues; HC Mont-Blanc; Chamonix HC; Brûleurs de Loups de Grenoble; Adler Mannheim; HC Lugano; Genève-Servette HC; HC Lausanne; HC La Chaux-de-Fonds
- National team: France
- NHL draft: Undrafted
- Playing career: 1986–2006

Philippe Bozon (born November 30, 1966) is a French former professional ice hockey player who played for the St. Louis Blues in the National Hockey League (NHL) between the 1991–92 and 1994-95 seasons. He is the first of only seven French-born and trained players to appear in the NHL, the other six being Cristobal Huet, Stéphane Da Costa, Antoine Roussel, Pierre-Édouard Bellemare, Yohann Auvitu, and Alexandre Texier. He is currently the head coach for Boxers de Bordeaux of the Ligue Magnus. His international playing career was recognized with induction into the IIHF Hall of Fame in 2008.

== Playing career ==
Bozon began his career playing for the St. Jean Beavers in the Quebec Major Junior Hockey League followed by four years competing in his native France. Playing for the Grenoble Brûleurs de Loups, he won the French championship in 1991. He was then recruited by the St. Louis Blues and was used as a defensive-minded forward and occasionally on the scoring line with Brett Hull. After his time with the Blues, Bozon played professionally in Germany and Switzerland. In Germany, his Adler Mannheim team won the league championship in 1997, 1998 and 1999.

== International career ==
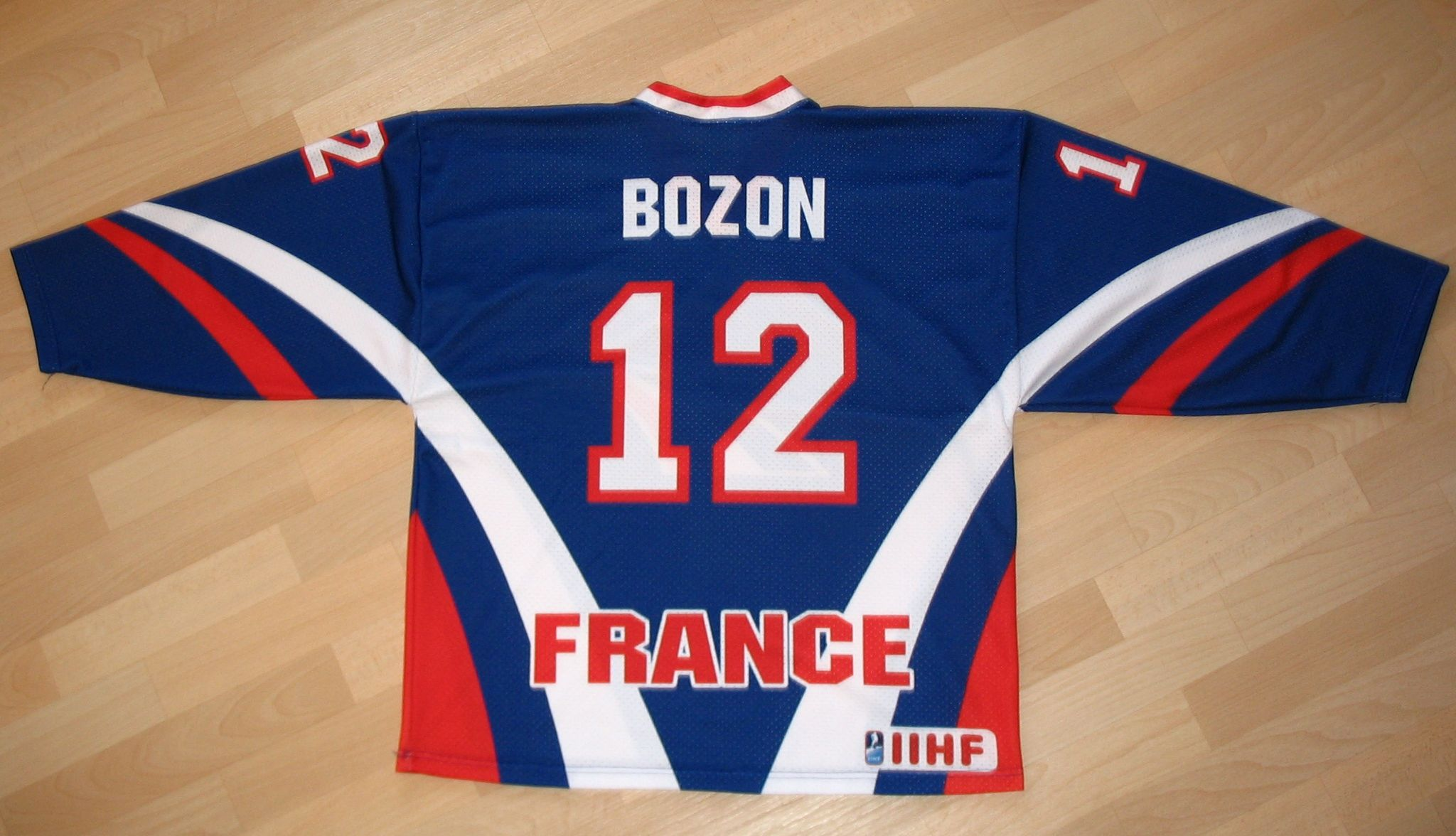
Bozon's France national team jersey

In addition to his professional career, Bozon appeared internationally for France, for which he competed in four Olympic Games. His international playing career was recognized with induction into the IIHF Hall of Fame in 2008. On July 14, 2009, Bozon was named the head coach of the French national junior ice hockey team.

== Family ==
Bozon is married to Hélène Barbier, who was an alpine skier. They have three children, sons Tim and Kévin, and daughter Allison. Both Tim and Kevin play professional hockey; Tim is with Genève-Servette HC of the National League and was selected by the Montreal Canadiens in the 2012 NHL entry draft, while Kevin is currently with EHC Winterthur of the Swiss League. Bozon's father, Alain Bozon, was also a hockey player, and was elected into the French Ice Hockey Hall of Fame in 2012.

== Career statistics ==
=== Regular season and playoffs ===
			Regular season					Playoffs
Season	Team	League	GP	G	A	Pts	PIM	GP	G	A	Pts	PIM
1984–85	Saint–Jean Castors	QMJHL	67	32	50	82	82	5	0	5	5	4
1985–86	Saint–Jean Castors	QMJHL	65	59	52	111	72	10	10	6	16	16
1985–86	Peoria Rivermen	IHL	—	—	—	—	—	5	1	0	1	0
1986–87	Peoria Rivermen	IHL	28	4	11	15	17	—	—	—	—	—
1986–87	Saint–Jean Castors	QMJHL	25	20	21	41	75	8	5	5	10	30
1987–88	Mont–Blanc HC	FRA	18	11	15	26	34	10	15	6	21	6
1988–89	Mont–Blanc HC	FRA	29	22	36	58	56	11	11	17	28	38
1989–90	Grenoble HC	FRA	36	45	38	83	34	6	4	3	7	2
1990–91	Grenoble HC	FRA	26	22	16	38	16	10	7	8	15	8
1991–92	Chamonix HC	FRA	22	30	19	49	40	12	18	1	19	—
1991–92	St. Louis Blues	NHL	9	1	3	4	4	6	1	0	1	27
1992–93	St. Louis Blues	NHL	54	6	6	12	55	9	1	0	1	0
1992–93	Peoria Rivermen	IHL	4	3	2	5	2	—	—	—	—	—
1993–94	St. Louis Blues	NHL	80	9	16	25	42	4	0	0	0	4
1994–95	St. Louis Blues	NHL	1	0	0	0	0	—	—	—	—	—
1994–95	Brûleurs de Loups	FRA	14	6	16	22	12	7	2	4	6	30
1995–96	HC La Chaux–de–Fonds	SUI.2	29	31	28	59	48	11	13	10	23	10
1996–97	Lausanne HC	SUI.2	23	17	15	32	89	—	—	—	—	—
1996–97	Adler Mannheim	DEL	22	11	6	17	8	9	6	10	16	0
1997–98	Adler Mannheim	DEL	42	20	17	37	40	10	5	5	10	16
1998–99	Adler Mannheim	DEL	51	14	30	44	66	12	4	5	9	30
1999–2000	HC Lugano	NLA	44	13	31	44	73	12	9	6	15	55
2000–01	HC Lugano	NLA	41	18	26	44	42	10	7	2	9	6
2001–02	Genève–Servette HC	SUI.2	31	24	35	59	22	12	10	11	21	12
2002–03	Genève–Servette HC	NLA	43	19	19	38	47	6	0	2	2	10
2003–04	Genève–Servette HC	NLA	43	12	28	40	18	6	1	0	1	4
2004–05	Genève–Servette HC	NLA	38	12	27	39	55	4	1	2	3	0
2005–06	Genève–Servette HC	NLA	9	2	0	2	6	—	—	—	—	—
FRA totals			145	136	140	276	192	56	57	39	96	84
NHL totals			144	16	25	41	101	19	2	0	2	31
NLA totals			218	76	131	207	241	38	18	12	30	75

=== International ===
Year	Team	Event	GP	G	A	Pts	PIM
1988	France	OG	6	3	2	5	0
1989	France	WC B	7	8	3	11	10
1990	France	WC B	7	4	2	6	4
1991	France	WC B	7	5	5	10	0
1992	France	OG	7	3	2	5	4
1992	France	WC	3	1	1	2	4
1994	France	WC	3	0	0	0	2
1995	France	WC	6	2	3	5	0
1996	France	WC	7	4	2	6	4
1997	France	WC	8	2	4	6	27
1998	France	OG	4	5	2	7	4
1998	France	WC	3	2	1	3	2
1999	France	WC	3	1	0	1	4
1999	France	WC Q	3	0	2	2	14
2000	France	WC	6	1	2	3	6
2001	France	OGQ	3	0	3	3	4
2001	France	WC D1	5	8	1	9	6
2002	France	OG	4	3	3	6	2
Senior totals			92	52	38	90	97
