= Christophe Ville =

French ice hockey player

- Born: 15 June 1963 (age 63) Dijon, France
- Height: 5 ft 11 in (180 cm)
- Weight: 176 lb (80 kg; 12 st 8 lb)
- Position: Center
- Shot: Left
- Played for: HC Saint-Gervais; Français Volants; Brûleurs de Loups; Chamonix HC; Devils Milano; HC CourmAosta
- National team: France
- Playing career: 1980–1998

Christophe Ville (born 15 June 1963) is a French former professional ice hockey centre. He competed in the men's tournaments at the 1988 Winter Olympics, the 1992 Winter Olympics and the 1994 Winter Olympics.
