= Per Hånberg =

Swedish ice hockey player

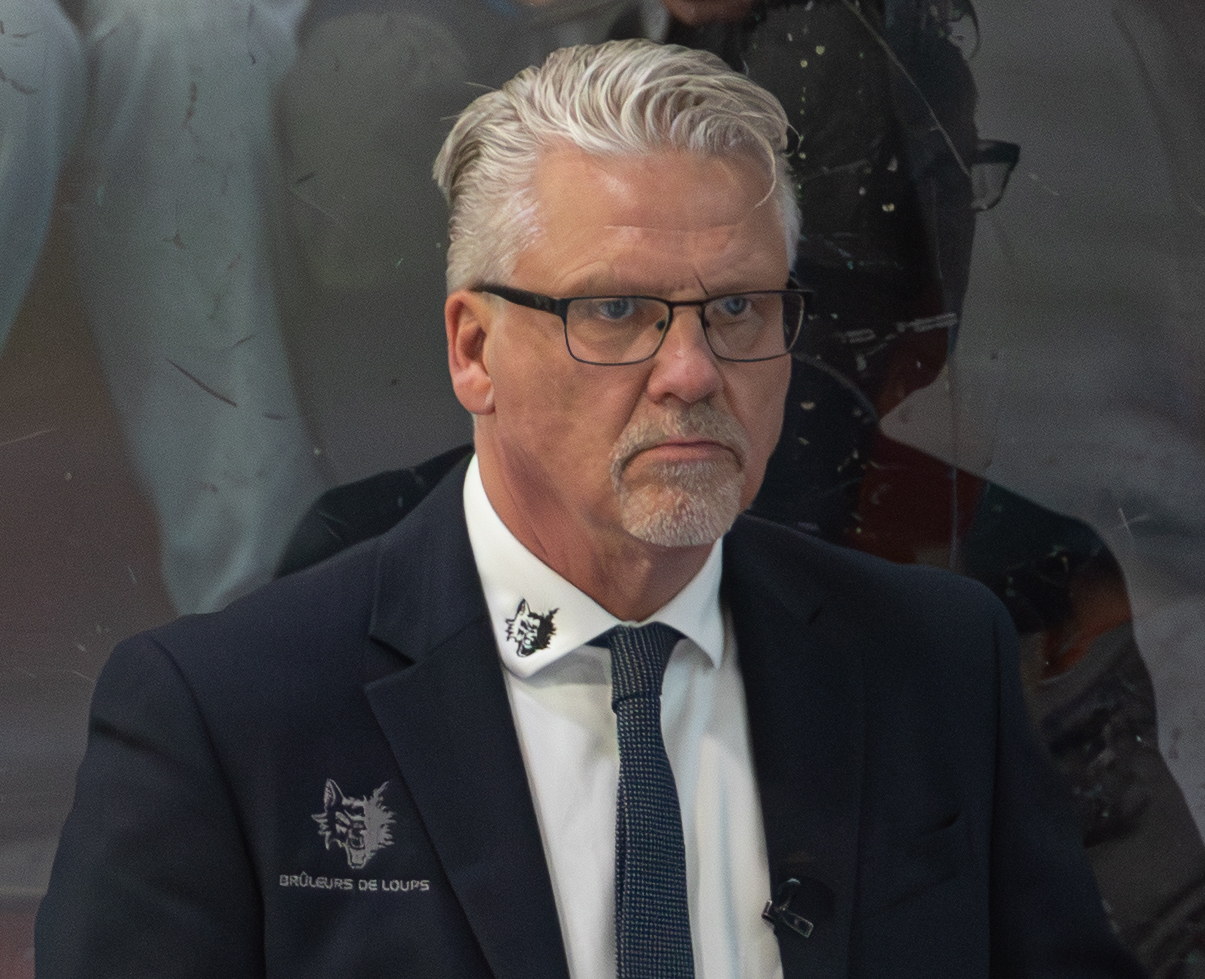
- Hånberg in 2025
- Born: February 10, 1967 (age 58); Stockholm, Sweden
- Height: 6 ft 0 in (183 cm)
- Weight: 205 lb (93 kg; 14 st 9 lb)
- Position: Forward
- Shot: Left
- Played for: AIK IF ( Elitserien)
- NHL draft: Undrafted
- Playing career: 1987–1999

Per Hånberg (born February 10, 1967) is a Swedish former professional ice hockey player. He is the head coach of the French Grenoble's Bruleurs de Loups team (fr:Grenoble métropole hockey 38) since May 28, 2024. Hånberg played with AIK IF during the 1987–88 Elitserien season.

On April 25, 2014, Hånberg was announced as the new head coach for Karlskrona HK, then of the Swedish HockeyAllsvenskan.
