= Pierre Pousse =

French ice hockey player and coach

- Born: February 27, 1966 (age 59) Strasbourg, France
- Height: 5 ft 11 in (180 cm)
- Weight: 176 lb (80 kg; 12 st 8 lb)
- Position: Right wing
- Shot: Right
- Played for: Ligue Magnus; Gothiques d'Amiens; Diables Rouges de Briançon
- National team: France
- NHL draft: Undrafted
- Playing career: 1983–2000

Pierre Pousse (born February 27, 1966) is a French former professional ice hockey player. He was a coach with the France national ice hockey team since 2004.

== International ==
Pousse competed for France in the 1988, 1992 and 1994 Winter Olympics. He also competed in the ice Hockey World Championships for France from 1992 to 1996.
