= Jean-Marc Djian =

French ice hockey player

Personal information
- Nationality: French
- Born: 29 March 1966 (age 58); La Tronche, France

Sport
- Sport: Ice hockey

Jean-Marc Djian (born 29 March 1966) is a French former ice hockey goaltender. He competed in the men's tournaments at the 1988 Winter Olympics and the 1992 Winter Olympics.
