= Patinoire Brown-Ferrand =

Hockey arena in Gap, France

- "La Blâche"
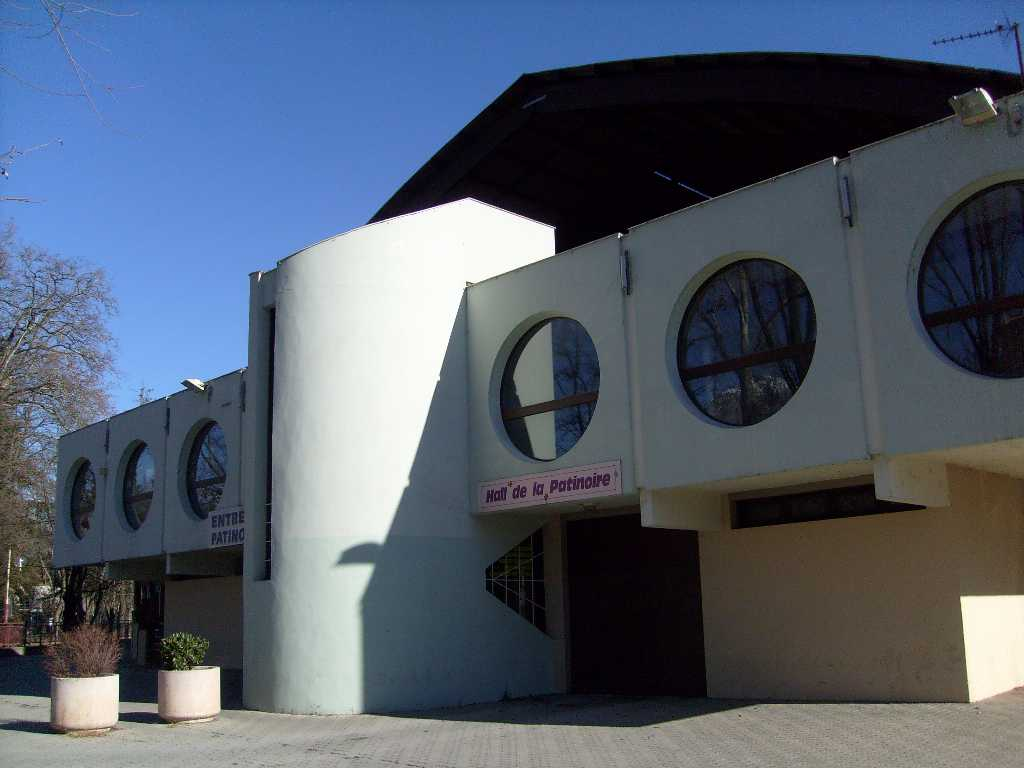
- Interactive map of Patinoire Brown-Ferrand
- Location: Patinoire Brown-Ferrand - La Blache BP 37; 05000 Gap
- Coordinates: 44°33′38″N 6°05′08″E
- Capacity: Hockey: 1800

Construction
- Opened: 1955
- Renovated: 1962, ice refrigeration and bleachers added 1972, roof erected 1977, more seating added 1982, dressing rooms and concession stand added 1985, lighting updated

Tenants
- Rapaces de Gap (hockey); Axel Gap (figure skating)

The Patinoire Brown-Ferrand (English: Brown-Ferrand Ice Rink) is a hockey arena in Gap, France. It was named for two Gapençais hockey players, Roger Brown and John Ferrand. Locally, it is also known as "La Blâche," for the neighborhood where the arena is located. It is the home rink of the Ligue Magnus team, the Rapaces de Gap (English: Gap Raptors),

== History ==
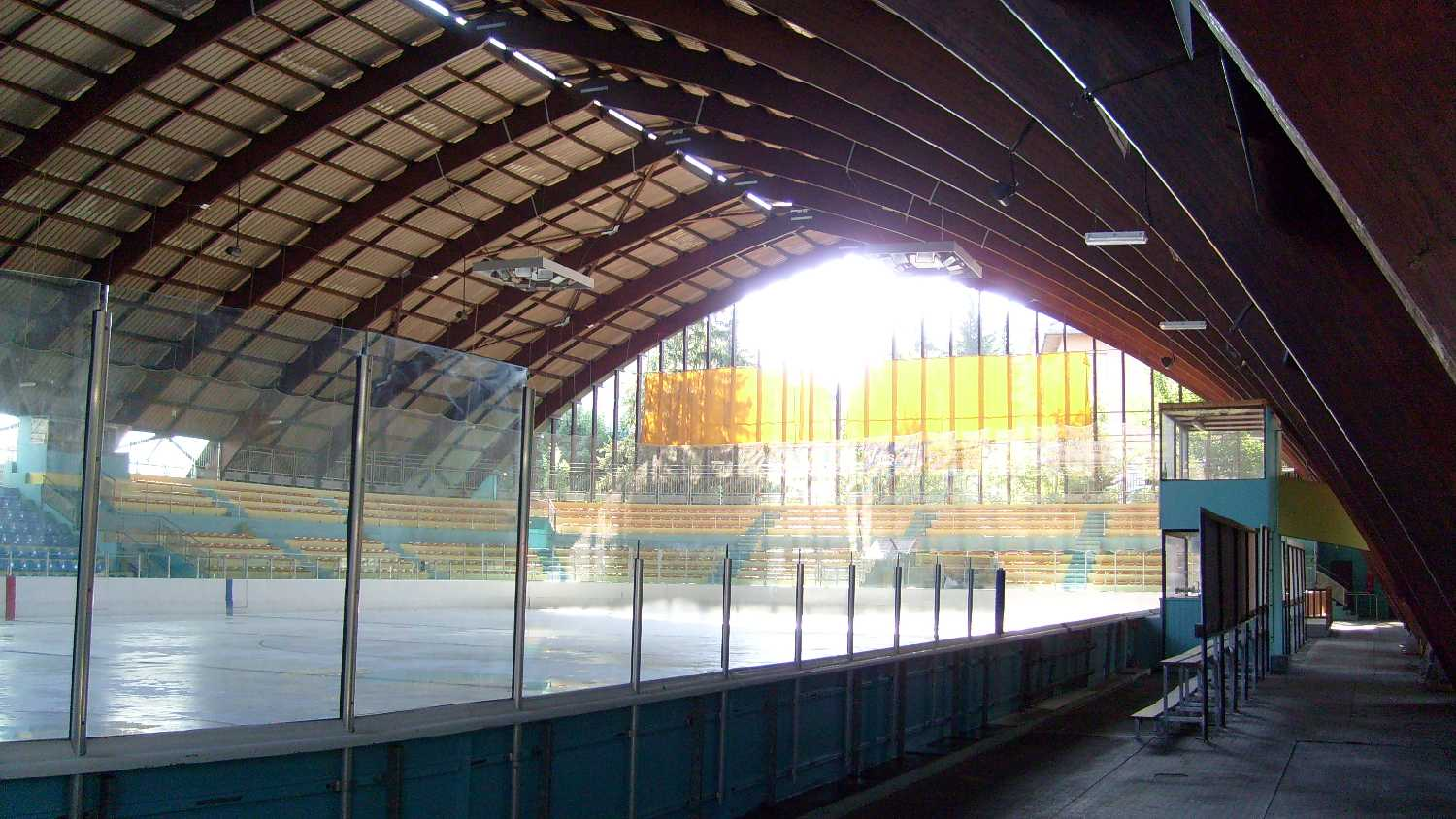
Inside the rink

The arena was opened in 1955, and renovated in several stages since then. In 1962 a refrigeration system (based on ammonia) was commissioned to produce artificial ice. The same year, the mayor gave the club a central forum and concrete bleachers. Until 1972, when the rink was covered by a roof resting on a laminated steel tray frame, the ice was directly subjected to natural weather. In 1977 the galleries were built between the central platform and the southeast corner. 5 years later, the current building was built, including dressing rooms and a bar upstairs. In 1985, the lighting was rebuilt and in 1987, work was undertaken to repair the slab and refrigeration.

== New Arena ==
Following an audit in 2005, the former mayor of Gap, Pierre Bernard-Reymond, formed a committee to discuss a new arena. In July 2007, the new arena was announced by Roger Didier. The project involves extending the existing ice rink and the creation of a complex of trails. The Patinoire Brown-Ferrand will be redesigned and enlarged, with the capacity increased to 2000 instead of 1800 seats, with spectators sitting all around the ice.

The new arena design features 5 luxury suites, 7 locker rooms, a public skating rink, gym, and a cafeteria/bar. In addition, it is designed to be a green-friendly structure, with all the heat generated in cooling the ice used to directly provide heat to other areas of the facility.

The construction is projected to be complete in August 2012, with opening scheduled for 1 September 2012.
