= Yves Crettenand =

French ice hockey player

Personal information
- Nationality: French
- Born: 29 April 1963 (age 61); Chamonix, France

Sport
- Sport: Ice hockey

Yves Crettenand (born 29 April 1963) is a French former ice hockey left winger. He competed in the men's tournament at the 1992 Winter Olympics.
