= 1983–84 Nationale A season =

French professional ice hockey season

The 1983–84 Nationale A season was the 63rd season of the Nationale A, the top level of ice hockey in France. 12 teams participated in the league, and Club des Sports de Megève won their first league title. Image Club d'Epinal was voluntarily relegated to the Nationale B due to financial issues.

== First round ==
| | Club | GP | W | T | L | GF | GA | Pts |
|---|---|---|---|---|---|---|---|---|
| 1. | Gap Hockey Club | 22 | 17 | 2 | 3 | 176 | 90 | 36 |
| 2. | Sporting Hockey Club Saint Gervais | 22 | 15 | 2 | 5 | 151 | 96 | 32 |
| 3. | CSG Grenoble | 22 | 12 | 5 | 5 | 151 | 98 | 29 |
| 4. | Club des Sports de Megève | 22 | 13 | 3 | 6 | 151 | 77 | 29 |
| 5. | Chamonix Hockey Club | 22 | 13 | 3 | 6 | 138 | 111 | 29 |
| 6. | Viry-Châtillon Essonne Hockey | 22 | 11 | 2 | 9 | 127 | 112 | 24 |
| 7. | Diables Rouges de Briançon | 22 | 10 | 1 | 11 | | | 21 |
| 8. | Ours de Villard-de-Lans | 22 | 9 | 2 | 11 | 121 | 139 | 20 |
| 9. | ASG Tours | 22 | 9 | 0 | 13 | 146 | 147 | 18 |
| 10. | Hockey Club de Caen | 22 | 4 | 3 | 15 | | | 11 |
| 11. | HC Amiens Somme | 22 | 3 | 3 | 16 | 93 | 201 | 9 |
| 12. | Image Club d’Épinal | 22 | 2 | 2 | 18 | 104 | 195 | 6 |

== Final round ==
| | Club | GP | W | T | L | GF | GA | Pts |
|---|---|---|---|---|---|---|---|---|
| 1. | Club des Sports de Megève | 36 | 26 | 4 | 6 | 270 | 117 | 56 |
| 2. | Gap Hockey Club | 36 | 25 | 3 | 8 | 287 | 169 | 53 |
| 3. | Sporting Hockey Club Saint Gervais | 36 | 25 | 2 | 9 | 275 | 167 | 52 |
| 4. | CSG Grenoble | 36 | 22 | 4 | 10 | 238 | 160 | 48 |
| 5. | Chamonix Hockey Club | 36 | 18 | 4 | 14 | 220 | 208 | 40 |
| 6. | Diables Rouges de Briançon | 36 | 15 | 3 | 18 | | | 33 |
| 7. | Viry-Châtillon Essonne Hockey | 36 | 12 | 3 | 21 | 168 | 218 | 27 |
| 8. | Ours de Villard-de-Lans | 36 | 10 | 3 | 23 | 167 | 257 | 23 |

== Relegation ==
| | Club | Pts |
|---|---|---|
| 1. | ASG Tours | 22 |
| 2. | Français Volants | 18 |
| 3. | HC Amiens Somme | 12 |
| 4. | Image Club d’Épinal | 9 |
| 5. | Hockey Club de Caen | 9 |
| 6. | Anglet Hormadi Élite | 7 |
| 7. | Corsaires de Dunkerque | 7 |

Hockey Club de Caen would have been relegated but remained in the Nationale A for the following season as Image Club d'Epinal voluntarily went down to the Nationale B.
