= Jacques Lacarrière (ice hockey) =

French ice hockey player

Personal information
- National team: France
- Born: 25 July 1906 Paris, France
- Died: 28 July 2005 (aged 99)

Sport
- Sport: Ice hockey

Jacques Lacarrière (25 July 1906 – 28 July 2005) was a French ice hockey player who competed in the 1928 Winter Olympics and 1936 Winter Olympics. Lacarrière and his son Philippe, were both inducted into the IIHF Hall of Fame.

== Career ==
In 1928, Lacarrière participated with the French team in the Olympic tournament. Eight years later, he was also a member of the French team in the 1936 Olympic tournament. He later established the Français Volants, a French ice hockey team, in 1933.

In 1998, his playing career earned him a selection in the second induction class of the IIHF Hall of Fame. When his son Philippe was inducted in 2018, the two became the second father-son pairing to be inducted into the IIHF Hall of Fame. Between 2007 and 2017, the Jacques Lacarrière Trophy was awarded to the winner of the Match des Champions. After 2018, it was awarded to the winners of the Ligue Magnus regular season.
