= 1977–78 Nationale A season =

French professional ice hockey season

The 1977–78 Nationle A season was the 57th season of the Nationale A, the top level of ice hockey in France. 10 teams participated in the league, and Gap Hockey Club won their second league title. Hockey Club de Caen was relegated to the Nationale B.

== Regular season ==
	Club	GP	W	T	L	GF	GA	Pts
1.	Gap Hockey Club	18	16	0	2	123	69	32
2.	Ours de Villard-de-Lans	18	12	2	4	92	66	26
3.	ASG Tours	18	10	1	7	98	84	21
4.	CSG Grenoble	18	10	0	8	97	83	20
5.	Club des Sports de Megève	18	8	2	8	78	80	18
6.	Viry-Châtillon Essonne Hockey	18	8	0	10	81	101	16
7.	Chamonix Hockey Club	18	6	3	9	91	88	15
8.	CPM Croix	18	6	3	9	64	97	15
9.	Sporting Hockey Club Saint Gervais	18	5	0	13	84	100	10
10.	Hockey Club de Caen	18	3	1	14	65	105	7

== Relegation ==
- Club des patineurs lyonnais - Sporting Hockey Club Saint Gervais 5:13/3:13
