= Damien Fleury =

French ice hockey player (born 1986)

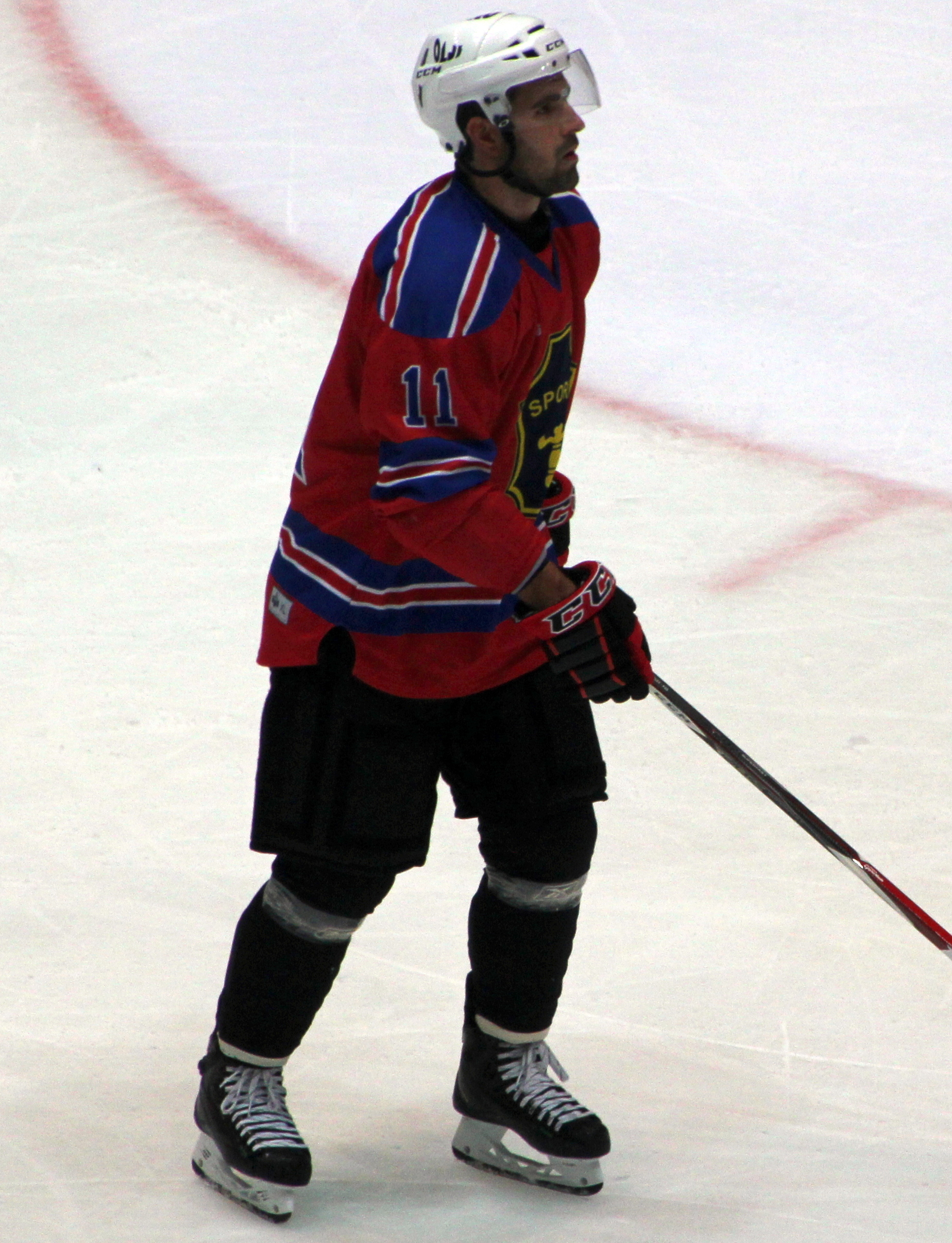
- Born: 1 February 1986 (age 39) Caen, France
- Height: 5 ft 11 in (180 cm)
- Weight: 185 lb (84 kg; 13 st 3 lb)
- Position: Forward
- Shoots: Right
- Ligue Magnus team Former teams: Brûleurs de Loups; Drakkars de Caen; Ours de Villard-de-Lans; Luleå HF; Timrå IK; Lausanne HC; Sport; Djurgårdens IF; Schwenninger Wild Wings; Kunlun Red Star; Lukko
- National team: France
- NHL draft: Undrafted
- Playing career: 2005–present

Damien Fleury (born 1 February 1986) is a French professional ice hockey forward who currently plays for Brûleurs de Loups in the Ligue Magnus as well as the French national team.

== Playing career ==
Fleury began his professional career in his native Ligue Magnus with his hometown team Drakkars de Caen. After tenures with Ours de Villard-de-Lans and Brûleurs de Loups of Grenoble, Fleury moved to Sweden in 2010 with VIK Västerås HK of the HockeyAllsvenskan. A year later, he moved to the top-tier Elitserien with spells at Luleå HF and Timrå IK before moving back down to HockeyAllsvenskan with Södertälje SK. He also had a brief spell in Switzerland's National League A with Lausanne HC.

In 2014, Fleury returned to Sweden's top-tier league, now called the Swedish Hockey League, with Djurgårgens IF after a mid-season transfer from Finnish Liiga club, Sport. On 16 April 2015, Fleury signed a one-year contract to join German club, Schwenninger Wild Wings of the DEL for the 2015–16 season. He left the Wild Wings upon the conclusion of the 2015–16 season and was one of the first players to join the newest member of the Kontinental Hockey League, the Chinese team Kunlun Red Star.

Fleury participated at the 2013 and 2011 IIHF World Championship as a member of the France men's national ice hockey team.
