= Daniel Maric =

French ice hockey player

Personal information
- Nationality: French
- Born: 11 June 1957 (age 67); Grenoble, France

Sport
- Sport: Ice hockey

Daniel Maric (born 11 June 1957) is a French former professional ice hockey goaltender. He competed in the men's tournament at the 1988 Winter Olympics.
