= Diables Rouges de Briançon =

- City: Briançon France
- League: Ligue Magnus (1982-1992) (2002-Present)
- Founded: 1934
- Home arena: Patinoire René Froger
- Colors: Red, white, black
- General manager: Christophe Lapointe
- Head coach: Pierre Bergeron
- Captain: Norbert Abramov; Dmitri Vozovik
- Website: https://www.diables-rouges.fr

Franchise history
- 1935-?: Club des Sports d'Hiver du Briançonnais
- ?-1975: Étoile Sportive Briançonnaise
- 1975-1990: Hockey Club Briançonnais
- 1990-present: Diables Rouges de Briançon

Previous logo

The Diables Rouges de Briançon ((in English): Briançon Red Devils) (Briançon Alpes Provence Hockey Club and before Hockey Club Briançon) is the ice hockey team of Briançon (Hautes-Alpes). Their home arena is the Patinoire René Froger.

== Awards and trophies ==
=== Honours ===
Coupe Magnus: (1)

- Winner: 2014.
- Finalist: 1988, 2008, 2009.

Coupe de France: (2)

- Winner: 2010, 2013.
- Finalist: 2005, 2006.

Coupe de la Ligue: (1)

- Winner: 2012.
- Finalist: 2008, 2009, 2011.

Match des Champions: (1)

- Winner: 2013.
- Finalist: 2009, 2014.

Coupe des As: (1)

- Winner: 1992.
- Finalist: .

Division 1:(1)

- Winner: 1997.

Division 2:(1)

- Winner: 1994.

Division 3:(1)

- Winner: 1993.

They won the Marcel Claret Trophy in 1982–83, 1983–84, 2009-10 et 2010–11.

== History ==
The club is founded in 1934. The team made its comeback in the Ligue Magnus since the 2002–2003 season.

== Players ==
=== Current roster ===
As of 9 November 2024.

| No. | Nat | Player | Pos | S/G | Age | Acquired | Birthplace |
|---|---|---|---|---|---|---|---|
| 79 | (France) | Norbert Abramov (C) | W | R | 33 | 2024 | Cergy, France |
| 20 | (France) | Benjamin Berard | LW | L | 27 | 2021 | Grenoble, France |
| 40 | (France) | Lucas Bonnardel (A) | C | L | 29 | 2023 | Briançon, France |
| 8 | (France) | Aurélien Chausserie-Laprée | D | L | 26 | 2023 | Bordeaux, France |
| 67 | (France) | Mathis Despatie | D | L | 23 | 2024 | Sainte-Agathe-des-Monts, Quebec, Canada |
| 16 | (Canada) | Chase Dubois | F | R | 28 | 2024 | Williams Lake, British Columbia, Canada |
| 14 | (France) | Quentin Fauchon (A) | RW | R | 33 | 2019 | Villeneuve-Saint-Georges, France |
| 10 | (Canada) | William Lemay | LW | L | 27 | 2024 | Marieville, Quebec, Canada |
| 76 | (Canada) | Wayne Létourneau | D | L | 28 | 2024 | Sherbrooke, Quebec, Canada |
| 44 | (Canada) | Conor MacEachern | D | L | 28 | 2024 | Charlottetown, Prince Edward Island, Canada |
| 34 | (Canada) | Griffen Outhouse | G | L | 28 | 2024 | Williams Lake, British Columbia, Canada |
| 88 | (France) | Yonis Penet | F | R | 22 | 2024 | Briançon, France |
| 54 | (Sweden) | William Persson | LW | L | 25 | 2024 | Björklinge, Sweden |
| 5 | (France) | Joran Reynaud | LW | L | 29 | 2024 | Montmorency, France |
| 73 | (Canada) | Sean Richards | LW | L | 27 | 2023 | St. Albert, Alberta, Canada |
| 91 | (Sweden) | Fredrik Strömgren (A) | C | L | 28 | 2024 | Strömsund, Sweden |
| 31 | (France) | Mathis Thirion | G | L | 21 | 2024 | Rouen, France |
| 18 | (France) | Lucas Villain | D | R | 25 | 2024 | Rouen, France |
| 77 | (France) | Gaëtan Villiot | W | L | 26 | 2022 | Briançon, France |
| 27 | (Russia) | Dmitri Vozovik (C) | D | L | 29 | 2024 | Moscow, Russia |
| 4 | (France) | Valère Vrielynck (A) | LW | L | 38 | 2022 | Reims, France |

=== Coaches ===
| Name | Nationality | Period |
|---|---|---|
| André Bermond | France | Before 1970 |
| Michel Tartarin | France | 1970–1972 |
| Roger Demment | United States | 1972–1975 |
| Jim King | Canada | 1975–1977 |
| Roger Demment | United States | 1977–1981 |
| André Lauzon | Canada | 1985–1987 |
| Nelson Tremblay | Canada | 1987–1989 |
| Jan Simun | Czechoslovakia | 1989 |
| Zdeněk Bláha | Czechoslovakia | 1989–1990 |
| Richard Sévigny | Canada | 1990–1991 |
| André Peloffy | CanadaFrance | 1991–1992 |
| Marc Peythieu | France | 1994–1996 |
| Michel Leblanc | CanadaFrance | 1996–1997 |
| Ari Salo | Finland | 1997–1998 |
| András Farkas | Hungary | 1998–1999 |
| Michel Leblanc | CanadaFrance | 1999–2002 |
| Juha Jokiharju | Finland | 2002–2003 |
| Philippe Combe | France | 2003 |
| Luciano Basile | CanadaItaly | 2003–2014 |
| Edo Terglav | Slovenia | 2014–2015 |
| Patric Wener | Sweden | 2015–2016 |
| Alexis Billard | France | January 2016 - April 2016 |
| Claude Devèze | Canada France | April 2016 - October 2019 |
| Eric Medeiros | Canada Portugal | November 2019 - 2021 |
| Daniel Sedlák | Slovakia | Since July 2021 |

== Presidents ==
List:

- Pierre Gravier (1935-?)
- Émile Roul
- Brochier
- René Froger (1941-?)
- Antoine Faure (1952-?)
- Georges Bermond-Gonnet (1958–1970)
- Yvon Peythieu (1970–1984)
- Jean-Paul Garnero (1984–1985)
- Bernard Voiron (1985–1987)
- Philippe Pacull (1987–1988)
- Christian Séard (1988–1989)
- Philippe Pacull (1989–1990)
- Robert de Caumont (1990–1991)
- Philippe Pacull (1993–1998)
- Bernard Rouillard (1999)
- Jean-Pierre Bortino (1999–2001)
- Alain Bayrou (2001 – July 2009)
- Jean-Paul Garnero (July 2009 – Sep 2010)
- Sébastien Sode & Luc Rougny (Sep 2010 - Jan 2015)
- Guillaume Lebigot & Luc Rougny (Jan-Sep 2015)
- Guillaume Lebigot (since Sep 2015)

== Players ==
=== Awards ===
| Year | Name | Nationality | Trophy |
|---|---|---|---|
| 1988 | Georges Roul | (France) | Jean-Pierre Graff Trophy |
| 1989 | André Côté | (Canada) (France) | Charles Ramsey Trophy |
| 1988 | Petri Ylönen | (Finland) (France) | Jean Ferrand Trophy |
| 1992 | Peter Almasy | (Slovakia) (France) | Raymond Dewas Trophy |
| 1991 | Corrado Micalef | (Canada) Italy | Jean Ferrand Trophy |
| 2009 | Tommi Satosaari | (Finland) | Jean Ferrand Trophy |
| 2009 | Jean-François Dufour | (Canada) | Charles Ramsey Trophy |
| 2010 | Ramón Sopko | (Slovakia) | Jean Ferrand Trophy |
| 2011 | Loïc Lampérier | (France) | Jean-Pierre Graff Trophy |
| 2013 | Marc-André Bernier | (Canada) | Trophy of the press : Foreign MVP |

=== Captains ===
| Name | Nationality | Period |
|---|---|---|
| Georges Bermond-Gonnet | (France) | 1940 - ? |
| Maurice Roul | (France) | ?-1973 |
| Gilles Gaillard | (France) | 1973–1983 |
| Yvon Peythieu | (France) | ? |
| Marc Peythieu | (France) | ? |
| Gilles Chevalier | (France) | ? |
| Dennis Murphy | (United States) (France) | ? |
| Georges Roul | (France) | 1993–1998 |
| Christophe Robert | (France) | ? |
| Éric Blais | (France) | 2000–2005 |
| Jean-François Jodoin | (Canada) (France) | 2005–2006 |
| Edo Terglav | (Slovenia) | 2006–2012 |
| Marc-André Bernier | (Canada) | 2012–2015 |
| Tomas Larsson | (Sweden) | 2015–2016 |

=== NHL players ===
| Name | Nationality | Games in NHL | Period |
|---|---|---|---|
| Mark Rycroft | (Canada) | 229 games | 2004–2005 |
| Corrado Micalef | (Canada) (Italy) | 116 games | 1990–1991 |
| Michel Galarneau | (Canada) (France) | 78 games | 1991–1992 |
| Jean-Marc Gaulin | (Canada) (France) | 27 games | 1991–1992 |
| Rémi Royer | (Canada) | 18 games | 2006–2007 |
| François Groleau | (Canada) | 8 games | 2008–2010 |
| Philippe DeRouville | (Canada) | 3 games | 2003–2004 |
