= Brûleurs de Loups =

Professional ice hockey in Grenoble, France

- City: Grenoble, France
- League: Ligue Magnus; 2000–present
- Founded: 1963; 63 years ago
- Home arena: Patinoire Polesud (4208 seats)
- Colors: Blue, Red
- Owner: Jacques Reboh
- Head coach: Per Hånberg
- Captain: Sacha Treille
- Website: www.bruleursdeloups.fr

Franchise history
- 1963–1966: Grenoble Hockey Club
- 1966–1969: Ours dauphinois
- 1969–1972: Grenoble Hockey Club
- 1972–1991: Club des Sports de Glace de Grenoble
- 1991–present: Brûleurs de Loups

Championships
- Playoff championships: 1981, 1982, 1991, 1998, 2007, 2009, 2019, 2022

The Brûleurs de Loups (French for Wolf Burners) are a professional ice hockey team that play in Grenoble, France.

== History ==
The club was founded in 1963 under the name Grenoble Hockey Club. Since 1992, the club has been known as the Brûleurs de Loups.

The Brûleurs de Loups hockey team plays in the Ligue Magnus, the highest level in France. They have won the championship nine times (1981, 1982, 1991, 1998, 2007, 2009, 2019, 2022, 2025), the French Cup six times (1994, 2008, 2009, 2017, 2023, 2024) and the League Cup four times (2007, 2009, 2011, 2015).

Former Montreal Canadiens and Chicago Blackhawks goaltender Cristobal Huet played for Grenoble from the beginning of his career until 1998. Montreal Canadiens forward Alexandre Texier started his career in Grenoble as well. They were both born in nearby Saint-Martin-d'Hères.

In February 2023, the Brûleurs de Loups secured their first place in the Magnus League and won the Jacques Lacarrière Trophy.

== Current roster ==
Updated 10 November 2024.

No.	Nat	Player	Pos	S/G	Age	Acquired	Birthplace
26	(France)	Matias Bachelet	C	L	22	2023	Grenoble, France
49	(Canada)	François Beauchemin	C	L	30	2024	Métis-sur-Mer, Quebec, Canada
16	(Sweden)	Alexis Binner	D	L	27	2024	Stocksund, Sweden
94	(Canada)	Christophe Boivin	LW	L	30	2024	Quebec City, Quebec, Canada
72	(France)	Pierre Crinon	D	L	30	2021	Reims, France
3	(France)	Aurélien Dair	C	R	26	2019	Chambéry, France
17	(Canada)	Nicolas Deschamps (A)	W	L	36	2021	LaSalle, Quebec, Canada
96	(France)	Loïc Farnier	LW	L	29	2023	Romans-sur-Isère, France
27	(France)	Antoine Fertin	D	R	22	2024	La Tronche, France
10	(France)	Damien Fleury (A)	RW	R	40	2018	Caen, France
5	(France)	Valentin Grossetete	RW	L	22	2023	Clermont-Ferrand, France
88	(France)	Théo Gueurif	C	L	23	2024	Saint-Martin-d'Hères, France
12	(Canada)	Jarod Hilderman	D	R	28	2024	Calgary, Alberta, Canada
18	(France)	Adel Koudri	C	R	26	2019	Annecy, France
22	(France)	Guillaume Leclerc	C	L	30	2024	Besançon, France
92	(Canada)	Alexandre Mallet	RW	R	33	2024	Amqui, Quebec, Canada
98	(France)	Hugo Nogaretto	LW	R	20	2024	Grenoble, France
69	(Slovenia)	Matija Pintarič	G	L	36	2024	Maribor, SFR Yugoslavia
6	(Canada)	Samuel Régis	D	L	24	2024	Châteauguay, Quebec, Canada
23	(France)	Charles Schmitt	D	R	24	2023	Montpellier, France
4	(Canada)	Kyle Shearer-Hardy (A)	D	L	37	2016	Montréal, Quebec, Canada
44	(Canada)	Jordon Southorn	D	L	35	2024	Montréal, Quebec, Canada
30	(Czech Republic)	Jakub Štěpánek	G	L	39	2021	Vsetín, Czechoslovakia
77	(France)	Sacha Treille (C)	LW	L	38	2018	Grenoble, France

== Notable former players ==
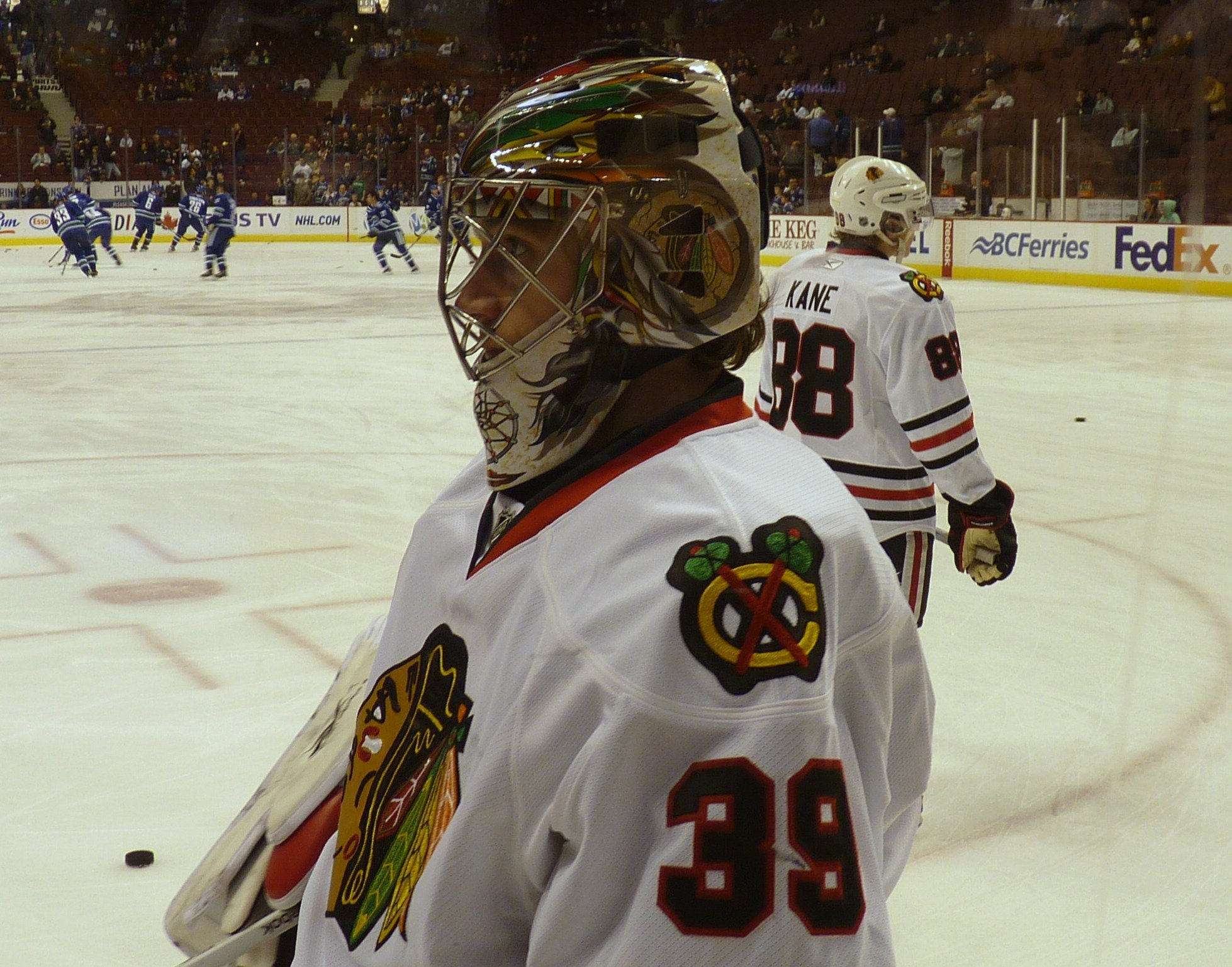
Cristobal Huet

(France)

- Philippe Bozon
- Cristobal Huet
- Robert Ouellet
- Jean-Philippe Lemoine
- Christian Pouget
- Eddy Ferhi
- Alexandre Texier

(Canada)

- Larry Huras
- Réjean Cloutier
- Sylvain Locas
- Éric Chouinard
- Alexandre Giroux

(Russia)

- Vadim Bekbulatov

(Czech Republic)

- Bohuslav Ebermann

== Trophies and awards ==
- Ligue Magnus (French Championship):
  - (x9) 1981, 1982, 1991, 1998, 2007, 2009, 2019, 2022, 2025
  - (x9) 1967, 1968, 1977, 1983, 1990, 2004, 2012, 2018, 2023
- French Cup:
  - (x6) 1994, 2008, 2009, 2017, 2023, 2024
  - (x2) 2004, 2016
- League Cup:
  - (x4) 2007, 2009, 2011, 2015
  - (x1) 2010
- Match of Champions:
  - (x4) 2008, 2009, 2010, 2017
  - (x1) 2007
