= 2017–18 Ligue Magnus season =

2017–18 Ligue Magnus
- League: Ligue Magnus
- Sport: Ice hockey
- Duration: 10 September 2017 – 27 March 2018
- Teams: 12

Regular season
- Best record: Brûleurs de Loups
- Runners-up: Dragons de Rouen
- Relegated to Division 1: Étoile Noire de Strasbourg

Playoffs
- Finals champions: Dragons de Rouen
- Runners-up: Brûleurs de Loups

Ligue Magnus seasons
- ← 2016–17 2018–19 →

The 2017–18 Ligue Magnus season was the 97th season of the Ligue Magnus, the top level of ice hockey in France. The regular season ran from 10 September 2017 to 20 February 2018. The Dragons de Rouen finished atop the standings. The postseason ran from 23 February to 27 March 2018. The Dragons de Rouen defeated the Brûleurs de Loups 4 games to 0 for the league championship. Étoile Noire de Strasbourg was relegated to Division 1 at the end of the season.

== Membership changes ==
- Pionniers de Chamonix-Morzine was scheduled to be relegated to Division 1. However, after the season, Ducs de Dijon declared bankruptcy and were removed from the league. As a result, Chamonix-Morzine remained in the league while Scorpions de Mulhouse replaced Dijon.
- The Pionniers de Chamonix-Morzine was dissolved when the two parent teams (Pionniers de Chamonix Mont-Blanc and Pingouins de Morzine-Avoriaz) ended their one-year merger. Chamonix Mont-Blanc remained in Ligue Magnus while Morzine-Avoriaz became members of Division 1.

== Teams ==
2017–18 Ligue Magnus team map

Team	City	Arena	Coach
Gothiques d'Amiens	Amiens	Coliséum	(Canada) Mario Richer
Ducs d'Angers	Angers	IceParc	(Canada) Brennan Sonne
Boxers de Bordeaux	Bordeaux	Patinoire de Mériadeck	(France) Philippe Bozon
Pionniers de Chamonix Mont-Blanc	Chamonix	Centre Sportif Richard Bozon	(Finland) Heikki Leime
Gamyo Épinal	Épinal	Patinoire de Poissompré	(Canada) Brad Gratton
Rapaces de Gap	Gap	Alp'Arena	(Canada) Luciano Basile
Brûleurs de Loups	Grenoble	Patinoire Pole Sud	(Slovenia) Edo Terglav
LHC Les Lions	Lyon	Patinoire Charlemagne	(Slovakia) Mitja Šivic
Scorpions de Mulhouse	Mulhouse	Patinoire de l'Illberg	(Sweden) Christer Eriksson
Aigles de Nice	Nice	Patinoire Jean Bouin	(Slovakia) Stanislav Sutor
Dragons de Rouen	Rouen	Centre sportif Guy-Boissière	(France) Fabrice Lhenry
Étoile Noire de Strasbourg	Strasbourg	Patinoire Iceberg	(Canada) Daniel Bourdages

== Regular season ==
=== Standings ===
Pos	Team	Pld	W	OTW	OTL	L	GF	GA	GD	Pts	Qualification
1	Brûleurs de Loups	44	33	1	1	9	194	108	+86	102	Qualification to Play-offs
2	Dragons de Rouen	44	30	3	2	9	181	108	+73	98	Qualification to Play-offs
3	Rapaces de Gap	44	22	5	3	14	154	131	+23	79	Qualification to Play-offs
4	Gothiques d'Amiens	44	20	7	4	13	143	108	+35	78	Qualification to Play-offs
5	LHC Les Lions	44	21	4	5	14	146	137	+9	76	Qualification to Play-offs
6	Boxers de Bordeaux	44	21	4	2	17	164	127	+37	73	Qualification to Play-offs
7	Ducs d'Angers	44	18	4	9	13	138	136	+2	71	Qualification to Play-offs
8	Scorpions de Mulhouse	44	11	9	4	20	135	151	−16	55	Qualification to Play-offs
9	Aigles de Nice	44	16	3	1	24	126	157	−31	55	Qualification to Play Out
10	Gamyo Épinal	44	16	2	2	24	127	148	−21	54	Qualification to Play Out
11	Pionniers de Chamonix Mont-Blanc	44	8	2	4	30	93	178	−85	32	Qualification to Play Out
12	Étoile Noire de Strasbourg	44	4	0	7	33	91	203	−112	19	Qualification to Play Out

Updated to match(es) played on unknown. Source: Ligue Magnus
Rules for classification: 1) Points; 2) Head-to-head points.

=== Statistics ===
==== Scoring leaders ====
Player	Team	Pos	GP	G	A	Pts	PIM
(Canada) Alexandre Giroux	Brûleurs de Loups	LW/RW	44	25	33	58	28
(France) Julien Correia	LHC Les Lions	F	44	18	40	58	24
(Canada) Joël Champagne	Brûleurs de Loups	C	44	27	29	56	52
(Canada) Marc-André Thinel	Dragons de Rouen	LW/RW	44	18	38	56	24
(Slovenia) David Rodman	Brûleurs de Loups	LW/RW	38	11	45	56	38
(France) Loïc Lampérier	Dragons de Rouen	C/LW	44	22	32	54	42
(Canada) Danick Bouchard	Ducs d'Angers	LW/RW	44	23	29	52	18
(Canada) Tommy Giroux	Gothiques d'Amiens	LW	44	24	27	51	6
(Slovenia) Boštjan Goličič	Brûleurs de Loups	C/LW	37	19	31	50	20
(Canada) Andrew Johnston	Pionniers de Chamonix Mont-Blanc	C/LW	44	18	32	50	38

==== Leading goaltenders ====
The following goaltenders led the league in goals against average, provided that they have played at least 1/3 of their team's minutes.

Player	Team	GP	TOI	W	L	GA	SO	SV%	GAA
(Czech Republic) Lukáš Horák	Brûleurs de Loups	33	1944	26	7	65	6	.921	2.01
(France) Henri-Corentin Buysse	Gothiques d'Amiens	39	2356	25	13	83	3	.919	2.11
(Slovenia) Matija Pintarič	Dragons de Rouen	38	2155	31	7	80	5	.920	2.23
(France) Ronan Quemener	Boxers de Bordeaux	16	961	9	7	39	1	.921	2.44
(United States) Jeff Lerg	Rapaces de Gap	38	2273	25	13	104	1	.901	2.75

== Playoffs ==
=== Championship ===
Quarterfinals (best-of-7)
1	Brûleurs de Loups	1	2*	2	5	3	6	-
8	Scorpions de Mulhouse	3	1	3*	2	2	2	-
2	Dragons de Rouen	4	2	3	4	3	-	-
7	Ducs d'Angers	0	3	0	2	2	-	-
(Pairings are re-seeded after the first round)
3	Rapaces de Gap	2	3	1	3	-	-	-
6	Boxers de Bordeaux	3	5	3	4	-	-	-
4	Gothiques d'Amiens	3**	1	5	5*	3*	4	-
5	LHC Les Lions	2	4	7	4	2	3	-

Semifinals (best-of-7)
1	Brûleurs de Loups	5	3	5	2	2	3*	7
6	Boxers de Bordeaux	3	4*	3	3*	3*	2	3
2	Dragons de Rouen	0	2	2	4	1	3	-
4	Gothiques d'Amiens	1	1	3**	1	0	2	-

Championship (best-of-7)
1	Brûleurs de Loups	3	0	3	4	-	-	-
2	Dragons de Rouen	4	3	4*	5*	-	-	-

Note: * denotes overtime
Note: ** denotes overtime and shootout

=== Relegation ===
Home \ Away	CHA	EPI	NIC	STR	CHA	EPI	NIC	STR
Pionniers de Chamonix Mont-Blanc	—	4–6	3–5	0–2	—	2–1	3–5	0–7
Gamyo Épinal	6–4	—	6–4	3–6	1–2	—	1–10	3–2
Aigles de Nice	5–3	4–6	—	1–5	5–3	10–1	—	1–3
Étoile Noire de Strasbourg	2–0	6–3	5–1	—	7–0	2–3	3–1	—

Updated to match(es) played on Final. Source: Ligue Magnus
Legend: Blue = home team win; Yellow = draw; Red = away team win.

Pos	Team	Pld	W	OTW	OTL	L	GF	GA	GD	Pts	Qualification
1	Gamyo Épinal (Note: Teams retained their points in common games from the regular season.)	6	3	0	0	3	20	28	−8	32	Saved
2	Aigles de Nice	6	3	0	0	3	26	21	+5	29	Saved
3	Pionniers de Chamonix Mont-Blanc	6	1	0	0	5	12	26	−14	24	Saved
4	Étoile Noire de Strasbourg	6	5	0	0	1	25	8	+17	23	Relegated

Updated to match(es) played on unknown. Source: Ligue Magnus
Rules for classification: 1) Points; 2) Head-to-head points.
