= Kévin Hecquefeuille =

French ice hockey coach and former player

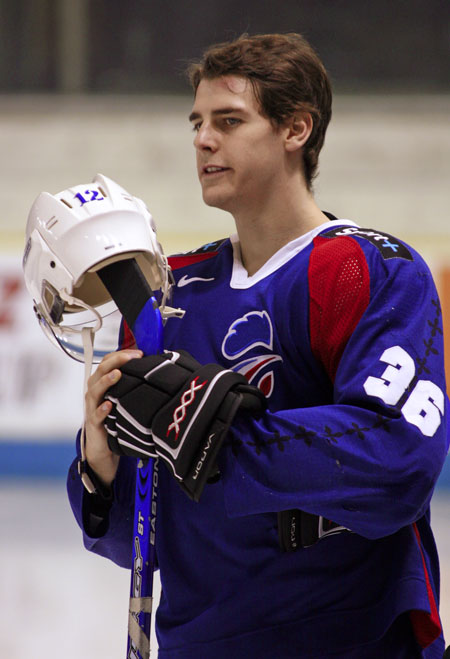
- Hecquefeuille in 2007
- Born: 20 November 1984 (age 41) Amiens, France
- Height: 5 ft 11 in (180 cm)
- Weight: 185 lb (84 kg; 13 st 3 lb)
- Position: Defenseman
- Shot: Right
- Played for: Scorpions de Mulhouse; Gothiques d'Amiens; Brûleurs de Loups; Nybro Vikings; Kölner Haie; Genève-Servette HC; Karlskrona HK; SCL Tigers; EHC Kloten; HC La Chaux-de-Fonds
- National team: France
- Playing career: 2002–2022

Kévin Hecquefeuille (born 20 November 1984) is a French ice hockey coach in the role of assistant for the EHC Visp in Switzerland Swiss League. He previously played as a defenseman, in a career that lasted from 2002 to 2022. Internationally Hecquefeuille played for the French national team in multiple World Championships.

== Career ==
Hecquefeuille played the majority of his early career in the French Ligue Magnus for Les Gothiques d'Amiens and Les Brûleurs de Loups. In 2003, Kévin won the Jean-Pierre Graff Trophy as the best rookie in the Ligue Magnus.

Beginning in 2008, he took his game abroad, playing in countries like Sweden (Nybro Vikings IF, Karlskrona HK), Germany (Kölner Haie), and Switzerland (Genève-Servette HC, SCL Tigers) in the following years. He worked out with the Vienna Capitals in November 2016, but left the Austrian club after four days for personal reasons.

On 18 December 2016 he was offered a PTO by EHC Kloten of the National League A (NLA) and was then signed to a short-term contract as a replacement for injured Bobby Sanguinetti. He left Kloten when his contract expired in January 2017.

On 24 January 2017 he joined HC La Chaux-de-Fonds for the remainder of the 2016–17 season.

He also played 19 years for the French national team.

He retired from playing in 2022, and on 28 March 2022 became the coach of Scorpions de Mulhouse.

== Career statistics ==
=== Regular season and playoffs ===
			Regular season					Playoffs
Season	Team	League	GP	G	A	Pts	PIM	GP	G	A	Pts	PIM
2002–03	Gothiques d'Amiens	FRA	24	6	6	12	18	—	—	—	—	—
2003–04	Gothiques d'Amiens	FRA-2	2	1	2	3	4	—	—	—	—	—
2003–04	Gothiques d'Amiens	FRA	22	1	4	5	14	10	1	3	4	10
2004–05	Brûleurs de Loups	FRA	28	4	7	11	16	12	1	0	1	4
2005–06	Brûleurs de Loups	FRA	22	4	14	18	16	7	1	3	4	16
2006–07	Brûleurs de Loups	FRA	26	10	17	27	30	12	4	3	7	42
2007–08	Brûleurs de Loups	FRA	26	10	12	22	30	6	2	1	3	4
2008–09	Nybro Vikings	SWE-2	41	7	11	18	54	—	—	—	—	—
2009–10	Kölner Haie	DEL	51	5	11	16	57	3	0	1	1	2
2010–11	Gothiques d'Amiens	FRA	26	3	24	27	60	9	6	5	11	24
2011–12	Genève-Servette HC	NLA	20	0	6	6	12	—	—	—	—	—
2011–12	Lausanne HC	NLB	1	0	0	0	0	—	—	—	—	—
2012–13	Genève-Servette HC	NLA	21	3	5	8	10	—	—	—	—	—
2012–13	Karlskrona HK	SWE-2	24	4	15	19	20	—	—	—	—	—
2013–14	Gothiques d'Amiens	FRA	1	0	0	0	0	—	—	—	—	—
2013–14	SCL Tigers	NLB	34	8	14	22	14	12	1	6	7	6
2014–15	SCL Tigers	NLB	31	9	16	25	26	15	7	8	15	26
2015–16	SCL Tigers	NLA	31	6	7	13	16	—	—	—	—	—
2016–17	Gothiques d'Amiens	FRA	5	0	5	5	6	—	—	—	—	—
2016–17	EHC Kloten	NLA	11	1	1	2	8	—	—	—	—	—
2016–17	HC La Chaux-de-Fonds	NLB	6	2	3	5	6	10	2	11	13	18
2017–18	Scorpions de Mulhouse	FRA	39	6	22	28	73	—	—	—	—	—
2017–18	IK Pantern	SWE-2	6	0	1	1	2	—	—	—	—	—
2018–19	Scorpions de Mulhouse	FRA	43	8	25	33	56	—	—	—	—	—
2019–20	Scorpions de Mulhouse	FRA	23	4	13	17	18	7	1	3	4	0
2020–21	Scorpions de Mulhouse	FRA	21	3	8	11	18	—	—	—	—	—
2021–22	Scorpions de Mulhouse	FRA	44	4	12	16	38	—	—	—	—	—
FRA totals			350	63	169	232	397	75	16	25	41	108

=== International ===
Year	Team	Event	GP	G	A	Pts	PIM
2001	France	U18-DII	3	1	2	3	4
2002	France	U18-DII	5	4	5	9	6
2003	France	WJC-DI	5	0	1	1	4
2004	France	WJC-DI	5	2	1	3	2
2005	France	WC-DI	5	1	1	2	8
2006	France	WC-DI	5	3	1	4	6
2007	France	WC-DI	5	0	0	0	4
2008	France	WC	5	0	0	0	4
2009	France	WC	6	1	1	2	8
2010	France	WC	6	0	1	1	6
2011	France	WC	6	1	3	4	4
2012	France	WC	7	3	1	4	4
2013	France	WC	7	1	2	3	2
2015	France	WC	7	1	2	3	6
2017	France	WC	7	0	0	0	2
2018	France	WC	7	0	4	4	2
2019	France	WC	7	0	3	3	2
Junior totals			18	7	9	16	16
Senior totals			80	11	19	30	58
