= Sacha Treille =

French ice hockey player (born 1987)

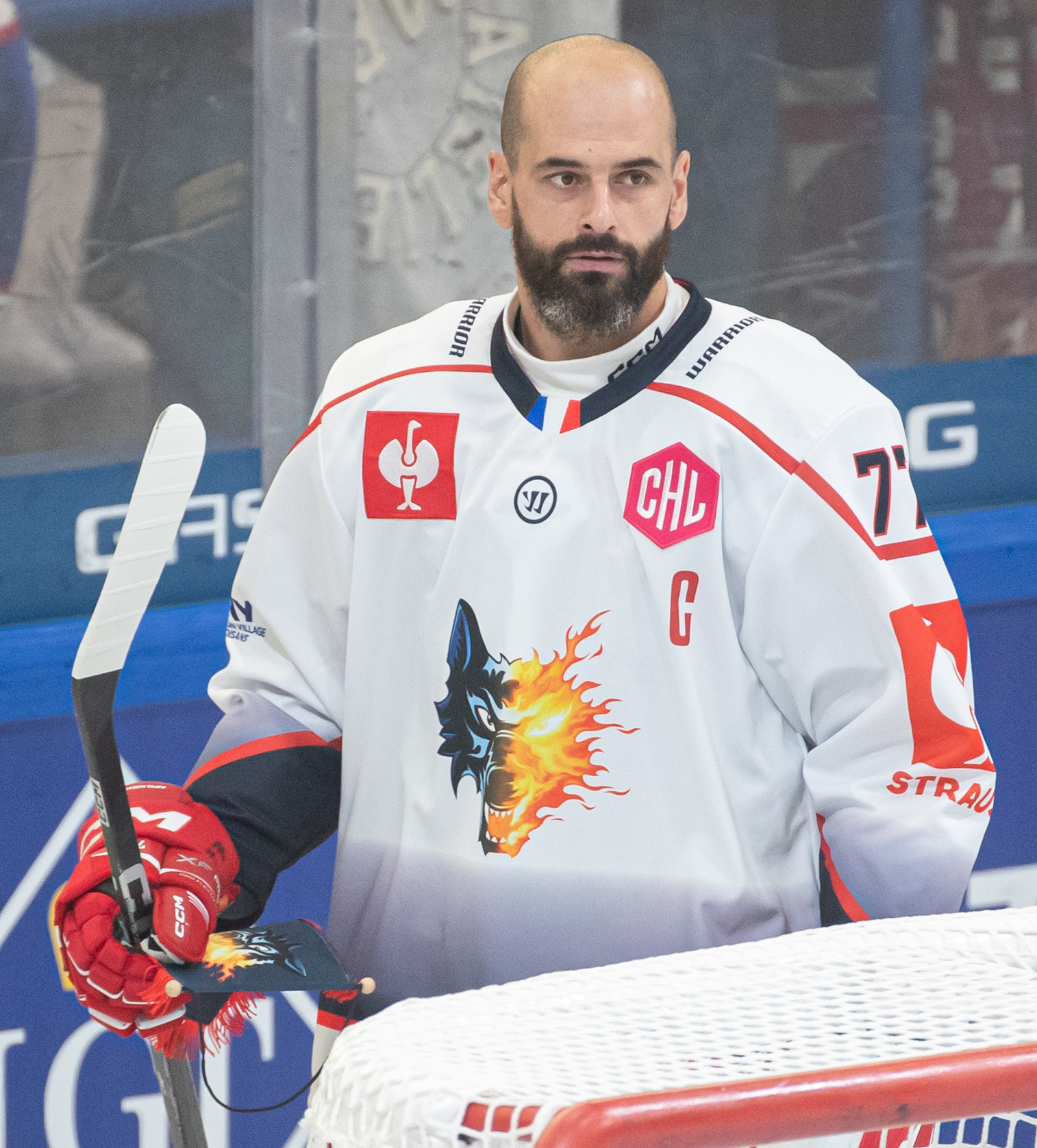
- Born: 6 November 1987 (age 38) Grenoble, France
- Height: 6 ft 4 in (193 cm)
- Weight: 209 lb (95 kg; 14 st 13 lb)
- Position: Winger
- Shoots: Left
- LM team Former teams: Brûleurs de Loups; Färjestad BK; Malmö Redhawks; HC Kladno; HC Sparta Praha; Straubing Tigers; Dragons de Rouen; HC Dynamo Pardubice
- National team: France
- Playing career: 2005–present

Sacha Treille (6 November 1987) is a French professional ice hockey player who is a winger for Brûleurs de Loups of the Ligue Magnus.

== Playing career ==
Treille formerly played in Sweden with Malmö Redhawks of the Swedish HockeyAllsvenskan. Treille has also played for the Nybro Vikings and Bofors IK of HockeyAllsvenskan, as well as Färjestads BK of the Elitserien, the top league in Sweden, and the Brûleurs de Loups of the French Ligue Magnus, the top league in France. In 2007, Sacha won the Jean-Pierre Graff Trophy as the best rookie in the Ligue Magnus. In 31. May 2017, he signed a contract with HC Dynamo Pardubice. In Czech Extraliga he also played in HC Sparta Prague and HC Kladno.

On 17 April 2020, he signed a contract extension with Brûleurs de Loups.

== International play ==
Treille has also played for the French national team in several international tournaments.

== Personal life ==
His brother, Yorick Treille, is also an ice hockey player, and has played for the French national team.

== Career statistics ==
=== Regular season and playoffs ===
			Regular season					Playoffs
Season	Team	League	GP	G	A	Pts	PIM	GP	G	A	Pts	PIM
2003–04	Brûleurs de Loups U18	France U18	16	18	9	27	30	—	—	—	—	—
2003–04	Brûleurs de Loups U22	France U22	18	3	4	7	52	2	1	0	1	14
2004–05	Brûleurs de Loups U18	France U18	7	11	7	18	20	5	2	3	5	36
2004–05	Brûleurs de Loups U22	France U22	7	3	4	7	30	—	—	—	—	—
2005–06	Brûleurs de Loups U22	France U22	2	3	5	8	12	—	—	—	—	—
2005–06	Brûleurs de Loups	Ligue Magnus	17	2	0	2	2	3	0	0	0	0
2006–07	Brûleurs de Loups	Ligue Magnus	25	6	5	11	36	12	2	0	2	24
2007–08	Brûleurs de Loups U22	France U22	1	1	1	2	29	—	—	—	—	—
2007–08	Brûleurs de Loups	Ligue Magnus	16	5	5	10	30	6	1	1	2	33
2008–09	Färjestad BK	Elitserien	25	0	1	1	6	1	0	0	0	0
2008–09	Nybro Vikings	HockeyAllsvenskan	3	1	1	2	0	—	—	—	—	—
2008–09	Malmö Redhawks	HockeyAllsvenskan	5	1	0	1	6	—	—	—	—	—
2008–09	Bofors IK	HockeyAllsvenskan	6	1	1	2	16	—	—	—	—	—
2009–10	Malmö Redhawks	HockeyAllsvenskan	40	3	3	6	18	5	0	1	1	0
2010–11	HC Kladno	Czech Extraliga	39	9	6	15	86	—	—	—	—	—
2010–11	HC Sparta Praha	Czech Extraliga	6	1	0	1	4	7	4	2	6	2
2011–12	HC Sparta Praha	Czech Extraliga	10	3	1	4	18	5	1	1	2	14
2011–12	HC Slovan Ústečtí Lvi	Czech 1. Liga	11	0	2	2	33	11	7	5	12	14
2011–12	HC Berounští Medvědi	Czech 1. Liga	3	1	2	3	12	—	—	—	—	—
2012–13	HC Sparta Praha	Czech Extraliga	28	4	5	9	18	7	1	0	1	4
2012–13	HC Stadion Litoměřice	Czech 1. Liga	3	2	2	4	4	—	—	—	—	—
2013–14	Rytíři Kladno	Czech Extraliga	26	12	4	16	42	—	—	—	—	—
2014–15	Straubing Tigers	DEL	49	14	9	23	66	—	—	—	—	—
2015–16	Dragons de Rouen	Ligue Magnus	22	13	9	22	34	15	6	4	10	48
2016–17	Dragons de Rouen	Ligue Magnus	44	24	14	38	104	19	9	8	17	18
2017–18	HC Dynamo Pardubice	Czech Extraliga	48	14	8	22	58	7	4	0	4	8
2018–19	HC Dynamo Pardubice	Czech Extraliga	25	4	4	8	18	—	—	—	—	—
2018–19	Brûleurs de Loups	Ligue Magnus	3	2	3	5	12	15	7	6	13	16
2019–20	Brûleurs de Loups	Ligue Magnus	39	18	14	32	72	4	2	4	6	4
2020–21	Brûleurs de Loups	Ligue Magnus	22	10	13	23	58	—	—	—	—	—
2021–22	Brûleurs de Loups	Ligue Magnus	37	23	13	36	53	14	8	9	17	16
2022–23	Brûleurs de Loups	Ligue Magnus	39	21	26	47	91	15	6	6	12	14
2023–24	Brûleurs de Loups	Ligue Magnus	40	15	18	33	19	9	2	4	6	8
2024–25	Brûleurs de Loups	Ligue Magnus	31	11	22	33	10	14	5	6	11	35
2025–26	Brûleurs de Loups	Ligue Magnus	38	22	14	36	20	17	8	3	11	10
Ligue Magnus totals			373	172	156	328	541	143	56	51	107	226
Czech Extraliga totals			182	47	28	75	244	26	10	3	13	28

=== International ===
Year	Team	Event	GP	G	A	Pts	PIM
2005	France U18	WJC-18 (D1)	5	3	0	3	10
2006	France U20	WJC-20 (D1)	5	2	0	2	10
2007	France U20	WJC-20 (D1)	5	3	1	4	18
2007	France	WC (D1)	5	2	2	4	8
2008	France	WC	5	0	1	1	4
2009	France	WC	6	1	0	1	2
2010	France	WC	6	1	1	2	4
2011	France	WC	6	2	2	4	16
2012	France	WC	2	1	1	2	27
2013	France	OGQ	3	1	1	2	12
2013	France	WC	7	0	2	2	4
2015	France	WC	7	1	0	1	27
2016	France	WC	7	3	1	4	2
2016	France	OGQ	3	1	0	1	0
2017	France	WC	7	1	0	1	2
2018	France	WC	7	2	0	2	4
2019	France	WC	7	1	0	1	0
2021	France	OGQ	3	3	0	3	2
2022	France	WC	7	1	0	1	2
2023	France	WC	5	1	0	1	0
2024	France	WC	7	2	1	3	6
2024	France	OGQ	3	1	0	1	2
2025	France	WC	7	0	1	1	2
2026	France	OG	4	1	0	1	0
Junior totals			15	8	1	9	38
Senior totals			114	26	13	39	126
