= 2019–20 Ligue Magnus season =

2019–20 Ligue Magnus
- League: Ligue Magnus
- Sport: Ice hockey
- Duration: 10 September 2019 – 11 March 2020
- Teams: 11

Regular season
- Best record: Dragons de Rouen
- Runners-up: Ducs d'Angers
- Relegated to Division 1: none

Playoffs
- Finals champions: cancelled

Ligue Magnus seasons
- ← 2018–19 2020–21 →

The 2019–20 Ligue Magnus season was the 99th season of the Ligue Magnus, the top level of ice hockey in France. The regular season ran from 10 September 2019 to 21 February 2020. The Dragons de Rouen finished atop the standings. The postseason began on 23 February but was suspended and later cancelled on 12 March 2020 due to the COVID-19 pandemic. Due to the league operating with only 11-teams this season (below the desired 12-team format), no relegation would take place.

== Membership changes ==
- Étoile Noire de Strasbourg was relegated to Division 1 and replaced by Diables Rouges de Briançon.
- After the previous season, LHC Les Lions declared bankruptcy and were removed from the league. Because no Division 1 team was able to sign a license with the league on short notice, Ligue Magnus played as an eleven-team circuit for this season.

== Teams ==
2019–20 Ligue Magnus team map

Team	City	Arena	Coach
Gothiques d'Amiens	Amiens	Coliséum	(Canada) Mario Richer
Ducs d'Angers	Angers	IceParc	(Canada) Brennan Sonne
Anglet Hormadi	Anglet	Patinoire de la Barre	(Finland) Heikki Leime
Boxers de Bordeaux	Bordeaux	Patinoire de Mériadeck	(France) Olivier Dimet
Diables Rouges de Briançon	Briançon	Patinoire René Froger	(Canada) Claude Devèze (Canada) Eric Medeiros
Pionniers de Chamonix Mont-Blanc	Chamonix	Centre Sportif Richard Bozon	(Finland) Timo Saarikoski
Rapaces de Gap	Gap	Alp'Arena	(France) Eric Blais
Brûleurs de Loups	Grenoble	Patinoire Pole Sud	(Slovenia) Edo Terglav
Scorpions de Mulhouse	Mulhouse	Patinoire de l'Illberg	(France) Yorick Treille
Aigles de Nice	Nice	Patinoire Jean Bouin	(Slovakia) Stanislav Sutor
Dragons de Rouen	Rouen	Centre sportif Guy-Boissière	(France) Fabrice Lhenry

== Regular season ==
=== Standings ===
Pos	Team	Pld	W	OTW	OTL	L	GF	GA	GD	Pts	Qualification
1	Brûleurs de Loups	40	24	8	2	6	199	108	+91	90	Qualification to Play-offs
2	Dragons de Rouen	40	24	6	2	8	152	89	+63	86	Qualification to Play-offs
3	Ducs d'Angers	40	24	4	2	10	155	96	+59	82	Qualification to Play-offs
4	Gothiques d'Amiens	40	23	2	6	9	130	109	+21	79	Qualification to Play-offs
5	Scorpions de Mulhouse	40	17	4	3	16	132	114	+18	62	Qualification to Play-offs
6	Boxers de Bordeaux	40	17	3	3	17	118	118	0	60	Qualification to Play-offs
7	Rapaces de Gap	40	13	4	4	19	103	124	−21	51	Qualification to Play-offs
8	Pionniers de Chamonix Mont-Blanc	40	12	4	5	19	128	153	−25	49	Qualification to Play-offs
9	Anglet Hormadi	40	13	2	3	22	93	148	−55	46	Qualification to Play Out
10	Aigles de Nice	40	10	3	9	18	108	130	−22	45	Qualification to Play Out
11	Diables Rouges de Briançon	40	2	1	2	35	73	202	−129	10	Qualification to Play Out

Updated to match(es) played on unknown. Source: Ligue Magnus
Rules for classification: 1) Points; 2) Head-to-head points.

=== Statistics ===
==== Scoring leaders ====
Player	Team	Pos	GP	G	A	Pts	PIM
(United States) Alex Aleardi	Brûleurs de Loups	C/RW	40	26	37	63	28
(Canada) Tommy Giroux	Gothiques d'Amiens	LW	40	21	40	61	4
(Canada) Danick Bouchard	Ducs d'Angers	LW/RW	39	30	26	56	26
(Canada) Joël Champagne	Brûleurs de Loups	C	39	21	34	55	50
(France) Damien Fleury	Brûleurs de Loups	LW/RW	38	24	29	53	94
(Canada) Philippe Halley	Gothiques d'Amiens	C	39	22	31	53	26
(United States) Denny Kearney	Brûleurs de Loups	LW/RW	37	20	32	52	60
(Canada) Kyle Hardy	Brûleurs de Loups	D	40	14	38	52	64
(Latvia) Rolands Vīgners	Scorpions de Mulhouse	LW/RW	37	16	33	49	14
(Canada) Nicolas Deschamps	Dragons de Rouen	C/W	40	12	33	45	10

==== Leading goaltenders ====
The following goaltenders led the league in goals against average, provided that they have played at least 1/3 of their team's minutes.

Player	Team	GP	TOI	W	L	GA	SO	SV%	GAA
(Slovenia) Matija Pintarič	Dragons de Rouen	39	2296	29	10	80	5	.924	2.09
(France) Florian Hardy	Ducs d'Angers	38	2236	26	12	88	5	.910	2.36
(France) Clément Fouquerel	Boxers de Bordeaux	30	1776	15	15	73	3	.927	2.47
(France) Henri-Corentin Buysse	Gothiques d'Amiens	37	2130	22	13	90	2	.917	2.54
(Czech Republic) Lukáš Horák	Brûleurs de Loups	35	2072	28	6	89	4	.915	2.58

== Playoffs ==
=== Championship ===
Note: After the completion of the quarterfinal round, the remainder of the postseason was cancelled.

Quarterfinals (best-of-7)
1	Brûleurs de Loups	4	3	7	5	-	-	-
8	Pionniers de Chamonix Mont-Blanc	3	1	0	4	-	-	-
2	Dragons de Rouen	2*	3	4	7	-	-	-
7	Rapaces de Gap	1	2	1	5	-	-	-
(Pairings are re-seeded after the first round)
3	Ducs d'Angers	2	2	4	3	-	-	-
6	Boxers de Bordeaux	0	1	3	1	-	-	-
4	Gothiques d'Amiens	3	1	3	2*	3	3	2
5	Scorpions de Mulhouse	4*	2*	2	1	0	4	4

Semifinals (best-of-7)
1	Brûleurs de Loups	-	-	-	-	-	-	-
5	Scorpions de Mulhouse	-	-	-	-	-	-	-
2	Dragons de Rouen	-	-	-	-	-	-	-
3	Ducs d'Angers	-	-	-	-	-	-	-

Note: * denotes overtime
Note: ** denotes overtime and shootout

=== Relegation ===
Home \ Away	ANH	BRI	NIC	ANH	BRI	NIC
Anglet Hormadi	—	6–1	4–3 ^{(OT)}	—	6–4	4–2
Diables Rouges de Briançon	1–6	—	4–7	4–6	—	1–9
Aigles de Nice	3–4 ^{(OT)}	7–4	—	2–4	9–1	—

Updated to match(es) played on Final. Source: Ligue Magnus
Legend: Blue = home team win; Yellow = draw; Red = away team win.

Pos	Team	Pld	W	OTW	OTL	L	GF	GA	GD	Pts	Qualification
1	Anglet Hormadi (Note: Teams retained their points from the regular season.)	4	3	1	0	0	20	10	+10	57	Saved
2	Aigles de Nice	4	2	0	1	1	21	13	+8	52	Saved
3	Diables Rouges de Briançon	4	0	0	0	4	10	28	−18	10	Saved

Updated to match(es) played on unknown. Source: Ligue Magnus
Rules for classification: 1) Points; 2) Head-to-head points.
