= 2015–16 Ligue Magnus season =

2015–16 Ligue Magnus
- League: Ligue Magnus
- Sport: Ice hockey
- Duration: 19 September 2015 – 2 April 2016
- Number of teams: 14

Regular season
- Best record: Rapaces de Gap
- Runners-up: Gamyo Épinal
- Relegated to Division 1: LHC Les Lions, Diables Rouges de Briançon

Playoffs
- Finals champions: Dragons de Rouen
- Runners-up: Ducs d'Angers

Ligue Magnus seasons
- ← 2014–15 2016–17 →

The 2015–16 Ligue Magnus season was the 95th season of the Ligue Magnus, the top level of ice hockey in France. The regular season ran from 19 September 2015 to 6 February 2016. The Rapaces de Gap finished atop the standings. The postseason ran from 19 February to 26 March 2016. The Dragons de Rouen defeated the Ducs d'Angers 4 games to 0 for the league championship. LHC Les Lions and Diables Rouges de Briançon were relegated to Division 1 at the end of the season.

== League restructured ==
In 2016, Ligue Magnus announced plans to reorganized the league as a 12-team circuit. As a result, the six teams that failed to make the postseason would play in a relegation round. The top three relegation finishers would remain in Ligue Magnus. The bottom two would automatically be demoted to Division 1. The fourth-place team would play an additional best-of-three series against the Division 1 champion with the winner joining Ligue Magnus and the loser joining Division 1.

== Membership changes ==
- The Drakkars de Caen were relegated to Division 1 and replaced by Boxers de Bordeaux.

== Teams ==
2015–16 Ligue Magnus team map

Team	City	Arena	Coach
Gothiques d'Amiens	Amiens	Coliséum	(France) Olivier Duclos (United States) Barry Smith
Ducs d'Angers	Angers	Angers IceParc	(Canada) Jean-François Jodoin
Boxers de Bordeaux	Bordeaux	Patinoire de Mériadeck	(Canada) Martin Lacroix
Brest Albatros Hockey	Brest	Rinkla Stadium	(France) Sébastien Oprandi
Diables Rouges de Briançon	Briançon	Patinoire René Froger	(France) Alexis Billard (Sweden) Patric Wener
Pionniers de Chamonix Mont-Blanc	Chamonix	Centre Sportif Richard Bozon	(Finland) Stéphane Gros
Ducs de Dijon	Dijon	Patinoire Trimolet	(France) Jonathan Paredes
Gamyo Épinal	Épinal	Patinoire de Poissompré	(Finland) Stéphane Barin
Rapaces de Gap	Gap	Patinoire Brown-Ferrand	(Canada) Luciano Basile
Brûleurs de Loups	Grenoble	Patinoire Pole Sud	(Slovenia) Edo Terglav
LHC Les Lions	Lyon	Patinoire Charlemagne	(France) François Dusseau (Slovakia) Mitja Šivic
Pingouins de Morzine-Avoriaz	Morzine	Škoda Arena	(Czech Republic) Miroslav Fryčer (Netherlands) Tommie Hartogs
Dragons de Rouen	Rouen	Centre sportif Guy-Boissière	(France) Fabrice Lhenry
Étoile Noire de Strasbourg	Strasbourg	Patinoire Iceberg	(Canada) Daniel Bourdages

== Regular season ==
=== Standings ===
Pos	Team	Pld	W	OTW	OTL	L	GF	GA	GD	Pts	Qualification
1	Rapaces de Gap	26	17	3	1	5	106	76	+30	58	Qualification to Play-offs
2	Gamyo Épinal (Note: Épinal were deprived of 3 points by a decision of the Federation.)	26	16	5	1	4	100	64	+36	56	Qualification to Play-offs
3	Ducs d'Angers	26	18	0	1	7	110	84	+26	55	Qualification to Play-offs
4	Brûleurs de Loups	26	16	1	3	6	110	75	+35	53	Qualification to Play-offs
5	Dragons de Rouen	26	16	1	1	8	114	73	+41	51	Qualification to Play-offs
6	Brest Albatros Hockey	26	12	4	0	10	72	82	−10	44	Qualification to Play-offs
7	Gothiques d'Amiens	26	12	1	2	11	89	87	+2	40	Qualification to Play-offs
8	Étoile Noire de Strasbourg	26	10	3	2	11	80	92	−12	38	Qualification to Play-offs
9	Boxers de Bordeaux	26	9	3	2	12	87	89	−2	35	Qualification to Play Out
10	Pionniers de Chamonix Mont-Blanc	26	8	0	3	15	71	84	−13	27	Qualification to Play Out
11	Diables Rouges de Briançon	26	6	2	2	16	76	101	−25	24	Qualification to Play Out
12	LHC Les Lions	26	6	1	3	16	67	107	−40	23	Qualification to Play Out
13	Pingouins de Morzine-Avoriaz	26	5	1	3	17	69	107	−38	20	Qualification to Play Out
14	Ducs de Dijon	26	4	2	3	17	73	103	−30	19	Qualification to Play Out

Updated to match(es) played on unknown. Source: Ligue Magnus
Rules for classification: 1) Points; 2) Head-to-head points.

=== Statistics ===
==== Scoring leaders ====
Player	Team	Pos	GP	G	A	Pts	PIM
(Canada) Maxime Lacroix	Ducs d'Angers	C	26	22	25	47	14
(Canada) Éric Chouinard	Brûleurs de Loups	C/W	26	23	20	43	8
(Canada) Joël Champagne	Gothiques d'Amiens	C	26	16	26	42	38
(Slovenia) Ken Ograjenšek	Gamyo Épinal	RW	26	16	19	35	18
(Canada) Marc-André Thinel	Dragons de Rouen	LW/RW	26	14	20	34	22
(Canada) Jason Krog	Dragons de Rouen	C	26	10	24	34	6
(Canada) Francis Charland	Boxers de Bordeaux	RW	26	14	19	33	2
(Canada) Yanick Riendeau	Ducs de Dijon	C/RW	24	19	13	32	30
(Canada) Julien Desrosiers	Boxers de Bordeaux	C/LW	25	12	20	32	12
(Canada) Sébastien Trudeau	Étoile Noire de Strasbourg	RW	26	12	20	32	10
(Canada) Yannick Riendeau	Ducs d'Angers	LW/RW	19	7	25	32	12

==== Leading goaltenders ====
The following goaltenders led the league in goals against average, provided that they have played at least 1/3 of their team's minutes.

Player	Team	GP	TOI	W	L	GA	SO	SV%	GAA
(Slovenia) Andrej Hočevar	Gamyo Épinal	23	1374	19	4	52	2	.925	2.27
(Latvia) Ervīns Muštukovs	Brûleurs de Loups	17	1044	10	7	43	1	.923	2.47
(Canada) Raphaël Girard	Ducs d'Angers	12	693	10	2	30	0	.910	2.60
(Canada) Evan Mosher	Rapaces de Gap	20	1176	15	5	53	1	.902	2.71
(Canada) Dany Sabourin	Dragons de Rouen	24	1443	15	9	66	2	.892	2.75

== Playoffs ==
=== Championship ===
Quarterfinals (best-of-7)
1	Rapaces de Gap	9	4	5	2	2	-	-
8	Étoile Noire de Strasbourg	2	1	3	3	1	-	-
2	Gamyo Épinal	4	7	4	1	4	-	-
7	Gothiques d'Amiens	2	2	2	2*	3	-	-
(Pairings are re-seeded after the first round)
3	Ducs d'Angers	6	5	2	2	3*	-	-
6	Brest Albatros Hockey	2	2	4	0	2	-	-
4	Brûleurs de Loups	2	3	1	1	1	-	-
5	Dragons de Rouen	4	4	3	0	2*	-	-

Semifinals (best-of-7)
1	Rapaces de Gap	4	5	2	0	1	6	-
5	Dragons de Rouen	5	2	0	4	3	7*	-
2	Gamyo Épinal	1	7	3	0	6	3	4
3	Ducs d'Angers	4	1	1	4	2	4**	5**

Championship (best-of-7)
5	Dragons de Rouen	3**	4	6	9	-	-	-
3	Ducs d'Angers	2	2	2	1	-	-	-

Note: * denotes overtime
Note: ** denotes overtime and shootout

=== Relegation ===
Home \ Away	BOR	BRI	CHA	DIJ	LYO	MOR	BOR	BRI	CHA	DIJ	LYO	MOR
Boxers de Bordeaux	—	3–2 ^{(SO)}	3–2	3–1	3–0	3–6	—	1–2	6–1	4–3 ^{(OT)}	2–1 ^{(OT)}	0–1
Diables Rouges de Briançon	2–3 ^{(SO)}	—	1–4	1–4	5–4 ^{(OT)}	5–2	2–1	—	4–5	1–3	4–6	0–4
Pionniers de Chamonix Mont-Blanc	2–3	4–1	—	1–4	6–4	6–5 ^{(OT)}	1–6	5–4	—	1–2 ^{(SO)}	3–2 ^{(OT)}	2–1 ^{(OT)}
Ducs de Dijon	1–3	4–1	4–1	—	3–5	7–3	3–4 ^{(OT)}	3–1	2–1 ^{(SO)}	—	7–4	2–1
LHC Les Lions	0–3	4–5 ^{(OT)}	4–6	5–3	—	4–3 ^{(OT)}	1–2 ^{(OT)}	6–4	2–3 ^{(OT)}	4–7	—	2–3
Pingouins de Morzine-Avoriaz	6–3	2–5	5–6 ^{(OT)}	3–7	3–4 ^{(OT)}	—	1–0	4–0	1–2 ^{(OT)}	1–2	3–2	—

Updated to match(es) played on Final. Source: Ligue Magnus
Legend: Blue = home team win; Yellow = draw; Red = away team win.

Pos	Team	Pld	W	OTW	OTL	L	GF	GA	GD	Pts	Qualification
1	Boxers de Bordeaux (Note: Teams retained their points in common games from the regular season.)	10	4	3	0	3	28	19	+9	40	Saved
2	Pionniers de Chamonix Mont-Blanc	10	3	3	1	3	31	32	−1	35	Saved
3	Ducs de Dijon	10	6	1	1	2	36	24	+12	30	Saved
4	Pingouins de Morzine-Avoriaz	10	4	0	3	3	29	31	−2	28	Play-out
5	LHC Les Lions	10	2	1	3	4	32	39	−7	27	Relegated
6	Diables Rouges de Briançon	10	2	1	1	6	25	36	−11	20	Relegated

Updated to match(es) played on unknown. Source: Ligue Magnus
Rules for classification: 1) Points; 2) Head-to-head points.

=== Play-out ===
29 March to 2 April 2016

Championship (best-of-3)
1	Pingouins de Morzine-Avoriaz	4	5	-
2	Aigles de Nice	2	4	-
