= Yorick Treille =

French ice hockey player

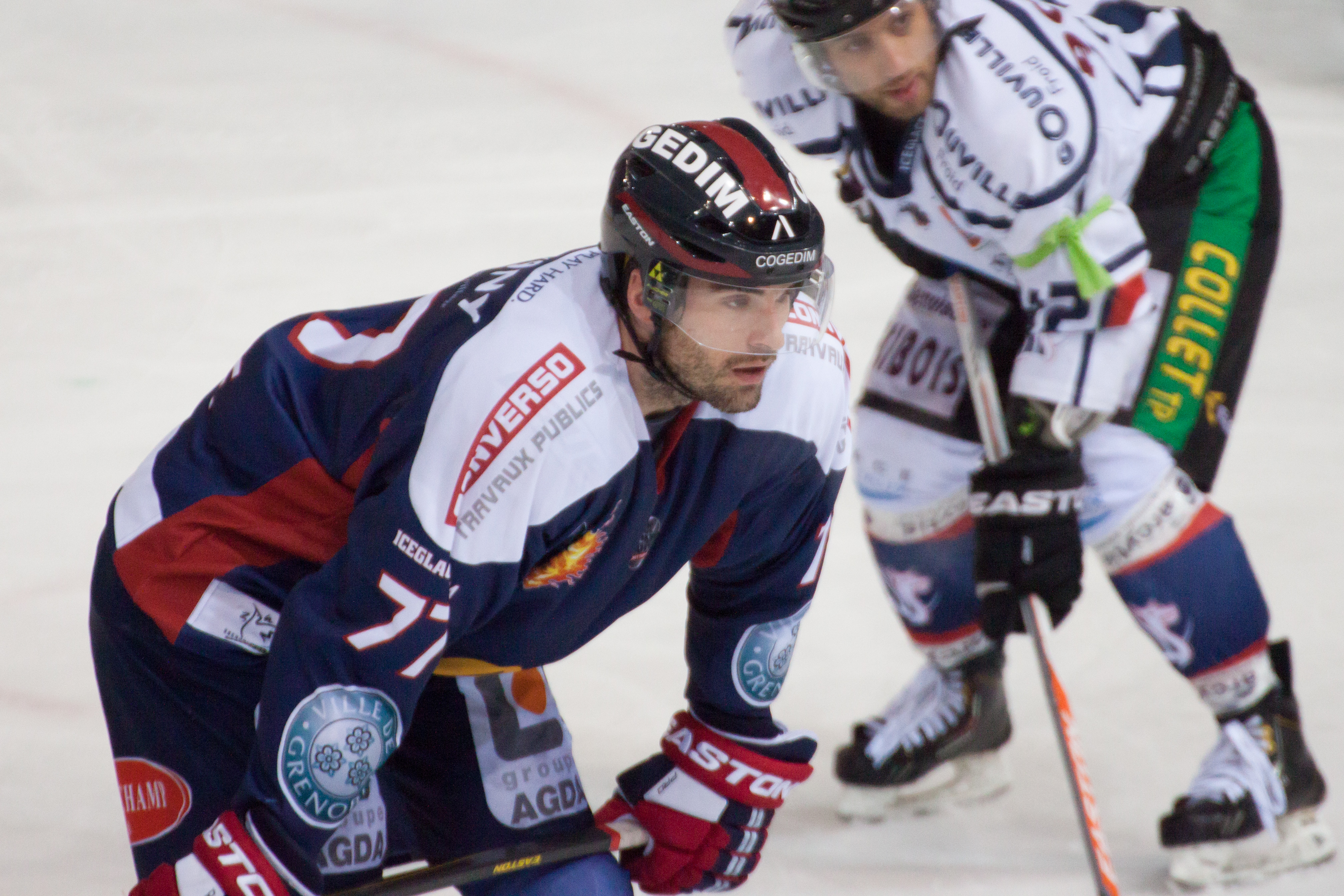
- Treille in 2013
- Born: 15 July 1980 (age 45) Cannes, France
- Height: 6 ft 3 in (191 cm)
- Weight: 196 lb (89 kg; 14 st 0 lb)
- Position: Right wing
- Shot: Right
- Played for: HC Vítkovice; ERC Ingolstadt; Genève-Servette HC; Providence Bruins; Norfolk Admirals; HIFK; HC Sparta Prague; Piráti Chomutov; EC Salzburg; Brûleurs de Loups; Dragons de Rouen; Scorpions de Mulhouse
- National team: France
- NHL draft: 195th overall, 1999; Chicago Blackhawks
- Playing career: 2002–2018

Yorick Treille (born 15 July 1980) is a French former professional ice hockey forward. Treille was drafted by the Chicago Blackhawks of the National Hockey League (NHL) in 1999, but never played in the NHL. He went to university at the University of Massachusetts Lowell and has played for the Providence Bruins and Norfolk Admirals of the American Hockey League, as well as teams in Finland, Switzerland, and Germany. Treille has played for the French national team in multiple World Championships, as well as the 2002 Winter Olympics. His brother, Sacha Treille, is also an ice hockey player, and has played for the French national team.

== Career statistics ==
=== Regular season and playoffs ===
			Regular season					Playoffs
Season	Team	League	GP	G	A	Pts	PIM	GP	G	A	Pts	PIM
1995–96	Medicine Hat Hounds AAA	AMBHL	34	22	23	45	44	—	—	—	—	—
1997–98	Notre Dame Hounds	SJHL	54	18	28	46	42	—	—	—	—	—
1998–99	University of Massachusetts Lowell	HE	30	6	5	11	24	—	—	—	—	—
1999–2000	University of Massachusetts Lowell	HE	33	10	12	22	34	—	—	—	—	—
2000–01	University of Massachusetts Lowell	HE	31	10	14	24	35	—	—	—	—	—
2001–02	University of Massachusetts Lowell	HE	30	10	16	26	24	—	—	—	—	—
2002–03	Norfolk Admirals	AHL	27	3	2	5	25	—	—	—	—	—
2002–03	HIFK	SM-l	5	0	1	1	4	—	—	—	—	—
2003–04	Norfolk Admirals	AHL	74	12	12	24	54	8	2	0	2	4
2004–05	Providence Bruins	AHL	61	5	9	14	35	—	—	—	—	—
2005–06	Genève–Servette HC	NLA	23	6	7	13	34	—	—	—	—	—
2006–07	Genève–Servette HC	NLA	43	15	17	32	66	5	2	1	3	10
2007–08	ERC Ingolstadt	DEL	29	2	14	16	52	—	—	—	—	—
2008–09	HC Vítkovice Steel	CZE	33	4	3	7	56	3	0	0	0	0
2009–10	HC Vítkovice Steel	CZE	50	5	11	16	46	15	4	3	7	8
2010–11	HC Sparta Praha	CZE	29	11	7	18	32	—	—	—	—	—
2011–12	HC Sparta Praha	CZE	52	7	11	18	32	5	0	0	0	4
2012–13	HC Sparta Praha	CZE	5	0	1	1	4	—	—	—	—	—
2012–13	Piráti Chomutov	CZE	24	4	1	5	20	—	—	—	—	—
2012–13	EC Salzburg	AUT	3	2	1	3	4	12	2	1	3	10
2013–14	Brûleurs de Loups	FRA	26	11	11	22	48	5	0	2	2	4
2014–15	Brûleurs de Loups	FRA	18	7	6	13	12	5	1	1	2	37
2015–16	Dragons de Rouen	FRA	26	8	21	29	14	15	4	5	9	10
2016–17	Dragons de Rouen	FRA	43	4	16	20	28	19	2	3	5	10
2017–18	Scorpions de Mulhouse	FRA	41	16	16	32	22	6	2	2	4	14
2018–19	Scorpions de Mulhouse	FRA	15	5	7	12	12	—	—	—	—	—
AHL totals			162	20	23	43	114	8	2	0	2	4
CZE totals			193	31	34	65	190	23	4	3	7	12
FRA totals			169	51	77	128	136	50	9	13	22	75

=== International ===
Year	Team	Event	GP	G	A	Pts	PIM
1997	France	EJC B	6	5	3	8	32
1998	France	WJC B	6	2	3	5	12
1998	France	EJC B	5	5	5	10	12
1999	France	WJC B	5	4	7	11	10
2000	France	WC	6	0	1	1	0
2001	France	WC D1	5	2	2	4	33
2002	France	OG	4	0	0	0	4
2002	France	WC D1	5	2	1	3	6
2003	France	WC D1	5	3	2	5	55
2007	France	WC D1	5	2	2	4	8
2008	France	WC	5	3	1	4	12
2009	France	WC	6	1	1	2	8
2010	France	WC	6	2	0	2	2
2012	France	WC	7	1	1	2	6
2013	France	OGQ	3	0	1	1	0
2013	France	WC	7	1	2	3	4
2014	France	WC	8	1	2	3	20
2015	France	WC	7	1	1	2	2
2016	France	WC	6	0	1	1	0
2016	France	OGQ	3	1	1	2	2
Junior totals			22	16	18	34	66
Senior totals			88	20	19	39	162
