= 2020–21 Ligue Magnus season =

2020–21 Ligue Magnus
- League: Ligue Magnus
- Sport: Ice hockey
- Duration: 26 September 2020 – 2 April 2021
- Teams: 12

Regular season
- Best record: Dragons de Rouen
- Runners-up: Ducs d'Angers
- Relegated to Division 1: none

Ligue Magnus seasons
- ← 2019–20 2021–22 →

The 2020–21 Ligue Magnus season was the 100th season of the Ligue Magnus, the top level of ice hockey in France. The regular season ran from 26 September 2020 to 2 April 2021. The Dragons de Rouen finished atop the standings. Due to the ongoing COVID-19 pandemic, no postseason was held and relegation was cancelled.

== COVID ==
Due to quarantine and other government policies regarding positive COVID tests, the league had an unbalanced schedule for the season. While all teams played one another at least twice, Nice played an additional four games, each against a different opponent. In order to not give those teams an advantage for playing more game than their contemporaries, they had their points totals adjusted down in the following way: the points gained in the confrontations which took place three times instead of two are reduced to two thirds of their value and rounded down to the nearest whole number. This resulted in Bordeaux, Briançon and Gap losing 2 points in the standings and Nice losing 6.

== Member changes ==
- While no relegation or promotion was scheduled to happen for this season, Ligue Magnus had an open position due to the bankruptcy of the LHC Les Lions just prior to the previous season. With no Division 1 league champion, Jokers de Cergy-Pontoise, the regular season champions, were promoted to the top division for this season.

== Teams ==
2020–21 Ligue Magnus team map

Team	City	Arena	Coach
Gothiques d'Amiens	Amiens	Coliséum	(France) Anthony Mortas
Ducs d'Angers	Angers	IceParc	(Canada) Brennan Sonne
Anglet Hormadi	Anglet	Patinoire de la Barre	(Czech Republic) David Dostal
Boxers de Bordeaux	Bordeaux	Patinoire de Mériadeck	(France) Olivier Dimet
Diables Rouges de Briançon	Briançon	Patinoire René Froger	(Canada) Eric Medeiros
Jokers de Cergy-Pontoise	Cergy-Pontoise	Aren'Ice	(France) Jonathan Paredes
Pionniers de Chamonix Mont-Blanc	Chamonix	Centre Sportif Richard Bozon	(Finland) Timo Saarikoski
Rapaces de Gap	Gap	Alp'Arena	(France) Eric Blais
Brûleurs de Loups	Grenoble	Patinoire Pole Sud	(Slovenia) Edo Terglav
Scorpions de Mulhouse	Mulhouse	Patinoire de l'Illberg	(Canada) Alexandre Gagnon
Aigles de Nice	Nice	Patinoire Jean Bouin	(Slovakia) Stanislav Sutor
Dragons de Rouen	Rouen	Centre sportif Guy-Boissière	(France) Fabrice Lhenry

== Regular season ==
=== Standings ===
Pos	Team	Pld	W	OTW	OTL	L	GF	GA	GD	Pts	Qualification
1	Dragons de Rouen	22	17	1	2	2	101	39	+62	55	Won league championship
2	Ducs d'Angers	22	15	2	1	4	88	47	+41	50	No postseason held
3	Brûleurs de Loups	22	14	0	1	7	92	67	+25	43	No postseason held
4	Rapaces de Gap (Note: Rapaces de Gap were deprived of 2 points by a decision of the Federation.)	23	9	5	2	7	76	59	+17	37	No postseason held
5	Jokers de Cergy-Pontoise	22	11	1	1	9	71	82	−11	36	No postseason held
6	Gothiques d'Amiens	22	10	1	0	11	68	60	+8	32	No postseason held
7	Boxers de Bordeaux (Note: Boxers de Bordeaux were deprived of 2 points by a decision of the Federation.)	23	9	3	1	10	75	74	+1	32	No postseason held
8	Scorpions de Mulhouse	22	9	0	2	11	60	71	−11	29	No postseason held
9	Aigles de Nice (Note: Aigles de Nice were deprived of 6 points by a decision of the Federation.)	26	10	1	1	14	64	83	−19	27	No postseason held
10	Anglet Hormadi	23	6	1	2	14	71	97	−26	22	No postseason held
11	Pionniers de Chamonix Mont-Blanc	22	7	0	0	15	60	88	−28	21	No postseason held
12	Diables Rouges de Briançon (Note: Diables Rouges de Briançon were deprived of 2 points by a decision of the Federation.)	23	3	1	3	16	46	105	−59	12	No postseason held

Updated to match(es) played on unknown. Source: Ligue Magnus
Rules for classification: 1) Points; 2) Head-to-head points.

=== Statistics ===
==== Scoring leaders ====
Player	Team	Pos	GP	G	A	Pts	PIM
(Canada) Nicolas Deschamps	Dragons de Rouen	C/W	22	10	19	29	8
(France) Damien Fleury	Brûleurs de Loups	LW/RW	22	13	15	28	14
(France) Anthony Guttig	Dragons de Rouen	C/LW	22	5	22	27	6
(Canada) Philippe Halley	Ducs d'Angers	C	22	11	14	25	18
(Russia) Andrei Rychagov	Pionniers de Chamonix Mont-Blanc	C	22	7	17	24	26
(Canada) Joël Champagne	Brûleurs de Loups	C	22	6	18	24	20
(Canada) Simon Bourque	Boxers de Bordeaux	D	22	4	20	24	38
(Latvia) Rolands Vīgners	Dragons de Rouen	LW/RW	21	14	9	23	4
(France) Sacha Treille	Brûleurs de Loups	LW/RW	22	10	13	23	58
(Sweden) Johan Skinnars	Boxers de Bordeaux	C/W	23	7	16	23	2

==== Leading goaltenders ====
The following goaltenders led the league in goals against average, provided that they have played at least 1/3 of their team's minutes.

Player	Team	GP	TOI	W	L	GA	SO	SV%	GAA
(Slovenia) Matija Pintarič	Dragons de Rouen	21	1209	17	6	35	3	.938	1.74
(France) Florian Hardy	Ducs d'Angers	20	1170	14	6	40	2	.913	2.05
(France) Julian Junca	Rapaces de Gap	20	1162	12	8	42	1	.923	2.17
(France) Henri-Corentin Buysse	Gothiques d'Amiens	13	762	6	6	29	1	.931	2.29
(Czech Republic) Lukáš Horák	Brûleurs de Loups	19	1101	11	7	49	1	.911	2.67
(France) Sebastian Ylönen	Jokers de Cergy-Pontoise	11	653	7	4	29	1	.916	2.67
