= 2016–17 Ligue Magnus season =

2016–17 Ligue Magnus
- League: Ligue Magnus
- Sport: Ice hockey
- Duration: 13 September 2016 – 7 April 2017
- Teams: 12

Regular season
- Best record: Rapaces de Gap
- Runners-up: Brûleurs de Loups
- Top scorer: Samuel Takáč (LHC Les Lions)
- Relegated to Division 1: Pionniers de Chamonix-Morzine

Playoffs
- Finals champions: Rapaces de Gap
- Runners-up: Dragons de Rouen

Ligue Magnus seasons
- ← 2015–16 2017–18 →

The 2016–17 Ligue Magnus season was the 96th season of the Ligue Magnus, the top level of ice hockey in France. The regular season ran from 13 September 2016 to 24 February 2017. The Rapaces de Gap finished atop the standings. The postseason ran from 28 February to 7 April 2017. The Rapaces de Gap defeated the Dragons de Rouen 4 games to 2 for the league championship. Pionniers de Chamonix-Morzine was relegated to Division 1 at the end of the season.

== League restructured ==
In 2016, Ligue Magnus reorganized the league as a 12-team circuit, dropping 2 teams from the league. Concurrently, the league then expanded the schedule to double the number of matches between teams from two per season to four. This caused each member team's slate of games to go from 26 to 44.

== Membership changes ==
Due to the restructure, both Diables Rouges de Briançon and LHC Les Lions were set to be demoted to Division 1. However, Morzine-Avoriaz came to an agreement with Pionniers de Chamonix Mont-Blanc to merge the two teams and form a new club called Pionniers de Chamonix-Morzine. The new unified club would play home games in both Chamonix and Morzine during the season.

In June, Brest Albatros Hockey announced that, due to financial difficulty, they would withdraw from the league and join Division 1. Because they violated the terms of their license, the club was fined €10,000 and barred from postseason play for the 2016–17 season. As a result, LHC Les Lions was allowed to remain in the league while Briançon was relegated in favor of Division 1 champion, Aigles de Nice.

== Teams ==
2016–17 Ligue Magnus team map

Team	City	Arena	Coach
Gothiques d'Amiens	Amiens	Coliséum	(Canada) Mario Richer
Ducs d'Angers	Angers	Angers IceParc	(Canada) Jean-François Jodoin
Boxers de Bordeaux	Bordeaux	Patinoire de Mériadeck	(France) Philippe Bozon
Pionniers de Chamonix-Morzine	Chamonix, Morzine	Centre Sportif Richard Bozon, Škoda Arena	(Finland) Stéphane Gros, (Finland) Christophe Ville
Ducs de Dijon	Dijon	Patinoire Trimolet	(France) Jonathan Paredes
Gamyo Épinal	Épinal	Patinoire de Poissompré	(Finland) Stéphane Barin (Canada) Brad Gratton
Rapaces de Gap	Gap	Patinoire Brown-Ferrand	(Canada) Luciano Basile
Brûleurs de Loups	Grenoble	Patinoire Pole Sud	(Slovenia) Edo Terglav
LHC Les Lions	Lyon	Patinoire Charlemagne	(Slovakia) Mitja Šivic
Aigles de Nice	Nice	Patinoire Jean Bouin	(Slovakia) Stanislav Sutor
Dragons de Rouen	Rouen	Centre sportif Guy-Boissière	(France) Fabrice Lhenry
Étoile Noire de Strasbourg	Strasbourg	Patinoire Iceberg	(Canada) Daniel Bourdages

== Regular season ==
=== Standings ===
Pos	Team	Pld	W	OTW	OTL	L	GF	GA	GD	Pts	Qualification
1	Rapaces de Gap	43	28	4	2	9	177	95	+82	94	Qualification to Play-offs
2	Brûleurs de Loups (Note: Brûleurs de Loups were deprived of 6 points by a decision of the Federation.)	44	25	9	3	7	157	104	+53	90	Qualification to Play-offs
3	Dragons de Rouen	43	26	5	0	12	159	108	+51	88	Qualification to Play-offs
4	Boxers de Bordeaux	44	25	4	3	12	145	101	+44	86	Qualification to Play-offs
5	LHC Les Lions	44	22	5	6	11	139	104	+35	82	Qualification to Play-offs
6	Ducs d'Angers	44	14	5	9	16	109	119	−10	61	Qualification to Play-offs
7	Gothiques d'Amiens	44	14	3	5	22	114	140	−26	53	Qualification to Play-offs
8	Gamyo Épinal	44	13	4	4	23	116	147	−31	51	Qualification to Play-offs
9	Étoile Noire de Strasbourg	44	12	3	5	24	109	146	−37	47	Qualification to Play Out
10	Ducs de Dijon	44	12	2	4	26	99	154	−55	44	Qualification to Play Out
11	Aigles de Nice	44	10	5	4	25	109	147	−38	44	Qualification to Play Out
12	Pionniers de Chamonix-Morzine	44	10	3	7	24	109	177	−68	43	Qualification to Play Out

Updated to match(es) played on unknown. Source: Ligue Magnus
Rules for classification: 1) Points; 2) Head-to-head points.

=== Statistics ===
==== Scoring leaders ====
Player	Team	Pos	GP	G	A	Pts	PIM
(Slovakia) Samuel Takáč	LHC Les Lions	LW	43	24	37	61	36
(Canada) Scott Fleming	LHC Les Lions	LW	43	26	32	58	42
(Canada) Éric Chouinard	Brûleurs de Loups	C/W	44	23	34	57	30
(Canada) David Gilbert	Boxers de Bordeaux	C/LW	42	30	24	54	59
(Canada) Yanick Riendeau	Gothiques d'Amiens	C/RW	44	20	30	50	42
(Canada) Joël Champagne	Gothiques d'Amiens	C	43	21	27	48	62
(Latvia) Artūrs Mickēvičs	LHC Les Lions	LW/RW	44	19	28	47	28
(Canada) François-Pierre Guénette	Dragons de Rouen	C	44	17	29	46	39
(Canada) Marc-André Thinel	Dragons de Rouen	LW/RW	44	21	22	43	14
(Canada) Marc-André Bernier	Rapaces de Gap	RW	41	19	24	43	20
(France) Anthony Rech	Rapaces de Gap	LW/RW	30	15	28	43	24
(Canada) Félix Petit	Boxers de Bordeaux	C	41	12	31	43	10

==== Leading goaltenders ====
The following goaltenders led the league in goals against average, provided that they have played at least 1/3 of their team's minutes.

Player	Team	GP	TOI	W	L	GA	SO	SV%	GAA
(France) Clément Fouquerel	Rapaces de Gap	37	2176	25	12	74	4	.912	2.04
(France) Sebastian Ylönen	Boxers de Bordeaux	39	2331	16	13	84	3	.921	2.16
(Czech Republic) Lukáš Horák	Brûleurs de Loups	30	1777	23	7	67	2	.922	2.26
(Slovenia) Matija Pintarič	LHC Les Lions	34	2019	20	13	76	3	.933	2.26
(Canada) Dany Sabourin	Dragons de Rouen	43	2396	30	11	92	3	.913	2.30

== Playoffs ==
=== Championship ===
Quarterfinals (best-of-7)
1	Rapaces de Gap	3	4	7	5	-	-	-
8	Gamyo Épinal	2	0	4	3	-	-	-
2	Brûleurs de Loups	4	5	6	2	3	-	-
7	Gothiques d'Amiens	5**	4	1	1	2	-	-
(Pairings are re-seeded after the first round)
3	Dragons de Rouen	6	4	2	6	6	5	-
6	Ducs d'Angers	5	5	4	3	4	1	-
4	Boxers de Bordeaux	0	2	4**	2	2	-	-
5	LHC Les Lions	2	1	3	0	1	-	-

Semifinals (best-of-7)
1	Rapaces de Gap	7	3	3	2	4	5	-
4	Boxers de Bordeaux	3	5	2	3	0	1	-
2	Brûleurs de Loups	2	4	2	3	4	2	0
3	Dragons de Rouen	3	3	7	0	3	3*	2

Championship (best-of-7)
1	Rapaces de Gap	2	5	1	3*	3	4	-
3	Dragons de Rouen	3*	3	5	2	2	2	-

Note: * denotes overtime
Note: ** denotes overtime and shootout

=== Relegation ===
Home \ Away	CHA	DIJ	NIC	STR	CHA	DIJ	NIC	STR
Pionniers de Chamonix-Morzine	—	7–2	1–5	1–3	—	6–7	4–2	1–5
Ducs de Dijon	2–7	—	4–3	0–3	7–6	—	4–1	3–5
Aigles de Nice	5–1	3–4	—	4–0	2–4	1–4	—	4–3
Étoile Noire de Strasbourg	3–1	3–0	0–4	—	5–1	5–3	3–4	—

Updated to match(es) played on Final. Source: Ligue Magnus
Legend: Blue = home team win; Yellow = draw; Red = away team win.

Pos	Team	Pld	W	OTW	OTL	L	GF	GA	GD	Pts	Qualification
1	Étoile Noire de Strasbourg (Note: Teams retained their points in common games from the regular season.)	6	4	0	0	2	19	13	+6	31	Saved
2	Ducs de Dijon	6	3	0	0	3	20	25	−5	30	Saved
3	Aigles de Nice	6	3	0	0	3	19	16	+3	28	Saved
4	Pionniers de Chamonix-Morzine	6	2	0	0	4	20	24	−4	19	Relegated

Updated to match(es) played on unknown. Source: Ligue Magnus
Rules for classification: 1) Points; 2) Head-to-head points.
