= 2018–19 Ligue Magnus season =

2018–19 Ligue Magnus
- League: Ligue Magnus
- Sport: Ice hockey
- Duration: 8 September 2018 – 9 April 2019
- Teams: 12

Regular season
- Best record: Dragons de Rouen
- Runners-up: Brûleurs de Loups
- Relegated to Division 1: Étoile Noire de Strasbourg

Playoffs
- Finals champions: Brûleurs de Loups
- Runners-up: Dragons de Rouen

Ligue Magnus seasons
- ← 2017–18 2019–20 →

The 2018–19 Ligue Magnus season was the 98th season of the Ligue Magnus, the top level of ice hockey in France. The regular season ran from 8 September 2018 to 26 February 2019. The Dragons de Rouen finished atop the standings. The postseason ran from 1 March to 9 April 2019. The Brûleurs de Loups defeated the Dragons de Rouen 4 games to 3 for the league championship. Étoile Noire de Strasbourg was relegated to Division 1 at the end of the season.

== Membership changes ==
- Étoile Noire de Strasbourg was scheduled to be relegated to Division 1. However, immediately after the season, Gamyo Épinal declared bankruptcy and were removed from the league. As a result, Strasbourg remained in the league while Anglet Hormadi replaced Gamyo Épinal.

== Teams ==
2018–19 Ligue Magnus team map

Team	City	Arena	Coach
Gothiques d'Amiens	Amiens	Coliséum	(Canada) Mario Richer
Ducs d'Angers	Angers	IceParc	(Canada) Brennan Sonne
Anglet Hormadi	Anglet	Patinoire de la Barre	(France) Olivier Dimet
Boxers de Bordeaux	Bordeaux	Patinoire de Mériadeck	(France) Philippe Bozon
Pionniers de Chamonix Mont-Blanc	Chamonix	Centre Sportif Richard Bozon	(Finland) Heikki Leime
Rapaces de Gap	Gap	Alp'Arena	(Canada) Luciano Basile
Brûleurs de Loups	Grenoble	Patinoire Pole Sud	(Slovenia) Edo Terglav
LHC Les Lions	Lyon	Patinoire Charlemagne	(Slovakia) Mitja Šivic
Scorpions de Mulhouse	Mulhouse	Patinoire de l'Illberg	(Sweden) Christer Eriksson
Aigles de Nice	Nice	Patinoire Jean Bouin	(Slovakia) Stanislav Sutor
Dragons de Rouen	Rouen	Centre sportif Guy-Boissière	(France) Fabrice Lhenry
Étoile Noire de Strasbourg	Strasbourg	Patinoire Iceberg	(Canada) Daniel Bourdages

== Regular season ==
=== Standings ===
Pos	Team	Pld	W	OTW	OTL	L	GF	GA	GD	Pts	Qualification
1	Dragons de Rouen	44	37	4	2	1	195	82	+113	121	Qualification to Play-offs
2	Brûleurs de Loups	44	32	5	0	7	195	91	+104	106	Qualification to Play-offs
3	Gothiques d'Amiens	44	21	5	3	15	130	105	+25	76	Qualification to Play-offs
4	Ducs d'Angers	44	21	4	4	15	141	138	+3	75	Qualification to Play-offs
5	Rapaces de Gap	44	19	2	4	19	132	134	−2	65	Qualification to Play-offs
6	Boxers de Bordeaux (Note: Boxers de Bordeaux were deprived of 9 points by a decision of the Federation.)	44	19	2	7	16	126	122	+4	59	Qualification to Play-offs
7	Aigles de Nice	44	15	4	1	24	148	150	−2	54	Qualification to Play-offs
8	Pionniers de Chamonix Mont-Blanc	44	14	2	5	23	135	158	−23	51	Qualification to Play-offs
9	LHC Les Lions	44	12	6	2	24	112	146	−34	50	Qualification to Play Out
10	Scorpions de Mulhouse	44	11	5	5	23	108	165	−57	48	Qualification to Play Out
11	Anglet Hormadi	44	12	2	6	24	116	165	−49	46	Qualification to Play Out
12	Étoile Noire de Strasbourg	44	7	3	5	29	108	190	−82	32	Qualification to Play Out

Updated to match(es) played on unknown. Source: Ligue Magnus
Rules for classification: 1) Points; 2) Head-to-head points.

=== Statistics ===
==== Scoring leaders ====
Player	Team	Pos	GP	G	A	Pts	PIM
(France) Guillaume Leclerc	Brûleurs de Loups	C	44	29	32	61	30
(United States) Denny Kearney	Brûleurs de Loups	LW/RW	44	21	39	60	74
(Canada) Joël Champagne	Dragons de Rouen	C	44	16	44	60	88
(United States) Alex Aleardi	Dragons de Rouen	C/RW	44	35	21	56	83
(Canada) Marc-André Thinel	Brûleurs de Loups	LW/RW	44	14	38	52	10
(Finland) Juuso Perttilä	Aigles de Nice	LW	37	25	24	49	18
(Finland) Tuukka Rajamäki	Aigles de Nice	C/LW	44	17	32	49	22
(France) Damien Fleury	Brûleurs de Loups	LW/RW	41	26	21	47	66
(Canada) Maxime Lacroix	Ducs d'Angers	LW/RW	44	24	20	44	40
(United States) Erik Higby	Pionniers de Chamonix Mont-Blanc	C	42	18	26	44	62
(France) Julien Correia	LHC Les Lions	F	44	18	26	44	32

==== Leading goaltenders ====
The following goaltenders led the league in goals against average, provided that they have played at least 1/3 of their team's minutes.

Player	Team	GP	TOI	W	L	GA	SO	SV%	GAA
(Slovenia) Matija Pintarič	Dragons de Rouen	40	2349	37	3	64	9	.945	1.64
(Czech Republic) Lukáš Horák	Brûleurs de Loups	34	1978	26	7	68	4	.925	2.06
(France) Henri-Corentin Buysse	Gothiques d'Amiens	41	2437	25	16	87	5	.925	2.14
(France) Florian Hardy	Ducs d'Angers	40	2258	24	14	96	4	.909	2.55
(France) Clément Fouquerel	Boxers de Bordeaux	38	2216	20	18	100	3	.903	2.71

== Playoffs ==
=== Championship ===
Quarterfinals (best-of-7)
1	Dragons de Rouen	12	9	3	4	-	-	-
8	Pionniers de Chamonix Mont-Blanc	2	0	2	0	-	-	-
2	Brûleurs de Loups	5	6	4	7	-	-	-
7	Aigles de Nice	1	1	3	0	-	-	-
(Pairings are re-seeded after the first round)
3	Gothiques d'Amiens	0	3*	1	4	3	4	7
6	Boxers de Bordeaux	1*	2	2	3	4	0	2
4	Ducs d'Angers	1	2	3	1	2	-	-
5	Rapaces de Gap	3	1	5	5	3	-	-

Semifinals (best-of-7)
1	Dragons de Rouen	2	3	5*	3	5	-	-
5	Rapaces de Gap	0	2	4	4	3	-	-
2	Brûleurs de Loups	7	3	7	4	-	-	-
3	Gothiques d'Amiens	1	2	3	2	-	-	-

Championship (best-of-7)
1	Dragons de Rouen	2	2	2	1	4**	1	1
2	Brûleurs de Loups	3	3	1	0	3	4	2

Note: * denotes overtime
Note: ** denotes overtime and shootout

=== Relegation ===
Home \ Away	ANH	LYO	MUL	STR	ANH	LYO	MUL	STR
Anglet Hormadi	—	7–6 ^{(OT)}	4–3	3–2	—	2–6	6–3	6–3
LHC Les Lions	6–7 ^{(OT)}	—	3–5	7–4	6–2	—	3–4	8–7 ^{(OT)}
Scorpions de Mulhouse	3–4	5–3	—	8–0	3–6	4–3	—	6–1
Étoile Noire de Strasbourg	2–3	4–7	0–8	—	3–6	7–8 ^{(OT)}	1–6	—

Updated to match(es) played on Final. Source: Ligue Magnus
Legend: Blue = home team win; Yellow = draw; Red = away team win.

Pos	Team	Pld	W	OTW	OTL	L	GF	GA	GD	Pts	Qualification
1	Anglet Hormadi	6	4	1	0	1	28	23	+5	60	Saved
2	Scorpions de Mulhouse	6	4	0	0	2	29	17	+12	60	Saved
3	LHC Les Lions (Note: Teams retained their points from the regular season.)	6	2	1	1	2	33	29	+4	59	Saved
4	Étoile Noire de Strasbourg	6	0	0	1	5	17	38	−21	33	Relegated

Updated to match(es) played on unknown. Source: Ligue Magnus
Rules for classification: 1) Points; 2) Head-to-head points.
