= 2022–23 Ligue Magnus season =

2022–23 Ligue Magnus
- League: Ligue Magnus
- Sport: Ice hockey
- Duration: 9 September 2022 – 14 April 2023
- Teams: 12

Regular season
- Best record: Brûleurs de Loups
- Runners-up: Dragons de Rouen
- Relegated to Division 1: Diables Rouges de Briançon

Playoffs
- Finals champions: Dragons de Rouen
- Runners-up: Brûleurs de Loups

Ligue Magnus seasons
- ← 2021–22 2023–24 →

The 2022–23 Ligue Magnus season was the 102nd season of the Ligue Magnus, the top level of ice hockey in France. The regular season ran from 9 September 2022 to 3 March 2023. The Brûleurs de Loups finished atop the standings. The postseason ran from 7 March to 14 April, 2023. The Dragons de Rouen defeated the Brûleurs de Loups 4 games to 2 for the league championship. The Diables Rouges de Briançon were relegated to Division 1 at the end of the season.

== Teams ==
Ligue Magnus team map

Team	City	Arena	Founded
Gothiques d'Amiens	Amiens	Coliséum	1967
Ducs d'Angers	Angers	IceParc	1982
Anglet Hormadi	Anglet	Patinoire de la Barre	1969
Boxers de Bordeaux	Bordeaux	Patinoire de Mériadeck	1999
Diables Rouges de Briançon	Briançon	Patinoire René Froger	1934
Jokers de Cergy-Pontoise	Cergy-Pontoise	Aren'Ice	1981
Pionniers de Chamonix Mont-Blanc	Chamonix	Centre Sportif Richard Bozon	2016
Rapaces de Gap	Gap	Alp'Arena	1937
Brûleurs de Loups	Grenoble	Patinoire Pole Sud	1963
Scorpions de Mulhouse	Mulhouse	Patinoire de l'Illberg	2005
Aigles de Nice	Nice	Patinoire Jean Bouin	1969
Dragons de Rouen	Rouen	Centre sportif Guy-Boissière	1982

== Regular season ==
=== Standings ===
Pos	Team	Pld	W	OTW	OTL	L	GF	GA	GD	Pts	Qualification
1	Brûleurs de Loups	44	36	3	1	4	199	89	+110	115	Qualification to Play-offs
2	Dragons de Rouen	44	31	4	1	8	224	124	+100	102	Qualification to Play-offs
3	Ducs d'Angers	44	27	2	7	8	170	110	+60	92	Qualification to Play-offs
4	Jokers de Cergy-Pontoise	44	19	6	2	17	147	156	−9	71	Qualification to Play-offs
5	Rapaces de Gap	44	19	4	2	19	139	139	0	67	Qualification to Play-offs
6	Boxers de Bordeaux	44	17	3	7	17	149	142	+7	64	Qualification to Play-offs
7	Gothiques d'Amiens	44	18	1	2	23	127	134	−7	58	Qualification to Play-offs
8	Scorpions de Mulhouse (Note: Scorpions de Mulhouse were deprived of 4 points by a decision of the Federation.)	44	17	3	3	21	133	139	−6	56	Qualification to Play-offs
9	Pionniers de Chamonix Mont-Blanc	44	14	4	4	22	125	148	−23	54	Qualification to Play Out
10	Anglet Hormadi	44	11	5	6	22	111	196	−85	49	Qualification to Play Out
11	Aigles de Nice	44	9	6	4	25	110	141	−31	43	Qualification to Play Out
12	Diables Rouges de Briançon	44	3	2	4	35	84	200	−116	17	Qualification to Play Out

Updated to match(es) played on unknown. Source: Ligue Magnus
Rules for classification: 1) Points; 2) Head-to-head points.

=== Statistics ===
==== Scoring leaders ====
Player	Team	Pos	GP	G	A	Pts	PIM
(Canada) François Beauchemin	Dragons de Rouen	C/W	43	27	50	77	42
(Canada) Christophe Boivin	Dragons de Rouen	LW	44	34	39	73	33
(Canada) Tommy Giroux	Ducs d'Angers	LW	44	27	35	62	4
(Canada) Jonathan Charbonneau	Ducs d'Angers	RW	44	27	31	58	14
(Canada) Kelsey Tessier	Dragons de Rouen	C	44	28	29	57	12
(France) Loïc Lampérier	Dragons de Rouen	C/LW	44	17	35	52	32
(France) Julien Correia	Rapaces de Gap	F	44	17	34	51	18
(Canada) Nicolas Deschamps	Brûleurs de Loups	C/W	40	12	38	50	12
(Canada) Philippe Halley	Ducs d'Angers	C	40	18	31	49	62
(France) Sacha Treille	Brûleurs de Loups	LW/RW	39	21	26	47	91
(Canada) Sacha Guimond	Dragons de Rouen	D	44	7	40	47	19

==== Leading goaltenders ====
The following goaltenders led the league in goals against average, provided that they have played at least 1/3 of their team's minutes.

Player	Team	GP	TOI	W	L	GA	SO	SV%	GAA
(Czech Republic) Jakub Štěpánek	Brûleurs de Loups	33	1970	26	4	69	2	.921	2.10
(Slovenia) Matija Pintarič	Dragons de Rouen	22	1281	16	3	46	1	.938	2.16
(United States) Evan Cowley	Ducs d'Angers	38	2213	24	9	89	2	.924	2.24
(France) Quentin Papillon	Scorpions de Mulhouse	31	1824	12	14	75	1	.928	2.47
(France) Julian Junca	Rapaces de Gap	39	2292	17	16	101	3	.921	2.64

== Playoffs ==
=== Championship ===
Quarterfinals (best-of-7)
1	Brûleurs de Loups	3*	5	2	7	5*	-	-
8	Scorpions de Mulhouse	2	1	3	5	4	-	-
2	Dragons de Rouen	5	5	4*	4	-	-	-
7	Gothiques d'Amiens	2	0	3	3	-	-	-
(Pairings are re-seeded after the first round)
3	Ducs d'Angers	6	2*	5	4	-	-	-
6	Boxers de Bordeaux	1	1	2	1	-	-	-
4	Jokers de Cergy-Pontoise	6*	5	4*	3	5*	-	-
5	Rapaces de Gap	5	1	3	4**	4	-	-

Semifinals (best-of-7)
1	Brûleurs de Loups	9	4	7	8	-	-	-
4	Jokers de Cergy-Pontoise	2	2	1	2	-	-	-
2	Dragons de Rouen	4	1	5	3	4*	3	-
3	Ducs d'Angers	1	2	1	6	3	0	-

Championship (best-of-7)
1	Brûleurs de Loups	8	2	4	5	1	3	-
2	Dragons de Rouen	2	0	5*	6	2	4*	-

Note: * denotes overtime
Note: ** denotes overtime and shootout

=== Relegation ===
Home \ Away	ANH	BRI	CHA	NIC	ANH	BRI	CHA	NIC
Anglet Hormadi	—	2–3 ^{(OT)}	3–4 ^{(OT)}	3–2	—	6–3	1–4	5–3
Diables Rouges de Briançon	3–2 ^{(OT)}	—	2–4	4–3	3–6	—	2–4	0–2
Pionniers de Chamonix Mont-Blanc	4–3 ^{(OT)}	4–2	—	2–8	4–1	4–2	—	5–4 ^{(OT)}
Aigles de Nice	2–3	3–4	8–2	—	3–5	2–0	4–5 ^{(OT)}	—

Updated to match(es) played on Final. Source: Ligue Magnus
Legend: Blue = home team win; Yellow = draw; Red = away team win.

Pos	Team	Pld	W	OTW	OTL	L	GF	GA	GD	Pts	Qualification
1	Pionniers de Chamonix Mont-Blanc	6	3	2	0	1	23	20	+3	13	Saved
2	Anglet Hormadi	6	3	0	2	1	20	19	+1	11	Saved
3	Aigles de Nice	6	2	0	1	3	22	19	+3	7	Saved
4	Diables Rouges de Briançon	6	1	1	0	4	14	21	−7	5	Relegated

Updated to match(es) played on unknown. Source: Ligue Magnus
Rules for classification: 1) Points; 2) Head-to-head points.
