= 2024–25 Ligue Magnus season =

2024–25 Ligue Magnus
- League: Ligue Magnus
- Sport: Ice hockey
- Duration: 13 September 2024 – 5 April 2025
- Teams: 12

Regular season
- Best record: Brûleurs de Loups
- Runners-up: Ducs d'Angers
- Relegated to Division 1: none

Playoffs
- Finals champions: Brûleurs de Loups
- Runners-up: Ducs d'Angers

Ligue Magnus seasons
- ← 2023–24 2025–26 →

The 2024–25 Ligue Magnus season was the 104th season of the Ligue Magnus, the top level of ice hockey in France. The regular season ran from 13 September 2024 to 21 February 2025. The Brûleurs de Loups finished atop the standings. The postseason ran from 28 February to 5 April, 2025. The Brûleurs de Loups defeated the Ducs d'Angers 4 games to 2 for the league championship. While Rapaces de Gap finished last in the relegation round, the league announced that no promotions from Division 1 would occur, allowing Gap to avoid demotion.

== Teams ==
2024–25 Ligue Magnus team map

Team	City	State	Arena	Coach
Gothiques d'Amiens	Amiens	Hauts-de-France	Coliséum	(Canada) Mario Richer
Ducs d'Angers	Angers	Pays de la Loire	IceParc	(France) Jonathan Paredes
Anglet Hormadi	Anglet	Nouvelle-Aquitaine	Patinoire de la Barre	(France) Stéphane Barin
Boxers de Bordeaux	Bordeaux	Nouvelle-Aquitaine	Patinoire de Mériadeck	(France) Olivier Dimet
Diables Rouges de Briançon	Briançon	Provence-Alpes-Côte d'Azur	Patinoire René Froger	(Canada) Pierre Bergeron
Jokers de Cergy-Pontoise	Cergy-Pontoise	Île-de-France	Aren'Ice	(Finland) Miika Elomo
Pionniers de Chamonix Mont-Blanc	Chamonix	Auvergne-Rhône-Alpes	Centre Sportif Richard Bozon	(Ukraine) Anatoli Bogdanov
Rapaces de Gap	Gap	Provence-Alpes-Côte d'Azur	Alp'Arena	(France) Sébastien Rohat
Brûleurs de Loups	Grenoble	Auvergne-Rhône-Alpes	Patinoire Pole Sud	(Sweden) Per Hånberg
Spartiates de Marseille	Marseille	Provence-Alpes-Côte d'Azur	Palais Omnisports Marseille Grand-Est	(France) Luc Tardif
Aigles de Nice	Nice	Provence-Alpes-Côte d'Azur	Patinoire Jean Bouin	(Slovakia) Frantisek Stolc (France) Pascal Margerit
Dragons de Rouen	Rouen	Normandy	Centre sportif Guy-Boissière	(France) Fabrice Lhenry

== Regular season ==
=== Standings ===
Pos	Team	Pld	W	OTW	OTL	L	GF	GA	GD	Pts	Qualification
1	Brûleurs de Loups	44	32	5	2	5	212	93	+119	108	Qualification to Play-offs
2	Ducs d'Angers	44	29	3	1	11	177	111	+66	94	Qualification to Play-offs
3	Boxers de Bordeaux	44	23	6	4	11	142	98	+44	85	Qualification to Play-offs
4	Dragons de Rouen	44	26	1	3	14	182	144	+38	83	Qualification to Play-offs
5	Gothiques d'Amiens	44	17	6	5	16	127	135	−8	68	Qualification to Play-offs
6	Spartiates de Marseille	44	16	4	4	20	138	148	−10	60	Qualification to Play-offs
7	Pionniers de Chamonix Mont-Blanc	44	12	6	7	19	126	134	−8	55	Qualification to Play-offs
8	Aigles de Nice	44	15	0	7	22	89	134	−45	52	Qualification to Play-offs
9	Diables Rouges de Briançon	44	14	3	3	24	115	153	−38	51	Qualification to Play Out
10	Jokers de Cergy-Pontoise	44	12	4	6	22	123	151	−28	50	Qualification to Play Out
11	Anglet Hormadi	44	8	7	5	24	103	164	−61	43	Qualification to Play Out
12	Rapaces de Gap	44	8	7	5	24	111	180	−69	43	Qualification to Play Out

Updated to match(es) played on unknown. Source: Ligue Magnus
Rules for classification: 1) Points; 2) Head-to-head points.

=== Statistics ===
==== Scoring leaders ====
Player	Team	Pos	GP	G	A	Pts	PIM
(Canada) Brady Shaw	Ducs d'Angers	LW/RW	43	36	24	60	13
(Canada) Christophe Boivin	Brûleurs de Loups	LW	42	29	28	57	26
(Czech Republic) Jan Dufek	Spartiates de Marseille	C/W	44	20	33	53	13
(Canada) Kyle Hardy	Brûleurs de Loups	D	44	14	37	51	31
(Canada) François Beauchemin	Brûleurs de Loups	C/W	40	14	34	48	46
(Latvia) Rolands Vīgners	Dragons de Rouen	LW/RW	43	16	31	47	10
(Canada) Alexandre Mallet	Brûleurs de Loups	C/RW	38	19	27	46	55
(France) Anthony Rech	Dragons de Rouen	LW/RW	42	19	27	46	22
(Sweden) Alexis Binner	Brûleurs de Loups	D	43	12	32	44	26
(Canada) Matt Wilkins	Ducs d'Angers	C/LW	37	14	29	43	32
(Sweden) Sebastian Bengtsson	Dragons de Rouen	LW/RW	40	10	33	43	6

==== Leading goaltenders ====
The following goaltenders led the league in goals against average, provided that they have played at least 1/3 of their team's minutes.

Player	Team	GP	TOI	W	L	GA	SO	SV%	GAA
(France) Quentin Papillon	Boxers de Bordeaux	38	2245	20	11	66	6	.933	1.76
(Czech Republic) Jakub Štěpánek	Brûleurs de Loups	18	1076	15	2	35	3	.930	1.95
(Slovenia) Matija Pintarič	Brûleurs de Loups	26	1568	17	5	53	6	.933	2.03
(Canada) Matt O'Connor	Ducs d'Angers	33	1980	22	9	70	2	.920	2.12
(Estonia) Conrad Mölder	Aigles de Nice	33	1862	13	18	83	1	.918	2.67

== Playoffs ==
=== Championship ===
Quarterfinals (best-of-7)
1	Brûleurs de Loups	3	5	4	2	-	-	-
8	Aigles de Nice	1	2	1	1	-	-	-
2	Ducs d'Angers	2	4	4	5	1	2*	-
7	Pionniers de Chamonix Mont-Blanc	5	0	0	1	2*	1	-
(Pairings are re-seeded after the first round)
3	Boxers de Bordeaux	3	1	4	4	1	4	-
6	Spartiates de Marseille	0	2	1	1	5	1	-
4	Dragons de Rouen	3	3	4	2	6	0	2
5	Gothiques d'Amiens	1	4	3	0	7**	1	3

Semifinals (best-of-7)
1	Brûleurs de Loups	4	3	5	7	3	-	-
5	Gothiques d'Amiens	5**	0	3	1	2	-	-
2	Ducs d'Angers	4	3*	2*	2	-	-	-
3	Boxers de Bordeaux	3	2	1	1	-	-	-

Championship (best-of-7)
1	Brûleurs de Loups	4	4	2	2	6	-	-
2	Ducs d'Angers	2	0	0	4	2	-	-

Note: * denotes overtime
Note: ** denotes overtime and shootout

=== Relegation ===
Home \ Away	ANH	BRI	CER	GAP	ANH	BRI	CER	GAP
Anglet Hormadi	—	2–1 ^{(OT)}	9–0	2–4	—	3–0	2–1	4–3
Diables Rouges de Briançon	1–2 ^{(OT)}	—	4–1	3–0	0–3	—	4–1	3–1
Jokers de Cergy-Pontoise	0–9	1–4	—	1–4	1–2	1–4	—	5–2
Rapaces de Gap	4–2	0–3	4–1	—	3–4	1–3	2–5	—

Updated to match(es) played on Final. Source: Ligue Magnus
Legend: Blue = home team win; Yellow = draw; Red = away team win.

Pos	Team	Pld	W	OTW	OTL	L	GF	GA	GD	Pts	Qualification
1	Diables Rouges de Briançon (Note: Teams retained their points from the regular season.)	6	4	0	1	1	15	8	+7	64	Saved
2	Anglet Hormadi	6	4	1	0	1	22	9	+13	57	Saved
3	Jokers de Cergy-Pontoise	6	1	0	0	5	9	25	−16	53	Saved
4	Rapaces de Gap	6	2	0	0	4	14	18	−4	49	Saved

Updated to match(es) played on unknown. Source: Ligue Magnus
Rules for classification: 1) Points; 2) Head-to-head points.
