= 2023–24 Ligue Magnus season =

2023–24 Ligue Magnus
- League: Ligue Magnus
- Sport: Ice hockey
- Duration: 9 September 2023 – 15 April 2024
- Teams: 12

Regular season
- Best record: Dragons de Rouen
- Runners-up: Ducs d'Angers
- Relegated to Division 1: Diables Rouges de Briançon

Playoffs
- Finals champions: Dragons de Rouen
- Runners-up: Boxers de Bordeaux

Ligue Magnus seasons
- ← 2022–23 2024–25 →

The 2023–24 Ligue Magnus season was the 103rd season of the Ligue Magnus, the top level of ice hockey in France. The regular season ran from 9 September 2023 to 1 March 2024. The Dragons de Rouen finished atop the standings. The postseason ran from 8 March to 15 April 2024. The Dragons de Rouen defeated the Boxers de Bordeaux 4 games to 2 for the league championship. The Diables Rouges de Briançon were relegated to Division 1 at the end of the season.

== Member changes ==
- The Diables Rouges de Briançon were slated to be relegated to Division 1, however, the Scorpions de Mulhouse declared bankruptcy in May 2023 and were removed from the league. As a result, Briançon remained in Ligue Magnus while Mulhouse was replaced by Spartiates de Marseille.

== Teams ==
2023–24 Ligue Magnus team map

Team	City	Arena	Coach
Gothiques d'Amiens	Amiens	Coliséum	(Canada) Mario Richer
Ducs d'Angers	Angers	IceParc	(Canada) Jason O'Leary
Anglet Hormadi	Anglet	Patinoire de la Barre	(France) Pierrick Rézard
Boxers de Bordeaux	Bordeaux	Patinoire de Mériadeck	(France) Olivier Dimet
Diables Rouges de Briançon	Briançon	Patinoire René Froger	(Hungary) Márton Vas
Jokers de Cergy-Pontoise	Cergy-Pontoise	Aren'Ice	(Finland) Miika Elomo
Pionniers de Chamonix Mont-Blanc	Chamonix	Centre Sportif Richard Bozon	(Finland) Janne Sinkkonen
Rapaces de Gap	Gap	Alp'Arena	(France) Eric Blais, (France) Sébastien Oprandi
Brûleurs de Loups	Grenoble	Patinoire Pole Sud	(Finland) Jyrki Aho, (Canada) Jean-François Dufour, (Slovenia) Edo Terglav
Spartiates de Marseille	Marseille	Palais Omnisports Marseille Grand-Est	(France) Luc Tardif
Aigles de Nice	Nice	Patinoire Jean Bouin	(Slovakia) Frantisek Stolc
Dragons de Rouen	Rouen	Centre sportif Guy-Boissière	(France) Fabrice Lhenry

== Regular season ==
=== Standings ===
Pos	Team	Pld	W	OTW	OTL	L	GF	GA	GD	Pts	Qualification
1	Dragons de Rouen	44	35	2	1	6	194	105	+89	110	Qualification to Play-offs
2	Ducs d'Angers	44	33	1	0	10	164	104	+60	101	Qualification to Play-offs
3	Brûleurs de Loups	44	28	2	2	12	184	113	+71	90	Qualification to Play-offs
4	Boxers de Bordeaux	44	19	5	4	16	148	126	+22	71	Qualification to Play-offs
5	Spartiates de Marseille	44	19	4	1	20	114	111	+3	66	Qualification to Play-offs
6	Gothiques d'Amiens	44	18	3	5	18	144	149	−5	65	Qualification to Play-offs
7	Jokers de Cergy-Pontoise (Note: Jokers de Cergy-Pontoise were deprived of 6 points by a decision of the Federation.)	44	20	2	5	17	142	132	+10	63	Qualification to Play-offs
8	Aigles de Nice	44	15	4	1	24	128	174	−46	54	Qualification to Play-offs
9	Pionniers de Chamonix Mont-Blanc	44	13	4	4	23	111	147	−36	51	Qualification to Play Out
10	Anglet Hormadi	44	10	2	6	26	116	170	−54	40	Qualification to Play Out
11	Diables Rouges de Briançon	44	11	2	2	29	110	174	−64	39	Qualification to Play Out
12	Rapaces de Gap	44	11	1	1	31	118	168	−50	36	Qualification to Play Out

Updated to match(es) played on unknown. Source: Ligue Magnus
Rules for classification: 1) Points; 2) Head-to-head points.

=== Statistics ===
==== Scoring leaders ====
Player	Team	Pos	GP	G	A	Pts	PIM
(Canada) Alexandre Lavoie	Brûleurs de Loups	C/RW	43	15	42	57	14
(Canada) Nicolas Deschamps	Brûleurs de Loups	C/W	43	17	36	53	20
(Russia) Nikita Scherbak	Ducs d'Angers	LW/RW	41	10	37	47	63
(Latvia) Rolands Vīgners	Dragons de Rouen	LW/RW	41	27	19	46	10
(United States) Alex Barber	Jokers de Cergy-Pontoise	F	43	21	25	46	36
(Finland) Samuel Salonen	Boxers de Bordeaux	RW	44	21	25	46	10
(France) Anthony Rech	Dragons de Rouen	LW/RW	43	19	27	46	28
(France) Tomas Simonsen	Gothiques d'Amiens	RW	44	21	23	44	10
(France) Loïc Lampérier	Dragons de Rouen	C/LW	42	20	24	44	14
(Finland) Aleksi Hämäläinen	Jokers de Cergy-Pontoise	C/LW	44	16	28	44	24

==== Leading goaltenders ====
The following goaltenders led the league in goals against average, provided that they have played at least 1/3 of their team's minutes.

Player	Team	GP	TOI	W	L	GA	SO	SV%	GAA
(United States) Evan Cowley	Ducs d'Angers	39	2319	30	8	78	7	.935	2.02
(France) Raphaël Garnier	Brûleurs de Loups	16	971	10	3	34	2	.918	2.10
(Slovenia) Matija Pintarič	Dragons de Rouen	40	2252	29	5	82	0	.929	2.18
(Czech Republic) Marek Čiliak	Spartiates de Marseille	39	2281	17	16	87	5	.927	2.29
(France) Quentin Papillon	Boxers de Bordeaux	34	2013	15	12	82	1	.927	2.45

== Playoffs ==
=== Championship ===
Quarterfinals (best-of-7)
1	Dragons de Rouen	5	3	3	4	6	-	-
8	Aigles de Nice	1	2	4*	2	3	-	-
2	Ducs d'Angers	1	5	0	1	5	1	-
7	Jokers de Cergy-Pontoise	3	2	3	3	2	3	-
(Pairings are re-seeded after the first round)
3	Brûleurs de Loups	5	5	6	3	-	-	-
6	Gothiques d'Amiens	3	1	2	2	-	-	-
4	Boxers de Bordeaux	5	1	5	1	2	4	2*
5	Spartiates de Marseille	2	2	2	3	3**	0	1

Semifinals (best-of-7)
1	Dragons de Rouen	7	5	6	5	-	-	-
7	Jokers de Cergy-Pontoise	2	2	1	1	-	-	-
3	Brûleurs de Loups	2	1	4	3	3	-	-
4	Boxers de Bordeaux	3	3	2	4	4	-	-

Championship (best-of-7)
1	Dragons de Rouen	2	2	6	2*	5	3*	-
4	Boxers de Bordeaux	3	4	3	1	3	2	-

Note: * denotes overtime
Note: ** denotes overtime and shootout

=== Relegation ===
Home \ Away	ANH	BRI	CHA	GAP	ANH	BRI	CHA	GAP
Anglet Hormadi	—	5–1	5–2	5–3	—	3–6	4–6	4–3
Diables Rouges de Briançon	1–5	—	1–2	4–5	6–3	—	5–1	3–5
Pionniers de Chamonix Mont-Blanc	2–5	2–1	—	3–6	6–4	1–5	—	4–1
Rapaces de Gap	3–5	5–4	6–3	—	3–4	5–3	1–4	—

Updated to match(es) played on Final. Source: Ligue Magnus
Legend: Blue = home team win; Yellow = draw; Red = away team win.

Pos	Team	Pld	W	OTW	OTL	L	GF	GA	GD	Pts	Qualification
1	Pionniers de Chamonix Mont-Blanc	6	3	0	0	3	18	22	−4	9	Saved
2	Anglet Hormadi	6	4	0	0	2	26	21	+5	12	Saved
3	Rapaces de Gap	6	3	0	0	3	23	23	0	9	Saved
4	Diables Rouges de Briançon	6	2	0	0	4	20	21	−1	6	Relegated

Updated to match(es) played on unknown. Source: Ligue Magnus
Rules for classification: 1) Points; 2) Head-to-head points.
