= Jokers de Cergy-Pontoise =

Professional ice hockey in Cergy-Pontoise, France

- City: Cergy, France
- League: Ligue Magnus; 2019–present
- Founded: 1981; 45 years ago
- Home arena: Aren'Ice
- Colors: Green, red
- Website: www.lesjokers.net

Franchise history
- 1977-1981: Club des sports de glace de Cergy
- 1981-1994: Hockey club de Cergy-Pontoise
- 1994-present: Hockey club de Cergy-Pontoise; Les Jokers

The Jokers de Cergy-Pontoise (English: Cergy-Pontoise Jesters), formally known as Hockey club de Cergy-Pontoise, are a French ice hockey club based in Cergy, Val-d'Oise and representing the Cergy-Pontoise agglomeration. As of the 2026-27 season, they are the top ranked hockey team in the Paris Region, and the only one playing at the highest level of the French ice hockey pyramid, the Ligue Magnus.

== History ==
=== Men's hockey ===
While the multisport Club des sports de glace de Cergy had offered a hockey program since 1977, the independent Hockey club de Cergy-Pontoise was founded in 1981.

For the following decades, its flagship men's team toiled in various minor leagues without much fanfare, playing out of Cergy's unspectacular municipal ice rink, a limited seating venue mostly designed for recreational activities. This changed in 2009, when the city was chosen by the French Ice Hockey Federation as the site of its future National Ice Hockey Center, brand new federation headquarters incorporating an arena slated to host most Team France training camps, as well as a local resident club. The building was inaugurated in 2016 under the name Aren'Ice.

Buoyed by the city's commitment to the sport and their attractive new venue, the Jokers earned promotion to the Ligue Magnus in 2020, as they stood atop the Division 1 standings (France's second level) when the season was cut short by the COVID-19 pandemic.

=== Women's hockey ===
Prior to the men's team's promotion to the top level, the club was most notable for its women's hockey section, which has won a record 18 senior national titles.

On 28 February 2004, women's team captain and Team France member Christine Duchamp became the first woman to take part in a non-recreational men's hockey game in France, when she skated 4:55 minutes in a Division 1 (second level) game against Asnières.

For its pioneering role in the development of the women's game, the club was inducted into the Builders category of the French Ice Hockey Hall of Fame in 2009, only the second organization to be so honored after Chamonix.

== Current roster ==
Updated 9 November 2024.

No.	Nat	Player	Pos	S/G	Age	Acquired	Birthplace
19	(France)	Antoine Addamo	LW	L	22	2024	Beaumont, France
13	(United States)	Alex Barber	F	R	27	2023	Dublin, Ohio, United States
83	(Canada)	Danick Bouchard	LW	L	40	2024	Lorraine, Quebec, Canada
11	(France)	Raphaël Brites	D	L	21	2023	Paris, France
5	(Canada)	Patrick Coulombe (C)	D	L	41	2022	Saint-Fabien, Quebec, Canada
77	(France)	Colin Delatour	F	L	23	2024	Pontoise, France
48	(France)	Aurélien Dorey (A)	D	L	32	2022	Mont-Saint-Aignan, France
41	(France)	Raphaël Faure (A)		L	33	2022	Caen, France
86	(Latvia)	Daniels Goršānovs	D	R	24	2023	Jelgava, Latvia
90	(France)	Arthur Hostein	F	L	18	2024	Pontoise, France
80	(Finland)	Aleksi Hämäläinen (A)	C	L	30	2023	Suonenjoki, Finland
95	(France)	Sayan Limtong	F	R	24	2023	Montmorency, France
7	(France)	Vincent Melin	D	L	28	2021	Arras, France
23	(Finland)	Kalle Myllymaa	C	L	24	2024	Pori, Finland
82	(France)	Tomas Pardo	F	L	22	2022	Barcelona, Spain
15	(France)	Philéas Perrenoud	C	L	22	2023	Strasbourg, France
6	(France)	Louis Petit	W	R	28	2020	Saint-Vallier, France
1	(France)	Olivier Richard	G	L	30	2023	Aix-en-Provence, France
24	(France)	Nikita Shalei	D	R	25	2023	Minsk, Belarus
88	(Canada)	Christopher Theodore	LW	L	28	2024	Beaconsfield, Quebec, Canada
71	(Canada)	Tyler Welsh	RW	R	29	2024	Whistler, British Columbia, Canada
37	(France)	Sebastian Ylönen	G	L	35	2020	Rouen, France

== Trophies and awards ==
- French Women's Senior Championship
  - (x18) 1991, 1992, 1993, 1994, 1996, 1997, 1998, 2000, 2001, 2002, 2003, 2004, 2005, 2006, 2007, 2008, 2009, 2017
- French women's Nationale 1 (inline hockey)
  - (x2) 2006, 2007

== Notable players ==
=== French Ice Hockey Hall of Fame ===
- Gwenola Personne (2021)
