= Richard Bozon Ice Rink =

Ice rink in France

Patinoire Richard-Bozon
- Interactive map of Patinoire Richard-Bozon
- Former names: Patinoire olympique de Chamonix
- Location: 165 Route de la Patinoire; Chamonix
- Coordinates: 45°55′39″N 6°52′20″E
- Owner: City of Chamonix
- Capacity: 2063
- Field size: 60 × 30 metre (indoor); 56 × 26 metre (outdoor)

Construction
- Opened: February 1962
- Architect: Bouvier et Chevallier Architectes

Tenants
- Chamonix Mont-Blanc Pionniers (1962–present); Chamonix Rebelles (2012–present)

Richard Bozon Ice Rink (French: Patinoire Richard-Bozon) is an ice rink located in Chamonix, Haute-Savoie, France. It is part of Centre sportif Richard-Bozon, a multisports ensemble, and the broader Pôle sportif et culturel Chamonix Nord (which includes several educational facilities), in the northern part of the city.
It is best known as the longtime home of Chamonix's men's professional ice hockey team, which currently goes by the name Pionniers de Chamonix Mont-Blanc. It is also home to the Rebelles de Chamonix senior women's team.

== History ==
The building was inaugurated in 1962, at the same time as the 17th Alpine World Ski Championships, which also took place in Chamonix. It is the oldest venue in the Ligue Magnus.

It was originally known as Patinoire olympique de Chamonix (English: Chamonix Olympic Ice Rink), a reference to its Olympic-size ice track rather than to the Olympic Stadium it replaced. The rink, along with the rest of northern Chamonix's public sports installations, was renamed in memory of mountain guide Richard Bozon, who lost his life to an avalanche in 1995—the third member of the Bozon family to so die after his grand father and his uncle, World Champion skier Charles Bozon.

In the summer of 1996, the rink was severely damaged by an overflow of the river Arve, which caused the men's hockey team (at the time called the Huskies) to suspend its operations for the entire 1996–97 season.

== Design ==
The building's design is sometimes attributed to internationally recognized architect Roger Taillibert, who drew the swimming pool and gymnasium that were later built on the adjoining land. However, the ice rink itself was the work of local architects Henri Chevallier and René Bouvier, who regularly consulted for the city and designed a number of buildings in the Chamonix Valley, including the nearby Alpina Hotel and Shopping Center.

A second, natural outdoor hockey rink was originally set up on the south side of the building, then scrapped in the early 1970s to make room for a high school. It was rebuilt a few years later, this time on the north side where more land was available.

== Replacement ==
For a time, the construction of a replacement rink was tied to Annecy's bid for the 2018 Winter Olympics, which would have seen Chamonix host some or all of the hockey tournament, but the bid proved unpopular and was not renewed for subsequent games. In 2021, Chamonix mayor Éric Fournier announced on the occasion of a visit by French Ice Hockey Federation president and former Chamonix player Luc Tardif that a new building had been approved. Under consideration is a dual ice hockey and competitive climbing venue, replacing both Patinoire Richard-Bozon and the neighbouring ENSA Gymnasium.

== Notable events ==
- 1972 French Figure Skating Championships
- 1986 World Short Track Speed Skating Championships
