= Dany Sabourin =

Canadian ice hockey player and coach

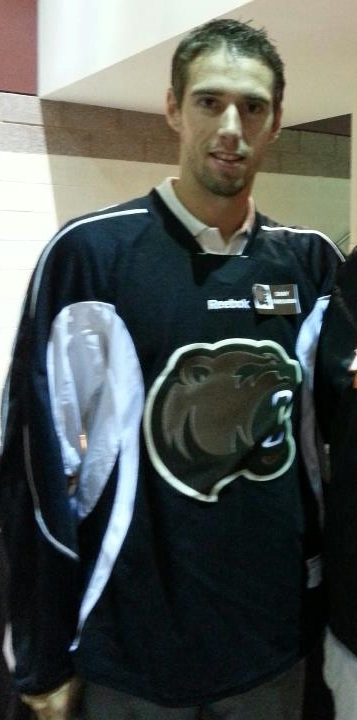
- Sabourin with the Hershey Bears in 2012
- Born: September 2, 1980 (age 45) Val-d'Or, Quebec, Canada
- Height: 6 ft 4 in (193 cm)
- Weight: 200 lb (91 kg; 14 st 4 lb)
- Position: Goaltender
- Caught: Left
- Played for: Calgary Flames; Pittsburgh Penguins; Vancouver Canucks; Graz 99ers Dragons de Rouen
- NHL draft: 108th overall, 1998; Calgary Flames
- Playing career: 2000–2017

Dany Sabourin (born September 2, 1980) is a Canadian professional ice hockey coach and former goaltender.

== Playing career ==
Drafted in the fourth round, 108th overall by the Calgary Flames in the 1998 NHL entry draft, he played four games with Calgary before moving to the Pittsburgh Penguins. In 2006, he was awarded the Baz Bastien Memorial Trophy as top goaltender in the AHL after achieving 30 wins in 49 games with Pittsburgh's AHL farm team in Wilkes-Barre. In October 2006, the Vancouver Canucks claimed him via waivers, where he served as backup to Roberto Luongo.

On February 20, 2007, Sabourin achieved his first NHL win in 12 career games, when the Canucks defeated the Anaheim Ducks in overtime, by a score of 3–2.

On April 25, 2007, he made his playoff debut during the last 10 minutes of the third period when Roberto Luongo was pulled after Anaheim scored their 4th goal in the first game of the series. Anaheim scored their fifth goal on Sabourin during the final minute of the game, ending with a score of 5–1.

On May 3, 2007, he made his second playoff appearance in the first few minutes of overtime with the Vancouver Canucks facing elimination in Game 5 against the Ducks. He made five saves before being replaced back by Luongo, who was delayed by what was thought to be equipment problems. However, after the game, it was revealed Luongo had an untimely case of diarrhea. The Canucks later lost the game 2–1 in double overtime.

On July 1, 2007, Sabourin was signed by the Pittsburgh Penguins as an unrestricted free agent, recording 10 wins for the Penguins in the 2007–08 NHL season.

On January 17, 2009, Sabourin was traded to the Edmonton Oilers along with forward Ryan Stone and a fourth round draft pick for goaltender Mathieu Garon. However, general manager Steve Tambellini declared on the day of the trade that he had no intention of bringing Sabourin to the Edmonton Oilers club. Instead, the Oilers stated that they intended to trade or waive Sabourin, who finished the year with Edmonton's AHL affiliate Springfield Falcons.

On July 7, 2009, he signed a one-year contract with the Boston Bruins. He was then assigned to AHL affiliate, the Providence Bruins for 2009–10.

On July 1, 2010, Sabourin signed a one-year deal with the Washington Capitals. He was assigned to AHL affiliate, the Hershey Bears on October 15. Sabourin spent the next three seasons within the Capitals organization, spending his entirety of his tenure as the Bears veteran goaltender.

On July 2, 2013, Sabourin opted to sign his first European contract, agreeing to a one-year deal with Austrian club, Graz 99ers of the EBEL. As the starting goalie for Graz over the following two seasons, Sabourin was a workhorse appearing in every game as the club missed the post-season on each occasion.

Sabourin opted to continue his European career as a free agent by signing with French Ligue Magnus club, Dragons de Rouen on April 7, 2015. After the 2016–17 season, Sabourin retired from professional hockey.

== Coaching career ==
In 2019, Sabourin served as the goaltending coach for the Rouyn-Noranda Huskies of the QMJHL, where he worked with San Jose Sharks prospect Zachary Emond and won the 2019 Memorial Cup. The following season, he joined the Sharks' American Hockey League affiliate San Jose Barracuda as goaltending development coach.

== Career statistics ==
=== Regular season and playoffs ===
			Regular season										Playoffs
Season	Team	League	GP	W	L	T	OTL	MIN	GA	SO	GAA	SV%	GP	W	L	MIN	GA	SO	GAA	SV%
1997–98	Sherbrooke Faucons	QMJHL	37	15	15	2	—	1907	128	1	4.03	.877	—	—	—	—	—	—	—	—
1998–99	Sherbrooke Castors	QMJHL	30	8	13	2	—	1477	102	1	4.14	.879	1	0	1	49	2	0	2.45	.917
1998–99	Saint John Flames	AHL	—	—	—	—	—	—	—	—	—	—	1	0	1	57	4	0	4.19	.840
1999–00	Sherbrooke Castors	QMJHL	55	25	22	5	—	3066	181	1	3.54	.889	5	1	4	324	18	0	3.33	.888
2000–01	Johnstown Chiefs	ECHL	19	4	9	1	—	903	56	0	3.72	.879	1	0	0	40	2	0	3.00	.800
2000–01	Saint John Flames	AHL	1	1	0	0	—	40	0	0	0.00	1.000	—	—	—	—	—	—	—	—
2001–02	Johnstown Chiefs	ECHL	27	14	10	1	—	1539	84	0	3.28	.892	3	0	2	137	5	0	2.18	.936
2001–02	Saint John Flames	AHL	10	4	4	0	—	447	18	1	2.41	.909	—	—	—	—	—	—	—	—
2002–03	Saint John Flames	AHL	41	15	17	4	—	2220	100	4	2.70	.905	—	—	—	—	—	—	—	—
2003–04	Lowell Lock Monsters	AHL	14	5	7	2	—	821	39	0	2.85	.904	—	—	—	—	—	—	—	—
2003–04	Calgary Flames	NHL	4	0	3	0	—	168	10	0	3.57	.848	—	—	—	—	—	—	—	—
2003–04	Las Vegas Wranglers	ECHL	10	6	3	1	—	613	24	0	2.35	.937	1	0	1	58	2	0	2.07	.944
2004–05	Wheeling Nailers	ECHL	27	19	6	1	—	1578	44	5	1.67	.942	—	—	—	—	—	—	—	—
2004–05	Wilkes-Barre/Scranton Penguins	AHL	20	8	8	2	—	1028	38	1	2.22	.921	—	—	—	—	—	—	—	—
2005–06	Wilkes-Barre/Scranton Penguins	AHL	49	30	14	—	4	2943	111	4	2.26	.922	6	2	4	362	13	1	2.15	.927
2005–06	Pittsburgh Penguins	NHL	1	0	1	—	0	21	4	0	11.68	.714	—	—	—	—	—	—	—	—
2006–07	Vancouver Canucks	NHL	9	2	4	—	1	480	21	0	2.62	.906	2	0	0	14	1	0	4.28	.909
2006–07	Manitoba Moose	AHL	2	1	1	—	0	119	4	1	2.01	.920	—	—	—	—	—	—	—	—
2007–08	Pittsburgh Penguins	NHL	24	10	9	—	1	1241	57	2	2.75	.904	—	—	—	—	—	—	—	—
2008–09	Pittsburgh Penguins	NHL	19	6	8	—	2	989	47	0	2.85	.898	—	—	—	—	—	—	—	—
2008–09	Springfield Falcons	AHL	13	5	6	—	2	795	42	0	3.17	.904	—	—	—	—	—	—	—	—
2009–10	Providence Bruins	AHL	56	28	27	—	0	3278	146	3	2.67	.915	—	—	—	—	—	—	—	—
2010–11	Hershey Bears	AHL	23	14	9	—	0	1299	53	2	2.45	.908	—	—	—	—	—	—	—	—
2011–12	Hershey Bears	AHL	37	18	12	—	5	2047	94	2	2.76	.909	5	2	3	301	16	0	3.19	.882
2012–13	Hershey Bears	AHL	28	9	13	—	3	1521	69	0	2.72	.903	—	—	—	—	—	—	—	—
2013–14	Graz 99ers	EBEL	45	—	—	—	—	2610	114	2	2.45	.892	—	—	—	—	—	—	—	—
2014–15	Graz 99ers	EBEL	54	24	30	0	—	3226	145	3	2.70	.919	—	—	—	—	—	—	—	—
2015–16	Dragons de Rouen	FRA	24	—	—	—	—	—	—	—	2.62	.892	15	—	—	—	—	—	2.15	.919
2016–17	Dragons de Rouen	FRA	43	—	—	—	—	—	—	—	2.30	.913	17	—	—	—	—	—	2.88	.892
NHL totals			57	18	25	0	4	2901	139	2	2.87	.898	2	0	0	14	1	0	4.28	.909

Awards and achievements
Preceded by Ryan Miller	Aldege "Baz" Bastien Memorial Award; 2005–06	Succeeded by Jason LaBarbera
