= Heikki Leime =

Finnish ice hockey player and coach

- Born: May 7, 1962 (age 64) Turku, Finland
- Height: 6 ft 0 in (183 cm)
- Weight: 196 lb (89 kg; 14 st 0 lb)
- Position: Defense
- Shot: Left
- Played for: TPS; Rochester Americans
- Coached for: TPS
- National team: Finland
- NHL draft: 143rd overall, 1981; Buffalo Sabres
- Playing career: 1980–1992
- Coaching career: 1995–2020

Heikki Leime (born May 7, 1962 in Turku) is a Finnish professional ice hockey coach and a former professional ice hockey player. He served as head coach of Swiss team EHC Olten until March 12, 2016.

== Playing career ==
Leime is a product of Turku-based club TPS. He made the roster of the Finnish junior national team in the late 1970s and played his first professional game during the 1980-81 season, representing his hometown team TPS in the country’s top-tier division.

He was selected by the Buffalo Sabres in the 1981 NHL Draft (7th round, 143rd overall) and played in 136 games for Buffalo’s AHL affiliate Rochester Americans from 1982 to 1986. He was a member of the Americans’ 1982 championship squad.

Leime returned to his native Finland in 1986, joining first division side TPS. Until the end of his playing career in 1992, Leime won three consecutive Liiga championships (1989, 90 and 91) with the club and represented his country at the 1990 World Championships. Leime earned a total of 16 caps for the Finnish national team.

== Coaching career ==
Leime served as director of the TPS club from 1992 to 1995 and then accepted the position as head coach at French side HC Caen. During his five-year tenure, he coached the team to promotion to the country’s top-tier Ligue Magnus.

In 2000, Leime was appointed head coach of the French national team. Under his guidance, France qualified for the 2004 World Championships, where they finished in last place.

Leime then had head coaching stints at Angers of France, Lausanne HC and HC Sierre of Switzerland and returned to Angers for a second spell. After the 2009-10 season, he was granted permission by the Angers club to leave for his hometown team TPS, who had offered him the job as head coach. However, his TPS tenure ended in October 2010, when Leime was relieved of his duties.

In November 2011, he was named head coach of Gothiques d’Amiens of the French Ligue Magnus and remained in the position until the end of the 2013-14 season, when he did not have his contract renewed.

Leime was hired as head coach of EHC Olten of the Swiss second division National League B (NLB) in December 2014. He coached Olten to the NLB playoff semifinals in 2015-16 and was released in the middle of the series in March 2016, after a 1-6 loss to HC Ajoie.

In March 2019, he becomes the new head coach of Anglet Hormadi Élite in the French Ligue Magnus.
