= Nice hockey Côte d'Azur =

Les Aigles de Nice
- City: Nice, France
- League: Ligue Magnus
- Home arena: Palais des sports Jean-Bouin (capacity: 1200)
- Colours: Red, black, yellow
- Owner(s): Jean-Hubert Morin
- General manager: Nicolas Tomasini
- Head coach: Frantisek Stolc
- Captain: Marc-André Lévesque

Nice Hockey Côte d'Azur or Les Aigles de Nice are a French ice hockey team based in Nice also known as "Les Aigles de Nice". The Eagles are members of the Ligue Magnus and play their home games at Palais des sports Jean-Bouin.

== History ==
=== Nice Hockey Club ===
Nice Hockey Club was founded in 1969, and initially played in Division 2, at the time the lowest tier of Ice Hockey in France. Following the culmination of the 1979 season, Nice were promoted to Division 1, the 2nd tier. After spending four seasons in Division 1, a fire destroyed Nice's rink, and thus they were relegated back to Division 2. After finding a new rink at the Palais des Sports Jean-Bouin, Nice were promoted back to Division 1 at the end of the 1984 season having won Division 2.

After spending four seasons in Division 1, Nice were once again demoted to the third tier of French hockey, however, following a spate of liquidations, the FFHG were forced to merge the top two divisions, and as such Nice found themselves back in Division 1. The Les Aigles (the Eagles) moniker was adopted by the club in 1994. The Eagles remained in Division 1 until the 1998–99 season, wherein they forfeited the season and were relegated to Division 3. Following a league wide reshuffle, the team was again promoted to Division 2 after the 2000–01 season. Nice would continue to play in Division 2 for two more seasons, before folding due to financial difficulties in 2003.

=== Nice hockey Côte d'Azur ===
The team would return the following season with a new name, Nice hockey Côte d'Azur. In their first season back in Division 3, NCHA finished as champions and promotion to Division 2. The Eagles gained promotion from Division 2 four years later following the culmination of the 2007–08 season. Nice would go on to win the 2015-16 Division 2, and following a play-off final victory against Anglet, they would be promoted to the Ligue Magnus for the first time in the club's history. As of the 2014-15 the Eagles also have a feeder team playing in Division 3.

== Roster ==
Updated 11 November 2024.

No.	Nat	Player	Pos	S/G	Age	Acquired	Birthplace
21	(Latvia)	Daniels Bērziņš	C	L	26	2024	Riga, Latvia
2	(Latvia)	Harijs Brants	D	L	23	2024	Valmiera, Latvia
66	(France)	Joseph Broutin	C	L	24	2024	Saint-Pol-sur-Mer, France
9	(France)	Louis Cirgues	D	R	24	2024	Gap, France
37	(France)	Maxime Corvez	D	R	23	2024	Grenoble, France
93	(Czech Republic)	Filip Dvořák	C	R	28	2024	Brno, Czech Republic
34	(France)	Raphaël Garnier	G	L	28	2024	Angers, France
11	(Slovenia)	Luka Kalan (A)	C	L	32	2023	Kranj, Slovenia
76	(Finland)	Leevi Karjalainen	D	L	25	2024	Helsinki, Finland
38	(Czech Republic)	Michal Kvasnica	F	L	25	2024	Ostrava, Czech Republic
19	(France)	Jules Lefebvre	D	R	26	2024	Rouen, France
77	(Canada)	Marc-André Lévesque (C)	D	R	35	2023	Longueuil, Quebec, Canada
78	(France)	Teemu Loizeau	W	L	26	2024	Sallanches, France
44	(France)	Julien Msumbu	RW	R	28	2024	Nantes, France
70	(Estonia)	Conrad Mölder	G	L	26	2022	Tallinn, Estonia
25	(France)	Hugo Proux	C	L	24	2024	Cholet, France
94	(Czech Republic)	Adam Raška	C	L	31	2024	Kopřivnice, Czech Republic
22	(France)	Nicolas Ruel (A)	LW	L	29	2024	Saint-Martin-d'Hères, France
29	(France)	Yoan Salve	D	L	25	2023	Rouen, France
96	(Slovakia)	Marek Sloboda	LW	L	28	2024	Bratislava, Slovakia
86	(France)	Alexis Sutor (A)	W	R	26	2018	Nice, France
16	(Finland)	Taavi Tiala (A)	LW	L	32	2024	Lestijärvi, Finland

== Championships ==
- Champion Division 1 - 2016
- Champion Division 2 - 1984 & 2008
- Champion Division 3 - 2004
- Winner Coupe de France Nationale C - 1979
