= Ducs d'Angers =

- City: Angers, France
- League: Ligue Magnus; 1992–present
- Founded: 1982
- Home arena: Angers IceParc
- Colours: Blue, red, white
- Owner: Michael Juret
- General manager: Simon Lacroix
- Head coach: Jonathan Parades
- Captain: Robin Gaborit
- Website: www.lesducsdangers.fr

The Association des Sports de Glisse d'Angers is a French professional ice hockey team based in Angers playing in the Ligue Magnus. The team currently use the name of "Les Ducs d'Angers". The team's mascot is an eagle-owl, or grand duc (literally great duke) in French, but its name is primarily intended as a reference to the prestigious Dukes of Anjou lineage.

The team was founded in 1982 and plays home games at the Angers IceParc.

The team has never been French champion, but won the French cup in 2007 and 2014.

== History ==
=== 2009/2010 ===
Saturday, April 3, 2010 - Angers defeated the Briançon Red Devils on the road, 3 games out of 2, in the Best of 5 game semifinal series. Angers reached the Magnus League Championship for the first time in team history.

Angers and Rouen set to face each other in the Finals. Angers had a chance at redemption after losing at Rouen 7–0 in the Quarterfinals of the French Cup, on Tuesday, January 5, 2010.

Monday, April 6, 2010 - (Game 1 @ Rouen) Angers, on the road, won at Rouen 2–1.

Tuesday, April 7, 2010 - (Game 2 @ Rouen) Angers took a 2–0 lead in the 2nd Period of the game. Rouen started the 3rd Period with a quick goal to bring them within one. Angers quickly responded and scored again, putting themselves up 3–1. And desperation set in for Rouen as they too responded quickly scoring, making it 3-2 Angers. Angers responded several minutes later making it 4–2. Angers never looked back from there. 4–2 final score.

Friday, April 9, 2010 - (Game 3 @ Angers) Les Ducs looked tired and were down 3–0. They battled back and made it 3-2 but would eventually fall 4–2.

Saturday, April 10, 2010 - (Game 4 @ Angers) Angers did not show up to this match and lost their second and final chance to win the cup at home by a 6–1 margin.

Tuesday, April 13, 2010 - (Game 5 @ Rouen) It was 1–1 after two periods of play. Rouen went on to score 3 more in the third period and Angers added one more. The Ducs ended their bid to be champions of France, failing to win it all with their three opportunities to bring the Cup home.

2010 Magnus League Quarterfinals (Best of 5 games)

- Game 1: Tuesday, March 16, 2010 @ Angers Ducs (Angers wins 6-2)
- Game 2: Wednesday, March 17, 2010 @ Angers Ducs (Angers wins 5-0)
- Game 3: Friday, March 19, 2010 @ HC Morzine-Avoriaz Penguins (Angers wins 4-0)

2010 Magnus League Semifinals (Best of 5 games)

- Game 1: Friday, March 26, 2010 @ Briançon Red Devils (Briançon wins 2-1)
- Game 2: Saturday, March 27, 2010 @ Briançon Red Devils (Angers wins 4-2)
- Game 3: Tuesday, March 30, 2010 @ Angers Ducs (Briançon wins 3-2)
- Game 4: Wednesday, March 31, 2010 @ Angers Ducs (Angers wins 3-2)
- Game 5: Saturday, April 3, 2010 @ Briançon Red Devils (Angers wins 4-2)

2010 Magnus League Finals (Best of 5 games)

- Game 1: Tuesday, April 6, 2010 @ Rouen Dragons (Angers wins 2-1)
- Game 2: Wednesday, April 7, 2010 @ Rouen Dragons (Angers wins 4-2)
- Game 3: Friday, April 9, 2010 @ Angers Ducs (Rouen wins 4-2)
- Game 4: Saturday, April 10, 2010 @ Angers Ducs (Rouen wins 6-1)
- Game 5: Tuesday, April 13, 2010 @ Rouen Dragons (Rouen wins 4-2)

=== 2010/2011 ===
The Ducs earned their second consecutive trip to the French Cup Final v. formidable foe Rouen; who ousted the Ducs in the 09-10 Magnus League Championship in three consecutive games. On January 30, 2011, the Ducs would travel to Bercy to face the Dragons. Rouen took an early lead going up 2–0 after 1 period of play. In the 2nd period, Rouen would add two more and Angers adding one. After 2 the score was 4–1. The Ducs mounted a comeback, scoring 3 unanswered goals in the 3rd period; however Angers once again fell victim to the Dragons in overtime, losing 5–4.

== Roster ==
Updated 5 November 2024.

No.	Nat	Player	Pos	S/G	Age	Acquired	Birthplace
78	(Canada)	Ethan Cap	D	L	25	2024	North Vancouver, British Columbia, Canada
22	(Canada)	Jonathan Charbonneau	RW	R	31	2024	Saint-Colomban, Quebec, Canada
70	(Canada)	Parker Colley	C	L	28	2024	Pitt Meadows, British Columbia, Canada
16	(France)	Cédric Di Dio Balsamo	LW	L	31	2019	Briançon, France
94	(France)	Kylian Fauvel	D	L	23	2022	Angers, France
11	(France)	Robin Gaborit (C)	RW	R	35	2012	Cholet, France
13	(France)	Virgile Gauffriau	C	R	20	2024	Nantes, France
71	(Canada)	Philippe Halley	C	L	33	2020	Quebec City, Quebec
37	(France)	Elliot Lévêque	G	L	22	2024	Cholet, France
17	(France)	Vincent Llorca (A)	D	R	34	2019	Clermont-Ferrand, France
8	(Canada)	Neil Manning	D	L	34	2019	Nanaimo, British Columbia, Canada
29	(Canada)	Matt O'Connor	G	L	34	2024	Toronto, Ontario, Canada
5	(France)	Lucien Onno	D	R	26	2024	Paris, France
55	(France)	Maxime Orlov	F	L	22	2023	Belfort, France
7	(Canada)	Matt Prapavessis	D	R	34	2022	Oakville, Ontario, Canada
10	(France)	Nicolas Ritz (A)	C	L	33	2020	Dijon, France
50	(Finland)	Jere Rouhiainen	D	L	30	2024	Tampere, Finland
72	(France)	Téo Sarliève	W	R	26	2020	Clermont-Ferrand, France
14	(France)	Marius Serer	F	L	32	2018	Amiens, France
4	(Canada)	Brady Shaw	RW	L	33	2023	Ottawa, Ontario, Canada
74	(France)	Thomas Suire	RW	L	27	2024	Evian-les-Bains, France
25	(Finland)	Sami Tavernier	RW	R	28	2024	Annemasse, France
12	(France)	Peter Valier	RW	R	33	2023	Pontoise, France
91	(Canada)	Matt Wilkins	LW	L	35	2024	Kimberley, British Columbia, Canada

== Notable former players ==
- Julien Albert
- Miguel Baldris
- Tomas Baluch
- Christophe Blanchet
- Claude Deveze
- Andrew Finlay
- François Ferrari
- Stephane Gachet
- Rodolphe Garnier
- François Gravel
- Florian Hardy
- Michael Irani
- Jean-Francois Jodoin
- Henrik Johansson
- Alexandre Kalisa
- Marko Kiprusoff (brother of NHL goaltender Miikka Kiprusoff)
- Martin Lacroix
- Simon Lacroix
- Todd Marcellus
- Juan-Jose Palacin
- Guillaume Rodrigue
- Joakim Skold
- Anders Sörensen
- Jeremy Tabb (University of Massachusetts Lowell/Elmira College)
- Alain Vogin
