= Patinoire Iceberg =

Ice hockey rink in Strasbourg, France

- l'Iceberg
- Interactive map of Patinoire Iceberg
- Location: Rue Pierre Nuss; 67200 Strasbourg
- Coordinates: 48°35′23″N 7°43′34″E
- Capacity: Hockey: 1,200; Up to 2,400 for other events.

Construction
- Opened: 2005

Tenant
- Étoile Noire de Strasbourg (2005-present)

The Patinoire Iceberg (also called l'Iceberg; in English: Iceberg ice rink) is an ice hockey rink located in Strasbourg, France. The Ligue Magnus ice hockey team, the Étoile Noire de Strasbourg play their home games here.

== Description ==
The iceberg was opened in December 2005, and has two rinks. The competition rink features 1,200 seats, which can be expanded to 2,400 seats for some events. The recreational rink offers a surface of 500 square metres (5,400 ft^{2}) for public use.
