= Mitja Šivic =

Slovenian ice hockey player

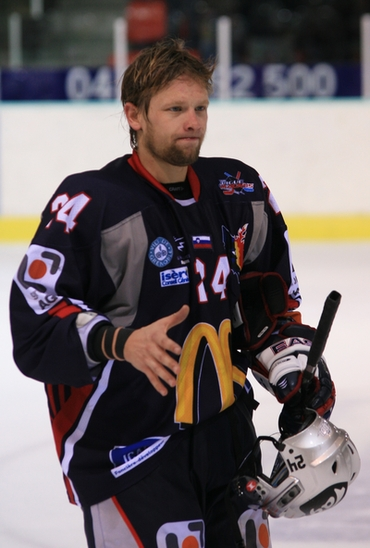
- Born: October 1, 1979 (age 46) Brezje, SFR Yugoslavia
- Height: 5 ft 10 in (178 cm)
- Weight: 187 lb (85 kg; 13 st 5 lb)
- Position: Forward
- Shot: Left
- Played for: Olimpija Ljubljana; HK Bled; Keramin Minsk; Diables Rouges de Briançon; Brûleurs de Loups; LHC Les Lions
- National team: Slovenia
- NHL draft: Undrafted
- Playing career: 1999–2016

Mitja Šivic (born October 1, 1979) is a Slovenian ice hockey player. He participated at the 2011 IIHF World Championship as a member of the Slovenia men's national ice hockey team.
