= Pionniers de Chamonix Mont-Blanc =

- Nickname: Pionniers
- City: Chamonix
- League: Ligue Magnus; 2016–Present
- Founded: 2016
- Home arena: Richard Bozon Ice Rink
- Colours
- General manager: Christophe Ville
- Head coach: Anatoli Bogdanov
- Captain: Clément Masson
- Website: Les Pionniers

The Pionniers de Chamonix Mont-Blanc (French for 'Chamonix Mont-Blanc Pioneers') are a French ice hockey team based in Chamonix, Haute-Savoie. They play in the country's top tier, the Ligue Magnus. For their inaugural 2016–17 season, they were known as Pionniers de Chamonix-Morzine.

== History ==
=== Origins ===
In 2016, France's Ligue Magnus adopted an expanded schedule and cut its number of teams from 14 to 12. The league's two Haute-Savoie clubs, the Chamois de Chamonix and the Pingouins de Morzine-Avoriaz, decided to merge their respective professional teams in order to better face the economic and competitive challenges presented by the new setup. The result of that fusion was a joint team called the Pionniers, splitting its home games between Chamonix and Morzine-Avoriaz. The amateur sections remained separate and retained the Chamois and Pingouins names.

While both towns are located within the same department, they are not particularly close, with Chamonix nested in the Mont Blanc massif and Morzine-Avoriaz part of the Chablais region. Following negotiations between the two municipalities, it was agreed that Chamonix would be the united team's training base for its inaugural season, as well as the owner of its league franchise.

=== 2016-17 season ===
2016–17 Chamonix-Morzine logo

The precarious balance between the two organizations was quickly challenged when the new Pionniers limped out of the gate to a dismal record. Mid-February 2017, head coach Stéphane Gros was dismissed as the team was dead last in the standings. The move was not unexpected from a sporting standpoint, but it further aggravated the Morzine-Avoriaz side as Gros had career ties to both clubs, while his replacement Christophe Ville was viewed as purely a Chamonix man. The Pioneers still finished the season in last place and Morzine-Avoriaz renounced the partnership after a single season.

=== Aftermath ===
As the fusion agreement was more protective of Chamonix's interests, Morzine-Avoriaz suffered the most damaging fallout. Chamonix kept the organization's trademarks and visual identity, and most importantly its position in the French hockey rankings. While their twelfth-place finish should have sent them to the lower division, they ended up being saved from relegation by the withdrawal of Dijon from the Ligue Magnus.
Morzine-Avoriaz on the other hand returned to its previous identity, the Penguins, and had to start all over at the country's fourth level, the Division 3, in 2017–18.

== Current roster ==
Updated 9 November 2024.

No.	Nat	Player	Pos	S/G	Age	Acquired	Birthplace
31	(France)	Tom Aubrun	G	L	30	2023	Chamonix, France
28	(Sweden)	Nils Carnbäck	C	L	28	2024	Gothenburg, Sweden
54	(France)	Valentin Coffy	D	R	25	2020	Thonon-les-Bains, France
15	(France)	Lauric Convert	RW	R	26	2020	Grenoble, France
42	(France)	Alexis Dogémont	D	R	22	2023	Nantes, France
46	(France)	Camil Durand	D	R	30	2020	Chamonix, France
27	(Canada)	Jérémy Fortin	C	L	26	2024	Dolbeau-Mistassini, Quebec, Canada
9	(Latvia)	Ričards Grīnbergs	W	L	25	2024	Valmiera, Latvia
39	(Czech Republic)	Jakub Ižacký	LW	L	32	2024	Třinec, Czech Republic
91	(Finland)	Saku Kivinen	C	L	30	2024	Vantaa, Finland
96	(Belarus)	Stanislav Lopachuk	LW	L	33	2023	Minsk, Belarus
3	(France)	Clément Masson (C)	C	R	39	2020	Paris, France
17	(France)	Jordan Mugnier	F	L	29	2024	Chamonix, France
29	(France)	Lucas Mugnier	G	L	26	2023	Chamonix, France
49	(Czech Republic)	Jakub Müller	D	R	26	2022	Slaný, Czech Republic
25	(France)	Jérémie Penz	D	L	26	2023	Sallanches, France
77	(France)	Bryan Ten Braak	LW	L	35	2024	Dammarie-les-Lys, France
72	(Canada)	Tristan Thompson	D	L	29	2024	Canmore, Alberta, Canada
19	(Canada)	Matt Tugnutt	LW	L	29	2024	Portland, Maine, United States
41	(France)	Gabin Ville	RW	L	28	2024	Chamonix, France
21	(France)	Malo Ville (A)	C	L	30	2019	Chamonix, France
11	(Sweden)	Jesper Åkerman	D	L	26	2024	Stockholm, Sweden
