= Patinoire René Froger =

Indoor sporting arena in Briançon, France

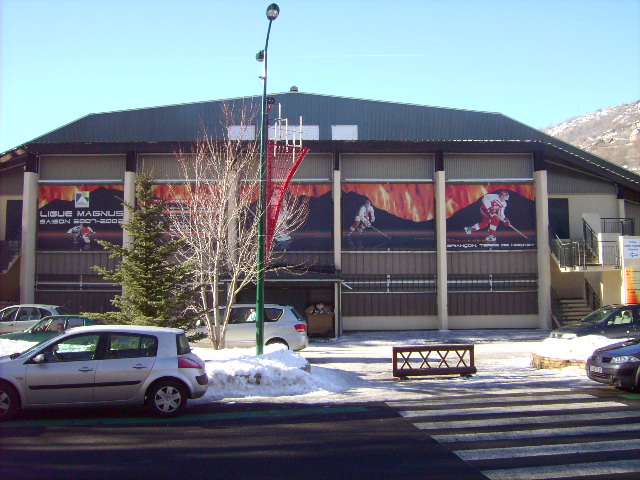
- Interactive map of Patinoire René Froger
- Location: 37, rue G. Bermond-Gonnet – Parc des Sports; 05 100 Briançon France
- Coordinates: 44°53′22″N 6°37′45″E
- Owner: Briançon
- Capacity: Hockey : 2,150
- Surface: One surface

Construction
- Opened: 1968; 58 years ago

Tenant
- Diables Rouges de Briançon (Ligue Magnus)

The Patinoire René Froger is an indoor sporting arena located in the Parc des Sports in Briançon, France. The capacity of the arena is 2,150 people and was built in 1968. It is currently home to the Diables Rouges de Briançon ice hockey team.

The arena was used for the 2004 World Junior Ice Hockey Championships Division I Group B.

== René Froger ==
The name of René Froger was given to the ice rink in September 1994, the 6th. René Froger was a former player and president of the Diables Rouges de Briançon ice hockey team. He died in deportation during the World War II in Gusen concentration camp.
