= Boxers de Bordeaux =

- City: Bordeaux, France
- League: Ligue Magnus; 2015–present
- Founded: 1998
- Home arena: Patinoire de Mériadeck
- Colors
- Owners: Thierry Parienty
- President: Thierry Parienty
- General manager: Stéphan Tartari
- Head coach: Olivier Dimet
- Captain: Kévin Dusseau
- Website: www.hockey-boxers-de-bordeaux.fr

Franchise history
- 1998–present: Boxers de Bordeaux

The Boxers de Bordeaux are a professional ice hockey team founded in 1998 and based in Bordeaux, Gironde, France. Since 2015, they have been playing at the highest level of the French hockey pyramid, the Ligue Magnus. A group of Canadian investors, which includes famed player and coach Patrick Roy, owns a minority stake in the team.

== History ==
=== Founding and lower divisions (1998–2015) ===
The organization was established in October 1998 under the legal name Bordeaux Gironde Hockey 2000 to succeed a recently folded team known during most of its history as the Dogues de Bordeaux. Like its predecessor, the club named itself after a mastiff breed, the Boxer. A few players from the Dogues opted to remain with the new team despite starting all the way back to the fourth tier. Among them was league veteran Stéphan Tartari, who would double as a player and assistant coach. He would graduate to the position of head coach, and later manager after the end of playing career.

The Boxers immediately ascended to the third tier, and further gained promotion to the second tier in 2006, where it would remain for ten years. In 2014, the parent club spun off the men's team to a separate for-profit company to prepare for promotion to the country's highest level, the Ligue Magnus. Thierry Parienty, managing director of battery store franchise Voltéo and former regional executive at Coca-Cola, came onboard as the team's majority shareholder at that time. The team reached second-tier finals in 2014 and 2015, losing to Lyon in the former before defeating southwest rivals Anglet—then coached by future Bordeaux skipper Olivier Dimet—thanks to a sudden death goal by Anglet-trained Thomas Decock in game four of the best-of-five series. With the win, the city of Bordeaux returned to the national top flight after a 17-year absence.

=== Ligue Magnus (2015–present) ===
==== Underdog years ====
Following an undistinguished first season, where it finished in 9th place and narrowly missed the playoffs, the team reached 4th place and the playoff semifinals in 2016–17 and 2017–18, equaling the historical best of the market's previous team, the Dogues. The 2018–19 campaign however, was both a sporting and financial disappointment, as the club was prematurely eliminated by Amiens in the quarterfinals, and assessed the first of two consecutive point penalties for overspending. As a result, the club had to par down its roster for several seasons to replenish its coffers. Following the rebuild, the club returned to its status as a solid underdog in the Ligue Magnus behind the league's perennial big three of Rouen, Grenoble and Angers, with the city of Bordeaux considered perhaps the country's most hockey-friendly major agglomeration thanks to its affluent demographics.

==== Breakthrough and arrival of Canadian investors ====
In January 2024, it was announced that a partnership of former NHL great Patrick Roy and fellow Canadians Jean Bédard, owner of sports bar chain La Cage, and Jacques Tanguay, former owner of the Quebec Remparts, had acquired a minority stake in the team. The trio's shares represent an 18.5 percent ownership.

Although the early stretch of their 2023–24 season was hampered by injuries, the Boxers righted the ship to enter the playoffs with the fourth seed. They beat newcomers Marseille in the overtime of game seven, before upsetting the country's biggest-budget team Grenoble in a five-game semifinal to reach their first title series. The team won the first two games on the ice of title defenders Rouen, but lost the next four to finish the campaign as runner-up, its best result to date. In the 2026 playoffs, the Boxers beat emerging rivals Marseille four games to one in the opening round, before sweeping Rouen in the semifinals to clinch their second championship appearance.

== Honors ==
=== Champions ===
(gold) Ligue Magnus (1): 2025–26
(gold) Division 1 (1): 2014–15

=== Runners-up ===
(silver) Ligue Magnus (1): 2023–24
(silver) Division 1 (1): 2013–14

== Retired numbers ==
Boxers de Bordeaux retired numbers
No	Player	Position	Career	Last match date for Boxers	Date No. retired
4	Stéphan Tartari	C	1998–2008; 1996–98 w/ Dogues de Bordeaux	April 12, 2008	January 29, 2019

== Notable personnel ==
- François Bouchard
- Jean-Philippe Côté
- Tanner Glass
- Ņikita Jevpalovs
- Maxime Sauvé
