= Scorpions de Mulhouse =

- Nickname: Scorpions
- City: Mulhouse, France
- League: FFHG Division 3
- Founded: 2007
- Home arena: Patinoire de l'Illberg
- Colours
- General manager: Julien Aubry
- Head coach: Michaël Muller
- Captain: Michaël Marchand
- Website: Scorpions de Mulhouse

Franchise history
- Association our le développement du hockey mulhousien

The Scorpions de Mulhouse is a French ice hockey team, based in Mulhouse, France, run by the Association pour le développement du hockey mulhousien (ADHM) (English: Mulhousian Association for the development of hockey). They currently play in the FFHG Division 3, the fourth highest level of French ice hockey. They previously participated in the Ligue Magnus, the highest level.

== Roster ==
Updated May 26, 2025.

Number		Player	Position
3	(Canada)	Michael-Anthony Deslauriers Châtelain	D
4	(Sweden)	Linus Kaistila	D
6	(France)	Quentin Mathez	F
7	(France)	Thomas-Alexandre Ackermann	F
8	(France)	Aurélien Klesmann	D
9	(France)	Vincent Da Silva (A)	F
11	(France)	Laurent Gerber	F
17	(France)	Julien Burgert	F/D
18	(France)	Guillaume Huck	D
19	(France)	Valentin Poulain	D
20	(France)	Kylian Dufour	F/D
21	(France)	Joachim Sonnet (A)	D
28	(France)	Sabri Nakhli	F
31	(France)	Lukas Paicheler	G
33	(Spain)	Diego Zorita	D
60	(Sweden)	Nicolas Jona	G
67	(France)	Tom Muller	F
71	(France)	Téo Haffner	F
77	(France)	Noah Oswald	F
81	(France)	Mathis Guth	D
89	(France)	Michaël Marchand (C)	F
96	(France)	Quentin Chauvel	F
	(France)	Hugo Filippig	D
	(France)	Arnaud Fuss	F
	(France)	Matthieu Le Blond	F
	(France)	Julien Wurth	F
