= Pôle sportif et culturel Chamonix Nord =

Ensemble of facilities in Chamonix, France

- Interactive map of Pôle sportif et culturel Chamonix Nord
- Address: Route du Bouchet
- Location: Chamonix, France
- Coordinates: 45°55′39″N 6°52′24.9″E
- Public transit: Centre sportif

Construction
- Built: 1970–75
- Years active: 1971–present

Pôle sportif et culturel Chamonix Nord (English: North Chamonix Sports and Culture Hub) is an ensemble of educational and sports facilities located in the northern part of Chamonix, Haute-Savoie, France. The project was the brainchild of Chamonix's mayor, former minister and mountaineer Maurice Herzog, and architect Roger Taillibert, with engineering support from Heinz Isler.

It is aesthetically significant for introducing the use of domed skylights to Taillibert's work, which he would revisit on a larger scale with Montréal's Olympic Park and Abu Dhabi's Armed Forces Officers Club and Hotel. While well received within the architectural community, its stark departure from Alpine tradition was divisive among the general public. Newspaper Le Monde attributed Herzog's loss in the 1977 mayoral election to the local population's disdain for Taillibert's style, which he had championed.

Centre sportif Richard-Bozon (English: Richard Bozon Sports Center) is the name collectively given to north Chamonix's sports facilities. The name broadly applies to the sports buildings within the Taillibert ensemble, and other nearby infrastructures to which he didn't contribute. It was adopted following the 1995 death of veteran mountain guide Richard Bozon in an avalanche.

== Taillibert ensemble ==
Taillibert's buildings form an intricate structure, which at its peak consisted of twenty-eight triangular concrete arches, many of them imbricated into others and sharing common bearing points. They are divided into two sections: the south section for cultural and educational activities (originally nineteen arches, four of which were later phased out), and the north section for sports facilities (nine arches). Some facilities spread across multiple arches. It was originally intended as a single, undivided student-athlete complex, with a network of galleries connecting the educational and sports facilities. Ultimately, a change of government majority lead to that aspect of the project being abandoned, although the north and south sections retain an identical architectural style. In addition to the arches, a midrise building and three towers were built for the housing of some of the staff and students. The towers were singled out for particular criticism due to their near brutalist architecture.

=== Cultural buildings ===
- Cité scolaire Roger-Frison-Roche (English: Roger Frison-Roche Comprehensive School) encompasses a junior high school, a high school, and two towers serving as student residences. Classes opened in 1972, while the towers were completed in 1975. Circa 2007, four of the school's smaller arches were demolished and replaced with a single larger, horizontally curved building in order to increase its capacity. In 2016, the institution was formally renamed after writer and explorer Roger Frison-Roche, although the school had used the name for years.
- École nationale de ski et d'alpinisme (English: National Ski and Mountaineering School), abbreviated ENSA, is one of the two divisions of the École nationale des sports de montagne (English: National Mountain Sports School). It oversees the training of high altitude mountain sports professionals, such as alpine skiing, climbing and paragliding instructors. The school offers a special library, an amphitheatre that hosts both student lectures and public conferences on mountain-related topics, as well as a third tower for the accommodation of its own students. The ENSA moved from the downtown Hôtel des Allobroges to the Chamonix Nord complex in 1975.
- Résidence CES–CET–ENSA, built around the same time as the student towers for the staffs of both comprehensive school and ENSA, and located across the road from the latter. Today it is not reserved for public servants anymore.
- Espace Michel-Croz, abbreviated EMC2, a live theater opened in late 2021 in a space previously occupied by a nursery and Chamonix's culinary school. It is named in remembrance of the original Salle Michel-Croz, the city's historic downtown ballroom, which burned down in 1999.
- Médiathèque de Chamonix, the central location of the Chamonix Valley Mediatheques and Libraries Network, a network of six public establishments. Delivered in 1973.
- La Coupole (English: The Dome), a community center offering various social outreach programs and office space for local associations. Delivered in 1974.

=== Sports buildings ===
- An aquatic center, opened in 1971. The outdoor section features a six-lane, 50 metre pool with stands. A diving pool and five-meter platform were part of the original design, but were replaced with a 141 m^{2} Jacuzzi and a 17-metre water slide in 2009. The indoor section consists of a five-lane, 25 metre pool, a play pool, and a sauna/hammam. A 130-metre toboggan was added in the 1980s. It extends out of the building but is fully enclosed for use during the winter season.
- An indoor sports center, consisting of a competition hall with a 44 × 22 metre playground and 500 seats for various team sports, a training hall, a dojo, a dance studio, an exercise room and an entry-level climbing room. Completed in 1973.

== Other facilities ==
=== Ice sports ===
- The Patinoire Richard-Bozon (English: Richard Bozon Ice Rink) predates Taillibert's work, and opened in 1962. It is the home ice for the Chamonix Mont-Blanc Pionniers men's professional team, the Chamonix Rebelles senior women's team and the Chamonix Hockey Club minor hockey association. It hosted the 1986 World Short Track Speed Skating Championships.
- A 333-metre natural outdoor speed skating track (French: anneau de glace) was approved for construction in 1982 and built over the following years. It hosted the 1993 French Allround Speed Skating Championships. Its location is close to that of the now dismantled Stade du Mont-Blanc, which hosted the 1924 Winter Olympics, however it is a different and greatly scaled down facility. In the summer, it is a six-lane running track with a jumping pit, while the central area can be used as two handball courts or four basketball courts.

=== Other sports ===
- A dedicated ENSA Gymmasium was approved for construction in 1988, and built over the following years to the east of the ice rink. It houses a 4000-hold climbing installation. As a dependency of the ENSA, it is technically not part of Centre sportif Richard-Bozon. However the Club des Sports de Chamonix, the city's historic multisports association, rents the gymnasium part-time and makes it available to its general audience membership at select hours.
- The Chamonix Tennis Club opened in 1964 and was expanded throughout the years. Taillibert made minor contributions to the arrangement of a second batch of outdoor courts, which were built concurrently with his nearby sports center in 1972, but the tennis club's indoor building was only built in 1986. It was expanded from two to four courts in 2019. The club's indoor courts and eight of the eleven outdoor courts are made of clay. Two indoor squash courts are also available.
- A 800 m^{2} BMX and skate park was added to the northeastern end of the complex in 2012.
