= 2017 IIHF World Championship rosters =

Each team's roster consisted of at least 15 skaters (forwards and defencemen) and two goaltenders, and at most 22 skaters and three goaltenders. All 16 participating nations, through the confirmation of their respective national associations, had to submit a roster by the first IIHF directorate meeting.

Age and team as of 5 May 2017.

== Group A ==
=== Denmark ===
A 24-player roster was announced on 24 March 2017. The roster was 27 on 18 April 2017. On 25 April 2017, it was reduced to 24 players.

Head coach: Janne Karlsson

No.	Pos.	Name	Height	Weight	Birthdate	Team
2	D	Phillip Bruggisser	1.83 m (6 ft 0 in)	85 kg (187 lb)	August 7, 1991 (aged 25)	(Denmark) Esbjerg Energy
8	D	Nicolai Weichel	1.85 m (6 ft 1 in)	90 kg (200 lb)	November 6, 1997 (aged 19)	(Denmark) Rungsted Seier Capital
9	F	Frederik Storm	1.80 m (5 ft 11 in)	86 kg (190 lb)	February 20, 1989 (aged 28)	(Sweden) Malmö Redhawks
12	F	Mads Christensen	1.79 m (5 ft 10 in)	80 kg (180 lb)	April 2, 1987 (aged 30)	(Germany) EHC Red Bull München
13	F	Morten Green – C	1.83 m (6 ft 0 in)	88 kg (194 lb)	March 19, 1981 (aged 36)	(Denmark) Rungsted Seier Capital
19	F	Steffen Klarskov	1.78 m (5 ft 10 in)	83 kg (183 lb)	March 12, 1991 (aged 26)	(Denmark) Rødovre Mighty Bulls
22	D	Markus Lauridsen	1.88 m (6 ft 2 in)	89 kg (196 lb)	February 28, 1991 (aged 26)	(Sweden) Leksands IF
24	F	Nikolaj Ehlers	1.85 m (6 ft 1 in)	82 kg (181 lb)	February 14, 1996 (aged 21)	(Canada) Winnipeg Jets
25	D	Oliver Lauridsen	1.97 m (6 ft 6 in)	104 kg (229 lb)	March 24, 1989 (aged 28)	(Finland) Jokerit
28	D	Emil Kristensen	1.84 m (6 ft 0 in)	84 kg (185 lb)	September 20, 1992 (aged 24)	(Sweden) Linköpings HC
29	F	Morten Madsen – A	1.90 m (6 ft 3 in)	95 kg (209 lb)	January 16, 1987 (aged 30)	(Sweden) Karlskrona HK
31	G	Simon Nielsen	1.88 m (6 ft 2 in)	80 kg (180 lb)	October 27, 1986 (aged 30)	(Denmark) Herning Blue Fox
32	G	Sebastian Dahm	1.86 m (6 ft 1 in)	82 kg (181 lb)	February 28, 1987 (aged 30)	(Austria) Graz 99ers
33	F	Julian Jakobsen	1.84 m (6 ft 0 in)	87 kg (192 lb)	April 11, 1987 (aged 30)	(Denmark) Aalborg Pirates
36	D	Matias Lassen	1.82 m (6 ft 0 in)	82 kg (181 lb)	March 15, 1996 (aged 21)	(Sweden) Mora IK
38	F	Morten Poulsen	1.84 m (6 ft 0 in)	84 kg (185 lb)	September 9, 1988 (aged 28)	(Finland) Lahti Pelicans
39	G	Georg Sørensen	1.76 m (5 ft 9 in)	75 kg (165 lb)	May 15, 1995 (aged 21)	(Sweden) Almtuna IS
41	D	Jesper Jensen	1.83 m (6 ft 0 in)	86 kg (190 lb)	July 30, 1991 (aged 25)	(Finland) Jokerit
42	F	Mikkel Aagaard	1.84 m (6 ft 0 in)	81 kg (179 lb)	October 18, 1995 (aged 21)	(United States) Stockton Heat
43	F	Nichlas Hardt	1.77 m (5 ft 10 in)	80 kg (180 lb)	July 6, 1988 (aged 28)	(Sweden) Malmö Redhawks
48	D	Nicholas Jensen	1.89 m (6 ft 2 in)	90 kg (200 lb)	April 8, 1989 (aged 28)	(Denmark) Rungsted Seier Capital
50	F	Mathias Bau Hansen	2.00 m (6 ft 7 in)	108 kg (238 lb)	July 3, 1993 (aged 23)	(Denmark) Frederikshavn White Hawks
60	F	Patrick Russell	1.86 m (6 ft 1 in)	93 kg (205 lb)	January 4, 1993 (aged 24)	(United States) Bakersfield Condors
72	F	Nicolai Meyer	1.83 m (6 ft 0 in)	82 kg (181 lb)	July 21, 1993 (aged 23)	(Sweden) Tingsryds AIF
93	F	Peter Regin – A	1.87 m (6 ft 2 in)	90 kg (200 lb)	April 16, 1986 (aged 31)	(Finland) Jokerit

=== Germany ===
A 26-player roster was announced on 17 April 2017. The roster was renewed to 27 players on 26 April 2017. The final squad was revealed on 2 May 2017.

Head coach: Marco Sturm

Number	Position	Name	Height	Weight	Birthdate	Team
1	G	Thomas Greiss	1.86 m (6 ft 1 in)	98 kg (216 lb)	January 29, 1986 (aged 31)	(United States) New York Islanders
2	D	Denis Reul	1.93 m (6 ft 4 in)	110 kg (240 lb)	June 29, 1989 (aged 27)	(Germany) Adler Mannheim
3	D	Justin Krueger	1.90 m (6 ft 3 in)	100 kg (220 lb)	October 6, 1986 (aged 30)	(Switzerland) SC Bern
8	F	Tobias Rieder	1.80 m (5 ft 11 in)	82 kg (181 lb)	January 10, 1993 (aged 24)	(United States) Arizona Coyotes
10	D	Christian Ehrhoff – C	1.88 m (6 ft 2 in)	92 kg (203 lb)	July 6, 1982 (aged 34)	(Germany) Kölner Haie
12	F	Brooks Macek	1.81 m (5 ft 11 in)	82 kg (181 lb)	May 15, 1992 (aged 24)	(Germany) EHC Red Bull München
16	D	Konrad Abeltshauser	1.95 m (6 ft 5 in)	96 kg (212 lb)	September 2, 1992 (aged 24)	(Germany) EHC Red Bull München
17	F	Marcus Kink – A	1.86 m (6 ft 1 in)	96 kg (212 lb)	January 13, 1985 (aged 32)	(Germany) Adler Mannheim
22	F	Matthias Plachta	1.88 m (6 ft 2 in)	100 kg (220 lb)	May 16, 1991 (aged 25)	(Germany) Adler Mannheim
24	D	Dennis Seidenberg – A	1.86 m (6 ft 1 in)	95 kg (209 lb)	July 18, 1981 (aged 35)	(United States) New York Islanders
29	F	Leon Draisaitl	1.89 m (6 ft 2 in)	96 kg (212 lb)	October 21, 1995 (aged 21)	(Canada) Edmonton Oilers
30	G	Philipp Grubauer	1.85 m (6 ft 1 in)	84 kg (185 lb)	November 25, 1991 (aged 25)	(United States) Washington Capitals
33	G	Danny aus den Birken	1.86 m (6 ft 1 in)	89 kg (196 lb)	February 15, 1985 (aged 32)	(Germany) EHC Red Bull München
36	F	Yannic Seidenberg	1.72 m (5 ft 8 in)	82 kg (181 lb)	January 11, 1984 (aged 33)	(Germany) EHC Red Bull München
37	F	Patrick Reimer	1.79 m (5 ft 10 in)	86 kg (190 lb)	October 16, 1982 (aged 34)	(Germany) Thomas Sabo Ice Tigers
42	F	Yasin Ehliz	1.77 m (5 ft 10 in)	84 kg (185 lb)	December 30, 1992 (aged 24)	(Germany) Thomas Sabo Ice Tigers
43	F	Gerrit Fauser	1.82 m (6 ft 0 in)	89 kg (196 lb)	July 13, 1989 (aged 27)	(Germany) EHC Wolfsburg
48	D	Frank Hördler	1.83 m (6 ft 0 in)	90 kg (200 lb)	January 26, 1985 (aged 32)	(Germany) Eisbären Berlin
50	F	Patrick Hager	1.78 m (5 ft 10 in)	82 kg (181 lb)	September 8, 1988 (aged 28)	(Germany) Kölner Haie
55	F	Felix Schütz	1.80 m (5 ft 11 in)	89 kg (196 lb)	November 3, 1987 (aged 29)	(Sweden) Rögle BK
72	F	Dominik Kahun	1.80 m (5 ft 11 in)	80 kg (180 lb)	July 2, 1995 (aged 21)	(Germany) EHC Red Bull München
87	F	Philip Gogulla	1.88 m (6 ft 2 in)	88 kg (194 lb)	July 31, 1987 (aged 29)	(Germany) Kölner Haie
89	F	David Wolf	1.91 m (6 ft 3 in)	99 kg (218 lb)	September 15, 1989 (aged 27)	(Germany) Adler Mannheim
91	D	Moritz Müller	1.87 m (6 ft 2 in)	92 kg (203 lb)	November 19, 1986 (aged 30)	(Germany) Kölner Haie
95	F	Frederik Tiffels	1.85 m (6 ft 1 in)	91 kg (201 lb)	May 20, 1995 (aged 21)	(United States) Western Michigan Univ.

=== Italy ===
A 25-player roster was announced on 6 April 2017. A renewed 27-player roster was revealed on 24 April 2017. The final roster was set on 30 April 2017.

Head coach: Stefan Mair

No.	Pos.	Name	Height	Weight	Birthdate	Team
1	G	Andreas Bernard	1.83 m (6 ft 0 in)	80 kg (180 lb)	June 9, 1990 (aged 26)	(Finland) Ässät
8	F	Marco Insam	1.88 m (6 ft 2 in)	92 kg (203 lb)	June 5, 1989 (aged 27)	(Italy) HCB South Tyrol
9	D	Armin Hofer	1.84 m (6 ft 0 in)	90 kg (200 lb)	March 19, 1987 (aged 30)	(Italy) HC Pustertal Wölfe
10	F	Giulio Scandella	1.86 m (6 ft 1 in)	83 kg (183 lb)	September 18, 1983 (aged 33)	(Italy) Asiago Hockey 1935
15	D	Enrico Miglioranzi	1.83 m (6 ft 0 in)	86 kg (190 lb)	October 8, 1991 (aged 25)	(Italy) Asiago Hockey 1935
16	F	Giovanni Morini	1.87 m (6 ft 2 in)	90 kg (200 lb)	February 2, 1995 (aged 22)	(Switzerland) HC Lugano
17	D	Alexander Egger	1.86 m (6 ft 1 in)	89 kg (196 lb)	December 22, 1979 (aged 37)	(Italy) HCB South Tyrol
18	F	Anton Bernard – C	1.78 m (5 ft 10 in)	82 kg (181 lb)	April 18, 1989 (aged 28)	(Italy) HCB South Tyrol
19	F	Raphael Andergassen	1.77 m (5 ft 10 in)	73 kg (161 lb)	June 16, 1993 (aged 23)	(Italy) HC Pustertal Wölfe
21	F	Luca Frigo	1.83 m (6 ft 0 in)	90 kg (200 lb)	May 30, 1993 (aged 23)	(Italy) HCB South Tyrol
22	F	Diego Kostner – A	1.83 m (6 ft 0 in)	82 kg (181 lb)	August 5, 1992 (aged 24)	(Switzerland) HC Ambrì-Piotta
23	F	Simon Kostner	1.72 m (5 ft 8 in)	77 kg (170 lb)	November 30, 1990 (aged 26)	(Italy) Ritten Sport
25	D	Stefano Marchetti	1.81 m (5 ft 11 in)	83 kg (183 lb)	November 10, 1986 (aged 30)	(Italy) Asiago Hockey 1935
26	D	Armin Helfer – A	1.86 m (6 ft 1 in)	97 kg (214 lb)	May 31, 1980 (aged 36)	(Italy) HC Pustertal Wölfe
27	D	Thomas Larkin	1.96 m (6 ft 5 in)	100 kg (220 lb)	December 31, 1990 (aged 26)	(Germany) Adler Mannheim
28	D	Daniel Glira	1.88 m (6 ft 2 in)	87 kg (192 lb)	March 25, 1994 (aged 23)	(Italy) HCB South Tyrol
29	G	Frederic Cloutier	1.83 m (6 ft 0 in)	83 kg (183 lb)	May 14, 1981 (aged 35)	(Italy) Asiago Hockey 1935
35	G	Gianluca Vallini	1.82 m (6 ft 0 in)	78 kg (172 lb)	October 27, 1993 (aged 23)	(Italy) HC Gherdëina
55	D	Luca Zanatta	1.85 m (6 ft 1 in)	90 kg (200 lb)	May 15, 1991 (aged 25)	(Switzerland) HC Red Ice
57	F	Markus Gander	1.88 m (6 ft 2 in)	90 kg (200 lb)	May 16, 1989 (aged 27)	(Italy) HCB South Tyrol
58	F	Tommaso Goi	1.80 m (5 ft 11 in)	76 kg (168 lb)	January 8, 1990 (aged 27)	(Switzerland) HCB Ticino Rockets
63	F	Alex Lambacher	1.91 m (6 ft 3 in)	90 kg (200 lb)	October 7, 1996 (aged 20)	(Germany) EC Kassel Huskies
68	F	Michele Marchetti	1.85 m (6 ft 1 in)	83 kg (183 lb)	September 27, 1994 (aged 22)	(Italy) HCB South Tyrol
71	F	Daniel Frank	1.87 m (6 ft 2 in)	90 kg (200 lb)	March 21, 1994 (aged 23)	(Italy) HCB South Tyrol
90	F	Tommaso Traversa	1.71 m (5 ft 7 in)	77 kg (170 lb)	August 4, 1990 (aged 26)	(Italy) Ritten Sport

=== Latvia ===
A 22-player roster was announced on 15 April 2017. On 22 April 2017, it was renewed. A 28-player roster was announced on 27 April 2017. The final roster was revealed on 2 May 2017.

Head coach: Bob Hartley

No.	Pos.	Name	Height	Weight	Birthdate	Team
4	D	Kristofers Bindulis	1.90 m (6 ft 3 in)	86 kg (190 lb)	September 17, 1995 (aged 21)	(United States) Lake Superior State Lakers
5	F	Jānis Sprukts – A	1.90 m (6 ft 3 in)	102 kg (225 lb)	January 31, 1982 (aged 35)	(Italy) Ritten Sport
11	D	Kristaps Sotnieks	1.83 m (6 ft 0 in)	93 kg (205 lb)	January 29, 1987 (aged 30)	(Russia) HC Lada Togliatti
13	F	Gunārs Skvorcovs	1.87 m (6 ft 2 in)	97 kg (214 lb)	January 13, 1990 (aged 27)	(Latvia) Dinamo Riga
14	F	Rihards Bukarts	1.79 m (5 ft 10 in)	84 kg (185 lb)	December 31, 1995 (aged 21)	(United States) Springfield Thunderbirds
16	F	Kaspars Daugaviņš – C	1.83 m (6 ft 0 in)	97 kg (214 lb)	May 18, 1988 (aged 28)	(Russia) Torpedo Nizhny Novgorod
23	F	Teodors Bļugers	1.86 m (6 ft 1 in)	84 kg (185 lb)	August 15, 1994 (aged 22)	(United States) Wilkes-Barre/Scranton Penguins
25	F	Andris Džeriņš	1.85 m (6 ft 1 in)	85 kg (187 lb)	February 14, 1988 (aged 29)	(Czech Republic) Mountfield HK
26	D	Uvis Balinskis	1.79 m (5 ft 10 in)	76 kg (168 lb)	August 1, 1996 (aged 20)	(Latvia) Dinamo Riga
27	D	Oskars Cibuļskis	1.88 m (6 ft 2 in)	86 kg (190 lb)	April 9, 1988 (aged 29)	(Latvia) Dinamo Riga
28	F	Zemgus Girgensons	1.88 m (6 ft 2 in)	92 kg (203 lb)	January 5, 1994 (aged 23)	(United States) Buffalo Sabres
29	D	Ralfs Freibergs	1.80 m (5 ft 11 in)	87 kg (192 lb)	May 17, 1991 (aged 25)	(Latvia) Dinamo Riga
30	G	Elvis Merzļikins	1.91 m (6 ft 3 in)	85 kg (187 lb)	April 13, 1994 (aged 23)	(Switzerland) HC Lugano
32	D	Artūrs Kulda – A	1.88 m (6 ft 2 in)	97 kg (214 lb)	July 25, 1988 (aged 28)	(Finland) Jokerit
41	F	Frenks Razgals	1.86 m (6 ft 1 in)	81 kg (179 lb)	August 8, 1996 (aged 20)	(Latvia) HK Rīga
58	D	Guntis Galviņš	1.86 m (6 ft 1 in)	87 kg (192 lb)	January 25, 1986 (aged 31)	(Latvia) Dinamo Riga
70	F	Miks Indrašis	1.92 m (6 ft 4 in)	85 kg (187 lb)	September 30, 1990 (aged 26)	(Latvia) Dinamo Riga
71	F	Roberts Bukarts	1.84 m (6 ft 0 in)	84 kg (185 lb)	June 27, 1990 (aged 26)	(Czech Republic) PSG Zlín
72	D	Jānis Jaks	1.83 m (6 ft 0 in)	86 kg (190 lb)	August 22, 1995 (aged 21)	(United States) American International Yellow Jackets
74	G	Ivars Punnenovs	1.85 m (6 ft 1 in)	85 kg (187 lb)	May 30, 1994 (aged 22)	(Switzerland) SCL Tigers
79	F	Vitalijs Pavlovs	1.95 m (6 ft 5 in)	100 kg (220 lb)	June 17, 1989 (aged 27)	(Latvia) Dinamo Riga
87	F	Gints Meija	1.85 m (6 ft 1 in)	90 kg (200 lb)	September 4, 1987 (aged 29)	(Latvia) Dinamo Riga
91	F	Ronalds Ķēniņš	1.82 m (6 ft 0 in)	91 kg (201 lb)	February 28, 1991 (aged 26)	(Switzerland) ZSC Lions
96	F	Māris Bičevskis	1.80 m (5 ft 11 in)	82 kg (181 lb)	August 3, 1991 (aged 25)	(Latvia) Dinamo Riga
98	G	Jānis Kalniņš	1.82 m (6 ft 0 in)	87 kg (192 lb)	December 13, 1991 (aged 25)	(Latvia) Dinamo Riga

=== Russia ===
A 27-player roster was announced on 25 April 2017. It was 28 players on 2 May 2017. One day later, the final roster was set.

Head coach: Oleg Znarok

No.	Pos.	Name	Height	Weight	Birthdate	Team
2	D	Artyom Zub	1.88 m (6 ft 2 in)	90 kg (200 lb)	October 3, 1995 (aged 21)	(Russia) SKA Saint Petersburg
4	D	Vladislav Gavrikov	1.90 m (6 ft 3 in)	97 kg (214 lb)	November 21, 1995 (aged 21)	(Russia) Lokomotiv Yaroslavl
7	F	Ivan Telegin	1.93 m (6 ft 4 in)	92 kg (203 lb)	February 28, 1992 (aged 25)	(Russia) CSKA Moscow
9	D	Viktor Antipin	1.75 m (5 ft 9 in)	80 kg (180 lb)	December 6, 1992 (aged 24)	(Russia) Metallurg Magnitogorsk
10	F	Sergei Mozyakin – C	1.80 m (5 ft 11 in)	87 kg (192 lb)	March 30, 1981 (aged 36)	(Russia) Metallurg Magnitogorsk
11	F	Sergei Andronov	1.88 m (6 ft 2 in)	86 kg (190 lb)	July 19, 1989 (aged 27)	(Russia) HC CSKA Moscow
16	F	Sergei Plotnikov	1.88 m (6 ft 2 in)	90 kg (200 lb)	June 3, 1990 (aged 26)	(Russia) SKA Saint Petersburg
21	F	Alexander Barabanov	1.79 m (5 ft 10 in)	89 kg (196 lb)	June 17, 1994 (aged 22)	(Russia) SKA Saint Petersburg
29	D	Ivan Provorov	1.85 m (6 ft 1 in)	91 kg (201 lb)	January 13, 1997 (aged 20)	(United States) Philadelphia Flyers
30	G	Igor Shestyorkin	1.85 m (6 ft 1 in)	85 kg (187 lb)	December 30, 1995 (aged 21)	(Russia) SKA Saint Petersburg
31	G	Ilya Sorokin	1.88 m (6 ft 2 in)	78 kg (172 lb)	August 4, 1995 (aged 21)	(Russia) HC CSKA Moscow
43	F	Valeri Nichushkin	1.94 m (6 ft 4 in)	95 kg (209 lb)	March 4, 1995 (aged 22)	(Russia) HC CSKA Moscow
55	D	Bogdan Kiselevich	1.84 m (6 ft 0 in)	94 kg (207 lb)	February 14, 1990 (aged 27)	(Russia) HC CSKA Moscow
63	F	Evgenii Dadonov	1.79 m (5 ft 10 in)	84 kg (185 lb)	March 12, 1989 (aged 28)	(Russia) SKA Saint Petersburg
70	F	Vladimir Tkachyov	1.83 m (6 ft 0 in)	95 kg (209 lb)	October 5, 1993 (aged 23)	(Russia) AK Bars Kazan
72	F	Artemi Panarin	1.80 m (5 ft 11 in)	77 kg (170 lb)	October 30, 1991 (aged 25)	(United States) Chicago Blackhawks
77	D	Anton Belov – A	1.93 m (6 ft 4 in)	97 kg (214 lb)	July 29, 1986 (aged 30)	(Russia) SKA Saint Petersburg
81	D	Dmitry Orlov	1.82 m (6 ft 0 in)	92 kg (203 lb)	July 23, 1991 (aged 25)	(United States) Washington Capitals
86	F	Nikita Kucherov	1.80 m (5 ft 11 in)	77 kg (170 lb)	June 17, 1993 (aged 23)	(United States) Tampa Bay Lightning
87	F	Vadim Shipachyov – A	1.83 m (6 ft 0 in)	85 kg (187 lb)	March 12, 1987 (aged 30)	(United States) Vegas Golden Knights
88	G	Andrei Vasilevskiy	1.90 m (6 ft 3 in)	90 kg (200 lb)	July 25, 1994 (aged 22)	(United States) Tampa Bay Lightning
90	F	Vladislav Namestnikov	1.80 m (5 ft 11 in)	82 kg (181 lb)	November 22, 1992 (aged 24)	(United States) Tampa Bay Lightning
92	F	Evgeny Kuznetsov	1.82 m (6 ft 0 in)	83 kg (183 lb)	May 19, 1992 (aged 24)	(United States) Washington Capitals
94	D	Andrei Mironov	1.88 m (6 ft 2 in)	90 kg (200 lb)	July 29, 1994 (aged 22)	(United States) Colorado Avalanche
97	F	Nikita Gusev	1.78 m (5 ft 10 in)	76 kg (168 lb)	July 8, 1992 (aged 24)	(Russia) SKA Saint Petersburg

=== Slovakia ===
A 22-player roster was announced on 31 March 2017. It was 26 players on 25 April 2017. The final roster was revealed on 2 May 2017.

Head coach: Zdeno Cíger

No.	Pos.	Name	Height	Weight	Birthdate	Team
3	D	Adam Jánošík	1.80 m (5 ft 11 in)	80 kg (180 lb)	September 7, 1992 (aged 24)	(Czech Republic) HC Bílí Tygři Liberec
6	F	Lukáš Cingeľ	1.86 m (6 ft 1 in)	88 kg (194 lb)	October 6, 1992 (aged 24)	(Czech Republic) HC Sparta Praha
8	D	Michal Sersen	1.88 m (6 ft 2 in)	92 kg (203 lb)	December 28, 1985 (aged 31)	(Slovakia) HC ’05 Banská Bystrica
9	F	Dávid Skokan	1.82 m (6 ft 0 in)	83 kg (183 lb)	December 6, 1988 (aged 28)	(Czech Republic) Piráti Chomutov
11	D	Peter Čerešňák	1.93 m (6 ft 4 in)	97 kg (214 lb)	January 26, 1993 (aged 24)	(Czech Republic) HC Plzeň
12	D	Eduard Šedivý	1.76 m (5 ft 9 in)	75 kg (165 lb)	January 4, 1992 (aged 25)	(Slovakia) HC Košice
18	F	Andrej Kudrna	1.82 m (6 ft 0 in)	83 kg (183 lb)	May 11, 1991 (aged 25)	(Czech Republic) HC Sparta Praha
19	F	Michel Miklík – A	1.84 m (6 ft 0 in)	90 kg (200 lb)	July 31, 1982 (aged 34)	(Finland) JYP Jyväskylä
21	D	Tomáš Matoušek	1.92 m (6 ft 4 in)	99 kg (218 lb)	June 15, 1992 (aged 24)	(Slovakia) HC ’05 Banská Bystrica
22	F	Vladimír Dravecký – C	1.82 m (6 ft 0 in)	90 kg (200 lb)	June 3, 1985 (aged 31)	(Czech Republic) HC Oceláři Třinec
24	F	Jakub Suja	1.84 m (6 ft 0 in)	89 kg (196 lb)	November 1, 1988 (aged 28)	(Slovakia) HC Košice
26	D	Juraj Mikuš – A	1.94 m (6 ft 4 in)	100 kg (220 lb)	November 30, 1988 (aged 28)	(Czech Republic) HC Sparta Praha
28	D	Martin Gernát	1.92 m (6 ft 4 in)	93 kg (205 lb)	April 11, 1993 (aged 24)	(Czech Republic) HC Sparta Praha
32	G	Jaroslav Janus	1.83 m (6 ft 0 in)	87 kg (192 lb)	September 21, 1989 (aged 27)	(Czech Republic) HC Litvínov
33	G	Július Hudáček	1.84 m (6 ft 0 in)	84 kg (185 lb)	August 9, 1988 (aged 28)	(Sweden) Örebro HK
42	D	Tomáš Zigo	1.86 m (6 ft 1 in)	85 kg (187 lb)	April 11, 1992 (aged 25)	(Slovakia) HC ’05 Banská Bystrica
50	G	Ján Laco	1.83 m (6 ft 0 in)	86 kg (190 lb)	December 1, 1981 (aged 35)	(Czech Republic) Piráti Chomutov
55	F	Mário Bližňák	1.83 m (6 ft 0 in)	89 kg (196 lb)	March 6, 1987 (aged 30)	(Czech Republic) HC Bílí Tygři Liberec
59	F	Andrej Šťastný	1.91 m (6 ft 3 in)	99 kg (218 lb)	January 24, 1991 (aged 26)	(Slovakia) HC Slovan Bratislava
61	D	Peter Trška	1.84 m (6 ft 0 in)	90 kg (200 lb)	June 1, 1992 (aged 24)	(Czech Republic) HC Kometa Brno
65	D	Michal Čajkovský	1.92 m (6 ft 4 in)	99 kg (218 lb)	May 6, 1992 (aged 24)	(Russia) Avtomobilist Yekaterinburg
79	F	Libor Hudáček	1.75 m (5 ft 9 in)	75 kg (165 lb)	September 7, 1990 (aged 26)	(Sweden) Örebro HK
80	F	Tomáš Hrnka	1.96 m (6 ft 5 in)	97 kg (214 lb)	November 11, 1991 (aged 25)	(Czech Republic) HC Plzeň
82	F	Pavol Skalický	1.95 m (6 ft 5 in)	94 kg (207 lb)	October 9, 1995 (aged 21)	(Slovakia) HC ’05 Banská Bystrica
87	F	Marcel Haščák	1.82 m (6 ft 0 in)	87 kg (192 lb)	February 3, 1987 (aged 30)	(Czech Republic) HC Kometa Brno

=== Sweden ===
A 23-player roster was announced on 16 April 2017. It was 26 players on 27 April 2017. On 28 April 2017, 25 players remained on the roster. The final squad was revealed on 1 May 2017.

Head coach: Rikard Grönborg

No.	Pos.	Name	Height	Weight	Birthdate	Team
3	D	John Klingberg	1.88 m (6 ft 2 in)	80 kg (180 lb)	August 14, 1992 (aged 24)	(United States) Dallas Stars
5	D	Philip Holm	1.87 m (6 ft 2 in)	88 kg (194 lb)	December 8, 1991 (aged 25)	(Sweden) Växjö Lakers
6	D	Anton Strålman	1.80 m (5 ft 11 in)	86 kg (190 lb)	August 1, 1986 (aged 30)	(United States) Tampa Bay Lightning
15	F	Oscar Lindberg	1.85 m (6 ft 1 in)	92 kg (203 lb)	October 29, 1991 (aged 25)	(United States) New York Rangers
16	F	Marcus Krüger	1.83 m (6 ft 0 in)	84 kg (185 lb)	May 27, 1990 (aged 26)	(United States) Chicago Blackhawks
18	F	Dennis Everberg	1.93 m (6 ft 4 in)	95 kg (209 lb)	December 31, 1991 (aged 25)	(Sweden) Växjö Lakers
19	F	Nicklas Bäckström	1.85 m (6 ft 1 in)	97 kg (214 lb)	November 23, 1987 (aged 29)	(United States) Washington Capitals
20	F	Joel Lundqvist – C	1.84 m (6 ft 0 in)	91 kg (201 lb)	March 2, 1982 (aged 35)	(Sweden) Frölunda HC
22	F	Joel Eriksson Ek	1.89 m (6 ft 2 in)	92 kg (203 lb)	January 29, 1997 (aged 20)	(United States) Minnesota Wild
23	D	Oliver Ekman-Larsson	1.88 m (6 ft 2 in)	91 kg (201 lb)	July 17, 1991 (aged 25)	(United States) Arizona Coyotes
24	D	Alexander Edler	1.91 m (6 ft 3 in)	97 kg (214 lb)	April 21, 1986 (aged 31)	(Canada) Vancouver Canucks
25	D	Jonas Brodin	1.85 m (6 ft 1 in)	88 kg (194 lb)	July 12, 1993 (aged 23)	(United States) Minnesota Wild
28	F	Elias Lindholm	1.85 m (6 ft 1 in)	87 kg (192 lb)	December 2, 1994 (aged 22)	(United States) Carolina Hurricanes
29	F	William Nylander	1.83 m (6 ft 0 in)	86 kg (190 lb)	May 1, 1996 (aged 21)	(Canada) Toronto Maple Leafs
30	G	Viktor Fasth	1.83 m (6 ft 0 in)	87 kg (192 lb)	August 8, 1982 (aged 34)	(Russia) HC CSKA Moscow
31	G	Eddie Läck	1.96 m (6 ft 5 in)	88 kg (194 lb)	January 5, 1988 (aged 29)	(United States) Carolina Hurricanes
34	F	Carl Söderberg	1.91 m (6 ft 3 in)	95 kg (209 lb)	October 12, 1985 (aged 31)	(United States) Colorado Avalanche
35	G	Henrik Lundqvist	1.85 m (6 ft 1 in)	85 kg (187 lb)	March 2, 1982 (aged 35)	(United States) New York Rangers
42	F	Joakim Nordström	1.85 m (6 ft 1 in)	86 kg (190 lb)	February 25, 1992 (aged 25)	(United States) Carolina Hurricanes
48	F	Carl Klingberg	1.90 m (6 ft 3 in)	96 kg (212 lb)	January 28, 1991 (aged 26)	(Switzerland) EV Zug
49	F	Victor Rask	1.88 m (6 ft 2 in)	91 kg (201 lb)	March 1, 1993 (aged 24)	(United States) Carolina Hurricanes
67	F	Linus Omark	1.80 m (5 ft 11 in)	82 kg (181 lb)	February 5, 1987 (aged 30)	(Russia) Salavat Yulaev Ufa
71	F	William Karlsson	1.85 m (6 ft 1 in)	86 kg (190 lb)	January 8, 1993 (aged 24)	(United States) Columbus Blue Jackets
77	D	Victor Hedman – A	1.98 m (6 ft 6 in)	101 kg (223 lb)	December 18, 1990 (aged 26)	(United States) Tampa Bay Lightning
92	F	Gabriel Landeskog – A	1.85 m (6 ft 1 in)	98 kg (216 lb)	November 23, 1992 (aged 24)	(United States) Colorado Avalanche

=== United States ===
A 15-player roster was named on 13 April 2017, and a day later, Noah Hanifin and Clayton Keller were added. Jack Eichel was added on 19 April, while Johnny Gaudreau was added on 21 April and Charlie McAvoy and Trevor van Riemsdyk on 26 April. On 27 April, Nick Schmaltz was added.

Head coach: Jeff Blashill

No.	Pos.	Name	Height	Weight	Birthdate	Team
5	D	Connor Murphy – C	1.93 m (6 ft 4 in)	96 kg (212 lb)	March 26, 1993 (aged 24)	(United States) Arizona Coyotes
6	D	Daniel Brickley	1.91 m (6 ft 3 in)	93 kg (205 lb)	March 30, 1995 (aged 22)	(United States) Minnesota State Univ.
7	F	J. T. Compher	1.82 m (6 ft 0 in)	87 kg (192 lb)	April 8, 1995 (aged 22)	(United States) Colorado Avalanche
8	D	Jacob Trouba	1.91 m (6 ft 3 in)	92 kg (203 lb)	February 26, 1994 (aged 23)	(Canada) Winnipeg Jets
9	F	Andrew Copp	1.85 m (6 ft 1 in)	93 kg (205 lb)	July 8, 1994 (aged 22)	(Canada) Winnipeg Jets
10	F	Anders Bjork	1.82 m (6 ft 0 in)	82 kg (181 lb)	August 5, 1996 (aged 20)	(United States) Univ. of Notre Dame
12	F	Jordan Greenway	1.98 m (6 ft 6 in)	104 kg (229 lb)	February 16, 1997 (aged 20)	(United States) Boston Univ.
13	F	Johnny Gaudreau	1.73 m (5 ft 8 in)	72 kg (159 lb)	August 13, 1993 (aged 23)	(Canada) Calgary Flames
14	F	Nick Bjugstad	1.98 m (6 ft 6 in)	99 kg (218 lb)	July 17, 1992 (aged 24)	(United States) Florida Panthers
15	F	Jack Eichel	1.88 m (6 ft 2 in)	89 kg (196 lb)	October 28, 1996 (aged 20)	(United States) Buffalo Sabres
17	F	Nick Schmaltz	1.82 m (6 ft 0 in)	80 kg (180 lb)	February 23, 1996 (aged 21)	(United States) Chicago Blackhawks
18	F	Christian Dvorak	1.82 m (6 ft 0 in)	85 kg (187 lb)	February 2, 1996 (aged 21)	(United States) Arizona Coyotes
19	F	Clayton Keller	1.79 m (5 ft 10 in)	76 kg (168 lb)	July 29, 1998 (aged 18)	(United States) Arizona Coyotes
21	F	Dylan Larkin – A	1.85 m (6 ft 1 in)	86 kg (190 lb)	July 30, 1996 (aged 20)	(United States) Detroit Red Wings
25	D	Charlie McAvoy	1.85 m (6 ft 1 in)	96 kg (212 lb)	December 21, 1997 (aged 19)	(United States) Boston Bruins
26	F	Kevin Hayes	1.96 m (6 ft 5 in)	100 kg (220 lb)	May 8, 1992 (aged 24)	(United States) New York Rangers
27	F	Anders Lee	1.91 m (6 ft 3 in)	103 kg (227 lb)	July 3, 1990 (aged 26)	(United States) New York Islanders
29	F	Brock Nelson – A	1.91 m (6 ft 3 in)	93 kg (205 lb)	October 15, 1991 (aged 25)	(United States) New York Islanders
35	G	Jimmy Howard	1.85 m (6 ft 1 in)	99 kg (218 lb)	March 26, 1984 (aged 33)	(United States) Detroit Red Wings
37	G	Connor Hellebuyck	1.93 m (6 ft 4 in)	94 kg (207 lb)	May 19, 1993 (aged 23)	(Canada) Winnipeg Jets
40	G	Cal Petersen	1.91 m (6 ft 3 in)	86 kg (190 lb)	October 19, 1994 (aged 22)	(United States) Univ. of Notre Dame
55	D	Noah Hanifin	1.91 m (6 ft 3 in)	93 kg (205 lb)	January 25, 1997 (aged 20)	(United States) Carolina Hurricanes
57	D	Trevor van Riemsdyk	1.88 m (6 ft 2 in)	85 kg (187 lb)	July 24, 1991 (aged 25)	(United States) Chicago Blackhawks
65	D	Danny DeKeyser	1.91 m (6 ft 3 in)	87 kg (192 lb)	March 7, 1990 (aged 27)	(United States) Detroit Red Wings
76	D	Brady Skjei	1.91 m (6 ft 3 in)	93 kg (205 lb)	March 26, 1994 (aged 23)	(United States) New York Rangers

== Group B ==
=== Belarus ===
A 30-player roster was announced on 27 March 2017. It was trimmed to 26 on 14 April 2017. The final roster was revealed on 2 May 2017.

Head Coach: Dave Lewis

No.	Pos.	Name	Height	Weight	Birthdate	Team
7	D	Vladimir Denisov – A	1.81 m (5 ft 11 in)	94 kg (207 lb)	June 29, 1984 (aged 32)	(Russia) Traktor Chelyabinsk
8	D	Ilya Shinkevich	1.89 m (6 ft 2 in)	86 kg (190 lb)	September 1, 1989 (aged 27)	(Belarus) HC Dinamo Minsk
10	F	Mikhail Stefanovich	1.88 m (6 ft 2 in)	93 kg (205 lb)	November 27, 1989 (aged 27)	(Belarus) HK Neman Grodno
11	F	Alexander Kulakov	1.82 m (6 ft 0 in)	91 kg (201 lb)	May 15, 1983 (aged 33)	(Belarus) HC Dinamo Minsk
13	F	Sergei Drozd	1.81 m (5 ft 11 in)	77 kg (170 lb)	April 14, 1990 (aged 27)	(Belarus) HC Dinamo Minsk
14	D	Yevgeni Lisovets	1.83 m (6 ft 0 in)	90 kg (200 lb)	November 12, 1994 (aged 22)	(Belarus) HC Dinamo Minsk
15	F	Artem Demkov	1.78 m (5 ft 10 in)	78 kg (172 lb)	September 26, 1989 (aged 27)	(Belarus) HC Shakhtyor Soligorsk
17	F	Yegor Sharangovich	1.82 m (6 ft 0 in)	80 kg (180 lb)	June 6, 1998 (aged 18)	(Belarus) Dinamo-Raubichi Minsk
18	D	Kristian Khenkel	1.82 m (6 ft 0 in)	85 kg (187 lb)	July 11, 1995 (aged 21)	(Belarus) HC Dinamo Minsk
22	F	Danila Karaban	1.79 m (5 ft 10 in)	77 kg (170 lb)	July 26, 1996 (aged 20)	(Belarus) HC Dinamo Minsk
23	F	Andrei Stas – C	1.89 m (6 ft 2 in)	88 kg (194 lb)	October 18, 1988 (aged 28)	(Belarus) HC Dinamo Minsk
25	D	Oleg Yevenko	2.01 m (6 ft 7 in)	104 kg (229 lb)	January 21, 1991 (aged 26)	(United States) Cleveland Monsters
35	G	Kevin Lalande	1.82 m (6 ft 0 in)	83 kg (183 lb)	February 19, 1987 (aged 30)	(Belarus) HC Dinamo Minsk
46	F	Andrei Kostitsyn	1.83 m (6 ft 0 in)	98 kg (216 lb)	February 3, 1985 (aged 32)	(Russia) HC Sochi
55	D	Pavel Vorobey	1.90 m (6 ft 3 in)	90 kg (200 lb)	September 10, 1997 (aged 19)	(Belarus) HC Dinamo Molodechno
69	G	Mikhail Karnaukhov	1.84 m (6 ft 0 in)	80 kg (180 lb)	February 22, 1994 (aged 23)	(Belarus) HC Dinamo Minsk
70	F	Charles Linglet	1.88 m (6 ft 2 in)	92 kg (203 lb)	June 22, 1982 (aged 34)	(Germany) Eisbären Berlin
71	F	Alexander Pavlovich – A	1.84 m (6 ft 0 in)	86 kg (190 lb)	July 12, 1988 (aged 28)	(Belarus) HC Dinamo Minsk
74	F	Sergei Kostitsyn	1.83 m (6 ft 0 in)	96 kg (212 lb)	March 20, 1987 (aged 30)	(Belarus) HC Dinamo Minsk
79	G	Vitali Trus	1.83 m (6 ft 0 in)	78 kg (172 lb)	June 24, 1988 (aged 28)	(Belarus) HK Neman Grodno
85	F	Artyom Volkov	1.80 m (5 ft 11 in)	78 kg (172 lb)	January 28, 1985 (aged 32)	(Belarus) HC Dinamo Minsk
88	F	Evgeni Kovyrshin	1.78 m (5 ft 10 in)	78 kg (172 lb)	January 25, 1986 (aged 31)	(Belarus) HC Dinamo Minsk
89	D	Dmitry Korobov	1.90 m (6 ft 3 in)	108 kg (238 lb)	March 12, 1989 (aged 28)	(Belarus) HC Dinamo Minsk
92	D	Raman Hrabarenka	1.88 m (6 ft 2 in)	96 kg (212 lb)	August 24, 1992 (aged 24)	(Belarus) HC Dinamo Minsk
95	F	Alexander Kogalev	1.82 m (6 ft 0 in)	78 kg (172 lb)	May 22, 1994 (aged 22)	(Belarus) Yunost Minsk

=== Canada ===
An 18-player roster was named on 19 April 2017. On 28 April 2017 Marc-Édouard Vlasic, Brayden Schenn, Mitch Marner, and Chad Johnson were added, to bring the roster to 22 players.

Head coach: Jon Cooper

No.	Pos.	Name	Height	Weight	Birthdate	Team
1	G	Eric Comrie	1.85 m (6 ft 1 in)	79 kg (174 lb)	July 6, 1995 (aged 21)	(Canada) Manitoba Moose
4	D	Tyson Barrie	1.78 m (5 ft 10 in)	86 kg (190 lb)	June 26, 1991 (aged 25)	(United States) Colorado Avalanche
5	D	Jason Demers	1.85 m (6 ft 1 in)	91 kg (201 lb)	June 9, 1988 (aged 28)	(United States) Florida Panthers
7	D	Josh Morrissey	1.83 m (6 ft 0 in)	88 kg (194 lb)	March 28, 1995 (aged 22)	(Canada) Winnipeg Jets
9	F	Matt Duchene	1.85 m (6 ft 1 in)	90 kg (200 lb)	January 16, 1991 (aged 26)	(United States) Colorado Avalanche
10	F	Brayden Schenn	1.85 m (6 ft 1 in)	86 kg (190 lb)	August 22, 1991 (aged 25)	(United States) Philadelphia Flyers
11	F	Travis Konecny	1.79 m (5 ft 10 in)	80 kg (180 lb)	March 11, 1997 (aged 20)	(United States) Philadelphia Flyers
12	D	Colton Parayko	1.96 m (6 ft 5 in)	97 kg (214 lb)	May 12, 1993 (aged 23)	(United States) St. Louis Blues
14	F	Sean Couturier	1.86 m (6 ft 1 in)	89 kg (196 lb)	December 7, 1992 (aged 24)	(United States) Philadelphia Flyers
16	F	Mitch Marner	1.81 m (5 ft 11 in)	77 kg (170 lb)	May 5, 1997 (aged 20)	(Canada) Toronto Maple Leafs
17	F	Wayne Simmonds	1.88 m (6 ft 2 in)	83 kg (183 lb)	August 26, 1988 (aged 28)	(United States) Philadelphia Flyers
19	D	Mike Matheson	1.88 m (6 ft 2 in)	86 kg (190 lb)	February 27, 1994 (aged 23)	(United States) Florida Panthers
21	F	Brayden Point	1.80 m (5 ft 11 in)	75 kg (165 lb)	March 13, 1996 (aged 21)	(United States) Tampa Bay Lightning
24	D	Calvin de Haan	1.85 m (6 ft 1 in)	89 kg (196 lb)	May 9, 1991 (aged 25)	(United States) New York Islanders
28	F	Claude Giroux – C	1.80 m (5 ft 11 in)	83 kg (183 lb)	January 12, 1988 (aged 29)	(United States) Philadelphia Flyers
29	F	Nathan MacKinnon	1.82 m (6 ft 0 in)	85 kg (187 lb)	September 1, 1995 (aged 21)	(United States) Colorado Avalanche
30	G	Chad Johnson	1.91 m (6 ft 3 in)	89 kg (196 lb)	June 10, 1986 (aged 30)	(Canada) Calgary Flames
31	G	Calvin Pickard	1.85 m (6 ft 1 in)	92 kg (203 lb)	April 15, 1992 (aged 25)	(United States) Colorado Avalanche
42	D	Chris Lee	1.80 m (5 ft 11 in)	84 kg (185 lb)	October 3, 1980 (aged 36)	(Russia) Metallurg Magnitogorsk
44	D	Marc-Édouard Vlasic – A	1.85 m (6 ft 1 in)	93 kg (205 lb)	March 30, 1987 (aged 30)	(United States) San Jose Sharks
53	F	Jeff Skinner	1.80 m (5 ft 11 in)	92 kg (203 lb)	May 16, 1992 (aged 24)	(United States) Carolina Hurricanes
55	F	Mark Scheifele	1.88 m (6 ft 2 in)	89 kg (196 lb)	March 15, 1993 (aged 24)	(Canada) Winnipeg Jets
71	F	Alex Killorn	1.88 m (6 ft 2 in)	88 kg (194 lb)	September 14, 1989 (aged 27)	(United States) Tampa Bay Lightning
90	F	Ryan O'Reilly – A	1.83 m (6 ft 0 in)	96 kg (212 lb)	February 7, 1991 (aged 26)	(United States) Buffalo Sabres

=== Czech Republic ===
A 31-player roster was announced on 14 April 2017. On 22 April 2017, it was reduced to 29. The roster was set to 27 on 30 April 2017.

Head coach: Josef Jandač

No.	Pos.	Name	Height	Weight	Birthdate	Team
3	D	Radko Gudas	1.83 m (6 ft 0 in)	93 kg (205 lb)	June 5, 1990 (aged 26)	(United States) Philadelphia Flyers
5	D	Jakub Jeřábek	1.80 m (5 ft 11 in)	86 kg (190 lb)	May 12, 1991 (aged 25)	(Canada) Montreal Canadiens
6	D	Michal Kempný	1.83 m (6 ft 0 in)	88 kg (194 lb)	September 8, 1990 (aged 26)	(United States) Chicago Blackhawks
8	D	Libor Šulák	1.89 m (6 ft 2 in)	86 kg (190 lb)	March 4, 1994 (aged 23)	(Czech Republic) Orli Znojmo
10	F	Roman Červenka	1.82 m (6 ft 0 in)	89 kg (196 lb)	December 10, 1985 (aged 31)	(Switzerland) HC Fribourg-Gottéron
14	F	Tomáš Plekanec – A	1.78 m (5 ft 10 in)	90 kg (200 lb)	October 31, 1982 (aged 34)	(Canada) Montreal Canadiens
16	F	Michal Birner	1.83 m (6 ft 0 in)	83 kg (183 lb)	March 2, 1986 (aged 31)	(Switzerland) HC Fribourg-Gottéron
17	F	Vladimír Sobotka	1.78 m (5 ft 10 in)	83 kg (183 lb)	February 7, 1987 (aged 30)	(United States) St. Louis Blues
20	F	Petr Vrána	1.77 m (5 ft 10 in)	83 kg (183 lb)	March 29, 1985 (aged 32)	(Czech Republic) HC Sparta Praha
33	G	Pavel Francouz	1.82 m (6 ft 0 in)	81 kg (179 lb)	June 3, 1990 (aged 26)	(Russia) Traktor Chelyabinsk
34	G	Petr Mrázek	1.87 m (6 ft 2 in)	84 kg (185 lb)	February 14, 1992 (aged 25)	(United States) Detroit Red Wings
36	D	Jakub Krejčík	1.87 m (6 ft 2 in)	90 kg (200 lb)	June 25, 1991 (aged 25)	(Czech Republic) HC Kometa Brno
38	G	Dominik Furch	1.88 m (6 ft 2 in)	91 kg (201 lb)	April 19, 1990 (aged 27)	(Russia) Avangard Omsk
43	F	Jan Kovář – A	1.81 m (5 ft 11 in)	98 kg (216 lb)	March 20, 1990 (aged 27)	(Russia) Metallurg Magnitogorsk
45	D	Radim Šimek	1.80 m (5 ft 11 in)	89 kg (196 lb)	September 20, 1992 (aged 24)	(Czech Republic) HC Bílí Tygři Liberec
51	F	Roman Horák	1.82 m (6 ft 0 in)	77 kg (170 lb)	May 21, 1991 (aged 25)	(Russia) HC Vityaz
62	F	Michal Řepík	1.78 m (5 ft 10 in)	82 kg (181 lb)	December 31, 1988 (aged 28)	(Czech Republic) HC Sparta Praha
69	F	Lukáš Radil	1.91 m (6 ft 3 in)	91 kg (201 lb)	August 5, 1990 (aged 26)	(Russia) HC Spartak Moscow
71	F	Tomáš Hyka	1.80 m (5 ft 11 in)	76 kg (168 lb)	March 23, 1993 (aged 24)	(Czech Republic) BK Mladá Boleslav
78	F	Robin Hanzl	1.84 m (6 ft 0 in)	78 kg (172 lb)	January 10, 1989 (aged 28)	(Czech Republic) HC Litvínov
79	F	Tomáš Zohorna	1.85 m (6 ft 1 in)	83 kg (183 lb)	January 3, 1988 (aged 29)	(Russia) Amur Khabarovsk
84	D	Tomáš Kundrátek	1.87 m (6 ft 2 in)	91 kg (201 lb)	December 26, 1989 (aged 27)	(Slovakia) HC Slovan Bratislava
88	F	David Pastrňák	1.82 m (6 ft 0 in)	82 kg (181 lb)	May 25, 1996 (aged 20)	(United States) Boston Bruins
90	D	Jan Rutta	1.90 m (6 ft 3 in)	90 kg (200 lb)	July 29, 1990 (aged 26)	(Czech Republic) Piráti Chomutov
93	F	Jakub Voráček – C	1.89 m (6 ft 2 in)	97 kg (214 lb)	August 15, 1989 (aged 27)	(United States) Philadelphia Flyers

=== Finland ===
A 26-player roster was announced on 9 April 2017. It was renewed to 27 on 23 April 2017. The final roster was revealed on 1 May 2017.

Head coach: Lauri Marjamäki

No.	Pos.	Name	Height	Weight	Birthdate	Team
4	D	Mikko Lehtonen	1.83 m (6 ft 0 in)	88 kg (194 lb)	January 16, 1994 (aged 23)	(Sweden) HV71
5	D	Lasse Kukkonen – C	1.83 m (6 ft 0 in)	85 kg (187 lb)	September 18, 1981 (aged 35)	(Finland) Oulun Kärpät
6	D	Topi Jaakola – A	1.88 m (6 ft 2 in)	90 kg (200 lb)	November 15, 1983 (aged 33)	(Finland) Jokerit
15	F	Miro Aaltonen	1.80 m (5 ft 11 in)	78 kg (172 lb)	June 7, 1993 (aged 23)	(Russia) HC Vityaz
19	F	Veli-Matti Savinainen	1.81 m (5 ft 11 in)	77 kg (170 lb)	January 5, 1986 (aged 31)	(Finland) Tappara
20	F	Sebastian Aho	1.81 m (5 ft 11 in)	80 kg (180 lb)	July 26, 1997 (aged 19)	(United States) Carolina Hurricanes
23	F	Joonas Kemppainen	1.88 m (6 ft 2 in)	100 kg (220 lb)	April 7, 1988 (aged 29)	(Russia) HC Sibir Novosibirsk
24	F	Jani Lajunen	1.85 m (6 ft 1 in)	75 kg (165 lb)	June 16, 1990 (aged 26)	(Finland) Tappara
29	G	Harri Säteri	1.84 m (6 ft 0 in)	92 kg (203 lb)	December 29, 1989 (aged 27)	(Russia) HC Vityaz
31	G	Joni Ortio	1.86 m (6 ft 1 in)	85 kg (187 lb)	April 16, 1991 (aged 26)	(Sweden) Skellefteå AIK
33	F	Markus Hännikäinen	1.88 m (6 ft 2 in)	85 kg (187 lb)	March 26, 1993 (aged 24)	(United States) Columbus Blue Jackets
36	D	Joonas Järvinen	1.90 m (6 ft 3 in)	100 kg (220 lb)	January 5, 1989 (aged 28)	(China) HC Kunlun Red Star
37	F	Mika Pyörälä	1.82 m (6 ft 0 in)	81 kg (179 lb)	July 13, 1981 (aged 35)	(Finland) Oulun Kärpät
38	D	Juuso Hietanen	1.80 m (5 ft 11 in)	85 kg (187 lb)	June 14, 1985 (aged 31)	(Russia) HC Dynamo Moscow
39	F	Jesse Puljujärvi	1.92 m (6 ft 4 in)	93 kg (205 lb)	May 7, 1998 (aged 18)	(United States) Bakersfield Condors
40	F	Tomi Sallinen	1.84 m (6 ft 0 in)	80 kg (180 lb)	February 11, 1989 (aged 28)	(China) HC Kunlun Red Star
41	F	Antti Pihlström	1.80 m (5 ft 11 in)	82 kg (181 lb)	October 22, 1984 (aged 32)	(Finland) Jokerit
47	D	Ville Lajunen	1.84 m (6 ft 0 in)	84 kg (185 lb)	March 8, 1988 (aged 29)	(Finland) Jokerit
50	F	Juhamatti Aaltonen	1.84 m (6 ft 0 in)	85 kg (187 lb)	June 4, 1985 (aged 31)	(Finland) HIFK
51	F	Valtteri Filppula – A	1.82 m (6 ft 0 in)	84 kg (185 lb)	March 20, 1984 (aged 33)	(United States) Philadelphia Flyers
55	D	Atte Ohtamaa	1.88 m (6 ft 2 in)	92 kg (203 lb)	November 6, 1987 (aged 29)	(Russia) Ak Bars Kazan
60	D	Julius Honka	1.79 m (5 ft 10 in)	80 kg (180 lb)	March 12, 1995 (aged 22)	(United States) Dallas Stars
62	F	Oskar Osala	1.93 m (6 ft 4 in)	101 kg (223 lb)	December 26, 1987 (aged 29)	(Russia) Metallurg Magnitogorsk
70	G	Joonas Korpisalo	1.90 m (6 ft 3 in)	83 kg (183 lb)	April 28, 1994 (aged 23)	(United States) Columbus Blue Jackets
96	F	Mikko Rantanen	1.92 m (6 ft 4 in)	98 kg (216 lb)	October 29, 1996 (aged 20)	(United States) Colorado Avalanche

=== France ===
A 23-player roster was announced on 5 April 2017. A new 25-player roster was revealed on 24 April 2017. The final roster was set on 2 May 2017.

Head coach: Dave Henderson

No.	Pos.	Name	Height	Weight	Birthdate	Team
3	D	Jonathan Janil	1.88 m (6 ft 2 in)	95 kg (209 lb)	September 24, 1987 (aged 29)	(France) Boxers de Bordeaux
4	D	Antonin Manavian	1.91 m (6 ft 3 in)	98 kg (216 lb)	April 26, 1987 (aged 30)	(Hungary) Alba Volán Székesfehérvár
9	F	Damien Fleury	1.80 m (5 ft 11 in)	84 kg (185 lb)	February 1, 1986 (aged 31)	(China) HC Kunlun Red Star
10	F	Laurent Meunier – C	1.81 m (5 ft 11 in)	82 kg (181 lb)	January 16, 1979 (aged 38)	(Switzerland) HC La Chaux-de-Fonds
12	F	Valentin Claireaux	1.80 m (5 ft 11 in)	88 kg (194 lb)	April 5, 1991 (aged 26)	(Finland) Lukko
14	F	Stéphane Da Costa	1.81 m (5 ft 11 in)	81 kg (179 lb)	July 11, 1989 (aged 27)	(Russia) HC CSKA Moscow
18	D	Yohann Auvitu	1.82 m (6 ft 0 in)	89 kg (196 lb)	July 27, 1989 (aged 27)	(United States) New Jersey Devils
21	F	Antoine Roussel	1.83 m (6 ft 0 in)	90 kg (200 lb)	November 21, 1989 (aged 27)	(United States) Dallas Stars
23	F	Maurin Bouvet	1.81 m (5 ft 11 in)	79 kg (174 lb)	May 28, 1995 (aged 21)	(France) Rapaces de Gap
25	F	Nicolas Ritz	1.82 m (6 ft 0 in)	87 kg (192 lb)	February 26, 1992 (aged 25)	(Denmark) Herning Blue Fox
27	F	Loïc Lampérier	1.87 m (6 ft 2 in)	90 kg (200 lb)	August 7, 1989 (aged 27)	(France) Dragons de Rouen
28	D	Damien Raux	1.78 m (5 ft 10 in)	84 kg (185 lb)	November 3, 1984 (aged 32)	(France) Dragons de Rouen
29	F	Floran Douay	1.91 m (6 ft 3 in)	95 kg (209 lb)	February 7, 1995 (aged 22)	(Switzerland) Genève-Servette HC
33	G	Ronan Quemener	1.86 m (6 ft 1 in)	86 kg (190 lb)	February 13, 1988 (aged 29)	(Denmark) Aalborg Pirates
39	G	Cristobal Huet	1.83 m (6 ft 0 in)	91 kg (201 lb)	September 3, 1975 (aged 41)	(Switzerland) Lausanne HC
41	F	Pierre-Édouard Bellemare – A	1.82 m (6 ft 0 in)	89 kg (196 lb)	March 6, 1985 (aged 32)	(United States) Philadelphia Flyers
44	D	Olivier Dame-Malka	1.79 m (5 ft 10 in)	87 kg (192 lb)	May 30, 1990 (aged 26)	(France) Dragons de Rouen
49	G	Florian Hardy	1.83 m (6 ft 0 in)	83 kg (183 lb)	February 8, 1985 (aged 32)	(Austria) Dornbirner EC
62	D	Florian Chakiachvili	1.86 m (6 ft 1 in)	87 kg (192 lb)	March 18, 1992 (aged 25)	(France) Dragons de Rouen
72	F	Jordann Perret	1.78 m (5 ft 10 in)	79 kg (174 lb)	October 15, 1994 (aged 22)	(France) Dragons de Rouen
74	D	Nicolas Besch	1.79 m (5 ft 10 in)	87 kg (192 lb)	October 25, 1984 (aged 32)	(France) Boxers de Bordeaux
77	F	Sacha Treille	1.94 m (6 ft 4 in)	95 kg (209 lb)	November 6, 1987 (aged 29)	(France) Dragons de Rouen
80	F	Teddy Da Costa	1.80 m (5 ft 11 in)	85 kg (187 lb)	February 17, 1986 (aged 31)	(Czech Republic) Orli Znojmo
81	F	Anthony Rech	1.80 m (5 ft 11 in)	88 kg (194 lb)	July 9, 1992 (aged 24)	(France) Rapaces de Gap
84	D	Kévin Hecquefeuille – A	1.81 m (5 ft 11 in)	84 kg (185 lb)	November 20, 1984 (aged 32)	(Switzerland) HC La Chaux-de-Fonds

=== Norway ===
A 26-player roster was announced on 14 April 2017. It was reduced to 24 on 27 April 2017. The final roster was set on 3 May 2017.

Head coach: Petter Thoresen

No.	Pos.	Name	Height	Weight	Birthdate	Team
4	D	Johannes Johannesen	1.81 m (5 ft 11 in)	85 kg (187 lb)	March 1, 1997 (aged 20)	(Sweden) Frölunda HC
5	D	Erlend Lesund	1.89 m (6 ft 2 in)	90 kg (200 lb)	December 11, 1994 (aged 22)	(Sweden) Mora IK
6	D	Jonas Holøs – C	1.80 m (5 ft 11 in)	93 kg (205 lb)	August 27, 1987 (aged 29)	(Sweden) Färjestad BK
8	F	Mathias Trettenes	1.79 m (5 ft 10 in)	76 kg (168 lb)	November 8, 1993 (aged 23)	(Sweden) Almtuna IS
10	D	Mattias Nørstebø	1.78 m (5 ft 10 in)	82 kg (181 lb)	June 3, 1995 (aged 21)	(Sweden) Frölunda HC
13	F	Sondre Olden	1.94 m (6 ft 4 in)	84 kg (185 lb)	August 29, 1992 (aged 24)	(Sweden) Leksands IF
14	D	Dennis Sveum	1.85 m (6 ft 1 in)	86 kg (190 lb)	November 27, 1986 (aged 30)	(Norway) Stavanger Oilers
20	F	Anders Bastiansen	1.90 m (6 ft 3 in)	93 kg (205 lb)	October 31, 1980 (aged 36)	(Norway) Frisk Asker Ishockey
22	F	Martin Røymark	1.84 m (6 ft 0 in)	86 kg (190 lb)	November 10, 1986 (aged 30)	(Finland) Tappara
24	F	Andreas Martinsen	1.90 m (6 ft 3 in)	100 kg (220 lb)	June 12, 1990 (aged 26)	(Canada) Montreal Canadiens
26	F	Kristian Forsberg	1.85 m (6 ft 1 in)	88 kg (194 lb)	May 5, 1986 (aged 31)	(Norway) Stavanger Oilers
28	F	Niklas Roest	1.74 m (5 ft 9 in)	80 kg (180 lb)	August 3, 1986 (aged 30)	(Norway) Sparta Warriors
30	G	Lars Haugen	1.85 m (6 ft 1 in)	83 kg (183 lb)	March 19, 1987 (aged 30)	(Sweden) Färjestad BK
33	G	Henrik Haukeland	1.68 m (5 ft 6 in)	83 kg (183 lb)	December 6, 1994 (aged 22)	(Sweden) Leksands IF
40	F	Ken André Olimb	1.79 m (5 ft 10 in)	81 kg (179 lb)	January 21, 1989 (aged 28)	(Sweden) Linköpings HC
41	F	Patrick Thoresen – A	1.83 m (6 ft 0 in)	90 kg (200 lb)	November 7, 1983 (aged 33)	(Switzerland) ZSC Lions
42	D	Henrik Ødegaard	1.80 m (5 ft 11 in)	89 kg (196 lb)	February 12, 1988 (aged 29)	(Norway) Frisk Asker Ishockey
46	F	Mathis Olimb – A	1.77 m (5 ft 10 in)	79 kg (174 lb)	February 1, 1986 (aged 31)	(Sweden) Linköpings HC
47	D	Alexander Bonsaksen	1.80 m (5 ft 11 in)	84 kg (185 lb)	January 24, 1987 (aged 30)	(Finland) Tappara
51	F	Mats Rosseli Olsen	1.80 m (5 ft 11 in)	83 kg (183 lb)	April 29, 1991 (aged 26)	(Sweden) Frölunda HC
61	F	Aleksander Reichenberg	1.86 m (6 ft 1 in)	77 kg (170 lb)	June 13, 1992 (aged 24)	(Norway) Storhamar Ishockey
70	G	Steffen Søberg	1.80 m (5 ft 11 in)	78 kg (172 lb)	August 6, 1993 (aged 23)	(Norway) Vålerenga Ishockey
82	F	Jørgen Karterud	1.93 m (6 ft 4 in)	90 kg (200 lb)	May 6, 1994 (aged 22)	(Sweden) Linköpings HC
90	D	Daniel Sørvik	1.83 m (6 ft 0 in)	83 kg (183 lb)	March 11, 1990 (aged 27)	(Czech Republic) HC Litvínov
93	F	Thomas Valkvæ Olsen	1.86 m (6 ft 1 in)	88 kg (194 lb)	May 18, 1993 (aged 23)	(Sweden) BIK Karlskoga

=== Slovenia ===
A 24-player roster was announced on 2 April 2017. The final roster was revealed on 1 May 2017.

Head coach: Nik Zupančič

No.	Pos.	Name	Height	Weight	Birthdate	Team
4	D	Andrej Tavželj	1.88 m (6 ft 2 in)	95 kg (209 lb)	March 14, 1984 (aged 33)	(France) Ducs d'Angers
7	D	Klemen Pretnar	1.80 m (5 ft 11 in)	82 kg (181 lb)	August 31, 1986 (aged 30)	(Belarus) Yunost Minsk
8	F	Žiga Jeglič	1.85 m (6 ft 1 in)	80 kg (180 lb)	February 24, 1988 (aged 29)	(Slovakia) HC Slovan Bratislava
12	F	David Rodman	1.85 m (6 ft 1 in)	83 kg (183 lb)	September 10, 1983 (aged 33)	(France) Brûleurs de Loups
14	D	Matic Podlipnik	1.81 m (5 ft 11 in)	83 kg (183 lb)	August 9, 1992 (aged 24)	(France) LHC Les Lions
15	D	Blaž Gregorc	1.90 m (6 ft 3 in)	95 kg (209 lb)	January 18, 1990 (aged 27)	(Czech Republic) Mountfield HK
16	F	Aleš Mušič	1.76 m (5 ft 9 in)	82 kg (181 lb)	June 28, 1982 (aged 34)	(Slovenia) HDD Olimpija Ljubljana
18	F	Ken Ograjenšek	1.77 m (5 ft 10 in)	75 kg (165 lb)	August 30, 1991 (aged 25)	(Austria) Graz 99ers
19	F	Žiga Pance	1.85 m (6 ft 1 in)	89 kg (196 lb)	January 1, 1989 (aged 28)	(Austria) EC KAC
23	D	Luka Vidmar	1.85 m (6 ft 1 in)	90 kg (200 lb)	May 17, 1986 (aged 30)	(Denmark) Frederikshavn White Hawks
24	F	Rok Tičar	1.80 m (5 ft 11 in)	82 kg (181 lb)	May 3, 1989 (aged 28)	(Russia) Avtomobilist Yekaterinburg
26	F	Jan Urbas – A	1.92 m (6 ft 4 in)	98 kg (216 lb)	January 26, 1989 (aged 28)	(Austria) EC VSV
28	D	Aleš Kranjc	1.82 m (6 ft 0 in)	91 kg (201 lb)	July 29, 1981 (aged 35)	(Germany) Rote Teufel Bad Nauheim
32	G	Gašper Krošelj	1.88 m (6 ft 2 in)	86 kg (190 lb)	February 9, 1987 (aged 30)	(Sweden) AIK IF
39	F	Jan Muršak – C	1.80 m (5 ft 11 in)	87 kg (192 lb)	January 20, 1988 (aged 29)	(Russia) HC CSKA Moscow
40	G	Luka Gračnar	1.78 m (5 ft 10 in)	83 kg (183 lb)	October 31, 1993 (aged 23)	(Austria) EC Red Bull Salzburg
51	D	Mitja Robar	1.77 m (5 ft 10 in)	86 kg (190 lb)	January 4, 1983 (aged 34)	(Austria) EC KAC
55	F	Robert Sabolič	1.83 m (6 ft 0 in)	90 kg (200 lb)	September 18, 1988 (aged 28)	(Russia) Admiral Vladivostok
61	D	Jurij Repe	1.86 m (6 ft 1 in)	90 kg (200 lb)	September 17, 1994 (aged 22)	(Czech Republic) Kladno
69	G	Matija Pintarič	1.81 m (5 ft 11 in)	78 kg (172 lb)	August 11, 1989 (aged 27)	(France) LHC Les Lions
71	F	Boštjan Goličič	1.83 m (6 ft 0 in)	88 kg (194 lb)	June 12, 1989 (aged 27)	(France) Brûleurs de Loups
76	F	Nik Pem	1.87 m (6 ft 2 in)	89 kg (196 lb)	August 30, 1995 (aged 21)	(Germany) Heilbronner Falken
86	D	Sabahudin Kovačević – A	1.90 m (6 ft 3 in)	95 kg (209 lb)	February 26, 1986 (aged 31)	(Belarus) Yunost Minsk
91	F	Miha Verlič	1.94 m (6 ft 4 in)	85 kg (187 lb)	August 21, 1991 (aged 25)	(Austria) EC VSV
92	F	Anže Kuralt	1.75 m (5 ft 9 in)	80 kg (180 lb)	October 31, 1991 (aged 25)	(France) Brûleurs de Loups

=== Switzerland ===
A 24-player roster was announced on 15 April 2017. A new 29-player roster was revealed on 22 April 2017. The final roster was set on 2 May 2017.

Head coach: Patrick Fischer

No.	Pos.	Name	Height	Weight	Birthdate	Team
1	G	Jonas Hiller	1.87 m (6 ft 2 in)	87 kg (192 lb)	February 12, 1982 (aged 35)	(Switzerland) EHC Biel
8	F	Vincent Praplan	1.81 m (5 ft 11 in)	84 kg (185 lb)	June 10, 1994 (aged 22)	(Switzerland) EHC Kloten
9	F	Thomas Rüfenacht	1.80 m (5 ft 11 in)	85 kg (187 lb)	February 22, 1985 (aged 32)	(Switzerland) SC Bern
10	F	Andres Ambühl – A	1.76 m (5 ft 9 in)	82 kg (181 lb)	September 14, 1983 (aged 33)	(Switzerland) HC Davos
16	D	Raphael Diaz – C	1.81 m (5 ft 11 in)	88 kg (194 lb)	January 9, 1986 (aged 31)	(Switzerland) EV Zug
19	F	Reto Schäppi	1.93 m (6 ft 4 in)	94 kg (207 lb)	January 27, 1991 (aged 26)	(Switzerland) ZSC Lions
23	F	Simon Bodenmann	1.78 m (5 ft 10 in)	83 kg (183 lb)	March 2, 1988 (aged 29)	(Switzerland) SC Bern
24	F	Reto Suri	1.83 m (6 ft 0 in)	84 kg (185 lb)	March 25, 1989 (aged 28)	(Switzerland) EV Zug
26	G	Niklas Schlegel	1.78 m (5 ft 10 in)	66 kg (146 lb)	August 3, 1994 (aged 22)	(Switzerland) ZSC Lions
27	D	Dominik Schlumpf	1.82 m (6 ft 0 in)	79 kg (174 lb)	March 3, 1991 (aged 26)	(Switzerland) EV Zug
34	D	Dean Kukan	1.87 m (6 ft 2 in)	90 kg (200 lb)	July 8, 1993 (aged 23)	(United States) Columbus Blue Jackets
44	F	Pius Suter	1.80 m (5 ft 11 in)	80 kg (180 lb)	May 24, 1996 (aged 20)	(Switzerland) ZSC Lions
53	D	Christian Marti	1.90 m (6 ft 3 in)	95 kg (209 lb)	March 29, 1993 (aged 24)	(Switzerland) ZSC Lions
54	D	Philippe Furrer – A	1.86 m (6 ft 1 in)	92 kg (203 lb)	June 16, 1985 (aged 31)	(Switzerland) HC Lugano
55	D	Romain Loeffel	1.76 m (5 ft 9 in)	81 kg (179 lb)	March 10, 1991 (aged 26)	(Switzerland) Genève-Servette HC
61	F	Fabrice Herzog	1.89 m (6 ft 2 in)	87 kg (192 lb)	December 9, 1994 (aged 22)	(Switzerland) ZSC Lions
62	F	Denis Malgin	1.75 m (5 ft 9 in)	80 kg (180 lb)	January 18, 1997 (aged 20)	(United States) Florida Panthers
63	G	Leonardo Genoni	1.80 m (5 ft 11 in)	80 kg (180 lb)	August 28, 1987 (aged 29)	(Switzerland) SC Bern
65	D	Ramon Untersander	1.83 m (6 ft 0 in)	88 kg (194 lb)	January 21, 1991 (aged 26)	(Switzerland) SC Bern
70	F	Denis Hollenstein	1.83 m (6 ft 0 in)	88 kg (194 lb)	October 15, 1989 (aged 27)	(Switzerland) EHC Kloten
71	F	Tanner Richard	1.82 m (6 ft 0 in)	88 kg (194 lb)	April 6, 1993 (aged 24)	(United States) Syracuse Crunch
76	D	Joël Genazzi	1.85 m (6 ft 1 in)	90 kg (200 lb)	February 10, 1988 (aged 29)	(Switzerland) Lausanne HC
89	F	Cody Almond	1.88 m (6 ft 2 in)	90 kg (200 lb)	July 24, 1989 (aged 27)	(Switzerland) Genève-Servette HC
92	F	Gaëtan Haas	1.81 m (5 ft 11 in)	80 kg (180 lb)	January 31, 1992 (aged 25)	(Switzerland) SC Bern
96	F	Damien Brunner	1.80 m (5 ft 11 in)	85 kg (187 lb)	March 9, 1986 (aged 31)	(Switzerland) HC Lugano
