= Charles Ramsay Trophy =

Award in ice hockey

The Charles Ramsay Trophy (French: Trophée Charles Ramsay) has been awarded since 1978 to the top scorer in the Ligue Magnus. It is named after American player Charles Ramsay, a French league star in the 1930s, and the captain of the first United States World Championship squad.

== Winners ==
Year	Player	Team	Goals	Assists	Points
2025/26	Christophe Boivin	Brûleurs de Loups de Grenoble	22	40	62
2024/25	Brady Shaw	Ducs d'Angers	36	24	60
2023/24	Alexandre Lavoie	Brûleurs de Loups de Grenoble	15	42	57
2022/23	François Beauchemin	Dragons de Rouen	27	50	77
2021/22	Damien Fleury	Brûleurs de Loups de Grenoble	31	38	69
2020/21	Nicolas Deschamps	Dragons de Rouen	10	19	29
2019/20	Alex Aleardi	Brûleurs de Loups de Grenoble	26	37	63
2018/19	Guillaume Leclerc	Brûleurs de Loups de Grenoble	29	32	61
2017/18	Alexandre Giroux	Brûleurs de Loups de Grenoble	25	33	58
2016/17	Samuel Takac	Lyon Hockey Club	24	37	61
2015/16	Maxime Lacroix	Ducs d'Angers	22	25	47
2014/15	Julien Desrosiers	Dragons de Rouen	9	38	47
2013/14	Danick Bouchard	HC Amiens Somme	24	27	51
2012/13	Francis Guérette-Charland	Chamonix Hockey Club	30	17	47
2011/12	Martin Gascon	Ducs de Dijon	15	44	59
2010/11	Carl Mallette	Dragons de Rouen	25	32	57
2009/10	Jonathan Bellemare	Ducs d'Angers	18	43	61
2008/09	Jean-François Dufour	Diables Rouges de Briançon	18	40	58
2007/08	Marc-André Thinel	Dragons de Rouen	24	37	61
2006/07	Marc-André Thinel	Dragons de Rouen	21	35	56
2005/06	Carl Mallette	Dragons de Rouen	29	31	60
2004/05	Steven Reinprecht	Scorpions de Mulhouse	20	27	47
2003/04	François Rozenthal	Gothiques d'Amiens	22	18	40
2002/03	Éric Doucet	Dragons de Rouen	38	44	82
2001/02	Guillaume Besse	Dragons de Rouen	34	24	58
2000/01	Juha Jokiharju	Dragons de Rouen	20	41	61
1999/00	Juha Jokiharju	Gothiques d'Amiens	20	39	59
1998/99	Josef Podlaha	Brûleurs de Loups de Grenoble	29	36	65
1997/98	Éric Pinard	Dragons de Rouen	44	35	79
1996/97	Franck Pajonkowski	Dragons de Rouen	37	38	75
1995/96	Franck Pajonkowski	Dragons de Rouen	37	21	58
1994/95	Guy Fournier	Dragons de Rouen	28	31	59
1993/94	Franck Pajonkowski	Dragons de Rouen	50	54	104
1992/93	Claude Verret	Dragons de Rouen	40	43	83
1991/92	Guy Fournier	Dragons de Rouen	33	31	64
1990/91	Franck Pajonkowski	Dragons de Rouen	38	50	88
1989/90	Jean-François Sauvé	Association des sports de glace de Tours	43	62	105
1988/89	André Côté	Diables Rouges de Briançon	35	69	104
1987/88	Marc Gervais	Ours de Villard-de-Lans	50	36	86
1986/87	Guy Fournier	Viry-Châtillon Essonne Hockey	64	46	110
1985/86	Guy Fournier	Viry-Châtillon Essonne Hockey	46	42	88
1984/85	Franck Pajonkowski	Club des Sports de Megève	42	42	84
1983/84	Roland Cloutier	Gap Hockey Club	47	33	80
1982/83	Luc Tardif	Chamonix Hockey Club	57	42	99
1981/82	Roland Cloutier	Association des Sports de Glace de Tours	27	28	55
1980/81	Luc Tardif	Chamonix Hockey Club	41	29	70
1979/80	Luc Tardif	Chamonix Hockey Club	44	22	66
1978/79	Luc Tardif	Chamonix Hockey Club	41	25	66
1977/78	Guy Dupuis	Ours de Villard-de-Lans	33	20	53
