= Match des Champions =

- Sport: Ice hockey
- Founded: 2007
- Folded: 2017
- Country: France
- Most titles: Dragons de Rouen (4); Brûleurs de Loups de Grenoble (4)
- Website: www.hockeyfrance.com

The Match des Champions, is an ice hockey competition in France. The competition organized by the Fédération Française de Hockey sur Glace.

== Previous winners ==
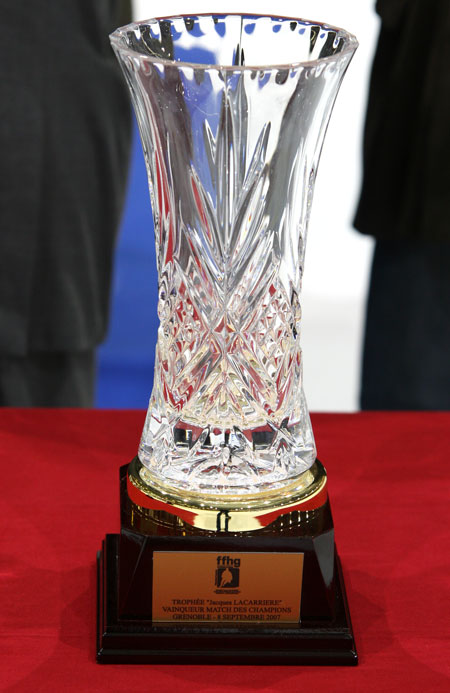
The winning team received the Trophée Jacques-Lacarrière

Year	Winner	Finalist	Score	Place
2007	Ducs d'Angers	Brûleurs de Loups de Grenoble	3-2 O.T.	Pôle Sud, Grenoble
2008	Brûleurs de Loups de Grenoble	Dragons de Rouen	3-1	Pôle Sud, Grenoble
2009	Brûleurs de Loups de Grenoble	Diables Rouges de Briançon	1-0	Illberg, Mulhouse
2010	Dragons de Rouen	Ducs d'Angers	3-2	Patinoire Île Lacroix, Rouen
2011	Brûleurs de Loups de Grenoble	Dragons de Rouen	6-1	Patinoire de Chambéry Métropole, Chambéry
2012	Dragons de Rouen	Ducs de Dijon	3-1	Patinoire Glisséo, Cholet
2013	Diables Rouges de Briançon	Dragons de Rouen	4-2	Rinkla Stadium, Brest
2014	Ducs d'Angers	Diables Rouges de Briançon	4-1	Patinoire du Haras, Angers
2015	Dragons de Rouen	Rapaces de Gap	4-2	Alp'Arena, Gap
2016	Dragons de Rouen	Rapaces de Gap	3-2 OT	Patinoire Île Lacroix, Rouen
2017	Brûleurs de Loups de Grenoble	Rapaces de Gap	6-4	Alp'Arena, Gap
