= Luc Tardif Jr. =

French ice hockey player

Luc Tardif, Jr.
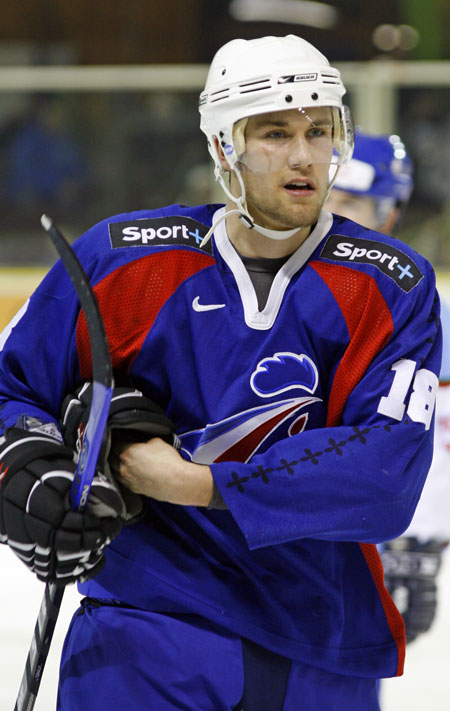
- Born: 30 November 1984 (age 41) Rouen, France
- Height: 6 ft 4 in (193 cm)
- Weight: 223 lb (101 kg; 15 st 13 lb)
- Position: Forward
- Shot: Left
- Played for: Dragons de Rouen; Scorpions de Mulhouse; Ours de Villard-de-Lans; Pingouins de Morzine-Avoriaz; Brûleurs de Loups
- Current FFHG Division 1 coach: Spartiates de Marseille
- National team: France
- Playing career: 2001–2016

Luc Tardif Jr. (born 30 November 1984) is a French ice hockey coach, and former professional player. He is the head coach and general manager for Spartiates de Marseille of the French FFHG Division 1. Tardif is the son of International Ice Hockey Federation president Luc Tardif. A product of the French ice hockey system, Tardif is also a citizen of Canada, his father's country of birth.

== Playing career ==
Tardif has played in the top level league of France, the Ligue Magnus, for Mulhouse in 2003–2004, Villard-de-Lans in 2004–2007, Morzine-Avoriaz in 2007–2009, and Rouen in 2009–2011, winning the Coupe Magnus twice (2010 and 2011). He was picked up by the ECHL's Florida Everblades for the 2011–12 season, where he sustained a season-ending injury on 22 December 2011. The team released him to Grenoble, with whom he signed a two-year contract, on 27 April 2012.

== International play ==
Tardif participated in the IIHF World Championships in 2007, 2008, 2009, 2010 and 2014 as a member of the French national team.

== Personal life ==
Tardif is the son of Luc Tardif, a former professional ice hockey player, former president of the French Ice Hockey Federation and the current president of the International Ice Hockey Federation. He is one of three children of the senior Tardif, and is the brother-in-law of Jonathan Zwikel.
