= Coupe de la Ligue (ice hockey) =

French ice hockey competition

- Sport: Ice hockey
- Founded: 2006
- Folded: 2016
- Country: France
- Most titles: Brûleurs de Loups de Grenoble; Dragons de Rouen (4 titles)
- Website: www.hockeyfrance.com

The Coupe de la Ligue (lit. 'League Cup') was a French ice hockey competition which took place between the 2006–07 and 2015–16 seasons. It was the league cup for Ligue Magnus clubs, and served as the country's secondary cup competition after the Coupe de France.

== History ==
By 2006, France's top tier, the Ligue Magnus, included a few surviving teams from the defunct Ligue Élite (1997–2002), a failed professional circuit that played both mid-week and weekend games, while the majority of its members were former participants in the semi-professional Nationale 1 (second tier), who had been enticed to form a new league with their larger peers, partly based on the promise that the fledgling loop would—at least in the beginning—keep the cheaper, weekend-based schedule they used to operate on.

As such, the Ligue Magnus initially represented a drop in intensity, which the French Ice Hockey Federation was intent on remedying without alienating its more budget-conscious constituents. This led to a transitional period, where the governing body kept regular season games at a relative minimum (26) to preserve the semi-professional model demanded by some clubs, while adding potential cup and playoff games to provide more competitive and revenue opportunities to those who wanted them. The creation of the Coupe de la Ligue was such an initiative.

In 2016, French federation president Luc Tardif announced that, despite the continued reluctance of some structurally or financially challenged clubs, he would enact the long-delayed switch of the regular season to a 44-game, three-game-a-week schedule, which was needed to keep in touch with accepted international standards. As part of the move, the Coupe de la Ligue was phased out.

== Formula ==
For its first two seasons, the Coupe de la Ligue consisted of home-and-home series decided on aggregate score for each round except the final, which consisted of a single game played on neutral ice. From the third to the tenth and final season, the competition started with a round robin phase, where teams were split into four regional groups of four teams each and played each other twice, once at home and once away. The two best teams from each group qualified for the knockout phase, with quarterfinals and semifinals consisting of home-and-home series decided on aggregate score, and the final consisting of a single game played on neutral ice.

For each of the ten seasons, the final was hosted at Méribel Olympic Ice Rink, which hosted the Coupe de France final before 2007, when it moved to Palais omnisports de Paris-Bercy.

The Coupe de la Ligue featured 16 participants. As the Ligue Magnus had 14 clubs at the time, two external teams were included. They were originally the two highest ranked second-tier (now called Division 1) teams based on the previous season's rankings. From the 2010–11 season, one of the two second-tier teams was replaced by the French under 20 national team, as preparation for December's World Junior Championships. However, it was barred from advancing to the elimination phase.

== List of winners ==
Year	Location	Winner	Finalist	Score
2015–16	Olympic Ice Rink, Méribel	Rapaces de Gap	Dragons de Rouen	4–2
2014–15	Olympic Ice Rink, Méribel	Brûleurs de Loups de Grenoble	Dragons de Rouen	3–2
2013–14	Olympic Ice Rink, Méribel	Dragons de Rouen	Chamois de Chamonix	6–4
2012–13	Olympic Ice Rink, Méribel	Dragons de Rouen	Ducs d'Angers	4–3 O.T.
2011–12	Olympic Ice Rink, Méribel	Diables Rouges de Briançon	Pingouins de Morzine-Avoriaz	4–1
2010–11	Olympic Ice Rink, Méribel	Brûleurs de Loups de Grenoble	Diables Rouges de Briançon	4–3 O.T.
2009–10	Olympic Ice Rink, Méribel	Dragons de Rouen	Brûleurs de Loups de Grenoble	6–4
2008–09	Olympic Ice Rink, Méribel	Brûleurs de Loups de Grenoble	Diables Rouges de Briançon	4–3 O.T.
2007–08	Olympic Ice Rink, Méribel	Dragons de Rouen	Diables Rouges de Briançon	4–3 O.T.
2006–07	Olympic Ice Rink, Méribel	Brûleurs de Loups de Grenoble	Dragons de Rouen	2–1
