= Teddy Da Costa =

French professional ice hockey player

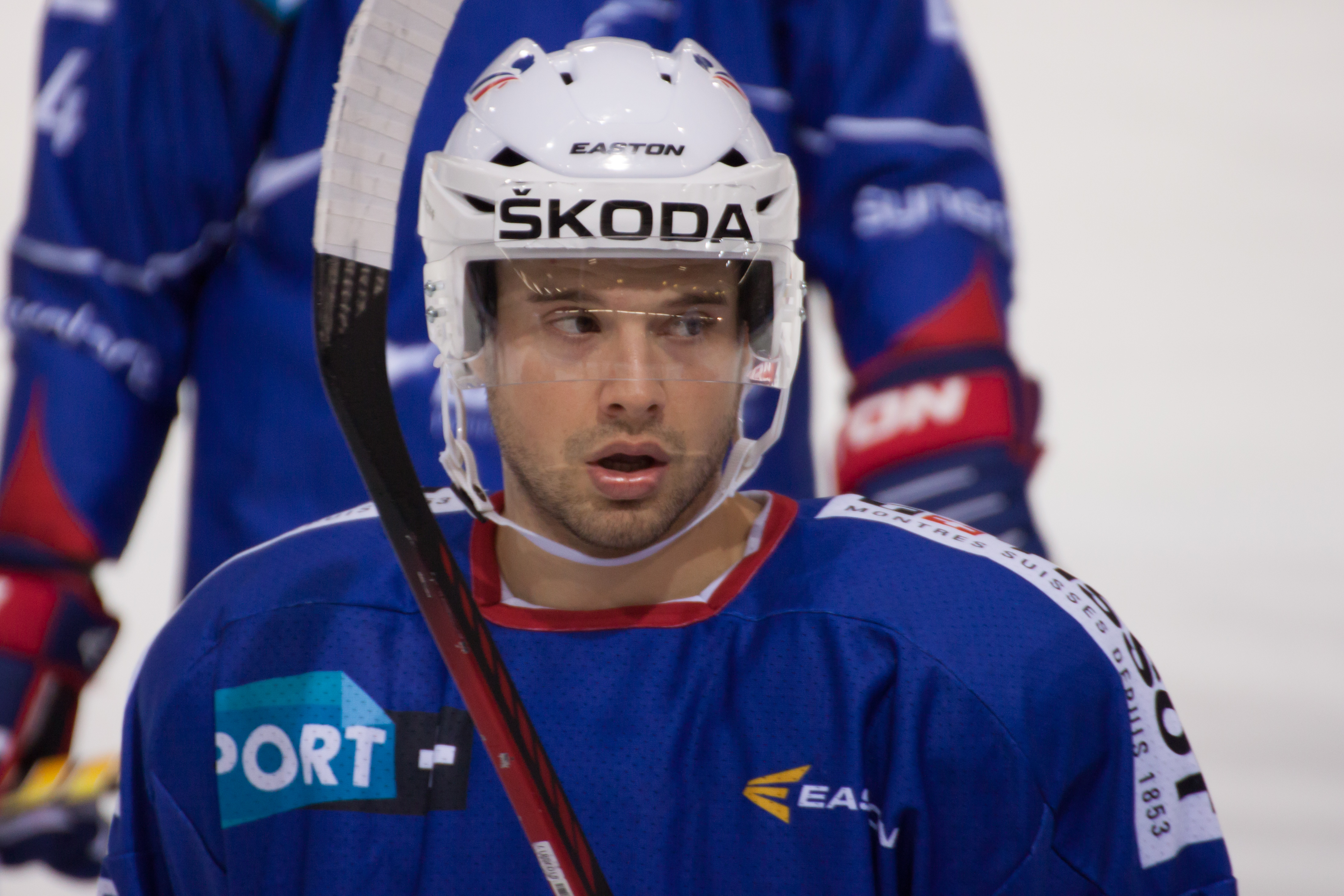
- Born: 17 February 1986 (age 39); Melun, France
- Height: 5 ft 11 in (180 cm)
- Weight: 187 lb (85 kg; 13 st 5 lb)
- Position: Forward
- Shoots: Right
- Ligue Magnus team Former teams: Spartiates de Marseille; Rapaces de Gap; KH Zagłębie Sosnowiec; Dragons de Rouen; GKS Tychy; Tappara; Lahti Pelicans; Sport; Orli Znojmo; KS Cracovia; Brûleurs de Loups; GKS Katowice; Unia Oswiecim
- National team: France
- Playing career: 2005–present

Teddy Da Costa (born 17 February 1986) is a Polish–French professional ice hockey player for the Spartiates de Marseille of the Ligue Magnus and the French national team.

== Playing career ==
Da Costa first played professionally in 2004–05 for the Rapaces de Gap, where he played with his brother Gabriel. He scored eight goals and three assists in 19 games.

The following season, he signed with KH Zagłębie Sosnowiec in the Polska Hokej Liga (PHL), where he would play the next five seasons.

Da Costa returned to France, joining the Dragons de Rouen for the 2010–11 season.

Da Costa returned to Poland to play with GKS Tychy for two seasons.

In 2013, he signed with Hokki of the Mestis, the second-tier league in Finland.

For the 2014–15 season he was signed by Tappara of the SM-liiga, Finland's highest level.

In the 2018–19 season, after playing in Poland the previous year, Da Costa returned to France to join the Brûleurs de Loups of Grenoble, with whom he would win the 2019 Ligue Magnus championship. The club announced in May 2019 that he would not be returning for a second season in Grenoble.

With Unia Oswiecim in 2022, Da Costa reached the PHL finals.

Once again returning to France from Poland, Da Costa was named the captain of the Spartiates de Marseille for the 2022–23 season.

== International play ==
Internationally, Da Costa has played for the France men's national junior ice hockey team in 2005 and 2006. He played for the French men's team in 2011, 2012, and 2013.

Da Costa was once again named to the French squad for the 2014 IIHF World Championship.

== Personal life ==
A native of Melun, France, Da Costa is the son of a Portuguese–French father and Polish mother. His two brothers, Stephane and Gabriel, also played professional hockey, the former in the National Hockey League.
