= Spartiates de Marseille =

- City: Marseille, France
- League: Ligue Magnus; 2023-present
- Founded: 2012
- Home arena: Palais omnisports Marseille Grand-Est
- Colours
- Owner(s): Éric Lagache
- President: Éric Lagache
- Head coach: Luc Tardif Jr.
- Captain: Teddy Da Costa
- Website: www.marseillehockeyclub.com

Franchise history
- 2012–2013: Massilia Hockey Club
- 2013–2017: Massilia Hockey Club; Les Spartiates
- 2017–present: Marseille Hockey Club; Les Spartiates

The Spartiates de Marseille (English: Marseille Spartans), formally known as Marseille Hockey Club, are an ice hockey club based in Marseille, Bouches-du-Rhône, France. The team plays at Palais omnisports Marseille Grand-Est, which is the country's largest permanent ice rink by capacity. The 2023–24 season marked their debut in Ligue Magnus, the highest national level.

== History ==
The club was established in April 2012 under the name Massilia Hockey Club —after Marseille's Latin name— to replace the city's historic Hockey Club Phocéen in the French Division 3 (fourth tier) league, when the latter pulled out of competition due to financial problems.

=== Successive promotions ===
In 2014, France international Luc Tardif Jr. retired from the Ligue Magnus at age 29, following a string of injuries. Having gone through a coaching course during his time away from the ice, Tardif joined Marseille with an eye on a new career behind the bench, although he initially signed on as a player-coach, as the light Division 3 schedule allowed him to continue playing at an acceptable risk for the time being.

The club finished the 2014–15 season as Division 3 runner-up and gained promotion to Division 2. However it found it hard to compete at that level, narrowly avoiding relegation back to Division 3 in 2015–16. In reaction, Tardif retired from playing to focus on coaching full time, and the roster received a major overhaul, with most local players weeded out of the team in favor of recruits from more traditional hockey hotbeds.

In 2017, the organization changed its name from Massilia Hockey Club to Marseille Hockey Club. Meanwhile, a separate company was spun off from the amateur club to oversee the professionalization of its flagship team. Tardif was a founding minority shareholder as was his half-brother Jonathan Zwikel, who was also named president of the new entity. The team's main shareholder was Jean-Claude Menn, a Fribourg, Switzerland-based asset manager.

Despite being eliminated by Toulouse-Blagnac in the quarterfinals of the 2018 Division 2 playoffs, Marseille was promoted to Division 1 as the only team willing to step up on short notice when the folding of Ligue Magnus team Gamyo d'Épinal created a domino effect that freed an additional promotion spot.

=== Division 1 champions ===
Due to COVID-19, the 2020–21 Division 1 season was played under an abridged format, with two regional pools replacing the usual single conference setup, and a final four bringing together the two best teams from each pool in lieu of three-round, best-of-five playoffs.
Marseille finished second in the East pool, before upsetting favorites Nantes and defeating Strasbourg in the final four to claim the Division 1 championship. However, due to the competition's unconventional format, the French Ice Hockey Federation decided not to apply promotions and relegations for the 2020–21 season, forcing the club to compete in Division 1 again for the 2021–22 campaign.

At the start of the 2022–23 season, Éric Lagache, chairman of Marseille-based produce importer Kinobé Group, became the Spartiates' new majority shareholder and president, fulfilling the team's search for a well-heeled local investor. Zwikel remained with the organization as managing director.

=== Ligue Magnus ===
On June 8, 2023, the Spartiates were sanctioned to replace the Scorpions de Mulhouse in the Ligue Magnus. Their application package received a positive evaluation from the French federation's financial control commission, while that of the other candidate, the Corsaires de Nantes, was rejected.

== Current roster ==
Updated 11 November 2024.

No.	Nat	Player	Pos	S/G	Age	Acquired	Birthplace
76	(Finland)	Joni Airo	RW	R	25	2024	Jyväskylä, Finland
10	(Sweden)	Victor Björkung	D	L	32	2024	Stockholm, Sweden
87	(Canada)	Alexandre Boivin	C	L	31	2024	Ottawa, Ontario, Canada
74	(France)	Fabien Bourgeois (A)	D	R	30	2024	Thonon-les-Bains, France
1	(Slovakia)	Marek Čiliak	G	L	35	2023	Zvolen, Czechoslovakia
16	(France)	Fabien Colotti (A)	C	L	29	2023	Saint-Martin-d'Hères, France
17	(France)	Yohan Coulaud	D	L	25	2024	Gap, France
77	(France)	Teddy Da Costa (C)	C	R	39	2023	Melun, France
23	(France)	Flavian Dair	W	L	23	2024	Chambéry, France
65	(France)	Sasha Djigaouri	D	R	23	2023	Saint-Martin-d'Hères, France
44	(Czech Republic)	Jan Dufek	W	L	28	2023	Brno, Czech Republic
33	(France)	Florian Gourdin	G	L	24	2022	Digne-les-Bains, France
12	(France)	Paul Joubert	RW	R	25	2024	Saint-Pierre-et-Miquelon, France
26	(Finland)	Markus Kojo	D	L	31	2024	Noormarkku, Finland
15	(France)	Maxence Leroux	C	R	27	2021	Melun, France
5	(Czech Republic)	Patrik Machač	C	L	31	2023	Beroun, Czech Republic
82	(France)	Colin Morillon	D	R	28	2020	Marseille, France
97	(France)	Noa Nsonsa-Kitala	F	L	18	2024	Mons, Belgium
36	(Finland)	Elias Ruusu	D	L	24	2024	Jyväskylä, Finland
93	(United States)	Matt Salhany	RW	R	33	2024	Warwick, Rhode Island, United States
91	(France)	Paul Siraudin	LW	L	22	2024	Geneva, Switzerland
60	(Sweden)	Stefan Stéen	G	L	33	2024	Sunne, Sweden
71	(Russia)	Gennadi Stolyarov (A)	RW	L	39	2023	Moscow, Russian SFSR, Soviet Union
13	(France)	Maurice Zwikel	D	L	18	2023	Thonon-les-Bains, France

== Trophies and awards ==
- Division 1:
  - (x1) 2021
