= Patrik Machač =

Czech ice hockey player

- Born: April 23, 1994 (age 30); Hýskov, Czech Republic
- Height: 5 ft 10 in (178 cm)
- Weight: 176 lb (80 kg; 12 st 8 lb)
- Position: Centre
- Shoots: Left
- Magnus team Former teams: Spartiates de Marseille; Rytíři Kladno
- NHL draft: Undrafted
- Playing career: 2011–present

Patrik Machač (born April 23, 1994) is a Czech professional ice hockey player. He is currently playing for Spartiates de Marseille of the Ligue Magnus (France).

Machač previously spent his entire professional career with Rytíři Kladno of the Czech Extraliga. He made his debut playing with Kladno during the 2013–14 Czech Extraliga season.
