= Gennady Stolyarov =

Russian ice hockey player (born 1986)

- Born: 20 August 1986 (age 40) Moscow, Soviet Union
- Height: 6 ft 4 in (193 cm)
- Weight: 187 lb (85 kg; 13 st 5 lb)
- Position: Right wing
- Shot: Left
- KHL team Former teams: Dinamo Riga; Dynamo Moscow; Barys Astana; HC MVD; Severstal Cherepovets; Torpedo Nizhny Novgorod; CSKA Moscow; Neftekhimik Nizhnekamsk; HC Vityaz; Spartak Moscow; HC Sparta Prague; Spartiates de Marseille
- Current KHL coach: HC Dynamo Moscow
- NHL draft: 257th overall, 2004; Detroit Red Wings
- Playing career: 2003–2025
- Coaching career: 2025–present

Gennady Stolyarov (born 20 August 1986) is a Russian professional ice hockey right winger, coach.

Gennady ended his playing career. Since August 20, 2025, he has been a coach at the HC Dynamo Moscow.

Stolyarov was a late round selection by the Detroit Red Wings in the 2004 NHL entry draft. The young forward was a break-out young player during the 2006–2007 season, delivering a strong performance in the Russian Super League with HC Dynamo Moscow. He also spent the 2007–08 season with HC Dynamo.

== Career statistics ==
			Regular season					Playoffs
Season	Team	League	GP	G	A	Pts	PIM	GP	G	A	Pts	PIM
2002–03	Dynamo–2 Moscow	RUS.3	19	4	4	8	4	—	—	—	—	—
2003–04	Dynamo–2 Moscow	RUS.3	20	11	2	13	6	—	—	—	—	—
2003–04	THK Tver	RUS.2	24	3	1	4	4	—	—	—	—	—
2004–05	Vityaz Chekhov	RUS.2	25	0	1	1	2	—	—	—	—	—
2004–05	Vityaz–2 Chekhov	RUS.3	4	3	7	10	2	—	—	—	—	—
2005–06	Kapitan Stupino	RUS.2	17	3	5	8	20	—	—	—	—	—
2005–06	Dynamo Moscow	RSL	12	0	0	0	4	3	0	1	1	0
2006–07	Dynamo Moscow	RSL	37	6	3	9	39	2	0	0	0	0
2006–07	Dynamo–2 Moscow	RUS.3	4	4	3	7	0	—	—	—	—	—
2007–08	Dynamo Moscow	RSL	37	3	3	6	22	8	1	0	1	2
2008–09	Dynamo Moscow	KHL	3	0	0	0	4	—	—	—	—	—
2008–09	Barys Astana	KHL	41	12	9	21	24	3	0	0	0	4
2009–10	HC MVD	KHL	1	0	0	0	0	15	0	3	3	4
2010–11	Dynamo Moscow	KHL	20	2	4	6	23	—	—	—	—	—
2011–12	Severstal Cherepovets	KHL	41	5	9	14	32	6	1	1	2	0
2012–13	Severstal Cherepovets	KHL	42	5	5	10	38	10	1	5	6	4
2013–14	Severstal Cherepovets	KHL	27	4	6	10	81	—	—	—	—	—
2014–15	Severstal Cherepovets	KHL	35	5	13	18	32	—	—	—	—	—
2014–15	Torpedo Nizhny Novgorod	KHL	18	2	4	6	12	5	0	1	1	2
2015–16	CSKA Moscow	KHL	43	6	6	12	49	12	0	1	1	14
2016–17	CSKA Moscow	KHL	17	0	2	2	13	—	—	—	—	—
2016–17	Neftekhimik Nizhnekamsk	KHL	32	5	15	20	12	—	—	—	—	—
2017–18	Torpedo Nizhny Novgorod	KHL	54	9	8	17	67	3	0	0	0	8
2018–19	Vityaz Podolsk	KHL	59	5	10	15	19	4	0	0	0	2
2019–20	Spartak Moscow	KHL	44	0	3	3	24	—	—	—	—	—
2020–21	Dinamo Rīga	KHL	34	5	4	9	8	—	—	—	—	—
2021–22	HC Merano	AlpsHL	18	8	11	19	10	—	—	—	—	—
2021–22	HC Sparta Praha	ELH	12	0	2	2	29	7	1	0	1	31
RSL totals			86	9	6	15	65	13	1	1	2	2
KHL totals			511	65	98	163	438	58	2	11	13	38
