= Luc Tardif =

French ice hockey executive and player (born 1953)

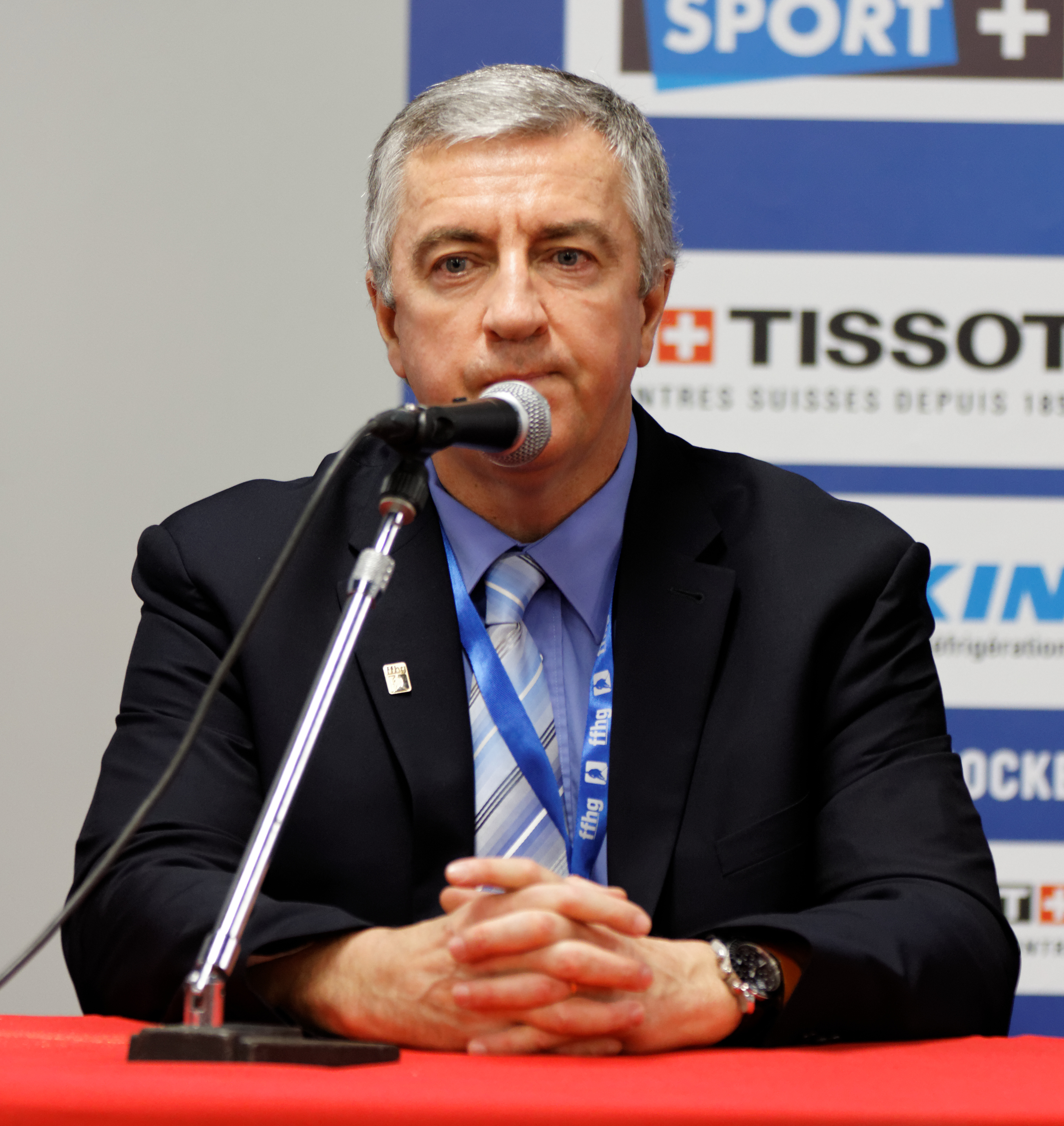
- Tardif in 2013
- Born: 29 March 1953 (age 73); Trois-Rivières, Quebec, Canada
- Education: Université du Québec à Trois-Rivières
- Occupation: Sales engineer
- Known for: International Ice Hockey Federation president, French Ice Hockey Federation president
- Children: 3, incl. Luc Tardif Jr.
Ice hockey career
- Height: 183 cm (6 ft 0 in)
- Weight: 75 kg (165 lb; 11 st 11 lb)
- Position: Centre
- Played for: Brussels Royal IHSC; Chamonix HC; Dragons de Rouen; Drakkars de Caen
- NHL draft: Undrafted
- Playing career: 1975–1990

Luc Tardif (born 29 March 1953) is a Canadian-born French former ice hockey executive and professional player. A native of Trois-Rivières, he played junior ice hockey in Quebec, then was an all-star player for the Université du Québec à Trois-Rivières. During his professional career, he became a naturalized citizen of France, won two Nationale A League titles, and won the Charles Ramsay Trophy four times with Chamonix HC as the league's top scorer. Later in his career, he was a player-coach for the Dragons de Rouen, then served as the team's vice-president and oversaw the youth hockey program.

Tardif served as head of the hockey for the French Ice Sports Federation from 2000 to 2006, then negotiated to establish the French Ice Hockey Federation (FFHG) as an independent body. As the inaugural president of the FFHG from 2006 to 2021, he imposed a salary cap to prevent teams from filing for bankruptcy; oversaw expansion and upgrades of arenas in the Ligue Magnus, and relocation of the French Cup final to Paris to increase its attendance. He led fundraising to open the Aren'Ice as a national training facility in 2016, and the transition of Ligue Magnus teams from sports associations into teams with a professional structure. He also served with the French National Olympic and Sports Committee as the head of mission for France at the Olympics during the 2014 and 2018 Winter Games, and promoted the 2024 Summer Olympics bid for Paris.

Tardif was elected to the International Ice Hockey Federation (IIHF) council in 2010, appointed its treasurer in 2012, then became its finance committee chairman in 2016. As president of the IIHF from 2021 to 2026, he sought to make it a non-political body, and to fight doping in sport and racism. He desired to combine Division 1 at the Ice Hockey World Championships to have a larger event, to encourage top-tier coaches to teach in developing countries, and to expand three-on-three ice hockey targeted at youths. He also sought for the National Hockey League to allow its players to participate in ice hockey at the Olympic Games, and to co-ordinate schedules for the Kontinental Hockey League and other European leagues to benefit players attending the Olympics.

== Early life ==
Luc Tardif was born on 29 March 1953, in Trois-Rivières, Quebec, Canada. He began playing ice hockey in Canada at age three.

== Playing career ==
=== Amateur ===
Tardif played as a centreman in hockey. He played junior ice hockey with the Cap-de-la-Madeleine Barons in the Quebec Junior A Hockey League (QJAHL) during the 1971–72 and 1972–73 seasons, and participated in eight games as a guest player with the Trois-Rivières Ducs in the Quebec Major Junior Hockey League. He was described by Le Nouvelliste as "possibly the most talented centre to come out of the area since René Robert", but did not stay with the Ducs due to his academic commitments and lack of physical play. He finished the 1972–73 season as the top scorer and most valuable player in the east division of the QJAHL.

Tardif declined offers to play NCAA Division I ice hockey, and instead attended the Université du Québec à Trois-Rivières (UQTR) and played two seasons of Canadian Interuniversity Athletics Union hockey for the UQTR Patriotes. He was named a Quebec Universities Athletic Association conference all-star in the 1973–74 and 1974–75 seasons, and led the conference in goals scored during his first season. He also earned an invitation to training camp for the Toronto Maple Leafs in 1974. While playing on an all-star team of players from universities in Quebec, he was noticed by a European scout in a game versus the Czechoslovakia national team, and was invited to play professionally.

=== Professional ===
Tardif moved to Europe to play two seasons in the Belgian Hockey League with the Brussels Royal IHSC, where he led the 1975 Dutch Cup in goals scored. After his Brussels team placed last overall in the 1976 Dutch Cup, it withdrew from the Dutch league.

Tardif had planned on returning to Trois-Rivières after two seasons in Belgium, until a former teammate from UQTR recommended him to Chamonix HC who sought to fill their vacancy for a foreign-born player. Tardif played in the Nationale A League with Chamonix for seven seasons from 1977–78 to 1983–84, and referred to his time in Chamonix as "the best period of my hockey career", until "the injuries started to slow me down". He won the Charles Ramsay Trophy as the league's top scorer four times in five seasons from 1979 to 1983. He missed the 1981–82 season with a knee injury and was replaced by Rick Bourbonnais. In the early 1980s, Tardif became a naturalized citizen of France (a frequent move among foreign players at the time) in order to get around the league's stringent one-import rule, and to improve his post hockey career prospects. He won the first of two Nationale A League titles when he led Chamonix HC to its final championship in 1979.

Tardif later played five seasons with the Dragons de Rouen from 1984–85 to 1987–88, and again for the 1989–90 season. He also played for the Drakkars de Caen in the FFHG Division 1 during the 1988–89 season. In 1984, Tardif was recruited by Rouen to achieve promotion to the Nationale A League. He helped Rouen win its first Nationale A League title in 1990, then retired. He served as Rouen's player-coach for several seasons, was briefly the team's vice-president, and oversaw the youth hockey program at Rouen during his spare time.

== Sports executive career ==
=== French Ice Hockey Federation ===
In 2000, Tardif was called to the French Ice Sports Federation (FFSG) – the national governing body of all skating sports at the time – by its president Didier Gailhaguet, but their relationship quickly soured over the degree of autonomy afforded to hockey. Tardif served as the head of the hockey department at the FFSG from 2000 to 2006. In 2005, he liaised with Monique Scheier-Schneider of Tornado Luxembourg to allow the team to play in the French Division 3.

Tardif negotiated the separation of French hockey from the FFSG to establish the French Ice Hockey Federation (FFHG), with the support of IIHF president René Fasel. Tardif served as the inaugural president of the independent FFHG from 2006 to 2021. During his tenure with the FFHG, Tardif imposed a salary cap to prevent teams from filing for bankruptcy, and oversaw investments into expansion and upgrades of arenas in the Ligue Magnus. He also implemented a control commission for financial transparency, since multiple teams had filed for bankruptcy during the 1990s.

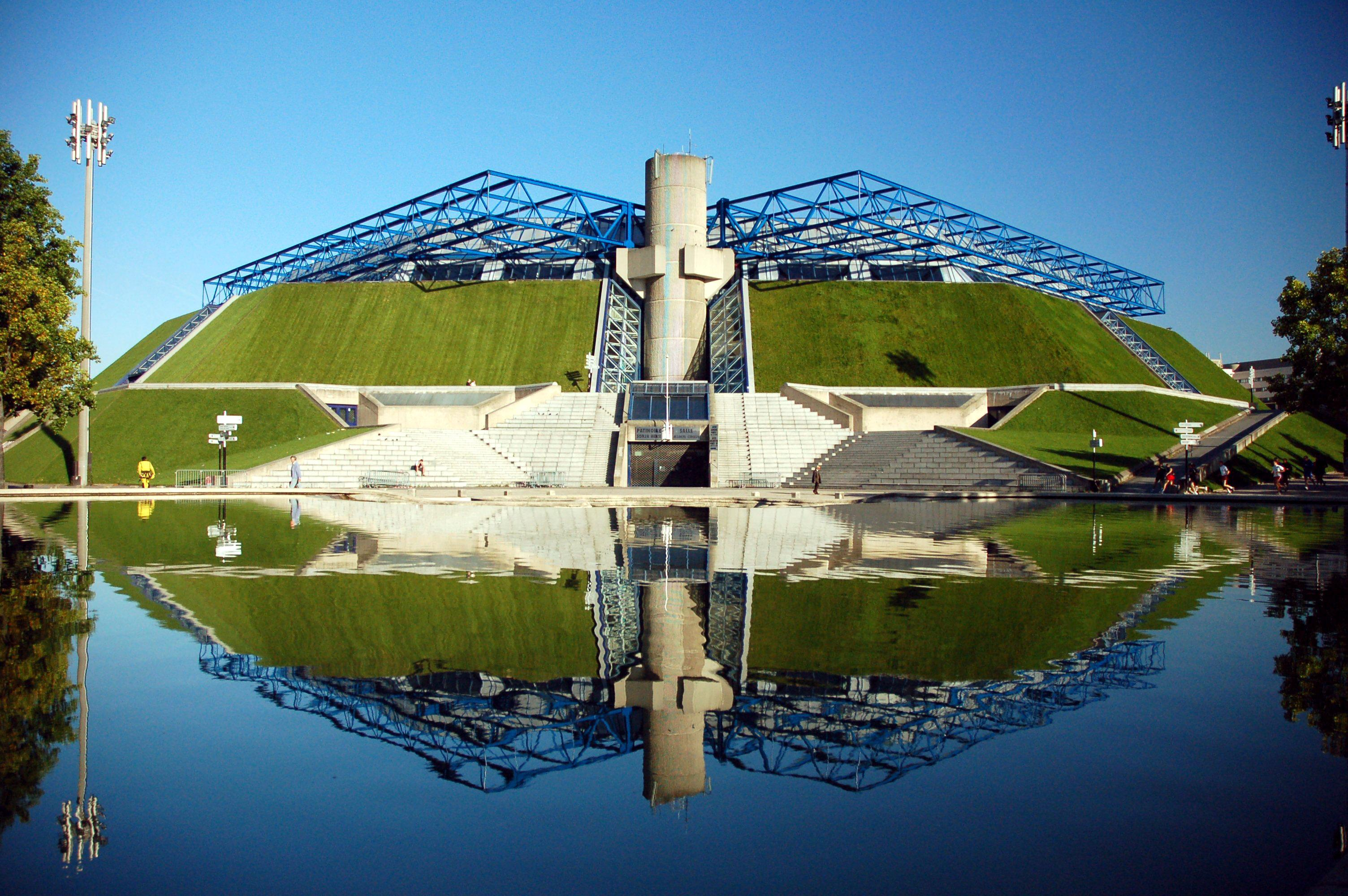
Palais ominisport de Paris-Bercy

In 2007, the French Cup final was moved to the Palais ominisport de Paris-Bercy, where the event saw an increase in attendance at the largest indoor venue in Paris. He later led the campaign to raise financing for a national training facility, Aren'Ice. It opened in 2016 in Cergy, and serves as the home ice for the Jokers de Cergy-Pontoise in the Ligue Magnus. During the 2016 French Cup final, Tardif met with Ligue Magnus executives to reduce the number of teams in the league, and to reorganize and transition the teams from a sports association into a professional hockey team structure. He also negotiated a television contract for the league with L'Équipe 21.

Tardif retired as president of the FFHG in 2021, and was succeeded by its vice-president, Pierre-Yves Gerbeau.

=== French international sports ===
Tardif was the event manager at Club France, the French house of the 2010 Olympic Village in Vancouver. He was subsequently chosen by the French National Olympic and Sports Committee (CNOSF) as the head of mission for France at the Olympics during the 2014 and 2018 Winter Games. He was elected to the CNOSF's administrative council in 2021. Together with its president Brigitte Henriques, Tardif was named co-chair of the Olympic Commission, an organ of the CNOSF that oversees matters pertaining directly to the Olympic Games. He was also a member of the French International Sports Committee (Comité Français du Sport International), and charged with promoting Paris' bid for the 2024 Summer Olympics.

=== International Ice Hockey Federation ===
Tardif joined the IIHF in 2008, as a member of the competition committee. He was elected to the IIHF Council in 2010. He was appointed treasurer of the IIHF in 2012, graduating to the position of finance committee chairman in 2016. He oversaw the 2021 World Junior Ice Hockey Championships hosted in Edmonton, on behalf of the IIHF.

Tardif was a late addition to the 2021 IIHF presidential race to succeed René Fasel. After four rounds of voting, Tardif received support from the North American delegates, and defeated German Ice Hockey Federation president Franz Reindl, who was considered the favourite and was supported by the Russian federation. Tardif was elected to a five-year mandate as the fourteenth president of the IIHF, and became the first representative of France to hold the position since the inaugural president, Louis Magnus.

Tardif stated his desire for the IIHF to resume activities halted due to the COVID-19 pandemic, to combine Division 1A and Division 1B at the Ice Hockey World Championships to have a larger event, and to encourage top-tier coaches to teach in developing countries. He campaigned for president with the goals of fighting doping in sport and racism, and to make the IIHF a non-political body. He also stated a desire to make hockey a universal sport similar to soccer or basketball, and the research and development would be key components of growth. He stated that expanding the IIHF's three-on-three ice hockey program was a priority, and targeting it to youth. He felt that co-ordination of schedules for the Kontinental Hockey League and other European leagues would benefit the players in Olympic years. He also sought for the National Hockey League to allow its players to participate in ice hockey at the 2022 Winter Olympics, and for the Olympics in China to encourage more players to participate in hockey across Asia.

Choosing not to seek another term as IIHF president, he was succeeded by Franz Reindl in 2026.

== Personal life ==
During the late 1980s, Tardif studied to become a sales engineer in the construction business, and had previously worked as a real estate agent. He was hired by Quille, the Grand-Ouest branch of the construction firm Bouygues, and ascended to be the director of sales for the company. He oversaw and developed tenders for public and private building works, including his former Rouen team's new ice rink.

Tardif has multiple citizenship including France and Canada. He met his Belgian wife Dalila during his second season playing in Europe. As of 2015, he has been married for 35 years, resides in Rouen, and has two daughters and one son. His son Luc Tardif Jr. was a professional hockey player. Tardif is also the father-in-law to hockey player Jonathan Zwikel.

Preceded by René Fasel	President of the IIHF; 2021–2026	Succeeded by Franz Reindl
