= Guy Dupuis (ice hockey, born 1957) =

French ice hockey player

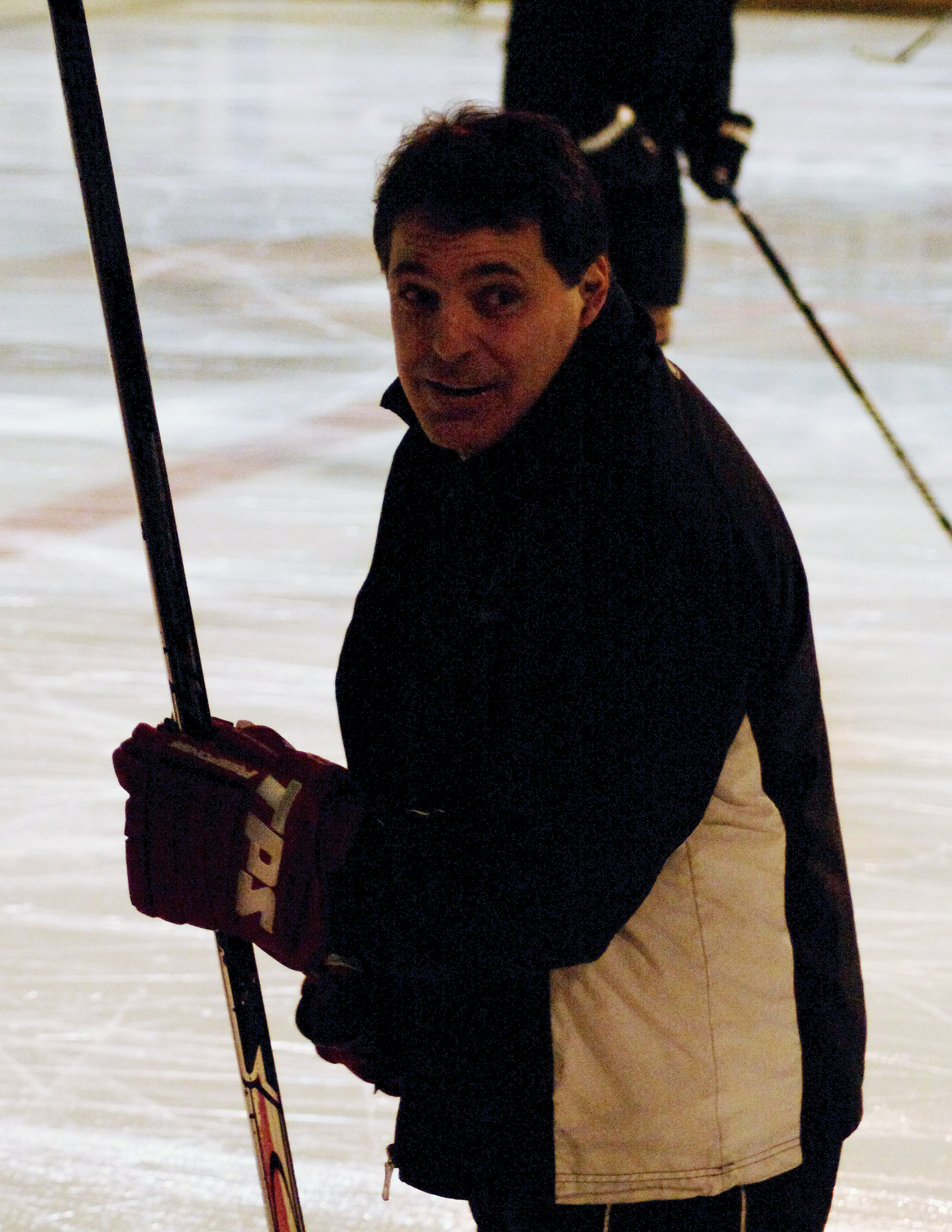
- Guy Dupuis in 2013

Personal information
- Nationality: French
- Born: 4 September 1957 (age 67); Longueuil, Quebec, Canada

Sport
- Sport: Ice hockey

Guy Dupuis (born 4 September 1957) is a French former ice hockey player. He competed in the men's tournament at the 1988 Winter Olympics for France.
