= Franck Pajonkowski =

French ice hockey player

Personal information
- Nationality: French
- Born: 21 January 1964 (age 61) Douai, France

Sport
- Sport: Ice hockey

Franck Pajonkowski (born 21 January 1964) is a French ice hockey player. He competed in the men's tournaments at the 1988 Winter Olympics and the 1994 Winter Olympics.
