= Loïc Lampérier =

French ice hockey player

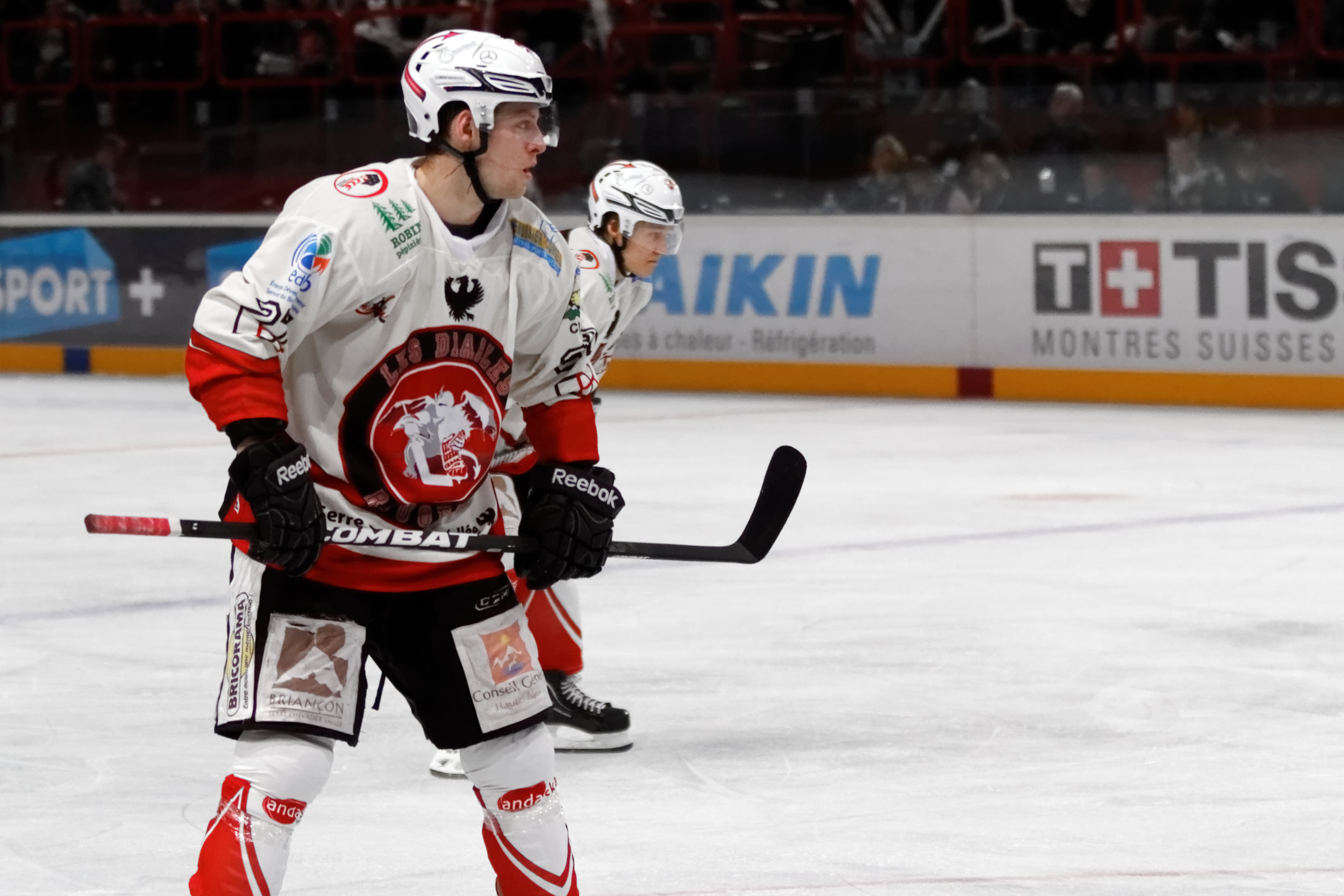
- Born: August 7, 1989 (age 36) Mont-Saint-Aignan, France
- Height: 6 ft 2 in (188 cm)
- Weight: 198 lb (90 kg; 14 st 2 lb)
- Position: Forward
- Shoots: Left
- Magnus team Former teams: Dragons de Rouen; Diables Rouges de Briançon
- National team: France
- Playing career: 2007–present

Loïc Lampérier (born August 7, 1989) is a professional French ice hockey player who currently plays for Dragons de Rouen of the Ligue Magnus. He participated in the 2010 IIHF World Championship as a member of the France National men's ice hockey team.

He won the Jean-Pierre Graff Trophy in 2011.
