= Florian Chakiachvili =

French ice hockey player (born 1992)

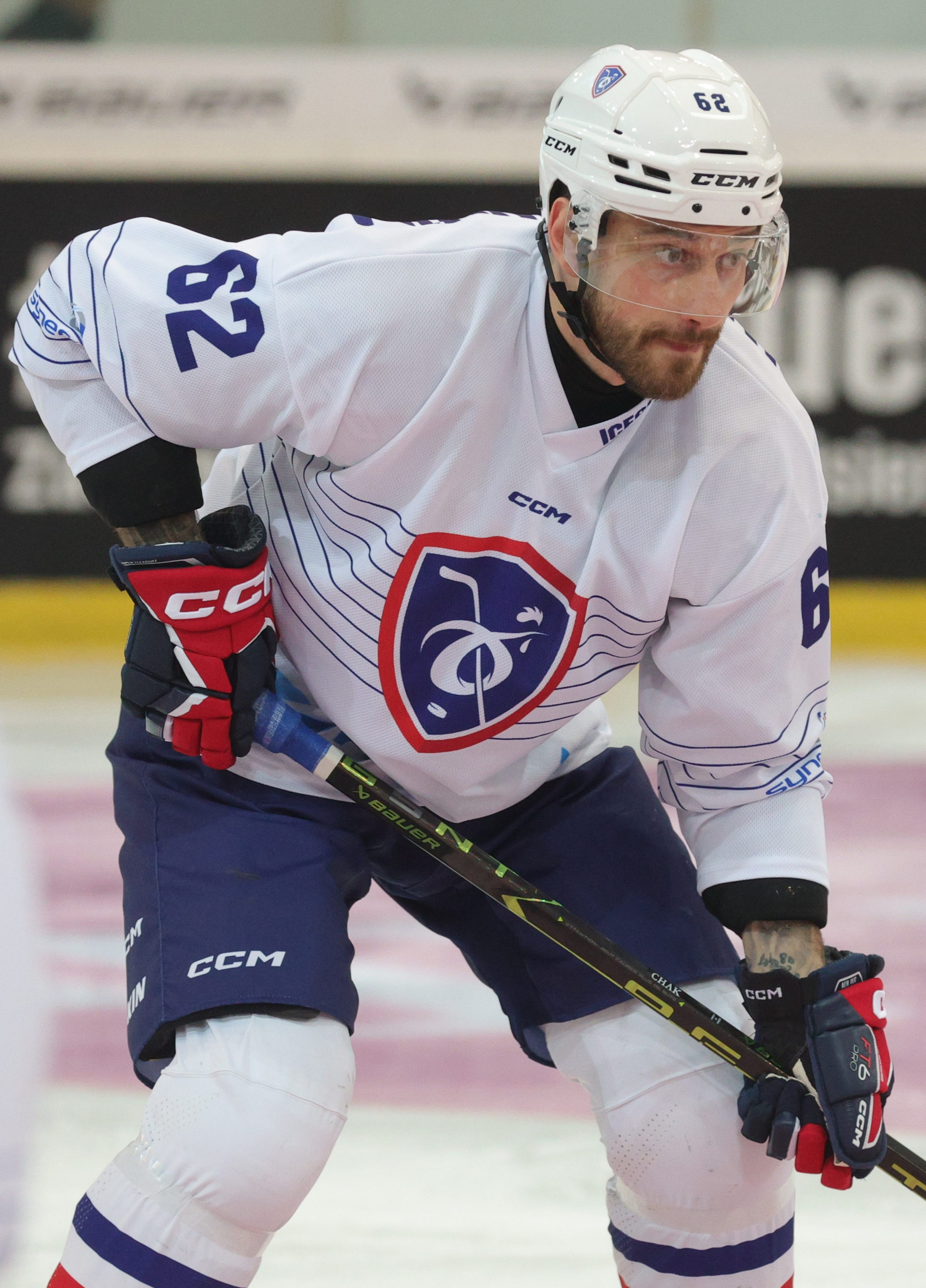
- Chakiachvili with France in 2024
- Born: 18 March 1992 (age 34) Briançon, France
- Height: 6 ft 1 in (185 cm)
- Weight: 192 lb (87 kg; 13 st 10 lb)
- Position: Defence
- Shoots: Left
- Magnus team Former teams: Diables Rouges de Briançon; Dragons de Rouen
- National team: France
- NHL draft: Undrafted
- Playing career: 2010–present

Florian Chakiachvili (born 18 March 1992) is a French professional ice hockey player who is a defenceman for Diables Rouges de Briançon of the Ligue Magnus.

== International play ==
Chakiachvili represented the France national team at the 2026 Winter Olympics and the 2014 IIHF World Championship.
