= Centre sportif Guy-Boissière =

Multisports complex in Rouen, France

Coordinates: 49.4305°N 1.1040°E

Centre sportif Guy-Boissiere
- Interactive map of Centre sportif Guy-Boissiere
- Address: Avenue Jacques Chastellain
- Location: Rouen
- Owner: Métropole Rouen Normandie
- Acreage: 9948 m^{2} (original)

Centre sportif Guy-Boissière (English: Guy Boissière Sports Center) is a multisports complex in Rouen, Seine-Maritime, France. It consists of an ice rink and a swimming pool.
The complex was originally known as Centre sportif du Docteur Duchêne, after Doctor Auguste Duchêne (1905 – 1967), a former deputy mayor and president of FC Rouen. In 2006, it was renamed after Guy Boissière (1929 – 2005), a coach for the French national swimming team between 1960 and 1991, and France's 1986 All-Sports Coach of the Year. It is also referred to as Piscine-patinoire de l'île Lacroix (English: Île Lacroix Pool and Ice Rink), after the Seine island it was built on.

Its main ice surface, officially known as Patinoire Nathalie-Péchalat, is the home of ice hockey team Dragons de Rouen and the annual French Cup of synchronized skating.

== Ice rink ==
Ice rink at Centre sportif Guy-Boissière
- Patinoire du Centre sportif Guy-Boissière
- Interactive map of Ice rink at Centre sportif Guy-Boissière
- Capacity: 3,279
- Executive suites: 14
- Field size: 60 × 30 metre (Patinoire olympique Natalie-Péchalat); 56 × 26 metre (Patinoire Édith-Ballester)

Construction
- Opened: 14 January 1992
- Renovated: 2019–20
- Expanded: 2020
- Architects: Artefact; Groupe 3 Architectes (1992 building); Octant Architecture (2020 extension)
- Main contractors: Sogea (1992 building); Eiffage (2020 extension)

Tenants
- Dragons de Rouen (Ligue Magnus) (1992–present)

=== 1971 version ===
The complex's original ice rink was designed by Atelier d'architecture et d'urbanisme de la Bretèque (ATAUB), a multinational firm with offices in metro Rouen. It was inaugurated on 27 December 1971. It replaced a temporary facility built nearby for a 1967 trade fair, and kept in operation by popular demand. The new rink should have opened in late 1970, but burned down in an accidental fire before it was even finished, and had to be rebuilt.
The venue was at the center of a minor controversy in 1986, when the IIHF selected it to host the B-Pool World Junior Championships despite its 56 × 26 metre playing surface, which is below international standards. The Italian Ice Sports Federation protested the decision—to no avail.
While it only offered 920 seats, reports from the building's later years indicate that around 3,000 people could be crammed inside for important games. Following the Dragons' first national title in 1990, Rouen mayor Jean Lecanuet promised them a new home, to be erected on the same grounds as the original. The team played in Le Havre during the rebuild.

=== 1992 version ===
The new ice arena opened on 14 January 1992. It is a dual ice facility, with the first surface measuring 60 × 30 metre and the second measuring 56 × 26 metre. The building remained largely the same until 2019, with the exception of a €2.35 million refresh in 2010, which was limited to the playing area and refrigeration system, and partially mandated by European environmental law.

In 2012, a multipurpose venue called Kindarena was built in the eastern part of Rouen. However, the city wanted to avoid the costs associated with conversions between basketball and hockey, and it was not designed for the latter. Lower ranked basketball team Rouen Métropole SPO was designated as its main tenant, which was the source of some controversy. Instead, the city and the Dragons started negotiations on an extension to the existing ice rink. The process was limited by the proximity of the river Seine, which necessitated the use of a slightly cantilevered design.

The 700 m^{2} southern extension only allowed a modest seating capacity increase from 2,747 to 3,029, with extra standing room for a total of 3,279 patrons. But its main revenue driver was the addition of six executive suites (to the existing eight) and a corporate lounge. The roof was also redone to accommodate a suspended video scoreboard, which the previous framework could not support. The extension was accompanied by a remodel of the locker rooms and a general refurbishment of the venue. The project was supported by a broad majority in local political assemblies, and carried out in 2019–20 at a cost of €9.2 million.

In May 2021, the ice rink's Olympic surface took the name of former ice dancer and French Ice Sports Federation president Nathalie Péchalat, while the training surface took that of French synchronized skating pioneer Édith Ballester. The move was part of an initiative from the city's new political majority to primarily name or rename public buildings after women in order to improve female representation in the public space.

== Swimming pool ==
The aquatic center was the first part of the complex to open, and was inaugurated on 2 May 1970. Like the original ice rink, it was designed by ATAUB.

The indoor section has a distinctive concave roof and features an eight-lane, 25-metre indoor pool, as well as a teaching pool. The outdoor pool is 50 metre long and offers ten lanes. It is home to the Vikings, a swim club founded in 1935, which has counted Stéphane Caron and Fabien Gilot among its members.

The pool took the name of longtime Vikings and Team France coach Guy Boissière in May 2006, as did the entire sports center. Later that year, it underwent a €2.7 million overhaul by Agence Lemarié, and an outdoor diving pool was closed and backfilled.

Between 2001 and 2012, the center hosted a swim meet, the Arena Sprint, sponsored by the eponymous swimwear brand. The event attempted to innovate by integrating rock concerts, unusual race formats and apnea record attempts to the experience. It attracted stars like Alexander Popov and Alain Bernard. By 2013 however, an increasingly crowded international calendar had made such big names harder to come by, and the event was cancelled.
