= French Ice Hockey Federation =

Sport regulating body in France

France
- Association name: Fédération française de hockey sur glace
- IIHF Code: FRA
- IIHF membership: October 20, 1908
- President: Pierre-Yves Gerbeau
- IIHF men's ranking: 14 (▼1) (26 May 2025)
- IIHF women's ranking: 14 (▼2) (21 April 2025)

The French Ice Hockey Federation (French: Fédération française de hockey sur glace (FFHG)) is the governing body of ice hockey in France, as recognized by the International Ice Hockey Federation (IIHF). It was founded in 2006 after separation with the Fédération française des sports de glace (English: French Ice Sports Federation).
For the first ten years, the federation had its offices in Issy-les-Moulineaux, Hauts-de-Seine. In 2016, it moved to a new national training center in Cergy, Val-d'Oise. It manages both the amateur and professional games in France, as well as the national teams on junior and senior levels. France is a founding member of the IIHF.

Luc Tardif served as the inaugural president of the federation from its inception in 2006 to 2021. Upon his election as president of the IIHF, he was succeeded by Pierre-Yves Gerbeau.

== National teams ==
- France men's national ice hockey team
- France men's national junior ice hockey team
- France men's national under-18 ice hockey team
- France women's national ice hockey team
- France women's national under-18 ice hockey team

== See also ==
- France women's ice hockey league
- Ligue Magnus
- Coupe de France (ice hockey)
- Coupe de la Ligue (ice hockey)
- Match des Champions
