= Rapaces de Gap =

- Nickname: Rapaces
- City: Gap, France
- League: Ligue Magnus; 1962–Present
- Founded: 1937
- Home arena: Patinoire Brown-Ferrand (capacity: 3400)
- Colors
- President: Georges Obninsky
- Head coach: Patrick Turcotte
- Captain: Romain Moussier
- Website: lesrapacesdegap.fr

Franchise history
- 1937–45: Ski-Club Gapençais (SCG)
- 1945–89: Gap Hockey Club (GHC)
- 1989-00: Gap Alpes Patinage (HGAP)
- 2000–present: Les Rapaces de Gap

Rapaces de Gap (French: Les Rapaces de Gap, "Gap Raptors") is a French ice hockey team that is based in Gap and plays home games at the Patinoire Brown-Ferrand. The team played in the Ligue Magnus during the 2009–10 Ligue Magnus season. Gap won the French Championship three times in 1977, 1978 and 2015.

== History ==
=== 20th century ===
The team was founded in 1937 The club Rapaces de Gap (Gapençais, Gap) was created in 1937; it entered championship of France in 1945 where it played in the second series. In 1955, the team inaugurated the Brown-Ferrand Ice Rink, which became artificial in 1961. The Gapençais started in the first series (elite division) for the 1962–1963 season. From 1962, the Canadian Camil Gélinas, who was coach of the team Athletic Club of Boulogne-Billancourt, became coach of Repaces de Gap at the request of the team's president in 1965. In 1972, work on the stadium, which included covering of the track, allowed the permanent use of the ice, and the hosting of the world championship group C.

The senior team was still progressing with Czech Zdeněk Bláha as a coach. The team under Bláha won their first Champion of France title in 1977. Gap also won the title the following year. The club continued thereafter to be a great training club, until the 1980s winning 21 titles of champion of France in the minor categories and being vice-champion of France in 1983–1984. In 1989, the club finished second-from-last in the National 1A but preferred demotion to end their expensive professional adventure.

For the 1992–1993 French Hockey Championship, Gap returned to the elite division for the first time, following a reshuffle of the divisions and the retirement from the national league at 10 clubs. In 1996, Gap won Division 1. New immediate descent, when Gap fails to stay in hen.

=== 21st century ===
The club slowly descended the French hierarchy, having to play a dam to stay in Division 1 during the 2001–2002 season. The club recovered their form the next season, thanks to the expansion of the elite to a Super 16. This was a difficult task because with the lowest budget, Gap were often in the bottom of the table, returning to the second level in 2006. In 2009, thanks to a new title Division 1 champion, the club returned to the elite league.

Between the start of the 2009–2010 season and the end of the 2012–2013 season, Gap home games were broadcast live on the club's website. Long announced the renovation of the rink would run until August 2012. The rink was refurbished and its capacity was increased to 2,000 seats. During the 2011–2012 season, Gap played their home games at Palais Marseille Grand Est. On October 23, 2012, the club's president Georges Obninsky announced his resignation during a press conference. He was replaced by Philippe Vial and Jérôme Escallier. At the end of the 2016–2017 season, Rapaces de Gap won the Ligue Magnus, thus becoming Champions of France for the fourth time in their history. As of 2019, the club has one of the best records in French hockey with 29 national titles, 37 podiums, 2 participations in the European Cup, 1 cup of As and 22 players selected in National Team including eight for Olympics.

== Roster ==
Updated 9 November 2024.

No.	Nat	Player	Pos	S/G	Age	Acquired	Birthplace
51	(France)	Maurin Bouvet	C	L	30	2024	Amiens, France
9	(Canada)	Jaxon Camp	D	R	26	2024	Ottawa, Ontario, Canada
20	(France)	Raphaël Chauvel	C	L	21	2023	Amiens, France
6	(France)	Loris Chauvin	D	L	21	2023	Gap, France
23	(France)	Lucas Colombin	RW	R	23	2024	Sallanches, France
77	(France)	Julien Correia (A)	F	L	38	2019	Rouen, France
72	(France)	Loïc Coulaud (A)	RW	R	28	2022	Gap, France
73	(Czech Republic)	Jan Dalecký	RW	R	35	2024	Louny, Czechoslovakia
29	(France)	Léo Faure	D	L	21	2022	Briançon, France
34	(France)	Antoine Gilbert	G	L	24	2024	Amiens, France
82	(France)	Romain Gutierrez (C)	C	L	33	2017	Domont, France
28	(United States)	Kyle Hallbauer	D	R	28	2024	Howell, New Jersey, United States
52	(Hungary)	Bálint Horváth	C	L	26	2024	Győr, Hungary
46	(Finland)	Antti Karjalainen	G	L	30	2024	Sotkamo, Finland
7	(United States)	Chad Langlais	D	L	39	2020	Seattle, Washington, United States
60	(Finland)	Julius Marva	D	L	30	2024	Rauma, Finland
91	(Latvia)	Artūrs Mickēvičs	RW	R	35	2024	Talsi, Latvia
22	(France)	Paul Nassivet	D	L	22	2023	Angers, France
85	(France)	Sébastien Rohat	C	R	40	2021	Briançon, France
11	(Canada)	Brayden Sherbinin (A)	D	L	32	2024	Kelowna, British Columbia, Canada
15	(France)	Axel Tarabusi	C	L	24	2022	Gap, France
47	(France)	Dimitri Thillet	C	L	32	2024	Briançon, France

== Awards and trophies ==
- Coupe Magnus: 1977, 1978, 2015, 2017
- Division 1: 1996, 2006
- Coupe de la Ligue: 2016
- Coupe des As: 1986
- U22 : 5 championships
- U18 : 7 championships
- U16 : 7 championships
- U14 : 4 championships
- U11 : 3 championships
- Women's National Championship: 1 championship

== Famous players ==
- (Canada) Roland Cloutier
- (Canada) Alain Daigle
- (Canada) Larry Huras
- (France) Christian Pouget
- (Russia) Vadim Sharifijanov
- (Canada) Pat Daley
- (Canada) Rane Carnegie
- (France) Ronan Quemener

=== NHL Players ===
Name	Nationality	Game in NHL	Period
Alain Daigle	(Canada)	406 games	1980–1981
Vadim Sharifijanov	(Russia)	96 games	2004–2005
Roland Cloutier	(Canada)	34 gamess	1983–1988
Pat Daley	(Canada) (France)	12 games	1987–1988
Larry Huras	(Canada)	2 games	1984–1988
