= Dragons de Rouen =

- Nickname: Dragons
- City: Rouen, France
- League: Ligue Magnus; 1985–Present
- Founded: 1982
- Home arena: Centre sportif Guy-Boissière (capacity: 2747)
- Colours
- President: Thierry Chaix
- General manager: Guy Fournier
- Head coach: Fabrice Lhenry
- Captain: Loïc Lampérier
- Affiliates: Dragons de Rouen II
- Website: Les Dragons

Franchise history
- Rouen Hockey Élite 76: Rouen Hockey Élite (1996-07); Rouen Hockey Club (1982–96)

Old logo

The Dragons de Rouen (Rouen Dragons) are a French professional ice hockey team based in Rouen playing in the Ligue Magnus.

The team was founded in 1982 and plays home games at the Île Lacroix.

== History ==
Only 3 years after its founding, the club, then named RHC (Rouen Hockey Club), reached the French elite championship in 1985. It has remained at this level since, being the club with the second-most consecutive years at this level, behind Amiens.

Rouen won its first French league title in 1990, starting a run of 7 consecutive finals with 5 league titles, winning the title in 1990 and 1992 through 1995, while finishing runner-up in 1991 and 1996. During that era, the club enjoyed much success, participating in European tournaments, and winning the European League Cup in 1996, and the Atlantic league in 1995 and 1996. The dragons also won 13 Ligue magnus championships.

Rouen had less success in the second half of the 1990s, but since then has returned to its winning ways. The team won 12 additional French league titles: 2001, 2003, 2006, 2008, 2010 through 2013, 2016, 2018, 2021, 2023 and 2024. During the 2005–2006 season, the team achieved the rare feat of being unbeaten, winning all of their regular season matches except for one tie, and sweeping their opponents in the playoffs.

With 18 titles, Rouen has the second-most elite championship titles of any French city, trailing only Chamonix (30 titles) and Paris (18 tied), although Paris won its titles with 8 different teams.

== Roster ==
Updated 15 February 2025.

| No. | Nat | Player | Pos | S/G | Age | Acquired | Birthplace |
|---|---|---|---|---|---|---|---|
| 7 | (France) | Johanès Avonde | F | R | 22 | 2024 | Mont-Saint-Aignan, France |
| 9 | (Sweden) | Sebastian Bengtsson | LW | L | 31 | 2024 | Stockholm, Sweden |
| – | (France) | Thomas Boisson | F | L | 21 | 2024 | Sallanches, France |
| 41 | (France) | Enzo Cantagallo | D | R | 27 | 2018 | Grenoble, France |
| 62 | (France) | Florian Chakiachvili (A) | D | L | 34 | 2015 | Briançon, France |
| 10 | (France) | Robin Colomban | C | L | 28 | 2024 | Briançon, France |
| 15 | (Canada) | Jared Dmytriw | RW | R | 27 | 2024 | Craven, Saskatchewan, Canada |
| 23 | (Sweden) | Daniel Glad | D | L | 33 | 2024 | Jönköping, Sweden |
| 16 | (France) | Noa Goncalves-Nivelais | D | R | 21 | 2023 | Saint-Martin-d'Hères, France |
| 17 | (France) | Jordan Hervé | F | L | 22 | 2021 | Sèvres, France |
| 19 | (Slovakia) | Milan Kytnár | C | L | 36 | 2023 | Topoľčany, Czechoslovakia |
| 80 | (Slovakia) | Jakub Lackovič | G | L | 26 | 2024 | Bratislava, Slovakia |
| 27 | (France) | Loïc Lampérier (C) | LW | L | 36 | 2013 | Mont-Saint-Aignan, France |
| 12 | (France) | Paul Le Lem | F | L | 19 | 2024 | Nantes, France |
| 66 | (Sweden) | Alexander Lindelöf | D | L | 29 | 2024 | Västerås, Sweden |
| 8 | (Canada) | Guillaume Naud | D | R | 33 | 2024 | Augsburg, Germany |
| 6 | (France) | Vincent Nesa | C | R | 29 | 2015 | Saint-Cyr-l'Ecole, France |
| 2 | (France) | Matteo Perdrix | D | L | 20 | 2023 | Ecully, France |
| 11 | (France) | Tommy Perret | RW | R | 22 | 2021 | Saint-Martin-d'Hères, France |
| 72 | (Canada) | Francis Perron | LW | L | 30 | 2023 | Laval, Quebec, Canada |
| 18 | (France) | Anthony Rech | LW | L | 33 | 2023 | Sallanches, France |
| 38 | (France) | Gaëtan Richard | G | L | 27 | 2024 | Briançon, France |
| 32 | (Finland) | Oskari Setänen | G | L | 32 | 2024 | Eura, Finland |
| 21 | (France) | Thomas Simonsen | RW | R | 23 | 2024 | Neuilly-sur-Seine, France |
| 36 | (Finland) | Juho Tommila | D | R | 33 | 2024 | Lappi, Finland |
| 91 | (Latvia) | Rolands Vīgners | LW | L | 35 | 2020 | Riga, Latvia |
| 3 | (France) | Fiorenzo Villard | D | L | 21 | 2024 | Mont-Saint-Aignan, France |
| 8 | (Canada) | Dylan Yeo (A) | D | L | 39 | 2021 | Prince Albert, Saskatchewan, Canada |

== Trophies and awards ==
France

– Ligue Magnus (French Championship): 1990, 1992, 1993, 1994, 1995, 2001, 2003, 2006, 2008, 2010, 2011, 2012, 2013, 2016, 2018, 2021, 2023, 2024

– French Cup: 2002, 2004, 2005, 2011, 2015, 2016

– League Cup: 2008, 2010, 2013, 2014

Europe

– Cup of European Leagues: 1996

– Atlantic league: 1995, 1996

– IIHF Continental Cup: 2012, 2016

== Notable players ==
- Luc Tardif
