= 2015 World Junior Ice Hockey Championships – Division I =

International ice hockey tournament

2015 IIHF U20 World Championship Division I

Tournament details
- Host countries: Italy; Hungary
- Venues: 2 (in 2 host cities)
- Dates: 14–20 December 2014
- Teams: 12

The 2015 World Junior Ice Hockey Championship Division I was a pair of international under-20 ice hockey tournaments organized by the International Ice Hockey Federation. In each of the two groups, six teams played a round-robin tournament; the first-placed team was promoted to a higher level, while the last-placed team was relegated to a lower level. Divisions I A and I B represent the second and third tier of the World Junior Ice Hockey Championships.

The winners of Division I A, Belarus, were promoted to the 2016 Top Division and the winners of Division I B, Kazakhstan, were promoted to the 2016 Division I A.

== Division I A ==
The Division I A tournament was played in Asiago, Italy, from 14 to 20 December 2014.

=== Participating teams ===
Team	Qualification
Norway	placed 10th in Top Division last year and were relegated
Latvia	placed 2nd in Division I A last year
Belarus	placed 3rd in Division I A last year
Austria	placed 4th in Division I A last year
Slovenia	placed 5th in Division I A last year
Italy	hosts; placed 1st in Division I B last year and were promoted

=== Final standings ===
Pos	Team	Pld	W	OTW	OTL	L	GF	GA	GD	Pts	Promotion or relegation
1	Belarus	5	4	1	0	0	22	9	+13	14	Promoted to the 2016 Top Division
2	Norway	5	2	2	0	1	16	11	+5	10	
3	Latvia	5	2	0	1	2	15	11	+4	7	
4	Italy (H)	5	1	1	0	3	16	22	−6	5	
5	Austria	5	1	0	2	2	21	27	−6	5	
6	Slovenia	5	1	0	1	3	17	27	−10	4	Relegated to the 2016 Division I B

Source: IIHF
(H) Host

=== Match results ===
All times are local (Central European Time – UTC+1).

14 December 2014; 13:30	Slovenia	1–6 (0–3, 1–1, 0–2)	Belarus	Pala Odegar, Asiago; Attendance: 300

Game reference

Zan Us
Goalies
Konstantin Kozlovski
Referee:
(Czech Republic) Robin Sir
Linesmen:
(Italy) Christian Cristeli
(Denmark) Henrik Haurum

	0–1	06:22 – A. Shantyka (D. Ambrozheichik, K. Khenkel) (PP)
	0–2	07:06 – A. Buinitski (D. Ambrozheichik, V. Martsul)
	0–3	12:26 – A. Buinitski (S. Stankevich)
T. Kalan (K. Cepon, N. Pem) (PP) – 22:12	1–3
	1–4	28:23 – D. Ambrozheichik (R. Dyukov, Y. Kudin)
	1–5	46:11 – M. Valkov (D. Gerasimovich)
	1–6	55:28 – D. Ambrozheichik (A. Buinitski, D. Buinitski)

8 min
Penalties
6 min
13
Shots
38

14 December 2014; 17:00	Austria	1–5 (1–1, 0–0, 0–4)	Latvia	Pala Odegar, Asiago; Attendance: 550

Game reference

Stefan Muller
Goalies
Matiss Kivlenieks
Referee:
(Germany) Marcus Brill
Linesmen:
(Japan) Kenji Kosaka
(Italy) Simone Lega

	0–1	10:39 – M. Dzierkals (R. Abols, J. Jaks)
M. Huber (S. Bauer, I. Schaurhofer) – 17:37	1–1
	1–2	44:15 – R. Locans (O. Batna, K. Rubins)
	1–3	49:28 – R. Balcers (E. Homjakovs, F. Razgals)
	1–4	52:33 – E. Homjakovs (O. Batna, F. Razgals)
	1–5	54:52 – R. Abols (R. Maslovskis, H. Egle)

16 min
Penalties
14 min
22
Shots
37

14 December 2014; 20:30	Italy	0–3 (0–1, 0–2, 0–0)	Norway	Pala Odegar, Asiago; Attendance: 860

Game reference

Daniel Morandell
Goalies
Frederick Gronstrand
Referee:
(United Kingdom) Michael Hicks
Linesmen:
(United Kingdom) James Kavanagh
(Poland) Mariusz Smura

0–1	18:25 – M. Norstebo (M. Soberg) (EA)
0–2	26:59 – M. Ronnild (C. Kaasastul, A. Klavestad) (PP)
0–3	36:20 – A. Henriksen (O.P. Overgaard, L. Hoff) (PP)

39 min
Penalties
4 min
11
Shots
38

15 December 2014; 13:30	Norway	9–5 (3–2, 3–1, 3–2)	Austria	Pala Odegar, Asiago; Attendance: 300

Game reference

Frederick Gronstrand
Goalies
Thomas Stroj
Stefan Muller
Referee:
(Czech Republic) Robin Sir
Linesmen:
(Poland) Mariusz Smura
(Italy) Christian Cristeli

	0–1	04:44 – M. Huber (R. Gelfanov, F. Baltram) (PP)
M. Soberg (L. Hoff) – 04:56	1–1
	1–2	06:58 – S. Gaffal (PP)
M. Soberg (E. Sateraas, L. Hoff) – 11:03	2–2
L. Hoff (P. Gronstad, A. Klavestad) – 18:50	3–2
L. Hoff (A. Henriksen, A. Klavestad) (PP) – 20:36	4–2
T. Olsen (M. Ronnild) (SH) – 27:18	5–2
	5–3	28:34 – M. Richter (L. Haudum) (PP)
M. Norstebo (E. Sateraas, L. Hoff) (PP2) – 32:17	6–3
	6–4	41:16 – D. Winkler (M. Richter, S. Bauer)
M. Norstebo (L. Hoff, M. Soberg) (PP) – 50:53	7–4
M. Henriksen (A. Henriksen, C. Olsen) – 53:14	8–4
	8–5	54:52 – S. Gaffal (M. Reisinger)
M. Norstebo (M. Soberg, L. Hoff) (PP) – 58:36	9–5

10 min
Penalties
26 min
40
Shots
15

15 December 2014; 17:00	Latvia	7–3 (1–1, 3–2, 3–0)	Slovenia	Pala Odegar, Asiago; Attendance: 150

Game reference

Matiss Kivlenieks
Mareks Mitens
Goalies
Tomaz Trelc
Referee:
(Germany) Marcus Brill
Linesmen:
(Finland) Markus Hagerstrom
(Italy) Simone Lega

R. Balcers (F. Razgals, E. Homjakovs) – 09:20	1–0
	1–1	14:45 – Z. Jezovsek (T. Ograjensek)
	1–2	22:52 – L. Maver (M. Jeklic, G. Glavic)
K. Cukste (K. Rubins, M. Dzierkals) (PP) – 23:29	2–2
R. Abols (H. Egle, R. Maslovskis) – 26:10	3–2
R. Locans (M. Dzierkals) (PP) – 27:01	4–2
	4–3	34:26 – L. Vincec (N. Unuk, K. Potocnik)
E. Homjakovs (R. Grinbergs, R. Maslovskis) – 43:27	5–3
J. Jaks (H. Egle, E. Homjakovs) – 47:40	6–3
O. Batna (R. Locans, K. Cukste) – 56:09	7–3

8 min
Penalties
12 min
40
Shots
20

15 December 2014; 20:30	Belarus	4–2 (2–0, 1–1, 1–1)	Italy	Pala Odegar, Asiago; Attendance: 450

Game reference

Maxim Gorodetski
Goalies
Daniel Morandell
Referee:
(Finland) Jari-pekka Pajula
Linesmen:
(Denmark) Henrik Haurum
(Japan) Kenji Kosaka

V. Novik (SH) – 07:46	1–0
D. Ambrozheichik (K. Khenkel) (PP) – 10:35	2–0
A. Buinitski (D. Ambrozheichik, N. Ustinenko) (PP) – 27:00	3–0
	3–1	36:29 – I. Tauferer (A. Lambacher)
	3–2	50:42 – G. Morini
N. Logvinyuk (N. Ustinenko) (PP) – 56:31	4–2

6 min
Penalties
6 min
33
Shots
21

17 December 2014; 12:00	Latvia	1–2 (0–1, 0–0, 1–1)	Belarus	Pala Odegar, Asiago; Attendance: 350

Game reference

Matiss Kivlenieks
Goalies
Konstantin Kozlovski
Referee:
(Finland) Jari-pekka Pajula
Linesmen:
(United Kingdom) James Kavanagh
(Italy) Simone Lega

	0–1	02:49 – A. Shantyka (I. Varivonchik, K. Khenkel) (PP2)
R. Maslovskis (R. Abols) – 46:52	1–1
	1–2	57:28 – A. Buinitski (D. Ambrozheichik, N. Ustinenko) (PP)

8 min
Penalties
10 min
19
Shots
30

17 December 2014; 17:00	Norway	2–1 GWS (0–0, 1–0, 0–1) (OT: 0–0) (SO: 2–1)	Slovenia	Pala Odegar, Asiago; Attendance: 400

Game reference
Theodor Hestnes	Goalies	Zan Us	Referee: (United Kingdom) Michael Hicks; Linesmen: (Italy) Christian Criteli (Denmark) Henrik Haurum
O.P. Overgaard (M. Norstebo, T. Hestnes) (PP) – 30:10 / 1–0; / 1–1 / 59:07 – M. Logar (S. Hadzic, A. Jeklic) (EA)			Referee: (United Kingdom) Michael Hicks; Linesmen: (Italy) Christian Criteli (Denmark) Henrik Haurum
L. Hoff; M. Soberg	Shootout	(miss) M. Logar; N. Simsic; (miss) N. Pem	Referee: (United Kingdom) Michael Hicks; Linesmen: (Italy) Christian Criteli (Denmark) Henrik Haurum
12 min	Penalties	6 min	Referee: (United Kingdom) Michael Hicks; Linesmen: (Italy) Christian Criteli (Denmark) Henrik Haurum
38	Shots	25	Referee: (United Kingdom) Michael Hicks; Linesmen: (Italy) Christian Criteli (Denmark) Henrik Haurum

17 December 2014; 20:30	Italy	5–4 OT (0–1, 1–3, 3–0) (OT: 1–0)	Austria	Pala Odegar, Asiago; Attendance: 900

Game reference

Daniel Morandell
Goalies
Stefan Muller
Referee:
(Germany) Marcus Brill
Linesmen:
(Finland) Markus Hagerstrom
(Poland) Mariusz Smura

	0–1	16:06 – M. Richter (T. Vallant, L. Haudum)
	0–2	25:39 – P. Lindner (M. Huber, M. Richter)
	0–3	25:48 – A. Wukovits (D. Jakubitzka, M. Reisinger)
A. Lambacher (J. Ramoser, P. Beber) – 31:39	1–3
	1–4	39:39 – M. Richter (M. Huber)
R. Lacedelli (M. Cordiano, D. Costa) (PP) – 47:39	2–4
P. Morini (M. Ploner, G. Morini) – 50:03	3–4
I. Tauferer (J. Ramoser, A. Lambacher) (PP) – 52:43	4–4
A. Lambacher (J. Ramoser, I. Tauferer) – 62:48	5–4

4 min
Penalties
14 min
45
Shots
41

18 December 2014; 13:30	Austria	7–3 (3–0, 3–1, 1–2)	Slovenia	Pala Odegar, Asiago; Attendance: 300

Game reference

Thomas Stroj
Goalies
Tomaz Trelc
Zan Us
Referee:
(United Kingdom) Michael Hicks
Linesmen:
(Italy) Christian Cristeli
(Japan) Kenji Kosaka

P. Lindner (M. Huber) – 05:45	1–0
M. Richter (L. Haudum) – 14:18	2–0
M. Reisinger (S. Gaffal, A. Wukovits) – 14:57	3–0
T. Vallant (M. Huber, L. Haudum) (PP) – 21:45	4–0
T. Vallant (M. Huber, P. Lindner) (PP2) – 24:03	5–0
M. Reisinger (S. Gaffal) – 29:40	6–0
	6–1	32:47 – M. Jeklic (N. Unuk, L. Maver)
L. Haudum (M. Huber, M. Richter) – 47:27	7–1
	7–2	48:37 – N. Simsic (A. Jeklic)
	7–3	56:50 – L. Vincec (T. Ograjensek, N. Simsic) (PP)

8 min
Penalties
8 min
35
Shots
21

18 December 2014; 17:00	Belarus	5–1 (3–0, 1–0, 1–1)	Norway	Pala Odegar, Asiago; Attendance: 350

Game reference

Maxim Gorodetski
Goalies
Fredrik Gronstrand
Theodor Hestnes
Referee:
(Czech Republic) Robin Sir
Linesmen:
(United Kingdom) James Kavanagh
(Italy) Simone Lega

V. Fadeyev (M. Valkov) – 13:10	1–0
V. Fadeyev (D. Ambrozheichik, A. Buinitski) (PP) – 15:43	2–0
A. Buinitski (D. Ambrozheichik) – 18:43	3–0
V. Miskinov (O. Buyak, M. Valkov) – 30:32	4–0
D. Buinitski (Y. Kudin) – 42:34	5–0
	5–1	54:17 – O.P. Overgaard (A. Klavestad, H. Medhus)

4 min
Penalties
29 min
25
Shots
22

18 December 2014; 20:30	Latvia	2–4 (1–1, 0–2, 1–1)	Italy	Pala Odegar, Asiago; Attendance: 600

Game reference

Mareks Mitens
Goalies
Simone Armand Pilon
Referee:
(Finland) Jari-pekka Pajula
Linesmen:
(Finland) Markus Hagerstrom
(Denmark) Henrik Haurum

R. Locans (K. Cukste) – 3:20	1–0
	1–1	09:51 – J.A. Magnabosco (F. Pace)
	1–2	22:48 – J. Ramoser (A. Lambacher) (PP)
	1–3	37:31 – R. Lacedelli (G. Morini, P. Morini)
M. Dzierkals (R. Maslovskis, K. Rubins) (PP) – 47:35	2–3
	2–4	56:07 – J.A. Magnabosco (L. Barnabo)

35 min
Penalties
14 min
19
Shots
15

20 December 2014; 13:30	Norway	1–0 GWS (0–0, 0–0, 0–0) (OT: 0–0) (SO: 1–0)	Latvia	Pala Odegar, Asiago; Attendance: 350

Game reference
Theodor Hestnes	Goalies	Matiss Kivlenieks	Referee: (Germany) Marcus Brill; Linesmen: (Finland) Markus Hagerstrom (Poland) Mariusz Smura
O.P. Overgaard (miss); C. Karlsen (miss); T. Olsen	Shootout	(miss) R. Locans; (miss) M. Dzierkals; (miss) H. Egle	Referee: (Germany) Marcus Brill; Linesmen: (Finland) Markus Hagerstrom (Poland) Mariusz Smura
8 min	Penalties	6 min	Referee: (Germany) Marcus Brill; Linesmen: (Finland) Markus Hagerstrom (Poland) Mariusz Smura
25	Shots	21	Referee: (Germany) Marcus Brill; Linesmen: (Finland) Markus Hagerstrom (Poland) Mariusz Smura

20 December 2014; 17:00	Belarus	5–4 OT (1–3, 1–0, 2–1) (OT: 1–0)	Austria	Pala Odegar, Asiago; Attendance: 450

Game reference

Konstantin Kozlovski
Maxim Gorodetski
Goalies
Thomas Stroj
Referee:
(Finland) Jari-pekka Pajula
Linesmen:
(Italy) Christian Cristeli
(Italy) Simone Lega

D. Ambrozheichik (A. Buinitski, N. Ustinenko) (PP) – 07:23	1–0
	1–1	10:29 – M. Reisinger (A. Wukovits)
	1–2	12:13 – L. Haudum (T. Vallant)
	1–3	13:46 – S. Gaffal (M. Reisinger, D. Winkler)
A. Buinitski (D. Ambrozheichik, S. Stankevich) – 32:38	2–3
A. Buinitski (D. Ambrozheichik, N. Ustinenko) (PP) – 49:56	3–3
	3–4	52:30 – L. Haudum
A. Shantyka (D. Buinitski) – 56:12	4–4
A. Buinitski (M. Volkov) – 62:13	5–4

10 min
Penalties
12 min
27
Shots
14

20 December 2014; 20:30	Slovenia	9–5 (6–2, 1–2, 2–1)	Italy	Pala Odegar, Asiago; Attendance: 1100

Game reference

Tomaz Trelc
Goalies
Simone Armand Pilon
Daniel Morandell
Referee:
(Czech Republic) Robin Sir
Linesmen:
(United Kingdom) James Kavanagh
(Japan) Kenji Kosaka

L. Maver (G. Glavic) – 01:40	1–0
	1–1	03:10 – A. Lambacher (J. Ramoser)
K. Cepon (PP) – 06:31	2–1
Z. Jezovsek (M. Logar, N. Simsic) (PP) – 07:14	3–1
N. Unuk (S. Hadzic) – 07:56	4–1
N. Simsic 11:42	5–1
G. Glavic (M. Jeklic) – 11:52	6–1
	6–2	16:36 – R. Lacedelli (G. Morini) (PP)
	6–3	23:40 – G. Morini (R. Lacedelli)
Z. Jezovsek (SH) – 27:42	7–3
	7–4	28:04 – G. Lanziner (P. Beber) (PP)
Z. Jezovsek (T. Ogranjensek, N. Simsic) (PP) – 45:34	8–4
	8–5	46:20 – R. Lacedelli (G. Morini)
T. Kalan (S. Hadzic, N. Unuk) – 46:35	9–5

12 min
Penalties
10 min
25
Shots
24

=== Statistics ===
==== Top 10 scorers ====
Pos	Player	Country	GP	G	A	Pts	+/-	PIM
1	Dmitri Ambrozheichik	Belarus	5	4	8	12	+3	0
2	Artur Buinitski	Belarus	5	8	3	11	+2	0
3	Ludvig Hoff	Norway	4	2	6	8	+1	31
4	Mario Huber	Austria	5	2	6	8	+4	2
5	Marco Richter	Austria	5	4	3	7	+4	0
6	Lukas Haudum	Austria	5	3	4	7	+2	12
7	Giovanni Morini	Italy	5	2	5	7	+1	2
8	Markus Soberg	Norway	4	3	3	6	+2	2
9	Maximilian Reiginger	Austria	5	3	3	6	+1	8
10	Riccardo Lacedelli	Italy	5	4	1	5	+3	0
10	Mattias Norstebo	Norway	5	4	1	5	0	2

==== Goaltending leaders ====
(minimum 40% team's total ice time)

Pos	Player	Country	MINS	GA	Sv%	GAA	SO
1	Theodor Hestnes	Norway	159:28	2	96.49	0.75	1
2	Maxim Gorodetski	Belarus	140:00	3	93.62	1.29	0
3	Matiss Kivlenieks	Latvia	240:33	7	92.78	1.75	0
4	Daniel Morandell	Italy	234:52	16	87.88	4.09	0
5	Stefan Muller	Austria	142:48	13	86.46	5.46	0

=== Awards ===
==== Best Players Selected by the Directorate ====
- Goaltender: (Latvia) Matiss Kivlenieks
- Defenceman: (Norway) Mattias Norstebo
- Forward: (Belarus) Dmitri Ambrozheichik

== Division I B ==
The Division I B tournament was played in Dunaújváros, Hungary, from 14 to 20 December 2014.

=== Participating teams ===
Team	Qualification
Poland	placed 6th in Division I A last year and were relegated
Kazakhstan	placed 2nd in Division I B last year
France	placed 3rd in Division I B last year
Ukraine	placed 4th in Division I B last year
Japan	placed 5th in Division I B last year
Hungary	hosts; placed 1st in Division II A last year and were promoted

=== Final standings ===
Pos	Team	Pld	W	OTW	OTL	L	GF	GA	GD	Pts	Promotion or relegation
1	Kazakhstan	5	5	0	0	0	23	9	+14	15	Promoted to the 2016 Division I A
2	Ukraine	5	2	1	0	2	10	11	−1	8	
3	Poland	5	2	0	1	2	13	15	−2	7	
4	France	5	2	0	1	2	11	13	−2	7	
5	Japan	5	1	1	0	3	15	17	−2	5	
6	Hungary (H)	5	0	1	1	3	9	16	−7	3	Relegated to the 2016 Division II A

Source: IIHF
(H) Host

=== Match results ===
All times are local (Central European Time – UTC+1).

14 December 2014; 13:00	Japan	3–2 GWS (0–1, 1–0, 1–1) (OT: 0–0) (SO: 1–0)	France	Dunaújvárosi Jégcsarnok, Dunaújváros; Attendance: 50

Game reference

Shun Furukawa
Goalies
Victor Goy
Referee:
(Denmark) Rasmus Toppel
Linesmen:
(Hungary) Marton Nemeth
(Hungary) Daniel Soos

	0–1	07:39 – F. Kazarine (F. Bourgeois)
Y. Hirano (K. Sato, Y. Miura) – 38:49	1–1
Y. Hirano – 47:31	2–1
	2–2	58:37 – F. Douay (F. Kazarine)

T. Koizumi (miss)
Y. Hikosaka (miss)
Y. Hirano
Shootout
(miss) M. Bouvet
(miss) M. Ville
(miss) F. Douay
12 min
Penalties
8 min
32
Shots
38

14 December 2014; 16:30	Hungary	1–0 GWS (0–0, 0–0, 0–0) (OT: 0–0) (SO: 3–2)	Poland	Dunaújvárosi Jégcsarnok, Dunaújváros; Attendance: 850

Game reference
Gergely Arany	Goalies	Michael Luba	Referee: (Canada) Jonathan Alarie; Linesmen: (Belarus) Pavel Badyl (Latvia) Raivis Jucers
V. Gallo; P. Vincze (miss); C. Erdely; V. Gallo (miss); C. Erdely (miss); P. Vincze	Shootout	B. Fraszko; P. Wronka; (miss) P. Malicki; (miss) B. Fraszko; (miss) P. Wronka; (miss) R. Gazda	Referee: (Canada) Jonathan Alarie; Linesmen: (Belarus) Pavel Badyl (Latvia) Raivis Jucers
12 min	Penalties	12 min	Referee: (Canada) Jonathan Alarie; Linesmen: (Belarus) Pavel Badyl (Latvia) Raivis Jucers
57	Shots	18	Referee: (Canada) Jonathan Alarie; Linesmen: (Belarus) Pavel Badyl (Latvia) Raivis Jucers

14 December 2014; 20:00	Ukraine	1–5 (0–0, 1–4, 0–1)	Kazakhstan	Dunaújvárosi Jégcsarnok, Dunaújváros; Attendance: 50

Game reference

Eduard Zakharchenko
Goalies
Yuri Volosenko
Referee:
(Switzerland) Ken Mollard
Linesmen:
(Austria) Martin Smeibidlo
(Russia) Alexander Sysuev

V. Lyalka (V. Andreikiv) (PP2) – 24:17	1–0
	1–1	28:23 – Y. Korolinski (S. Zinchenko)
	1–2	31:25 – K. Savitski (I. Stepanenko, M. Ibraibekov) (PP)
	1–3	37:44 – D. Presnov (I. Gorozhaninov, Y. Korolinski)
	1–4	38:32 – K. Savitski (N. Mikhailis)
	1–5	49:54 – D. Presnov (S. Zinchenko)

10 min
Penalties
6 min
15
Shots
45

15 December 2014; 13:00	Poland	1–2 (1–0, 0–1, 0–1)	Ukraine	Dunaújvárosi Jégcsarnok, Dunaújváros; Attendance: 50

Game reference

Michael Luba
Goalies
Eduard Zakharchenko
Referee:
(Estonia) Igor Tsernyshov
Linesmen:
(Hungary) Marton Nemeth
(Hungary) Daniel Soos

P. Malicki (S. Skrodziuk, K. Wasinski) – 07:15	1–0
	1–1	22:49 – A. Hryhoryev (O. Vorona) (PP)
	1–2	41:08 – I. Merezhko (T. Hrytsenko, O. Vorona) (PP)

18 min
Penalties
12 min
43
Shots
39

15 December 2014; 16:30	France	4–3 (0–1, 2–2, 2–0)	Hungary	Dunaújvárosi Jégcsarnok, Dunaújváros; Attendance: 700

Game reference

Victor Goy
Goalies
Daniel Kornakker
Referee:
(Switzerland) Ken Mollard
Linesmen:
(Austria) Martin Smeibidlo
(Russia) Alexander Sysuev

	0–1	19:43 – C. Erdely (K. Szabo, P. Vincze)
	0–2	25:05 – P. Vincze (C. Erdely, D. Szabo) (PP)
M. Bouvet (G. Leclerc, F. Douay) (PP) – 30:46	1–2
M. Bouvet (R. Lamboley) – 32:45	2–2
	2–3	35:10 – I. Terbocs (V. Gallo) (PP)
G. Leclerc (M. Bouvet, P. Crinon) – 44:34	3–3
A. Faure (M. Ville) – 55:14	4–3

16 min
Penalties
10 min
32
Shots
39

15 December 2014; 20:00	Kazakhstan	6–3 (1–0, 3–2, 2–1)	Japan	Dunaújvárosi Jégcsarnok, Dunaújváros

Game reference

Yuri Volosenko
Goalies
Shun Furukawa
Atsushi Takase
Referees:
(Canada) Jonathan Alarie
100
Linesmen:
(Norway) Remi Aasum
(Latvia) Raivis Jucers

Y. Korolinski (D. Grents, S. Zinchenko) (PP) – 13:36	1–0
A. Shestakov (M. Ibraibekov, N. Mikhailis) (SH) – 20:23	2–0
D. Grents (Y. Korolinski, S. Zinchenko) – 23:40	3–0
	3–1	25:13 – Y. Hirano (Y. Hikosaka, S. Namioka)
A. Shestakov (N. Mikhailis, K. Savitski) (PP) – 28:25	4–1
	4–2	36:54 – J. Osaka
A. Shestakov (K. Savitski, N. Mikhailis) – 44:15	5–2
N. Mikhailis (A. Shestakov) (SH) – 48:28	6–2
	6–3	53:50 – R. Katsuragawa (T. Koizumi)

12 min
Penalties
10 min
35
Shots
26

17 December 2014; 13:00	Kazakhstan	3–1 (1–0, 1–1, 1–0)	France	Dunaújvárosi Jégcsarnok, Dunaújváros; Attendance: 50

Game reference

Yuri Volosenko
Goalies
Rafael Garnier
Referee:
(Switzerland) Ken Mollard
Linesmen:
(Norway) Remi Aasum
(Russia) Alexander Sysuev

A. Shestakov (K. Savitski) – 18:57	1–0
	1–1	33:29 – G. Leclerc
A. Asetov (I. Kinstler) – 39:34	2–1
K. Savitski (A. Shestakov) – 51:36	3–1

4 min
Penalties
6 min
42
Shots
39

17 December 2014; 16:30	Hungary	3–4 GWS (2–1, 1–1, 0–1) (OT: 0–0) (SO: 1–2)	Ukraine	Dunaújvárosi Jégcsarnok, Dunaújváros; Attendance: 500

Game reference

Gergely Arany
Goalies
Eduard Zakharchenko
Referee:
(Estonia) Igor Tsernyshov
Linesmen:
(Belarus) Pavel Badyl
(Latvia) Raivis Jucers

P. Vincze (C. Erdely) (PP2) – 05:41	1–0
C. Erdely (P. Vincze, A. Reisz) (PP) – 09:47	2–0
	2–1	19:04 – S. Kuzmyk (P. Naida, V. Andrikiv) (PP)
	2–2	36:39 – Y. Tymchenko (A. Boikov)
P. Vincze (F. Kocsis, M. Szaller) – 39:31	3–2
	3–3	55:29 – Y. Tymchenko (S. Kuzmyk, V. Varyvoda) (PP)

V. Gallo (miss)
P. Vincze (miss)
C. Erdely
C. Erdely (miss)
Shootout
(miss) T. Hrytsenko
V. Luhovy
(miss) Y. Tymchenko
V. Luhovy
18 min
Penalties
16 min
55
Shots
28

17 December 2014; 20:00	Poland	5–3 (0–0, 0–1, 5–2)	Japan	Dunaújvárosi Jégcsarnok, Dunaújváros; Attendance: 50

Game reference

Michael Luba
Goalies
Shun Furukawa
Referee:
(Denmark) Rasmus Toppel
Linesmen:
(Hungary) Marton Nemeth
(Austria) Martin Smeibidlo

	0–1	30:53 – Y. Hirano (H. Sakamoto)
B. Fraszko (P. Wronka, R. Sawicki) – 40:42	1–1
B. Fraszko (P. Wronka, R. Sawicki) – 43:17	2–1
	2–2	44:48 – Y. Hirano (H. Sakamoto)
	2–3	49:07 – Y. Hikosaka (H. Sakamoto, Y. Hirano)
K. Kisielewski – 50:14	3–3
R. Sawicki (R. Gazda, B. Fraszko) – 51:02	4–3
B. Fraszko (ENG) – 59:12	5–3

2 min
Penalties
10 min
41
Shots
45

18 December 2014; 13:00	Ukraine	3–1 (0–0, 2–1, 1–0)	Japan	Dunaújvárosi Jégcsarnok, Dunaújváros; Attendance: 50

Game reference

Eduard Zakharchenko
Goalies
Shun Furukawa
Referee:
(Canada) Jonathan Alarie
Linesmen:
(Hungary) Daniel Soos
(Russia) Alexander Sysuev

S. Kuzmyk (A. Boikov, I. Merezhko) – 30:22	1–0
	1–1	31:51 – Y. Nakayashiki (M. Matsumoto, J. Unui)
V. Lyalka (I. Merezhko, S. Kuzmyk) – 35:49	2–1
Y. Tymchenko (S. Kuzmyk, V. Lyalka) – 50:39	3–1

10 min
Penalties
8 min
21
Shots
33

18 December 2014; 16:30	Kazakhstan	3–1 (1–0, 0–1, 2–0)	Hungary	Dunaújvárosi Jégcsarnok, Dunaújváros; Attendance: 650

Game reference

Yuri Volosenko
Goalies
Daniel Kornakker
Referee:
(Denmark) Rasmus Toppel
Linesmen:
(Norway) Remi Aasum
(Austria) Martin Smeibidlo

N. Mikhailis (M. Ibraibekov, I. Stepanenko) (PP) – 19:51	1–0
	1–1	22:47 – D. Szabo (G. Vallo, I. Terbocs)
K. Savitski (M. Ibraibekov) (PP) – 47:34	2–1
A. Shestakov (N. Mikhailis) – 59:43	3–1

14 min
Penalties
20 min
37
Shots
32

18 December 2014; 20:00	France	3–4 (1–1, 0–1, 2–2)	Poland	Dunaújvárosi Jégcsarnok, Dunaújváros; Attendance: 80

Game reference

Victor Goy
Goalies
Michael Luba
Referee:
(Estonia) Igor Tsernyshov
Linesmen:
(Belarus) Pavel Badyl
(Hungary) Marton Nemeth

M. Ville (F. Kazarine, F. Bourgeois) – 09:12	1–0
	1–1	17:02 – P. Wronka (O. Jaskiewicz, R. Gazda)
	1–2	35:15 – M. Goscinski (S. Skrodziuk)
R. Lamboley (G. Leclerc, P. Crinon) (PP) – 41:03	2–2
	2–3	53:29 – B. Fraszko (P. Wronka) (PP)
	2–4	54:30 – R. Sawicki (R. Gazda, P. Wronka) (PP)
G. Leclerc (M. Ville) – 59:55	3–4

10 min
Penalties
4 min
30
Shots
33

20 December 2014; 13:00	Poland	3–6 (1–2, 2–2, 0–2)	Kazakhstan	Dunaújvárosi Jégcsarnok, Dunaújváros; Attendance: 50

Game reference

Michael Luba
Goalies
Valeri Sevidov
Referee:
(Denmark) Rasmus Toppel
Linesmen:
(Belarus) Pavel Badyl
(Hungary) Daniel Soos

K. Kisielewski (K. Wasinski) – 01:45	1–0
	1–1	03:02 – N. Mikhailis (A. Shestakov)
	1–2	05:18 – A. Shestakov (N. Mikhailis, A. Asetov) (PP)
P. Wronka (R. Sawicki, B. Fraszko) – 27:39	2–2
	2–3	32:28 – N. Mikhailis (S. Alexandrov, A. Asetov)
R. Sawicki (P. Wronka, O. Jaskiewicz) (PP) – 33:33	3–3
	3–4	36:21 – I. Stepanenko (SH)
	3–5	45:36 – D. Grents (D. Presnov, Y. Korolinski)
	3–6	56:37 – N. Mikhailis (M. Ibraibekov)

6 min
Penalties
8 min
30
Shots
53

20 December 2014; 16:30	Japan	5–1 (1–0, 1–1, 3–0)	Hungary	Dunaújvárosi Jégcsarnok, Dunaújváros; Attendance: 1000

Game reference

Shun Furukawa
Goalies
Gergely Arany
Referee:
(Canada) Jonathan Alarie
Linesmen:
(Latvia) Raivis Jucers
(Russia) Alexander Sysuev

Y. Arai (D. Ohba, J. Inui) – 01:56	1–0
R. Katsuragawa – 21:24	2–0
	2–1	26:26 – V. Gallo (E. Keresztury) (PP)
J. Inui – 41:47	3–1
J. Osaka (J. Halliday) – 53:54	4–1
R. Katsuragawa (Y. Hirano, T. Koizumi) – 57:15	5–1

8 min
Penalties
10 min
33
Shots
29

20 December 2014; 20:00	France	1–0 (0–0, 0–0, 1–0)	Ukraine	Dunaújvárosi Jégcsarnok, Dunaújváros; Attendance: 120

Game reference
Victor Goy	Goalies	Eduard Zakharchenko	Referee: (Estonia) Igor Tsernyshov; Linesmen: (Norway) Remi Aasum (Hungary) Marton Nemeth
G. Leclerc (R. Lamboley, M. Bouvet) – 41:15 / 1–0			Referee: (Estonia) Igor Tsernyshov; Linesmen: (Norway) Remi Aasum (Hungary) Marton Nemeth
4 min	Penalties	6 min	Referee: (Estonia) Igor Tsernyshov; Linesmen: (Norway) Remi Aasum (Hungary) Marton Nemeth
33	Shots	30	Referee: (Estonia) Igor Tsernyshov; Linesmen: (Norway) Remi Aasum (Hungary) Marton Nemeth

=== Statistics ===
==== Top 10 scorers ====
Pos	Player	Country	GP	G	A	Pts	+/-	PIM
1	Nikita Mikhailis	Kazakhstan	5	5	6	11	+9	0
2	Arkadi Shestakov	Kazakhstan	5	6	3	9	+9	4
3	Yushiroh Hirano	Japan	5	6	2	8	+5	4
4	Kirill Savitski	Kazakhstan	4	4	3	7	+5	2
5	Patryk Wronka	Poland	5	2	5	7	+3	2
6	Peter Vincze	Hungary	5	4	2	6	+1	4
6	Bartosz Fraszko	Poland	5	4	2	6	+4	0
6	Guillaume Leclerc	France	5	4	2	6	+2	2
9	Radoslaw Sawicki	Poland	5	3	3	6	+3	2
10	Yevgeni Korolinski	Kazakhstan	5	2	3	5	+5	2
10	Serhii Kuzmyk	Ukraine	5	2	3	5	+2	4

==== Goaltending leaders ====
(minimum 40% team's total ice time)

Pos	Player	Country	MINS	GA	Sv%	GAA	SO
1	Eduard Zakharchenko	Ukraine	304:12	11	94.74	2.17	0
2	Yuri Volosenko	Kazakhstan	240:00	6	94.64	1.50	0
3	Michael Luba	Poland	304:25	15	93.30	2.96	0
4	Victor Goy	France	243:01	10	92.54	2.47	1
5	Shun Furukawa	Japan	269:29	13	91.10	2.89	0

=== Awards ===
==== Best Players Selected by the Directorate ====
- Goaltender: (Poland) Michael Luba
- Defenceman: (France) Pierre Crinon
- Forward: (Kazakhstan) Kirill Savitski
