= Gordie Howe hat trick =

Unofficial statistic in professional ice hockey

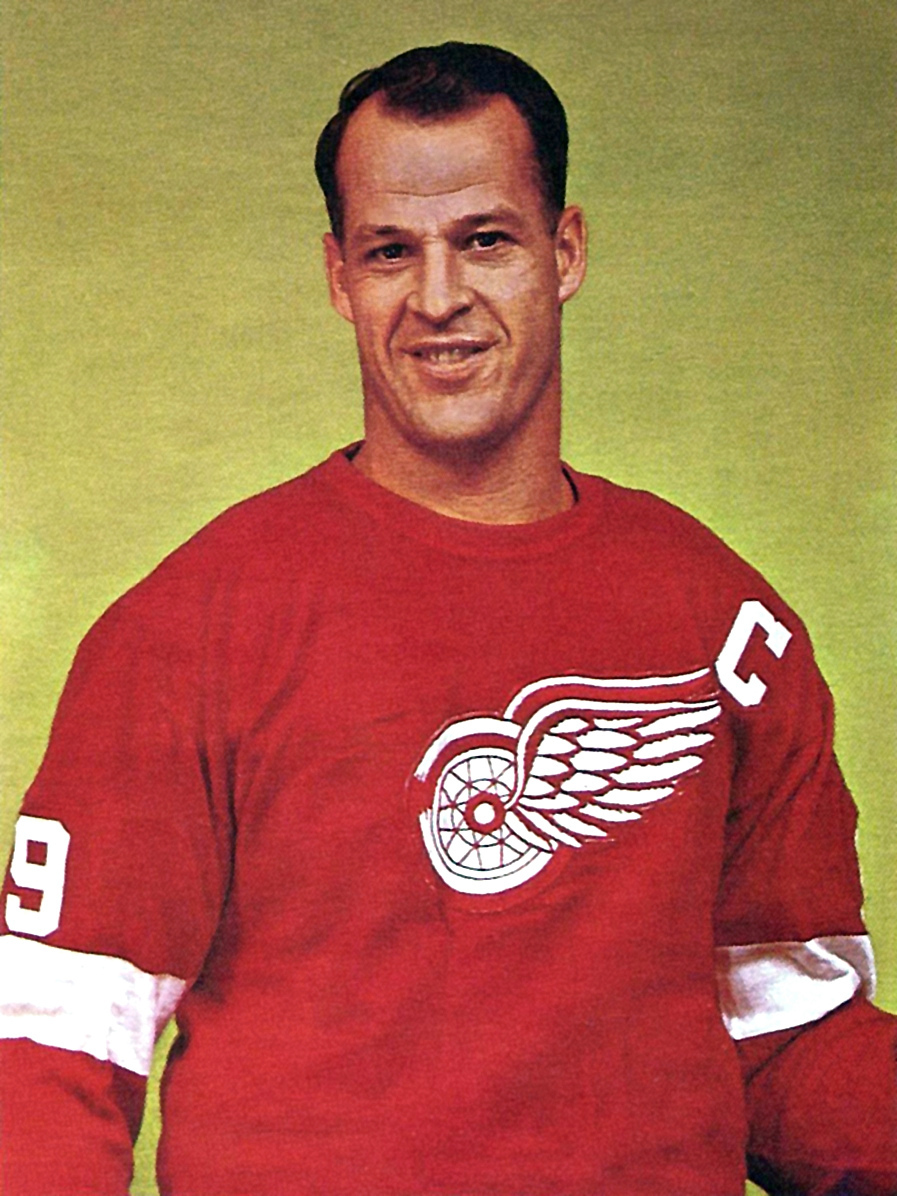
Gordie Howe on an early Chex hockey card

In ice hockey, a Gordie Howe hat trick is accomplished when a player collects a goal, an assist, and a fight in the same game. It is named after Hall of Famer Gordie Howe.

The term was coined by a 1950s New York sportswriter, although Howe himself accomplished the feat only twice in his five-decade career. Howe's son Marty once remarked, "The Gordie Howe hat trick should really be a goal, an assist and a cross-check to the face. That might be more accurate."

== Incidents ==
The first known Gordie Howe hat trick was achieved by Hockey Hall of Fame defenceman Harry Cameron of the Toronto Arenas on December 26, 1917, in a 7–5 win against the Montreal Canadiens.

Howe himself accomplished his first Gordie Howe hat trick on October 11, 1953, when he scored a goal, assisted on Red Kelly's goal, and fought the Toronto Maple Leafs' Fernie Flaman. The second occurrence was on March 21, 1954, once again versus the Maple Leafs. Howe scored the opening goal, assisted on two Ted Lindsay goals, and fought Ted "Teeder" Kennedy.

=== Multiples ===
The "Double Gordie", involving two players who each tallied a goal and an assist and fought each other, has occurred on six occasions:

- On April 9, 1981, Brad Park (who recorded 1G, 3A) fought Bobby Smith (who recorded 1G, 1A)
- On March 9, 2010, Fedor Tyutin (who recorded 1G, 2A) fought Ryan Getzlaf (who recorded 1G, 1A)
- On January 10, 2012, Adam Henrique (who recorded 1G, 1A) fought Jarome Iginla (who recorded 1G, 2A)
- On October 30, 2023, Liam O'Brien (who recorded 1G, 1A) fought Nick Foligno, and Jack McBain (who recorded 2G, 2A) fought Jarred Tinordi (the first time in 35 years that 2 players of the same team got a Gordie Howe hat trick)
- On October 9, 2024, J. T. Miller (who recorded 1G, 1A) fought Anthony Mantha (who recorded 1G, 1A)
- On March 7, 2026, Alexander Kerfoot (who recorded 1G, 1A) fought Damon Severson (who recorded 1G, 1A)

In the April 9, 1981, playoff game between the Minnesota North Stars and the Boston Bruins where Brad Park and Bobby Smith completed a Double Gordie, Bryan Maxwell also completed a Gordie Howe hat trick of his own. The North Stars won the game 9–6.

In the March 7, 2026 game between the Utah Mammoth and the Columbus Blue Jackets where Alexander Kerfoot and Damon Severson completed a Double Gordie, Mathieu Olivier also completed a Gordie Howe hat trick, recording 1G, 1A, and a fight against Ian Cole. The Mammoth won the game in overtime 5-4.

=== Debut variations ===
A Gordie Howe hat trick that included a player's first NHL goal occurred on November 19, 2014, when Steve Pinizzotto was called up by the Edmonton Oilers and he made his 2014–15 season debut against his previous team, the Vancouver Canucks.

On December 29, 2018, Tyler Lewington of the Washington Capitals, playing in just his second career NHL game, against the Ottawa Senators, became the only player to complete a Gordie Howe hat trick with all three components being NHL career firsts, including his first assist on a goal by Tom Wilson and his first fight against Zack Smith.

Another player who scored his first NHL goal in a Gordie Howe hat trick was Shane O'Brien of the Anaheim Ducks, in a 4-1 win over the Detroit Red Wings on October 18, 2006.

Tom Wilson had his first Olympic goal as part of a Gordie Howe hat trick while playing as part of Team Canada against France, in the 2026 Winter Olympics, when he fought French player Pierre Crinon in retaliation for Crinon's forearm hit to Nathan MacKinnon's jaw earlier in the game. Wilson and Crinon were both ejected from the game for fighting. Because fighting during Olympic hockey games is strictly prohibited under International Ice Hockey Federation (IIHF) rules (unlike the NHL), this is also believed to have been the first Gordie Howe hat trick completed in Olympic history.

=== Consecutive days ===
Doug Risebrough of the Montreal Canadiens became the first NHL player to register a Gordie Howe hat trick on consecutive days, on February 15 and 16, 1975, both games against the Chicago Black Hawks. Jacob Trouba of the New York Rangers became the second to do it on December 7, 2021, against the Blackhawks and the following night against the Colorado Avalanche.

=== Women's hockey ===
Tereza Vanišová of the Ottawa Charge was the first woman to record a Gordie Howe hat trick in the Professional Women's Hockey League (PWHL). She recorded the feat in a game against the Boston Fleet on February 20, 2025. Her fight against Jill Saulnier only resulted in a roughing penalty, but was considered to be the first fight in PWHL history. Vanišová's goal was in the dying seconds of regulation, tying the game 2–2. The team went on to lose in overtime.

== Leaders ==
Although he played a record 2,421 professional hockey games, Gordie Howe himself achieved only two "Gordie Howe hat tricks" in his NHL career.

The all-time leaders in Gordie Howe hat tricks are Rick Tocchet with 18 and Brendan Shanahan (who would later become the NHL's chief disciplinarian) with 17. Next is Brian Sutter with 16, then Tiger Williams and Wilf Paiement with 15 each.
