= Nikita Ustinenko =

Belarusian ice hockey player

- Born: April 22, 1995 (age 30) Gomel, Belarus
- Height: 6 ft 1 in (185 cm)
- Weight: 179 lb (81 kg; 12 st 11 lb)
- Position: Defence
- Shoots: Right
- BXL team Former teams: HC Shakhtyor Soligorsk; HK Gomel; Dinamo Minsk; HC Yugra; Molot-Prikamye Perm
- National team: Belarus
- Playing career: 2012–present

Nikita Ustinenko (born April 22, 1995) is a Belarusian professional ice hockey player. He is currently plays for HC Shakhtyor Soligorsk of the Belarusian Extraliga (BXL). He has formerly played with top flight club, HC Dinamo Minsk of the Kontinental Hockey League (KHL) and the Belarus men's national ice hockey team.

== International play ==
Ustinenko was named in the Belarus men's national ice hockey team for competition at the 2015 IIHF World Championship.

== Career statistics ==
=== Regular season and playoffs ===
			Regular season					Playoffs
Season	Team	League	GP	G	A	Pts	PIM	GP	G	A	Pts	PIM
2012–13	RCOP Raubichi	BVL	34	1	2	3	35	4	0	0	0	0
2013–14	HK Gomel	BXL	22	0	2	2	2	—	—	—	—	—
2013–14	HK Gomel-2	BVL	31	13	15	28	32	9	4	3	7	12
2014–15	HK Gomel	BXL	10	2	1	3	6	—	—	—	—	—
2014–15	HK Gomel-2	BVL	2	1	0	1	2	—	—	—	—	—
2014–15	Dinamo-Shinnik Bobruisk	MHL	38	5	6	11	24	6	0	2	2	2
2015–16	Dinamo Minsk	KHL	17	0	0	0	4	—	—	—	—	—
2015–16	Dinamo-Molodechno	BXL	27	2	6	8	14	7	0	1	1	12
2016–17	Dinamo Minsk	KHL	12	1	3	4	4	—	—	—	—	—
2016–17	Dinamo-Molodechno	BXL	13	0	5	5	8	5	0	1	1	2
2017–18	Dinamo Minsk	KHL	9	0	2	2	4	—	—	—	—	—
2017–18	Dinamo-Molodechno	BXL	27	1	8	9	20	—	—	—	—	—
2017–18	Yunost Minsk	BXL	8	0	2	2	6	15	1	5	6	6
2018–19	HC Yugra	VHL	3	0	0	0	2	—	—	—	—	—
2018–19	Molot-Prikamye Perm	VHL	13	1	2	3	31	—	—	—	—	—
KHL totals			38	1	5	6	12	—	—	—	—	—

=== International ===
Year	Team	Event	Result	GP	G	A	Pts	PIM
2013	Belarus	WJC18-D1	14th	5	0	1	1	0
2015	Belarus	WJC-D1	11th	5	0	5	5	4
2015	Belarus	WC	7th	5	0	0	0	0
2016	Belarus	WC	12th	5	0	0	0	2
2018	Belarus	WC	15th	5	0	0	0	2
Junior totals				10	0	6	6	4
Senior totals				15	0	0	0	4
