= Power forward (ice hockey) =

Ice hockey forward known for their skill and physicality

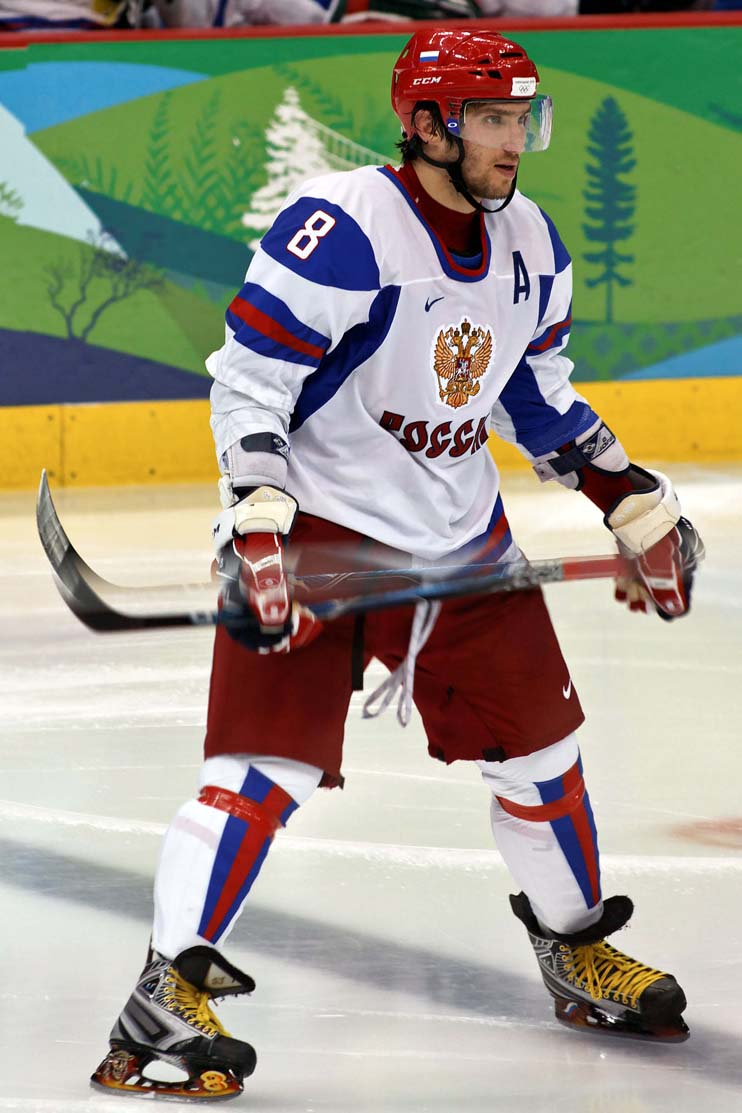
Alexander Ovechkin, considered by many as one of the greatest goal scorers in NHL history, is often described as a "power forward".

In ice hockey, power forward (PWF) is a loosely applied characterization of a forward who is big and strong, equally capable of playing physically or scoring goals and would most likely have high totals in both points and penalties. It is usually used in reference to a forward who is physically large, with the toughness to dig the puck out of the corners, possesses offensive instincts, has mobility, puck-handling skills, may be difficult to knock off the puck or to push away from the front of the goal and willingly engage in fights when he feels it is required. Possessing both physical size and offensive ability, power forwards are also often referred to as the 'complete' hockey player.

Historically, power forward was not originally a hockey term, finding comparatively recent origins from basketball. Harry Sinden, former president of the Boston Bruins, claims power forward first became part of hockey terminology because of the style of play of Cam Neely, an NHL player from 1983 to 1996, who could play ruggedly and also score goals.

Punch Broadbent was one of the first players who pioneered the style before the NHL was founded in 1917, while Charlie Conacher, Phil Esposito, Gordie Howe, Maurice Richard and Bert Olmstead are likewise considered quintessential examples of power forwards in the decades before the term entered hockey vernacular.

== NHL players described as power forwards ==
† Hockey Hall of Fame inductee

Player	Career	Ref
Josh Anderson	2014–present	
Nik Antropov	1996–2015	
Jason Arnott	1993–2013	
David Backes	2006–2021	
Jamie Benn	2009–present	
Sam Bennett	2015–present	
Todd Bertuzzi	1995–2014	
Tyler Bertuzzi	2016–present	
David Booth	2006–2018	
Mel Bridgman	1975–1989	
Punch Broadbent†	1912–1929	
Dustin Brown	2003–2022	
Dino Ciccarelli	1980–1999	
Wendel Clark	1985–2000	
Ryan Clowe	2003–2015	
Erik Cole	2000–2015	
Blake Coleman	2015–present	
Charlie Conacher†	1929–1941	
Shayne Corson	1985–2004	
Geoff Courtnall	1983–2000	
Lawson Crouse	2016–present	
Kevin Dineen	1984–2002	
Shane Doan	1995–2017	
Gary Dornhoefer	1963–1978	
Pierre-Luc Dubois	2017–present	
Phil Esposito†	1963–1981	
Mike Fisher	1999–2018	
Marcus Foligno	2009–present	
Mike Foligno	1979–1994	
Nick Foligno	2007–present	
Peter Forsberg	1989–2011	
Johan Franzen	1999–2016	
Gerard Gallant	1984–1995	
Ryan Getzlaf	2005–2022	
Clark Gillies†	1974–1988	
Doug Gilmour†	1983–2003	
Chris Gratton	1993–2009	
Bill Guerin	1991–2010	
Ryan Hartman	2015–present	
Scott Hartnell	2000–2018	
Paul Holmgren	1976–1985	
Tomas Holmström	1990–2012	
Nathan Horton	2003–2014	
Gordie Howe†	1945–1971, 1973–1980	
Jarome Iginla†	1996–2017	
Jaromír Jágr	1990-2008, 2011–2018	
Tanner Jeannot	2021–present	
Dakota Joshua	2021–present	
Evander Kane	2009–present	
Tim Kerr	1980–1993	
Ryan Kesler	2003–2019	
Matthew Knies	2023-present	
Mike Knuble	1995–2013	
Ilya Kovalchuk	1999–2024	
Chris Kreider	2012–present	
Andrew Ladd	2005–2022	
Gabriel Landeskog	2011–present	
John LeClair	1991–2006	
Anders Lee	2013–present	
Claude Lemieux	1983–2004, 2008–2009	
Trevor Linden	1988–2008	
Eric Lindros†	1992–2007	
Milan Lucic	2007–present	
Evgeni Malkin	2003–present	
Ryan Malone	2003–2015, 2017	
Patrick Maroon	2008–2025	
Randy McKay	1988–2003	
Scott Mellanby	1986–2007	
Mark Messier†	1978–2004	
Brenden Morrow	1999–2015	
Rick Nash	2002–2018	
James Neal	2008–present	
Cam Neely†	1983–1996	
Owen Nolan	1990–2011	
Terry O'Reilly	1972–1985	
Eddie Olczyk	1984–2000	
Bert Olmstead†	1948–1962	
Joel Otto	1984–1998	
Alex Ovechkin	2005–present	
Dustin Penner	2005–2014	
Corey Perry	2005–present	
Willi Plett	1975–1988	
Alexei Ponikarovsky	1998–2018	
Keith Primeau	1990–2005	
Aliaksei Protas	2021–present	
Mikael Renberg	1993–2004	
Maurice Richard†	1942–1960	
Mike Richards	2005–2016	
Nick Ritchie	2015–present	
Gary Roberts	1986–2009	
Tomas Sandstrom	1982–2002	
Al Secord	1978–1990, 1994–1996	
Brendan Shanahan†	1987–2009	
Wayne Simmonds	2008–2023	
Ryan Smyth	1994–2014	
Eric Staal	2003–2023	
Jordan Staal	2006–present	
Kevin Stevens	1987–2002	
Mark Stone	2012–present	
Mats Sundin†	1989–2009	
Andrei Svechnikov	2018–present	
Tage Thompson	2017–present	
Brady Tkachuk	2018–present	
Keith Tkachuk	1991–2010	
Matthew Tkachuk	2016–present	
Rick Tocchet	1984–2002	
Alex Tuch	2017–present	
Rick Vaive	1979–1992	
Blake Wheeler	2008–2025	
Tom Wilson	2013–present	
