= Ludvig Hoff =

Norwegian ice hockey player (born 1996)

- Born: 16 October 1996 (age 29) Oslo, Norway
- Height: 5 ft 10 in (178 cm)
- Weight: 195 lb (88 kg; 13 st 13 lb)
- Position: Left wing
- Shoots: Left
- GET-ligaen team: Stavanger Oilers
- National team: Norway
- Playing career: 2018–present

Ludvig Hoff (born 16 October 1996) is a Norwegian professional ice hockey player for the Stavanger Oilers of the GET-ligaen. He was born in Oslo and is the son of former Olympic athlete, Geir Hoff. He spent three seasons of college ice hockey with the North Dakota Fighting Hawks.

Hoff was selected to compete at the 2018 Winter Olympics as a member of the Norway men's national ice hockey team.

== Career statistics ==
=== Regular season and playoffs ===
			Regular season					Playoffs
Season	Team	League	GP	G	A	Pts	PIM	GP	G	A	Pts	PIM
2010–11	Hasle/Løren IL	NOR U17	28	23	16	39	41	—	—	—	—	—
2011–12	Vålerenga Ishockey	NOR U17	26	25	36	61	43	—	—	—	—	—
2011–12	Vålerenga Ishockey	NOR U19	20	12	17	29	4	6	0	3	3	0
2012–13	Vålerenga Ishockey	NOR U18	16	25	20	45	14	5	8	8	16	6
2012–13	Vålerenga Ishockey	NOR U20	30	26	23	49	22	6	3	5	8	4
2013–14	Vålerenga Ishockey	NOR U18	6	9	10	19	27	—	—	—	—	—
2013–14	Vålerenga Ishockey	NOR U20	17	15	15	30	76	—	—	—	—	—
2013–14	Lincoln Stars	USHL	26	2	10	12	14	—	—	—	—	—
2014–15	Lincoln Stars	USHL	54	16	16	32	51	—	—	—	—	—
2015–16	Lincoln Stars	USHL	56	20	37	57	35	4	1	2	3	4
2016–17	University of North Dakota	NCHC	36	4	12	16	24	—	—	—	—	—
2017–18	University of North Dakota	NCHC	25	3	6	9	4	—	—	—	—	—
2018–19	University of North Dakota	NCHC	31	3	8	11	6	—	—	—	—	—
2019–20	Stavanger Oilers	NOR	33	13	14	27	26	—	—	—	—	—
2020–21	Stavanger Oilers	NOR	9	1	4	5	6	—	—	—	—	—
2021–22	Stavanger Oilers	NOR	37	13	13	26	35	15	3	9	12	8
2022–23	Stavanger Oilers	NOR	40	11	26	37	16	15	5	5	10	8
NOR totals			119	38	57	95	83	30	8	14	22	16

=== International ===
Year	Team	Event	GP	G	A	Pts	PIM
2013	Norway	WJC18 D1A	5	2	5	7	4
2014	Norway	WJC	7	0	2	2	16
2014	Norway	WJC18 D1A	5	3	5	8	4
2015	Norway	WJC D1A	4	2	6	8	31
2016	Norway	WJC D1A	5	3	0	3	0
2018	Norway	OG	3	0	0	0	4
2018	Norway	WC	6	0	0	0	0
2021	Norway	WC	3	0	0	0	0
2022	Norway	WC	7	1	2	3	29
2023	Norway	WC	7	1	0	1	6
Junior totals			26	10	18	28	55
Senior totals			26	2	2	4	39
