= Mattias Nørstebø =

Norwegian ice hockey player (born 1995)

- Born: June 3, 1995 (age 30) Trondheim, Norway
- Height: 5 ft 10 in (178 cm)
- Weight: 176 lb (80 kg; 12 st 8 lb)
- Position: Defence
- Shoots: Left
- NOR team Former teams: Stavanger Oilers; Brynäs IF; Frölunda HC; HV71
- National team: Norway
- Playing career: 2013–present

Mattias Nørstebø (born June 3, 1995) is a Norwegian professional ice hockey defenseman. He is currently playing for Stavanger Oilers in the EliteHockey Ligaen (NOR).

== Playing career ==
He made his Elitserien debut playing with Brynäs IF during the 2012–13 Elitserien season. After five seasons within Brynäs IF, Nørstebø left out of contract to sign a two-year deal for SHL rivals, Frölunda HC, on March 31, 2016.

After three seasons within Frölunda HC, Nørstebø left as a free agent following the 2018–19 campaign. He signed a one-year contract in the Allsvenskan, returning to former loan club Mora IK on a one-year contract on 26 July 2019.

== Career statistics ==
=== Regular season and playoffs ===
			Regular season					Playoffs
Season	Team	League	GP	G	A	Pts	PIM	GP	G	A	Pts	PIM
2010–11	Rosenborg IHK	NOR U17	8	4	8	12	12	2	2	2	4	2
2010–11	Rosenborg IHK	NOR U19	26	9	18	27	18	5	2	5	7	6
2011–12	Brynäs IF	J18	12	1	3	4	2	—	—	—	—	—
2011–12	Brynäs IF	J18 Allsv	12	2	1	3	12	6	0	0	0	2
2012–13	Brynäs IF	J18	2	0	2	2	0	—	—	—	—	—
2012–13	Brynäs IF	J18 Allsv	4	1	4	5	2	6	2	1	3	0
2012–13	Brynäs IF	J20	24	5	9	14	14	—	—	—	—	—
2012–13	Brynäs IF	SEL	17	0	0	0	6	4	0	0	0	0
2013–14	Brynäs IF	J20	36	3	9	12	16	7	0	4	4	2
2013–14	Brynäs IF	SHL	17	0	0	0	0	—	—	—	—	—
2014–15	Brynäs IF	J20	8	1	5	6	2	2	0	1	1	0
2014–15	Brynäs IF	SHL	20	0	1	1	4	7	0	1	1	4
2014–15	Mora IK	Allsv	21	3	4	7	8	—	—	—	—	—
2015–16	Brynäs IF	SHL	31	2	3	5	6	2	0	1	1	0
2016–17	Frölunda HC	SHL	43	2	6	8	4	13	0	1	1	2
2017–18	Frölunda HC	SHL	20	1	5	6	6	6	0	0	0	0
2018–19	Frölunda HC	SHL	18	1	4	5	10	—	—	—	—	—
2019–20	Mora IK	Allsv	45	7	16	23	22	—	—	—	—	—
2020–21	Mora IK	Allsv	32	3	19	22	14	2	0	2	2	2
2020–21	HV71	SHL	2	0	0	0	2	—	—	—	—	—
2021–22	IF Björklöven	Allsv	48	5	16	21	10	18	1	6	7	6
2022–23	IF Björklöven	Allsv	49	3	10	13	18	11	0	4	4	6
2023–24	IF Björklöven	Allsv	45	2	11	13	8	—	—	—	—	—
2024–25	IF Björklöven	Allsv	45	3	15	18	34	7	0	2	2	10
SHL totals			168	6	19	25	38	32	0	3	3	6

=== International ===
Year	Team	Event	Result	GP	G	A	Pts	PIM
2012	Norway	WJC18 D1A	13th	5	1	0	1	4
2013	Norway	WJC D1A	11th	4	0	2	2	0
2013	Norway	WJC18 D1A	13th	2	0	1	1	0
2014	Norway	WJC	10th	7	0	0	0	0
2015	Norway	WJC D1A	13th	5	4	1	5	2
2015	Norway	WC	11th	7	3	0	3	0
2016	Norway	WC	10th	7	0	1	1	4
2016	Norway	OGQ	Q	3	1	0	1	0
2017	Norway	WC	11th	7	0	2	2	4
2018	Norway	OG	8th	5	0	0	0	6
2019	Norway	WC	12th	6	0	0	0	2
2022	Norway	WC	13th	7	0	2	2	0
2023	Norway	WC	13th	5	0	2	2	4
2024	Norway	WC	11th	5	0	0	0	0
2024	Norway	OGQ	DNQ	3	0	2	2	2
Junior totals				23	5	4	9	6
Senior totals				55	4	9	13	22

== Awards and honors ==
Award	Year
CHL
Champions (Frölunda HC)	2017, 2019
SHL
Le Mat Trophy (Frölunda HC)	2019
