= Tom Wilson (ice hockey) =

Canadian ice hockey player (born 1994)

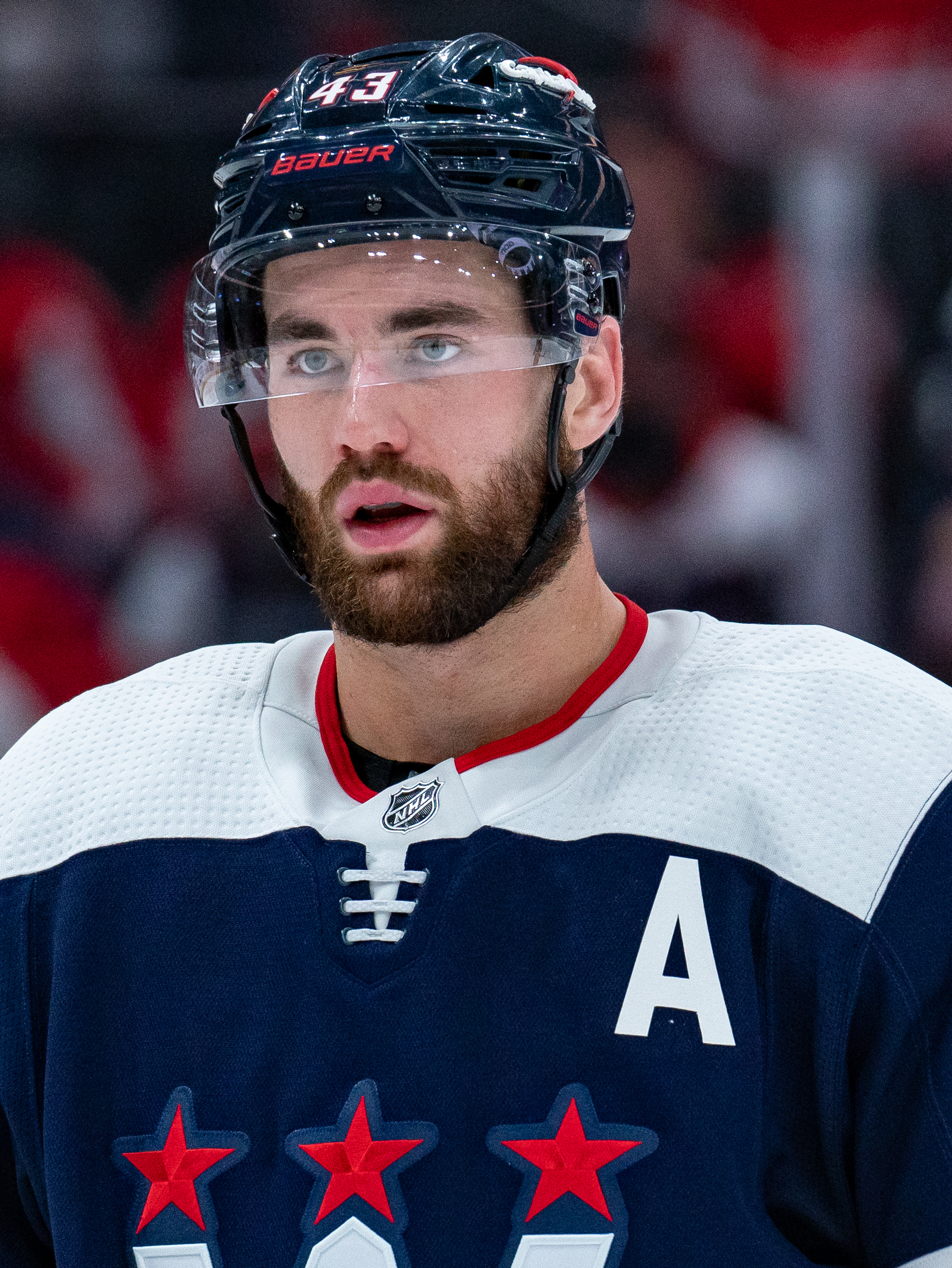
- Wilson with the Washington Capitals in January 2022
- Born: March 29, 1994 (age 32) Toronto, Ontario, Canada
- Height: 6 ft 4 in (193 cm)
- Weight: 230 lb (104 kg; 16 st 6 lb)
- Position: Right Wing
- Shoots: Right
- NHL team: Washington Capitals
- National team: Canada
- NHL draft: 16th overall, 2012; Washington Capitals
- Playing career: 2013–present

Thomas Wilson (born March 29, 1994) is a Canadian professional ice hockey player who is a right winger and alternate captain for the Washington Capitals of the National Hockey League (NHL). Throughout his career, he has been known as a power forward and an enforcer. The Capitals selected him in the first round, 16th overall, of the 2012 NHL entry draft.

Born and raised in Toronto, Ontario, Wilson began playing hockey at age two. He spent one year of minor ice hockey as a defenceman before switching to forward, where he could be more involved in the game. After spending time in the Greater Toronto Hockey League, the Plymouth Whalers of the Ontario Hockey League (OHL) selected Wilson in the second round of the 2010 OHL draft. The following year, he helped Canada to capture gold medals at both the World U-17 Hockey Challenge and the Ivan Hlinka Memorial Tournament. His first two seasons of junior ice hockey were limited by injuries to his wrist, knee, and knuckle, but he attracted attention during the 2012 J. Ross Robertson Cup playoffs, scoring seven goals and six assists in 13 playoff games. After the Whalers' 2012–13 season concluded, Wilson joined the Capitals for the 2013 Stanley Cup playoffs, playing in two games against the New York Rangers. Wilson won the Stanley Cup with the Capitals in 2018.

Wilson made the Capitals' roster for the 2013–14 NHL season, serving on the fourth line as an enforcer. He missed the first part of his sophomore season with a broken fibula, but continued his aggressive, physical style of play into the remainder of the season, racking up a high level of penalty minutes. As Wilson's career progressed, he began to receive criticism from other teams for hits and checks to his opponents' heads. Wilson was first fined for checking in 2016, and received his first suspension during the 2017 preseason. During the Capitals' Stanley Cup championship in 2018, Wilson delivered a controversial hit to Zach Aston-Reese in the second round against the Pittsburgh Penguins that resulted in a three-game suspension. The NHL elected to suspend Wilson for 20 games that October, following an illegal hit to the head of Oskar Sundqvist during a preseason game against the St. Louis Blues. It was his fourth suspension in 105 games. After serving the suspension, which was appealed and reduced to 14 games, Wilson began to retool his approach to the game, limiting his hits on his opponents and focusing instead on generating goals. During the 2018–19 NHL season, he set career highs in goals and points. In 2021, however, Wilson's performance as a power forward and enforcer came under fire from opposing coaches again after causing two serious injuries to other skaters: first Brandon Carlo of the Boston Bruins, followed by Artemi Panarin of the New York Rangers.

== Early life ==
Wilson was born on March 29, 1994, in Toronto, Ontario, the largest city in Canada. He began playing ice hockey at the age of two, when his father built an ice rink in their backyard for Wilson and his older brother Peter. Wilson grew up playing alongside the sons of National Hockey League (NHL) players such as Tom Fitzgerald, Shayne Corson, and Steve Thomas, all of whom lived in Toronto and had children around Wilson's age. Both of his parents were minor ice hockey coaches at North Toronto Memorial Arena: his father Keven coached competitive "rep" teams, while his mother Neville coached the more recreational house league.

When he began playing minor hockey, Wilson was a defenceman, but he switched to playing forward after one year so that he could be involved in more plays. After three seasons playing AA minor hockey with North Toronto, Wilson joined the Toronto Jr. Canadiens of the Greater Toronto Hockey League (GTHL), where he scored 44 goals and 105 points in his final minor season. He also played in the GTHL for the Bedford Bisons, and split time between GTHL and his school team at Greenwood College School.

== Playing career ==
=== Junior ===
The Plymouth Whalers of the Ontario Hockey League (OHL) selected Wilson in the second round, 27th overall, of the 2010 OHL Priority Selection. The team was interested in Wilson's size – at the time, he stood 6 feet 3 inches (1.91 m) and weighted 190 pounds (86 kg) – and in his physical style of play. Drafted at the age of 16, Wilson continued his education at Plymouth High School in Michigan while playing with the Whalers. Wilson took a physical, energetic approach to his junior ice hockey career at once, fighting to compete with his older teammates. His rookie 2010–11 season was limited to only 28 games after Wilson suffered a wrist injury during an international exhibition game, keeping him out of play for the second half of the season. In those 28 games, he scored three goals and three assists while racking up 71 penalty minutes.

Injuries continued to follow Wilson in the 2011–12 OHL season, including a sprained medial collateral ligament in his knee and a fractured knuckle. The latter injury occurred during the CHL/NHL Top Prospects Game, forcing Wilson to miss three weeks of games in February. In 49 regular season games for Plymouth, Wilson recorded 27 points and 141 penalty minutes. During the J. Ross Robertson Cup playoffs, however, he established himself as a strong forward for the team, stepping in for an injured Stefan Noesen. In 13 playoff games, Wilson scored an additional seven goals and six assists before the Kitchener Rangers defeated Plymouth.

Going into the 2012 NHL entry draft, the NHL Central Scouting Bureau ranked Wilson the 15th-highest prospect among all available North American skaters. That year, the Washington Capitals selected him in the first round, 16th overall, of the draft. On July 18, 2012, Wilson signed a three-year, entry-level contract with the Capitals, with the expectation that he would continue to play with Plymouth for the following season.

Wilson began the 2012–13 season with Plymouth, scoring 36 points and recording 59 penalty minutes in his first 31 games with the team. When the NHL returned to play in January 2013 after the lockout, Wilson was invited to the Capitals' training camp, where he practiced alongside veterans like Alexander Ovechkin and Nicklas Bäckström before he was returned to Plymouth. After being drafted, Wilson's behaviour on the ice began to change: he focused on point production by emulating Tomas Holmström of the Detroit Red Wings, and Whalers coach Mike Vellucci discouraged Wilson from fighting, with the implication that he was too important of a prospect to suffer injury or suspension. Wilson finished his junior ice hockey career with 17 points and 41 penalty minutes in 12 playoff games.

=== Professional (2013–present) ===
==== 2013–2015: Early years in Washington ====
After the Plymouth 2012–13 season ended, Wilson joined the Hershey Bears, the Capitals' American Hockey League (AHL) affiliate. He spent three games in Hershey before being called up to the Capitals for game five of the 2013 conference quarterfinals against the New York Rangers. He made his NHL and Stanley Cup playoffs debut on May 10, 2013, playing on the Capitals' fourth line. In only his second NHL game, Wilson broke the blade on his left skate while attempting to forecheck a member of the Rangers, and had to be assisted back to the bench by forward Jason Chimera. The Rangers ultimately took the series in seven games.

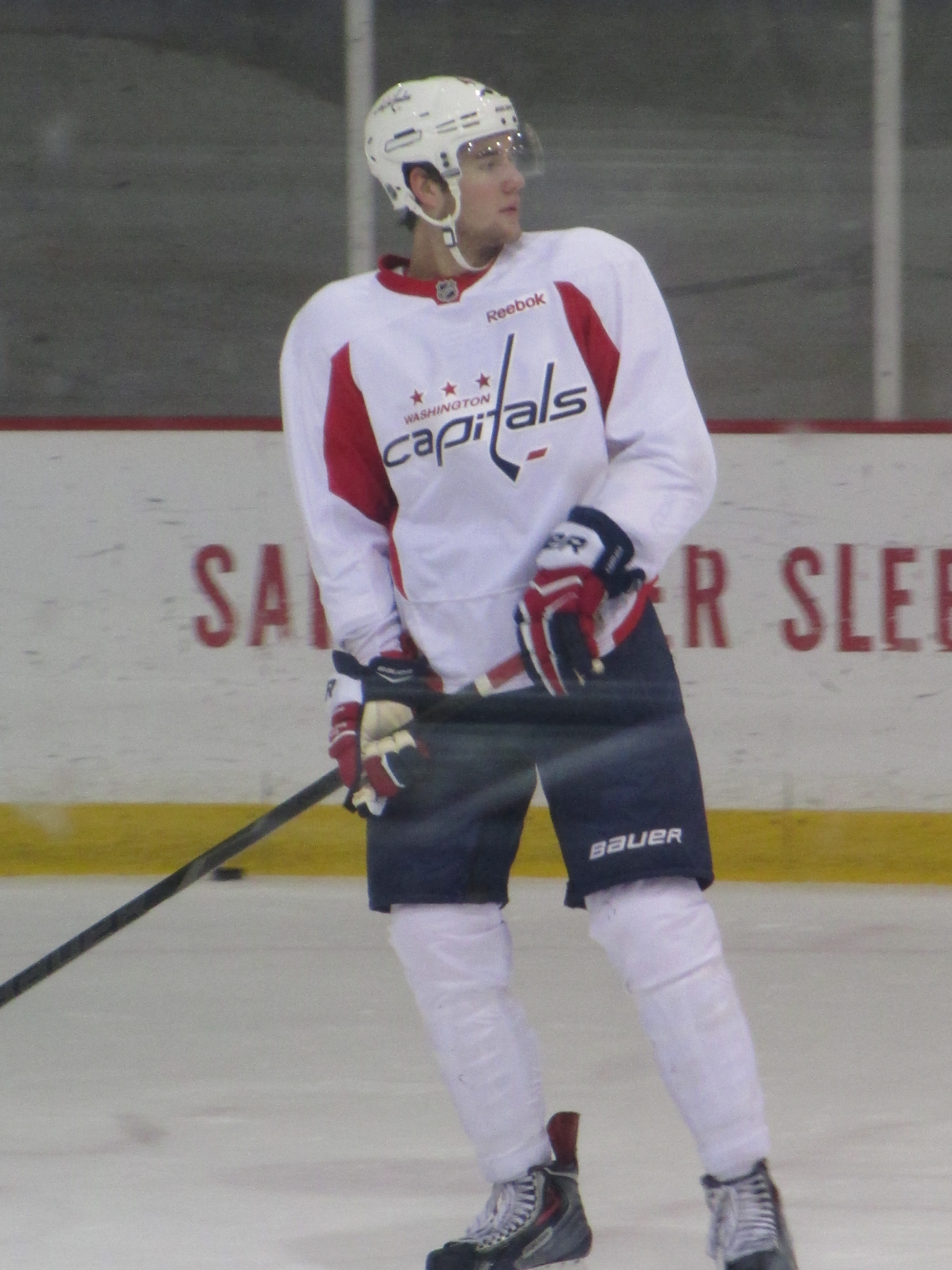
Wilson during Capitals practice in October 2013

Going into the 2013–14 season, the Capitals, who were struck by the NHL salary cap, appointed Wilson and fellow 19-year-old Connor Carrick to their roster in order to save money. Although he did not score a goal in his first 10 games, the Capitals chose to retain Wilson on their roster in order to fill the enforcer role that had been left vacant when Matt Hendricks chose to sign with the Nashville Predators. Wilson took part in his first NHL fight on October 3, 2013, battling Lance Bouma of the Calgary Flames and receiving a five-minute major penalty. His first goal came on November 6, scoring the last point in a 6–2 rout of the New York Islanders. Wilson's first serious hit as an enforcer came the following month, when he charged Brayden Schenn of the Philadelphia Flyers. Wilson was ejected from the game and received a call from the NHL Department of Player Safety for the incident, but did not receive any supplemental discipline. Wilson was one of only three NHL rookies that season to appear in all 82 games (besides Colorado Avalanche forward and Calder Memorial Trophy winner Nathan MacKinnon and Tampa Bay Lightning forward Tyler Johnson. In all 82 games played, Wilson recorded 10 points (three goals, seven assists) while participating in 14 fights and recording 151 penalty minutes as the Capitals narrowly missed the 2014 playoffs having just missed by three points.

Over the 2014 off-season, while preparing to return to the Capitals, Wilson suffered a broken left fibula. He underwent surgery on July 8, 2014, with no expected time frame for his return to the NHL. When he joined the team at the start of the season, it was only for non-contact practice, and he was briefly assigned to Hershey for a three-game rehab stint at the end of October. When he returned to the team in November, he was bumped up to the top offensive line with Nicklas Bäckström and captain Alexander Ovechkin replacing Troy Brouwer (who had played on the top line with Ovechkin and Bäckström the first month of the season and the previous three seasons prior), where he engaged in five fights through his first 13 games of the season. On March 27, 2015, Wilson received his first fine from the Department of Player Safety. After being warned for diving and embellishment on March 1 in a game against the Toronto Maple Leafs, Wilson was ordered to pay a $2,000 fine for the same penalty against Zach Parise of the Minnesota Wild. Wilson admitted, at the end of the 2014–15 season, that his leg injury in the previous off-season had affected his stamina throughout the season; in 67 games, he scored only 17 points while posting 172 penalty minutes, and he registered only one point in 13 games during the 2015 playoffs. Wilson also drew controversy during the playoffs for a hit on Ľubomír Višňovský of the Islanders in game four, who had to be removed from the game. Wilson did not receive any punishment besides a two-minute minor penalty, while Islanders captain John Tavares referred to the hit as "a complete target of a defenseless player". After Wilson and the Capitals defeated the fifth-seeded Islanders in the opening round in seven games, the Capitals would be defeated in seven games in the second round by the Presidents' Trophy–winning New York Rangers (despite initially having a 3–1 lead in the series at one point).

==== 2015–2019: Uprise in consistency and Stanley Cup title ====
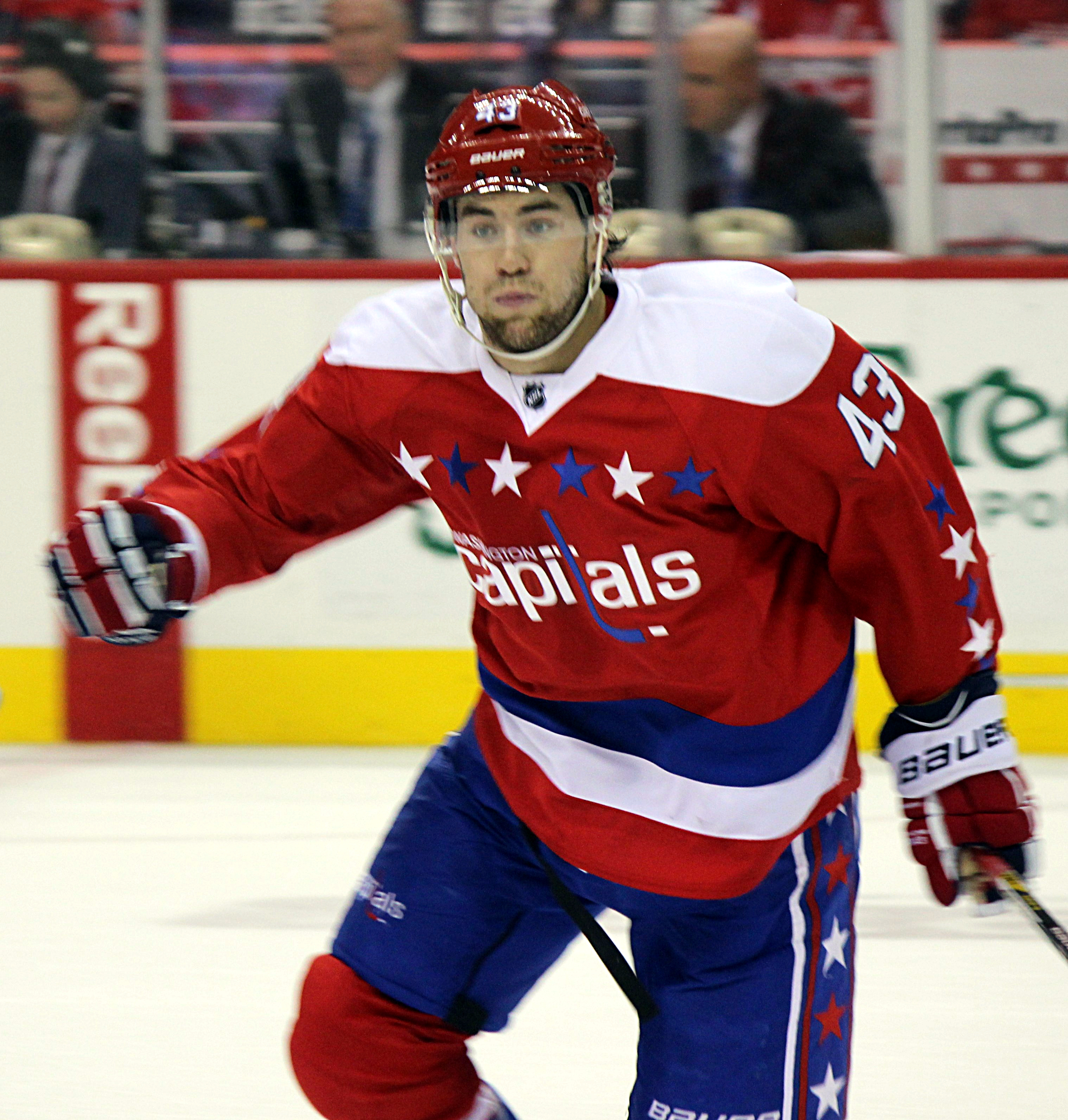
Wilson with the Capitals in March 2016

Wilson found consistency with the Capitals during the 2015–16 season, logging more minutes than in the first two seasons while being called upon for penalty kill situations. His aggressive style of play, meanwhile, continued to generate more controversy. On December 10, 2015, Wilson received a five-minute major penalty and a game misconduct for boarding Florida Panthers defenceman Brian Campbell, a hit that led to calls for additional punishment. On December 16, Wilson was given a match penalty for an illegal check to the head of Curtis Lazar of the Ottawa Senators. The penalty was rescinded upon further review after the league found that Wilson had initially made contact with Lazar's hip, and the apparent head injury was the result of whiplash. He finished the season playing in all 82 games with seven goals and 16 assists for 23 points to help the Capitals clinch the Presidents' Trophy as the regular season champions. On April 29, 2016, during the 2016 playoffs, Wilson was fined $2,403.67, the maximum amount allowable under the NHLPA Collective Bargaining Agreement, for a knee-on-knee collision with Conor Sheary of the Pittsburgh Penguins. The following day, he explained to reporters that the hit was an accidental result of a "bluff check" on Sheary. After playing on the third line for the regular season, he dropped to the fourth line for the playoffs, scoring one assist in all 12 games after the Capitals defeated the Philadelphia Flyers in the first round in six games before getting defeated in six games by the Penguins.

On June 30, 2016, the Capitals signed Wilson as a restricted free agent to a two-year, $4 million contract. He told reporters that his goal for the 2016–17 season was to shed his reputation as a physical player and focus more on improving his scoring production. On December 31, Wilson collided with New Jersey Devils defenceman John Moore, who was carried off the ice on a stretcher and was later hospitalized with a concussion. An NHL spokesman told reporters the next day that Wilson would not be fined or suspended for the hit. On January 13, 2017, Wilson recorded his first career three-point game in a 6–0 shutout win over the Chicago Blackhawks having recorded an assists on two goals by Jay Beagle and recording a goal on Blackhawks' goaltender Corey Crawford. Wilson's point production dropped during the 2016–17 campaign having recorded only 19 points (seven goals, 12 assists) in all 82 games. Despite this dip in individual production, the Capitals remained a dominant team as they clinched their second consecutive Presidents' Trophy and third in franchise history altogether. However, his performance at the 2017 playoffs surpassed previous playoff appearances, with three goals in four games against in six games in round one against his hometown team, the eighth-seeded Toronto Maple Leafs. After scoring the overtime-winning goal in game one, Wilson scored two goals in game four. The Capitals ultimately lost in the second round of the playoffs to the Penguins for the second consecutive season.

On September 23, 2017, he received a two-game preseason suspension for interference against Robert Thomas of the St. Louis Blues. Then, on October 1, in the Capitals' preseason finale, Wilson received a four-game suspension as a repeat offender for a hit on Blues forward Sammy Blais. When he returned to the line-up, Wilson found an offensive rhythm on the top line with Alexander Ovechkin and Nicklas Bäckström – in his first 13 games, he put up eight points and averaged nearly two minutes more of ice time per game than the season prior before eventually getting moved to the second line with Evgeny Kuznetsov and Jakub Vrána. On December 6, Wilson recorded his first career four-point game in a 6–2 win over the Chicago Blackhawks recording two goals (a goal on Blackhawks' goaltender Anton Forsberg and an empty net goal towards the end of the game) while also recording two assists on goals by Nicklas Bäckström and Alexander Ovechkin, respectively. By the end of the 2017–18 season, which saw the Capitals as a team finish first in the Metropolitan division for the third consecutive season, second in the East and fifth in the league overall, Wilson individually had set a career-high 14 goals and 21 assists in 78 games, but was also second in the league to Micheal Haley of the Florida Panthers with 187 penalty minutes. Wilson avoided a third suspension during the first game in the first round of the 2018 playoffs on April 12, 2018, when he charged Alexander Wennberg of the Columbus Blue Jackets. Department of Player Safety decided not to pursue further disciplinary action as they could not determine, based on the available cameras, whether Wilson's main point of contact was Wennberg's head. As the playoffs progressed after Wilson and the Capitals defeated the seventh-seeded Blue Jackets, Wilson's hits on his opponents continued to draw scrutiny. On April 29, in game two of the second round against the Pittsburgh Penguins, Wilson made contact with the head of Penguins defenceman Brian Dumoulin, forcing the latter to leave the game. Wilson's history of suspension, combined with a growing controversy over headshots during the NHL postseason, further heated the incident, which was eventually ruled an "unfortunate hockey play". In the next game on May 1, Wilson's shoulder collided with the head of Penguins rookie forward Zach Aston-Reese, giving the latter a concussion and a broken jaw that would require surgery causing him to miss the rest of the series. Wilson was labelled a "headhunter" and dirty player on social media, and received a three-game postseason suspension from the NHL. After the Capitals defeated the fourth-seeded and two time defending Stanley Cup champion Penguins in the second round in six games including (the final three games of which Wilson was absent for due to his suspension), Wilson would return in time for the start of the conference finals against the top-seeded Tampa Bay Lightning where they would go on to defeat the Lightning in seven games to clinch a spot in the 2018 Stanley Cup Final. Wilson delivered a final controversial hit of the season in game one of the Stanley Cup Final on May 28, on Jonathan Marchessault of the Vegas Golden Knights. Wilson received a minor penalty for what he declared "a good clean hit", while Marchessault argued that the hit should be reviewed. Wilson and the Capitals eventually defeated the second-seeded Golden Knights in five games for their first Stanley Cup victory in franchise history, recording 15 total points (five goals, 10 assists), with at least one point in 11 of the 21 playoff games in which he appeared in. This included two goals and one assist in the Cup Final. Wilson was one of several players asked to deliver a short speech during the Stanley Cup victory parade at the National Mall on June 12 following the Capitals' game five victory on June 7, saying, "They say what happens in Vegas stays in Vegas, but we brought the cup home." Wilson and the Capitals' successful postseason run was somewhat overshadowed by his second-round suspension, and Wilson thanked his teammates for supporting him through the "tough situation" and continuing in his absence.

Following his strong performance the previous season and during the Stanley Cup run, the Capitals re-signed Wilson to a six-year contract extension on July 27, 2018, with an average annual value of $5.17 million. On October 3, Wilson received a 20-game suspension for a preseason hit on Oskar Sundqvist of the St. Louis Blues. The impact of the hit, which left Sundqvist on the injured list, as well as the frequency of Wilson's suspensions, resulted in the long suspension length. The NHL referred to the incident, which was Wilson's fourth suspension in 105 games, as "unprecedented". Wilson attempted to appeal the league's decision, arguing that the head contact he made with Sundqvist was unavoidable, but the decision was upheld by NHL Commissioner Gary Bettman on October 25. Following Bettman's decision, Wilson filed an additional appeal from a neutral arbitrator, and had his suspension reduced to 14 games. Wilson was allowed to play with the Capitals on November 13 against the Minnesota Wild. In the first game after his suspension on November 13, Wilson scored a goal, drew a minor penalty for goaltender interference, and engaged in a fight with Wild skater Marcus Foligno. On November 30, only nine games after returning from his suspension, Wilson was ejected from a game against the New Jersey Devils for a late hit against Brett Seney. The match penalty received an automatic review, but Wilson faced no additional discipline from the Department of Player Safety. At the time of the hit, Wilson had scored seven goals in nine games and had extended his goal streak to five games. Wilson used his history of suspensions to change his approach to the ice, putting less emphasis on the physical aspect of his game and setting career highs with 22 goals and 18 assists for 40 points in 63 regular season games while playing on the top line with Alexander Ovechkin and Nicklas Bäckström as the Capitals as a team finished as the second seed in the conference for the second consecutive season. Wilson was named as the Capitals nominee for the King Clancy Memorial Trophy, given to a significant humanitarian contributor in the NHL but was not named a top three finalist by the NHL. As the defending Stanley Cup champion Capitals entered the 2019 playoffs, however, Wilson's teammates and coaches worried that his restrained approach could not continue among the heightened tensions of playoff hockey. One of the strongest hits that he delivered, elbowing Greg McKegg of the Carolina Hurricanes during game five of the first round on April 20, 2019, went without penalty. The seventh-seeded Hurricanes took the series with a double-overtime win in game seven.

==== 2019–present: Recent seasons ====
Wilson's shift towards point production over hits continued into the 2019–20 season, when, by the holiday break, he had reached a career high 0.68 points per game, alongside a career low 1.61 penalty minutes per game. By the time that the regular season was suspended in March due to the COVID-19 pandemic, Wilson was one goal shy of his career high, with 21 goals in 68 games followed by 23 assists for 44 points while spending the bulk of the season continuing to play on the first line with Nicklas Bäckström and Alexander Ovechkin. When the NHL returned to play for the 2020 playoffs in Toronto, Wilson was one of 31 Capitals invited to play in the "bubble". For the second year in a row, Washington failed to advance past the first round of playoffs, falling in five games to the New York Islanders.

The pandemic-shortened 2020–21 season brought more controversy for Wilson's playing style, beginning with a "very big, and very late" hit on Mark Jankowski of the Pittsburgh Penguins at the end of a February 25, 2021 game. This was followed by a hit on Brandon Carlo of the Boston Bruins on March 5, which resulted in Carlo being transported to the hospital in an ambulance. Bruins head coach Bruce Cassidy referred to the incident as a "predatory hit from a player who's done that before", while Carlo's teammate Brad Marchand referred to it as a "bullshit hit". Although referees did not call an on-ice penalty for the hit, the Department of Player Safety later suspended Wilson for seven games, requiring him to forfeit over $300,000 of his salary to the NHL Players' Emergency Assistance Fund. On May 4, the NHL and Department of Player Safety came under fire when they chose not to suspend Wilson for a fight against New York Rangers skaters Pavel Buchnevich and Artemi Panarin. Wilson first hit Buchnevich before removing Panarin's helmet and throwing him into the ice. Panarin was forced to miss the remainder of the season due to a leg injury, while the Rangers released a statement declaring George Parros, the head of the Department of Player Safety, "unfit to continue in his current role". The controversy was amplified when, the following day, Shayne Gostisbehere of the Philadelphia Flyers was suspended two games for a hit against Mark Friedman of the Penguins. Unlike Wilson, Gostisbehere had never before received an NHL suspension. On May 7, Wilson told reporters that he had reached out to Panarin and that he wished to move on from the incident. After scoring 13 goals and 20 assists for 33 points in 47 games while playing on the Capitals first line with Alexander Ovechkin and Evgeny Kuznetsov and leading the league in penalty minutes with 96 during the season, Wilson opened the scoring for the 2021 playoffs with a shot against Boston Bruins goaltender Tuukka Rask. That goal would be the only even-strength point drawn from one of the Capitals' top-six forwards as they fell to the Bruins in five games in the opening round.

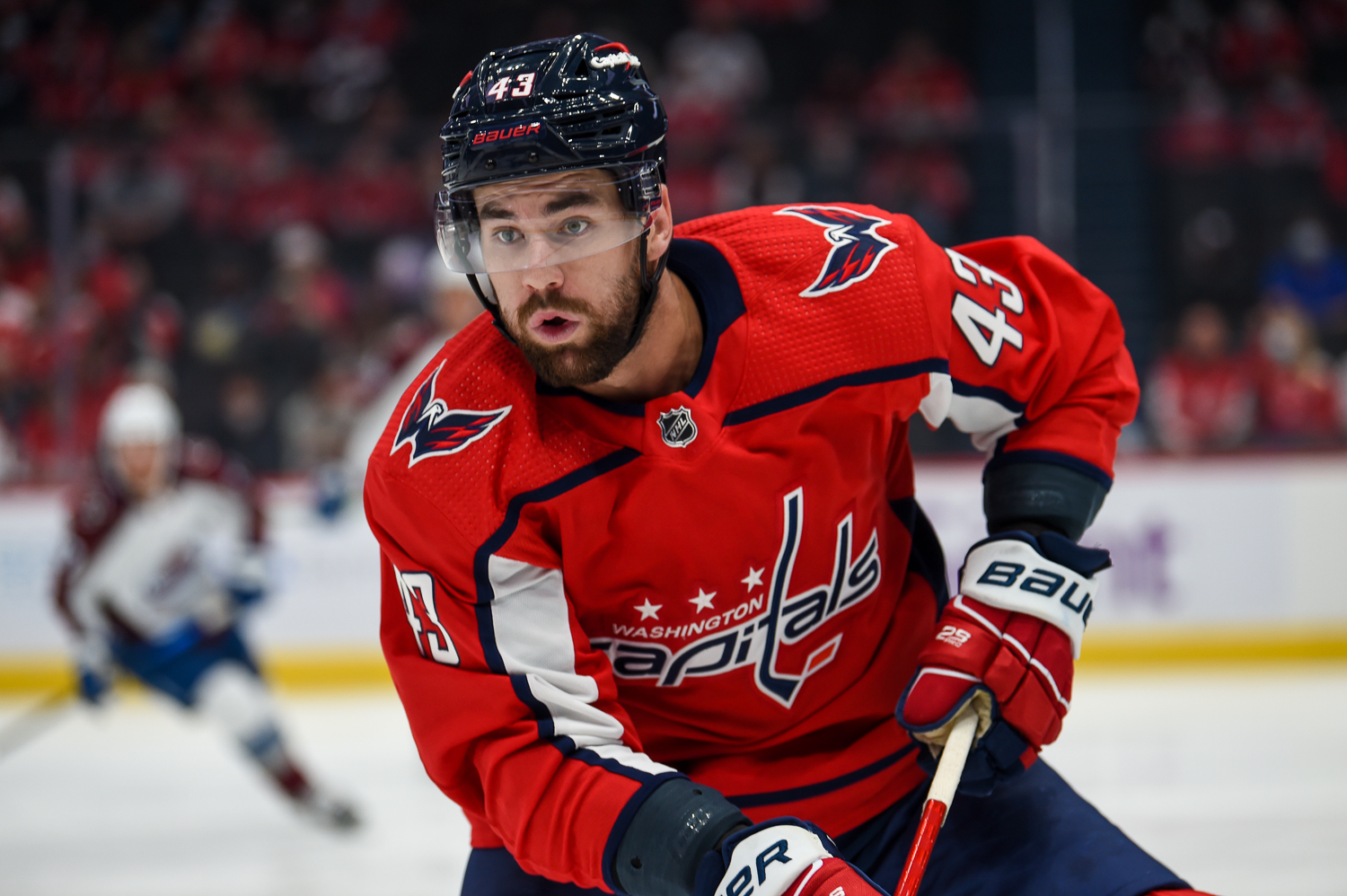
Wilson with the Capitals in October 2021

When captain Alexander Ovechkin was placed on COVID-19 protocols, Wilson, who had 13 goals and 18 assists for 31 points by the midway point of the 2021–22 season, was named as his replacement for the 2022 NHL All-Star Game. Wilson ended the season playing in 78 games with career highs in goals (24), assists (28) and points (52) while continuing his top line presence with Ovechkin and Kuznetsov. On May 3, 2022, in the first game in the first round of the 2022 playoffs against the Presidents' Trophy-winning Florida Panthers, Wilson suffered a torn ACL when attempting to deliver a check on Panthers' defenceman Mackenzie Weegar resulting in him missing the rest of the series where the Capitals would be defeated in six games by the Panthers in his absence.

Due to his knee injury in the 2022 playoffs, Wilson did not make his 2022–23 season debut until January 8, 2023, the 43rd game of the season in a 1–0 win over the Columbus Blue Jackets. He eventually ended the season with 13 goals and nine assists for 22 points in 33 games as the Capitals missed the 2023 playoffs by 12 points. This marked the first time since Wilson was a rookie in 2014 where the Capitals missed the playoffs.

On August 4, 2023, Wilson signed a seven-year, $45.5-million contract extension with the Capitals. On November 30, in his 700th career game, Wilson scored his first career hat trick in a 5–4 win over the Anaheim Ducks. Wilson was selected to play in the 2024 NHL All-Star Game. On March 22, 2024, Wilson was suspended for six games for high-sticking Toronto Maple Leafs forward Noah Gregor two days earlier. Wilson's individual production overall dipped as he ended the season with 18 goals, 17 assists and 35 points in 74 games. Despite his drop in production, the Capitals returned to the 2024 playoffs as the eighth seed in the Eastern Conference (after missing the year prior), but were swept in the first round by the Presidents' Trophy-winning New York Rangers.

Wilson opened the 2024–25 season scoring at least one goal in the first four games of a season with a goal each in game against the New Jersey Devils, Vegas Golden Knights and Dallas Stars along with a two-goal performance against the New Jersey Devils, becoming the fourth player in Capitals history (besides Alexander Ovechkin in 2013–14, Mike Gartner in 1987–88 and Dennis Maruk in 1979–80), to record at least one goal in the first four games of a season. Wilson recorded the first two Gordie Howe hat tricks of his NHL career during the campaign. The first was on October 31, 2024, in a 6–3 win over the Montreal Canadiens as he recorded a goal on Canadiens' goaltender Cayden Primeau, an assist on a goal by Connor McMichael, and got into a fight with Canadiens' forward Josh Anderson. The second was in a 5–4 home shootout victory over the Ottawa Senators on March 3, 2025, when he fought Brady Tkachuk in the first period, scored on a power play in the second, and assisted on a Martin Fehérváry goal in the third. On March 18, 2025, Wilson recorded his 30th goal of the season in a 4–1 win over the Detroit Red Wings, marking the first time in his career to hit the mark. On April 6, Wilson had the primary assist on Alexander Ovechkin's 895th career regular season goal, which broke Wayne Gretzky's all-time goal-scoring record.

On November 30, 2025, with two goals versus the New York Islanders, Wilson moved to 8th place in all-time Capitals scoring with 194 goals. After being named to the Canada men's national ice hockey team for the 2026 Winter Olympics, he achieved his third career Gordie Howe hat trick in a 6–3 home triumph over the New York Rangers on December 31, 2025. He scored in each of the second and third periods, fought Sam Carrick 100 seconds after his first tally, and assisted on the last goal of the game by Justin Sourdif.

== International play ==
Medal record

Men's ice hockey

Representing Canada

Olympic Games
Silver medal – second place	2026 Milano Cortina	

World U-17 Hockey Challenge
Gold medal – first place	2011 Winnipeg	

Ivan Hlinka Memorial Tournament
Gold medal – first place	2011 Břeclav and Piešťany	

Wilson first represented Canada internationally at the 2011 World U-17 Hockey Challenge. Playing on the gold medal-winning Canada Ontario team, Wilson injured his wrist on a breakaway, leaving Mathew Campagna to take a penalty shot in the 5–3 win over the United States. In four games at the U-17 tournament, Wilson scored one assist and recorded six penalty minutes. That same year, Wilson represented Canada at the 2011 Ivan Hlinka Memorial Tournament, capturing another gold medal with three goals in five games.

=== 2026 Winter Olympics ===
On December 31, 2025, he was named to Canada's roster to compete at the 2026 Winter Olympics.

Ahead of their first game in the Olympics, Wilson and the rest of the team watched members of Team Canada compete in speed-skating.

For several group games, head coach Jon Cooper placed Wilson on the top line alongside Connor McDavid and Macklin Celebrini, as a means of spreading out Canada's deep depth in offensive prowess over several lines. Wilson's presence in the offensive zone and delivering numerous hits were credited with allowing his linemates to get possession of the puck and deliver offensively; McDavid and Celebrini were later named to the tournament all-star team. In Canada's 10–2 win over France on 15 February 2026, during the third period Wilson completed a Gordie Howe hat trick (believed to be the first one in Olympic hockey) when he fought French player Pierre Crinon in retaliation for Crinon's forearm hit to Nathan MacKinnon's jaw earlier in the game. Wilson and Crinon were both ejected from the game for fighting. France later suspended Crinon for jeering the crowd as he left the ice. Crinon is now facing legal action for another on-ice incident that was reopened in response to the fight with Wilson.

In the semifinal against Finland, Wilson was placed on the "Rat Line" of agitators with Sam Bennett and Brad Marchand, and though the trio didn't score, their hits and forechecking were credited with helping Canada to come back from a 0–2 deficit to win 3–2. In the final against the United States, the Americans ultimately prevailed 2–1 in overtime to win the gold medal.

Wilson finished the tournament with one goal and three assists. He also set the Canadian record for the most penalty minutes (29) in a single Olympic tournament involving NHL players, having received 2 minutes for high-sticking and 27 minutes due to his ejection after the fight with France's Pierre Crinon.

== Playing style and criticism ==
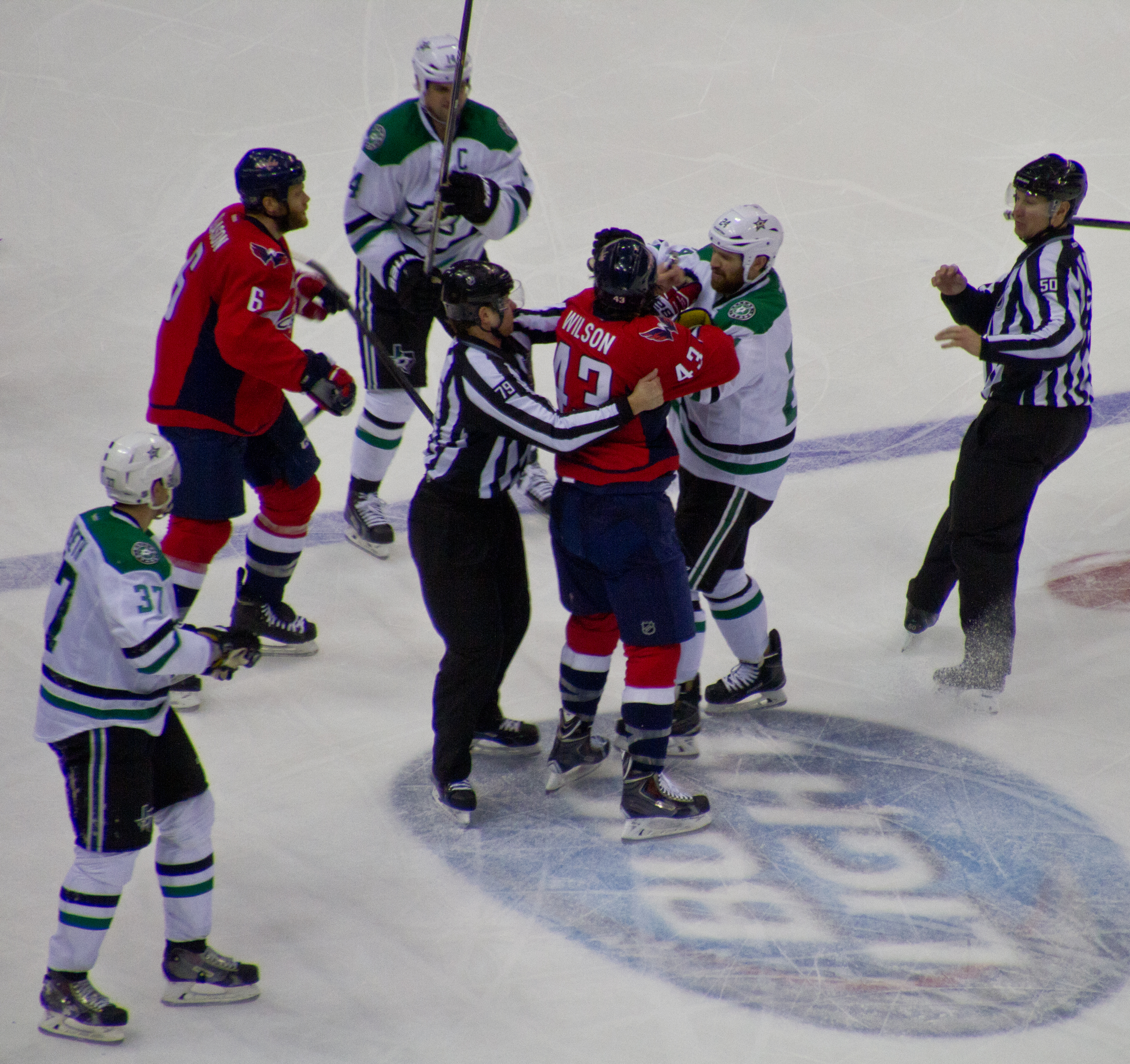
An altercation between Wilson and Jordie Benn during a game against the Dallas Stars

Wilson, standing 6 feet 4 inches (1.93 m) and weighing 218 pounds (99 kg), has been described as a power forward, with a strong scoring record and a highly physical approach to the ice. Wilson's teammate on the Capitals, forward Brendan Leipsic, has said that Wilson's size gives the hits that he makes on opponents a distinctive "crunch", telling reporters that Wilson's particular danger lies not just in his size but the pace with which he attacks. He has also been described as an enforcer and a "goon", particularly in response to his May 2021 hit on Artemi Panarin. Wilson's physically-intensive style of play has been criticized by opponents and sports journalists as an artifact of an older era of NHL play. Stu Grimson, a former NHL enforcer, said, "If you put Tom Wilson back in the '90s, the early '80s, he's just one tough son of a bitch and no one thinks twice. But the game has evolved." A 2021 poll found that Wilson was the most hated NHL player on social media, with 47.9 percent of his impressions trending negative and 15.3 percent categorized as neutral.

Within the Capitals, Wilson has found a role as a defensive-minded forward to clear the way for linemates like Alexander Ovechkin and Evgeny Kuznetsov. As a rookie playing on the fourth line, Wilson was primarily tasked with defending his teammates by initiating fights with opponents, but as his offensive skill progressed and fighting became less frequent in the NHL, Wilson became more selective about his fights, believing that he was more valuable on the ice than serving a penalty. Most of Wilson's disciplinary history came in a streak: between the 2017 and 2018 preseasons, he served four suspensions in 105 games, and then avoided suspension again until March 2021.

== Personal life ==
Wilson is married to professional beach volleyball player Taylor Pischke. The couple began dating in 2015 after meeting at one of Pischke's volleyball tournaments, and became engaged on July 23, 2021. They were married on August 27, 2022. In 2020, shortly before the COVID-19 pandemic forced the suspension of the NHL season, the couple adopted a Labrador Retriever puppy named Halle.

On May 23, 2024 he and his wife welcomed their first child.

=== Charity work ===
Wilson has been active in charity work across the mid-Atlantic, including the Make-A-Wish Foundation, Teammates for Kids Foundation, Homeward Trails Animal Rescue, and Hockey Fights Cancer. During the 2018–19 NHL season, Wilson launched a partner program with Make-A-Wish called Forty Three's Friends, which offers Capitals game tickets to Make-A-Wish children and involves a personal meet-and-greet with Wilson after the game. The following year, he expanded the program to include veterans from the United Heroes League. In 2019, the Capitals nominated Wilson for the King Clancy Memorial Trophy, given to a significant humanitarian contributor in the NHL.

== Career statistics ==
=== Regular season and playoffs ===
Bold indicates led league

			Regular season					Playoffs
Season	Team	League	GP	G	A	Pts	PIM	GP	G	A	Pts	PIM
2009–10	Toronto Jr. Canadiens	GTHL	77	44	61	105	140	—	—	—	—	—
2010–11	Plymouth Whalers	OHL	28	3	3	6	71	—	—	—	—	—
2011–12	Plymouth Whalers	OHL	49	9	18	27	141	13	7	6	13	39
2012–13	Plymouth Whalers	OHL	48	23	35	58	104	12	9	8	17	41
2012–13	Hershey Bears	AHL	—	—	—	—	—	3	1	0	1	6
2012–13	Washington Capitals	NHL	—	—	—	—	—	3	0	0	0	0
2013–14	Washington Capitals	NHL	82	3	7	10	151	—	—	—	—	—
2014–15	Washington Capitals	NHL	67	4	13	17	172	13	0	1	1	25
2014–15	Hershey Bears	AHL	2	0	0	0	0	—	—	—	—	—
2015–16	Washington Capitals	NHL	82	7	16	23	163	12	0	1	1	13
2016–17	Washington Capitals	NHL	82	7	12	19	133	13	3	0	3	34
2017–18	Washington Capitals	NHL	78	14	21	35	187	21	5	10	15	31
2018–19	Washington Capitals	NHL	63	22	18	40	128	7	3	2	5	2
2019–20	Washington Capitals	NHL	68	21	23	44	93	8	1	2	3	23
2020–21	Washington Capitals	NHL	47	13	20	33	**96**	5	1	1	2	6
2021–22	Washington Capitals	NHL	78	24	28	52	98	1	1	0	1	0
2022–23	Washington Capitals	NHL	33	13	9	22	78	—	—	—	—	—
2023–24	Washington Capitals	NHL	74	18	17	35	133	4	1	2	3	16
2024–25	Washington Capitals	NHL	81	33	32	65	100	10	3	4	7	14
2025–26	Washington Capitals	NHL	72	30	32	62	117	—	—	—	—	—
NHL totals			907	209	248	457	1,649	97	18	23	41	164

=== International ===
Year	Team	Event	Result	GP	G	A	Pts	PIM
2011	Canada Ontario	U17	1st place, gold medalist(s)	4	0	1	1	6
2011	Canada	IH18	1st place, gold medalist(s)	5	1	2	3	6
2026	Canada	OG	2nd place, silver medalist(s)	6	1	3	4	29
Junior totals				9	1	3	4	12
Senior totals				6	1	3	4	29

== Awards and honours ==
Award	Year	Ref
OHL
CHL/NHL Top Prospects Game	2011–12	
NHL
Stanley Cup champion	2018	
NHL All-Star Game	2022, 2024	

Awards and achievements
Preceded by Filip Forsberg	Washington Capitals first-round draft pick 2012	Succeeded by André Burakovsky
