= Guillaume Leclerc =

French ice hockey player

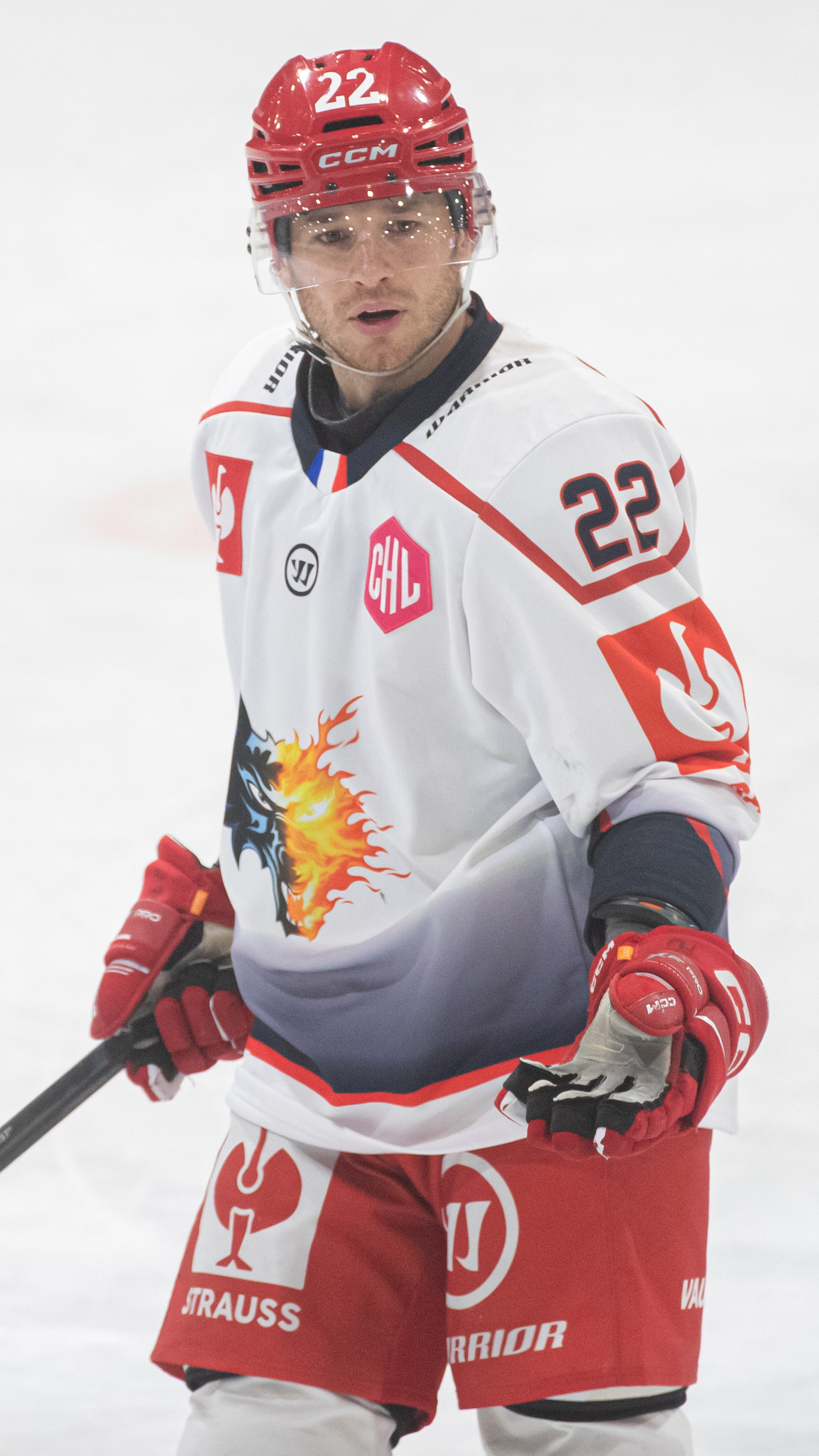
- Leclerc in 2025
- Born: 20 February 1996 (age 29); Besançon, France
- Height: 1.73 m (5 ft 8 in)
- Weight: 80 kg (176 lb; 12 st 8 lb)
- Position: Centre
- Shoots: Left
- Ligue Magnus team Former teams: Brûleurs de Loups; HK Poprad; Gothiques d'Amiens; Rødovre Mighty Bulls; HK Olimpija; Östersunds IK; Fehérvár AV19
- National team: France
- NHL draft: Undrafted
- Playing career: 2017–present

Guillaume Leclerc (born 20 February 1996) is a French professional ice hockey player for Brûleurs de Loups of the Ligue Magnus.

He represented France at the 2019 IIHF World Championship.
