= Bartosz Fraszko =

Polish ice hockey player (born 1995)

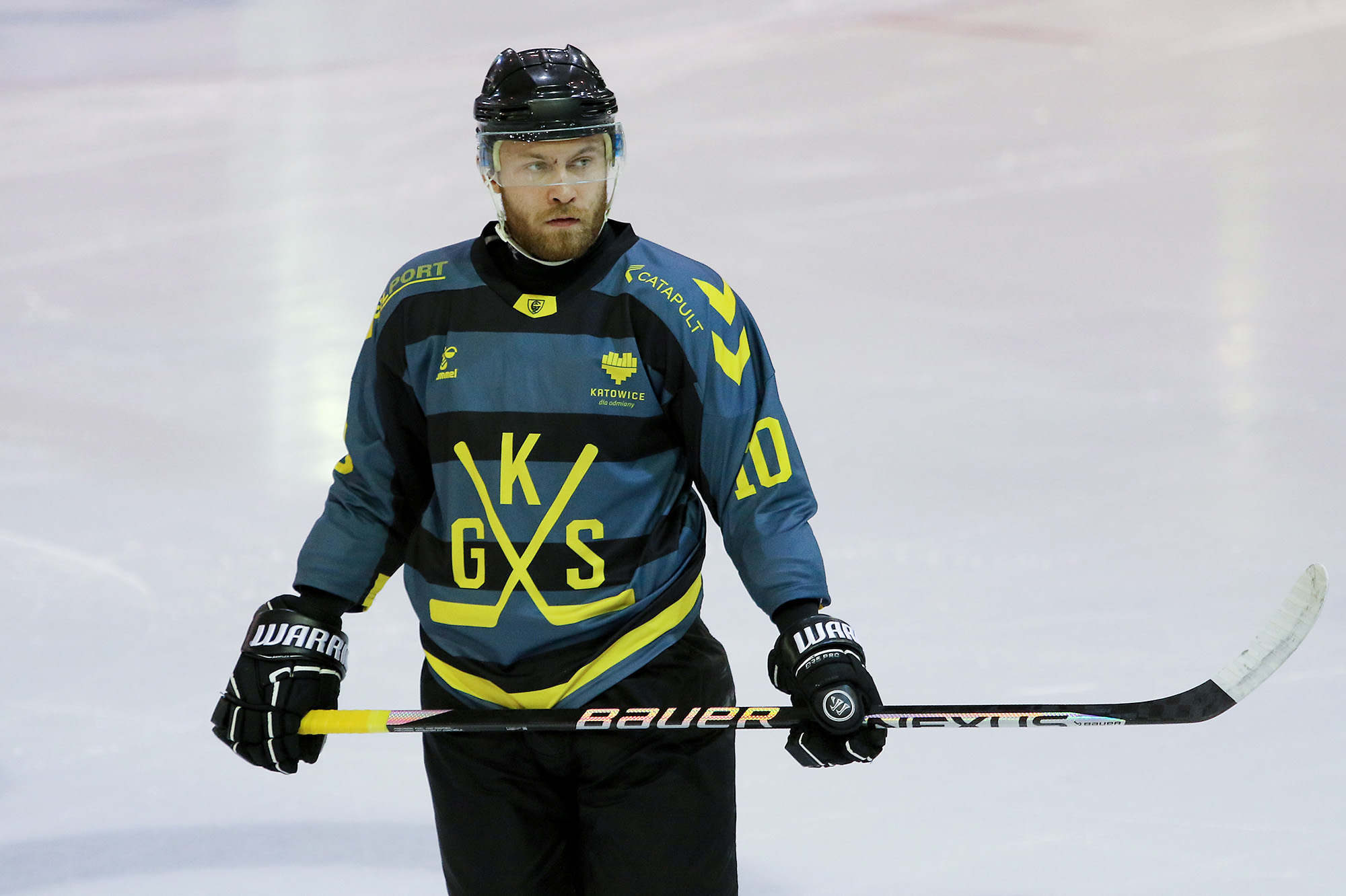
- Bartosz Fraszko with GKS Katowice (2022)
- Born: October 26, 1995 (age 30) Toruń, Poland
- Height: 182 cm (6 ft 0 in)
- Position: Forward
- Shoots: Left
- PHL team: GKS Katowice
- National team: Poland

Bartosz Fraszko (born 26 October 1995 in Toruń) is a Polish ice hockey player and a member of the Poland men's national ice hockey team.

His father, Adam, and his uncle, Robert, were also ice hockey players.

== Club career ==
- (Poland) SMS PZHL Sosnowiec|SMS II Sosnowiec / SMS I Sosnowiec (2013-2014)
- (Poland) MKS Sokoły Toruń (-2014)
- (Poland) Cracovia (2014-2015)
- (Poland) Nesta Mires Toruń (2015-2017)
- (Poland) Tauron KH GKS Katowice (2017-2019)
- (Poland) KH Energa Toruń (2019-2020)
- (Poland) GKS Katowice (2020-)

Fraszko was raised in the MKS Sokoły Toruń club. He graduated from NLO SMS PZHL Sosnowiec in 2014. In June 2014, he joined Cracovia. In September 2015, he returned to his hometown club in Toruń. In May 2017, he joined GKS Katowice. After the 2018/2019 season, he left the club. In May 2019, he became a player of KH Energa Toruń. In 2020, he returned to GKS Katowice.

== International career ==
He represented Poland at the U18 World Championships in 2013 (Division I). He also played for Poland at the U20 World Championships in 2014 and 2015 (Division I). During the 2014 tournament in December 2013, he was named the best player in the match against Denmark (the winning team of the tournament). During the 2015 tournament in December 2014, he was named the best player in the match against Japan.
