= Kristian Khenkel =

Belarusian ice hockey player

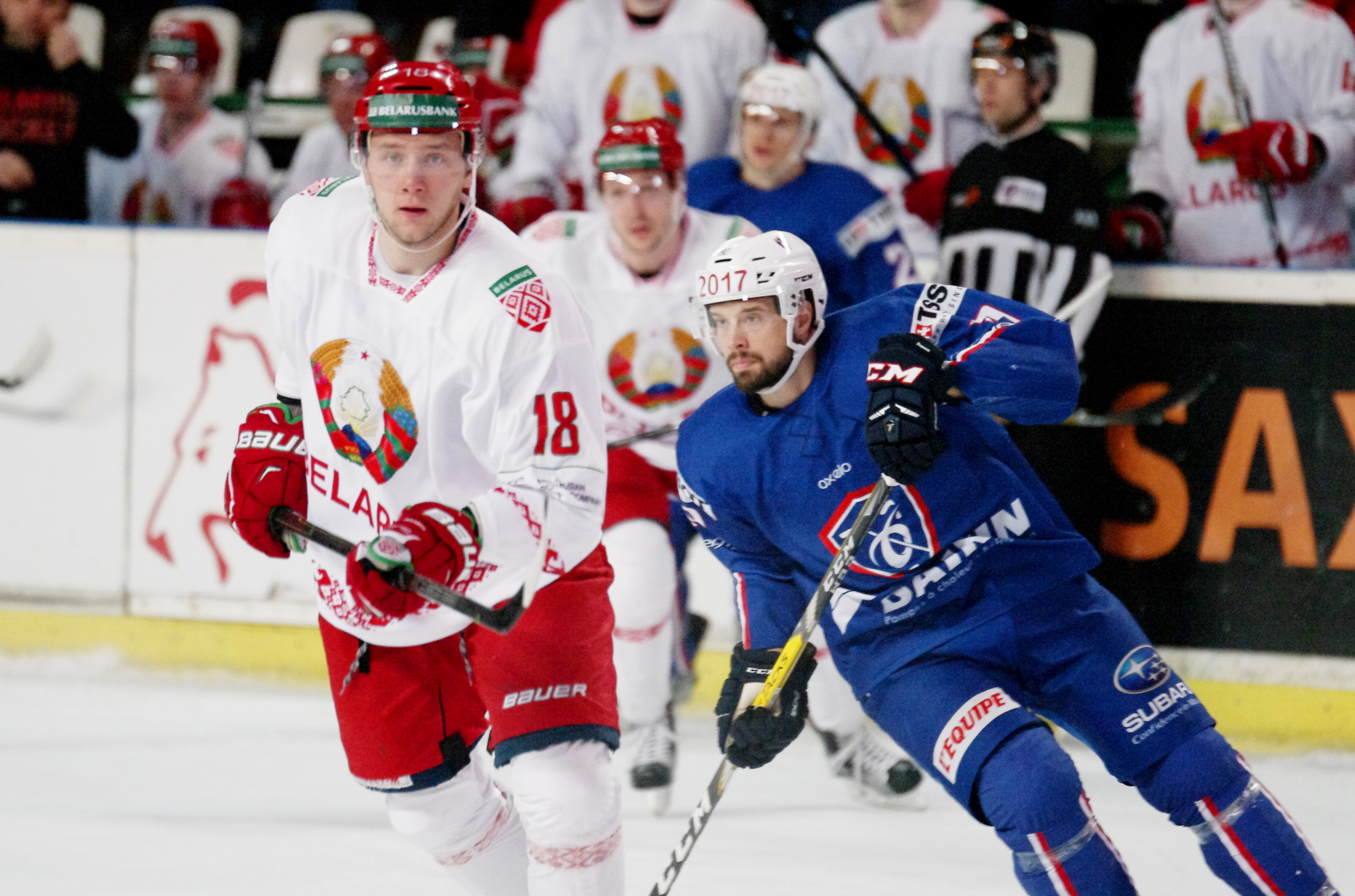
- Born: 7 November 1995 (age 30) Minsk, Belarus
- Height: 6 ft 1 in (185 cm)
- Weight: 198 lb (90 kg; 14 st 2 lb)
- Position: Defence
- Shoots: Left
- KHL team Former teams: Free agent Dinamo Minsk; Ak Bars Kazan; Barys Astana
- National team: Belarus
- NHL draft: Undrafted
- Playing career: 2012–present

Kristian Khenkel (Belarusian: Крыстыян Гэнкель; born 7 November 1995) is a Belarusian professional ice hockey defenceman who is currently an unrestricted free agent. He most recently played for HC Dinamo Minsk in the Kontinental Hockey League (KHL).

Khenkel previously played in the KHL for Ak Bars Kazan and Barys Astana. as well as in his native Belarusian Extraleague with Yunost Minsk.

Khenkel is also a member of the Belarusian national team and participated in the 2016, 2017 and 2018 IIHF World Championship.
