= Péter Vincze =

Hungarian ice hockey player (born 1995)

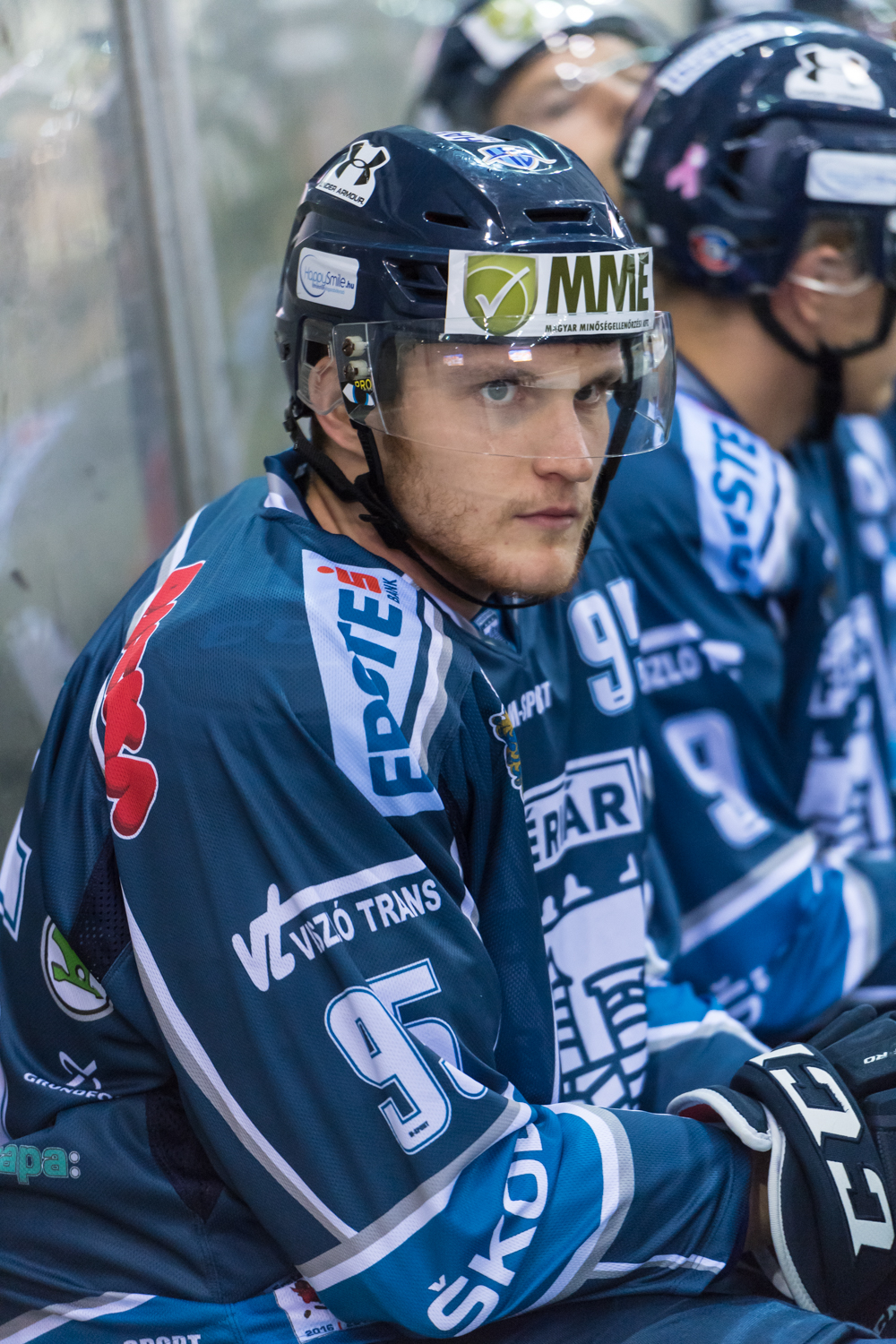
- Born: 16 February 1995 (age 31) Székesfehérvár, Hungary
- Height: 180 cm (5 ft 11 in)
- Weight: 85 kg (187 lb; 13 st 5 lb)
- Position: Forward
- Catches: Right
- Erste team Former teams: Újpesti TE; Fehérvár AV19; DVTK Jegesmedvék
- National team: Hungary
- Playing career: 2013–present

Péter Vincze (born 16 February 1995) is a Hungarian professional ice hockey player who is a forward for Újpesti TE of the Erste Liga.
