= Alex Lambacher =

Italian ice hockey player

- Born: October 7, 1996 (age 29) Brixen, Italy
- Height: 6 ft 3 in (191 cm)
- Weight: 198 lb (90 kg; 14 st 2 lb)
- Position: Forward
- Shoots: Right
- DEL2 team Former teams: Heilbronner Falken; Adler Mannheim; Augsburger Panther
- National team: Italy
- NHL draft: Undrafted
- Playing career: 2016–present

Alex Lambacher (born October 7, 1996) is an Italian professional ice hockey forward who is currently under contract with the Heilbronner Falken of the DEL2. He has played internationally with the Italian national team.

== Playing career ==
After playing a junior season in the North American Hockey League, Lambacher agreed to a two-year contract with German club, Adler Mannheim of the DEL, on July 22, 2016.

Lambacher played just 5 games through his contract with Mannheim, featuring primarily in the DEL2. On June 6, 2019, he signed as a free agent to a one-year contract with Augsburger Panther.

== International play ==
He participated at the 2017 IIHF World Championship for Italy.
