= Ivan Tauferer =

Italian ice hockey player

- Born: 26 January 1995 (age 31) Bolzano, Italy
- Height: 1.90 m (6 ft 3 in)
- Weight: 93 kg (205 lb; 14 st 9 lb)
- Position: Defence
- Shot: Right
- Played for: Ritten Sport; HC Eppan; HC Bolzano
- National team: Italy
- Playing career: 2012–2022

Ivan Tauferer (born 26 January 1995) is an Italian former professional ice hockey player, who last played for HC Bolzano in the ICE Hockey League; he also played for the Italian national team.

He represented Italy at the 2019 IIHF World Championship.

Tauferer retired at the end of the 2021-2022 season due to a wrist injury.
