= Maurin Bouvet =

French ice hockey player

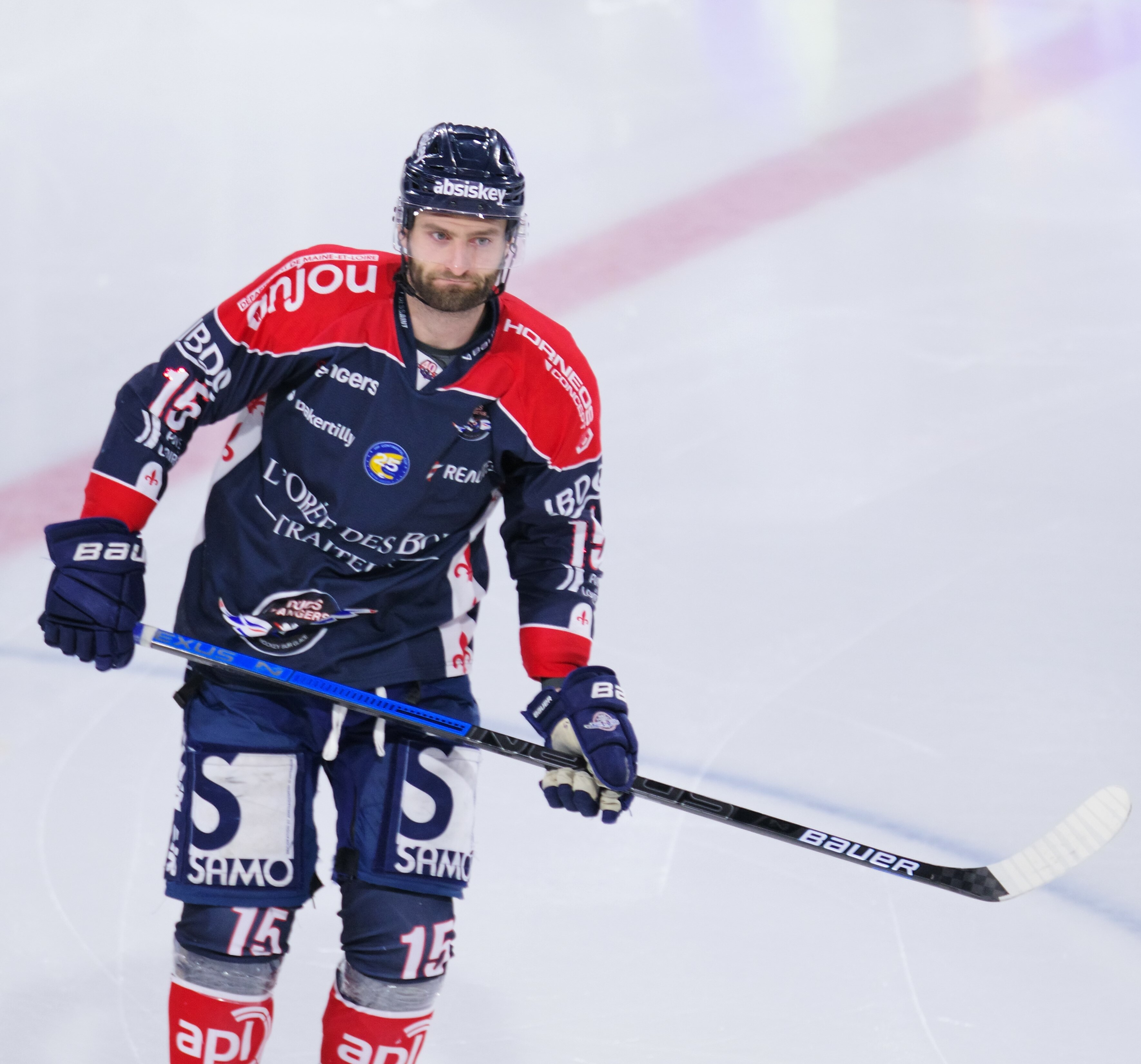
- Born: May 28, 1995 (age 29); Amiens, France
- Height: 5 ft 11 in (180 cm)
- Weight: 174 lb (79 kg; 12 st 6 lb)
- Position: Forward
- Shoots: Left
- LM team Former teams: Rapaces de Gap; Gothiques d'Amiens
- National team: France
- Playing career: 2012–present

Maurin Bouvet (born May 28, 1995) is a French ice hockey player for Rapaces de Gap and the French national team.

He participated at the 2017 IIHF World Championship.
