= Pierre Crinon =

French ice hockey player (born 1995)

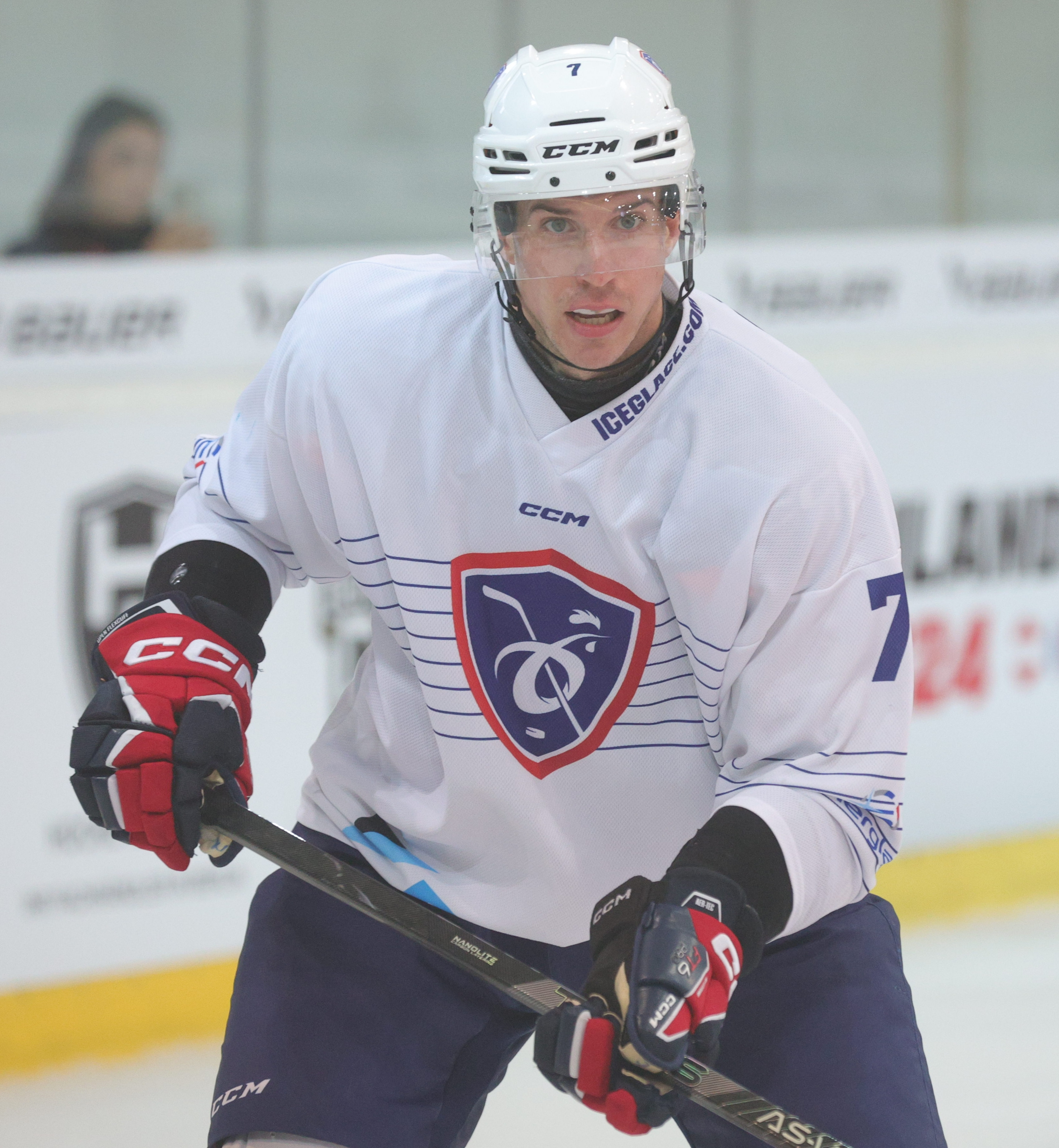
- Born: 2 August 1995 (age 30) Reims, France
- Height: 1.95 m (6 ft 5 in)
- Weight: 99 kg (218 lb; 15 st 8 lb)
- Position: Defence
- Shoots: Left
- LM team Former teams: Brûleurs de Loups; Diables Rouges de Briançon; Ducs de Dijon; Sioux City Musketeers; Corpus Christi IceRays; Rapaces de Gap; Dragons de Rouen; HK Dukla Trenčín
- National team: France
- NHL draft: Undrafted
- Playing career: 2012–present

Pierre Crinon (born 2 August 1995) is a French professional ice hockey player who is a defenceman for Brûleurs de Loups of the Ligue Magnus.

== Playing career ==
On 30 November 2025, Crinon punched Ducs d'Angers goaltender Matt O'Connor and received a seven-game suspension.

On 18 March 2026, Crinon was suspended eight games for slew-footing Briançon forward Kohei Sato during a quarter final matchup on 14 March 2026.

== International play ==
He represented France at the 2019 IIHF World Championship. He also represented France at the 2026 Winter Olympics, where he made one assist. In a controversial move, after engaging in a fight with Tom Wilson during their 10–2 loss against Canada, Crinon was suspended for the remainder of the Olympics by the French Ice Hockey Federation. In defence of their action, the federation cited Crinon's "provocative behaviour upon leaving the ice," saying it ran counter to "the Olympic spirit." The suspension was called "the most idiotic thing I have seen so far at the Olympics" by Canadian hockey commentator Jamie McLennan, while Cronin's fellow French national team player Hugo Gallet said that it was unfair and "biased by something that happened before".

Contrary to the reaction of the French Federation, the Globe and Mail newspaper in Canada called the fight a "bonding moment" at the Olympic Games. The head of the French federation later admitted that the suspension was due in part to their frustration that the fight had dominated the news coverage of Olympic hockey in France, rather than the more global results of the French team, which had not appeared in the Olympics in more than twenty years and had then failed to reach the rounds in which the team could compete for a medal once again.

== Career statistics ==
=== Regular season and playoffs ===
			Regular season					Playoffs
Season	Team	League	GP	G	A	Pts	PIM	GP	G	A	Pts	PIM
2012–13	Diables Rouges de Briançon	FRA	18	0	2	2	12	6	0	0	0	0
2013–14	Ducs de Dijon	FRA	21	0	1	1	31	8	0	0	0	2
2014–15	Sioux City Musketeers	USHL	1	0	0	0	0	—	—	—	—	—
2014–15	Corpus Christi IceRays	NAHL	42	3	7	10	108	2	0	0	0	4
2015–16	Rapaces de Gap	FRA	18	0	3	3	24	11	0	2	2	44
2016–17	Rapaces de Gap	FRA	23	1	7	8	20	16	1	2	3	16
2017–18	Rapaces de Gap	FRA	42	1	5	6	88	4	0	0	0	4
2018–19	Rapaces de Gap	FRA	22	1	5	6	58	10	0	3	3	8
2019–20	Dragons de Rouen	FRA	33	5	12	17	42	1	0	0	0	0
2020–21	Dragons de Rouen	FRA	22	1	10	11	30	—	—	—	—	—
2021–22	HK Dukla Trenčín	Slovak	28	0	3	3	99	—	—	—	—	—
2021–22	Brûleurs de Loups	FRA	10	2	7	9	32	13	1	1	2	60
2022–23	Brûleurs de Loups	FRA	23	0	8	8	39	13	0	4	4	38
2023–24	Brûleurs de Loups	FRA	36	0	10	10	95	9	0	3	3	6
2024–25	Brûleurs de Loups	FRA	7	1	2	3	4	13	0	3	3	11
2025–26	Brûleurs de Loups	FRA	36	2	8	10	70	8	1	1	2	31
Slovak totals			28	0	3	3	99	—	—	—	—	—
Ligue Magnus totals			311	14	81	95	545	112	3	19	22	220

=== International ===
Year	Team	Event	Result	GP	G	A	Pts	PIM
2019	France	WC	15th	3	0	0	0	2
2022	France	WC	12th	7	0	0	0	4
2023	France	WC	12th	7	0	0	0	4
2024	France	WC	14th	7	0	0	0	4
2025	France	WC	16th	7	0	1	1	2
2026	France	OG	11th	3	0	1	1	33
Senior totals				34	0	2	2	49
