= 2003–04 Calgary Flames season =

NHL team season

2003–04 Calgary Flames
- Western Conference champions
- Division: 3rd Northwest
- Conference: 6th Western
- 2003–04 record: 42–30–7–3
- Home record: 21–14–5–1
- Road record: 21–16–2–2
- Goals for: 200
- Goals against: 176

Team information
- General manager: Darryl Sutter
- Coach: Darryl Sutter
- Captain: Jarome Iginla
- Alternate captains: Craig Conroy; Robyn Regehr
- Arena: Pengrowth Saddledome
- Average attendance: 16,580
- Minor league affiliates: Lowell Lock Monsters; Las Vegas Wranglers

Team leaders
- Goals: Jarome Iginla (41)
- Assists: Craig Conroy (39)
- Points: Jarome Iginla (73)
- Penalty minutes: Krzysztof Oliwa (247)
- Plus/minus: Jarome Iginla (+21)
- Wins: Miikka Kiprusoff (24)
- Goals against average: Miikka Kiprusoff (1.69)

The 2003–04 Calgary Flames season was the 24th National Hockey League (NHL) season in Calgary, and the 32nd for the franchise in the NHL. The Flames ended a seven-year playoff drought, qualifying for the post-season for the first time since 1996. The Flames defeated three division winners en route to an appearance in the 2004 Stanley Cup Finals. The Flames were defeated in the finals by the Tampa Bay Lightning in seven games. The run to the finals captured the imagination of the city, while the Red Mile celebrations gained international attention for the "Mardi Gras-like" atmosphere as up to 80,000 people celebrated in the streets after each playoff game.

Head coach Darryl Sutter succeeded Craig Button as the Flames' general manager. Sutter made numerous changes to the roster as he worked to remake the Flames into a fast, physical club. Chris Drury was dealt to the Buffalo Sabres for Rhett Warrener and Steve Reinprecht before the season began. A knee injury to starting goaltender Roman Turek led Sutter to trade for Miikka Kiprusoff, a player he knew from his days with the San Jose Sharks. Kiprusoff responded to the deal by posting an NHL record low goals against average of 1.69.

The Flames were led offensively by Jarome Iginla, who tied Ilya Kovalchuk and Rick Nash for the league lead with 41 goals as the trio shared the Rocket Richard Trophy. Iginla represented the Flames at the 54th National Hockey League All-Star Game in Minnesota, and was named a second team all-star for his performance during the season. Iginla's charity work and leadership both on and off the ice led to his also being awarded the King Clancy Memorial Trophy and NHL Foundation Player Award.

== Regular season ==
The team started with an injury to starting goaltender Roman Turek in the first game of the season, an early November trade for San Jose Sharks third stringer Miikka Kiprusoff sparked the Flames, as Kiprusoff led Calgary into the playoffs for the first time in eight years.

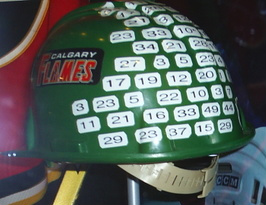
The Calgary Flames' green hard hat on display at the Hockey Hall of Fame.

Defenceman Mike Commodore became a cult hero for his unruly red mop of hair during the playoffs, leading many fans to wear red afro wigs to playoff games. Craig Conroy brought a team building idea from his days with the St. Louis Blues, having the team award a green hard hat to the hardest working player each time the Flames won. As the exercise gained popularity, fans also began wearing green hard hats to the arena themselves.

The Flames allowed the fewest short-handed goals during the regular season, with just 2.

=== Season standings ===
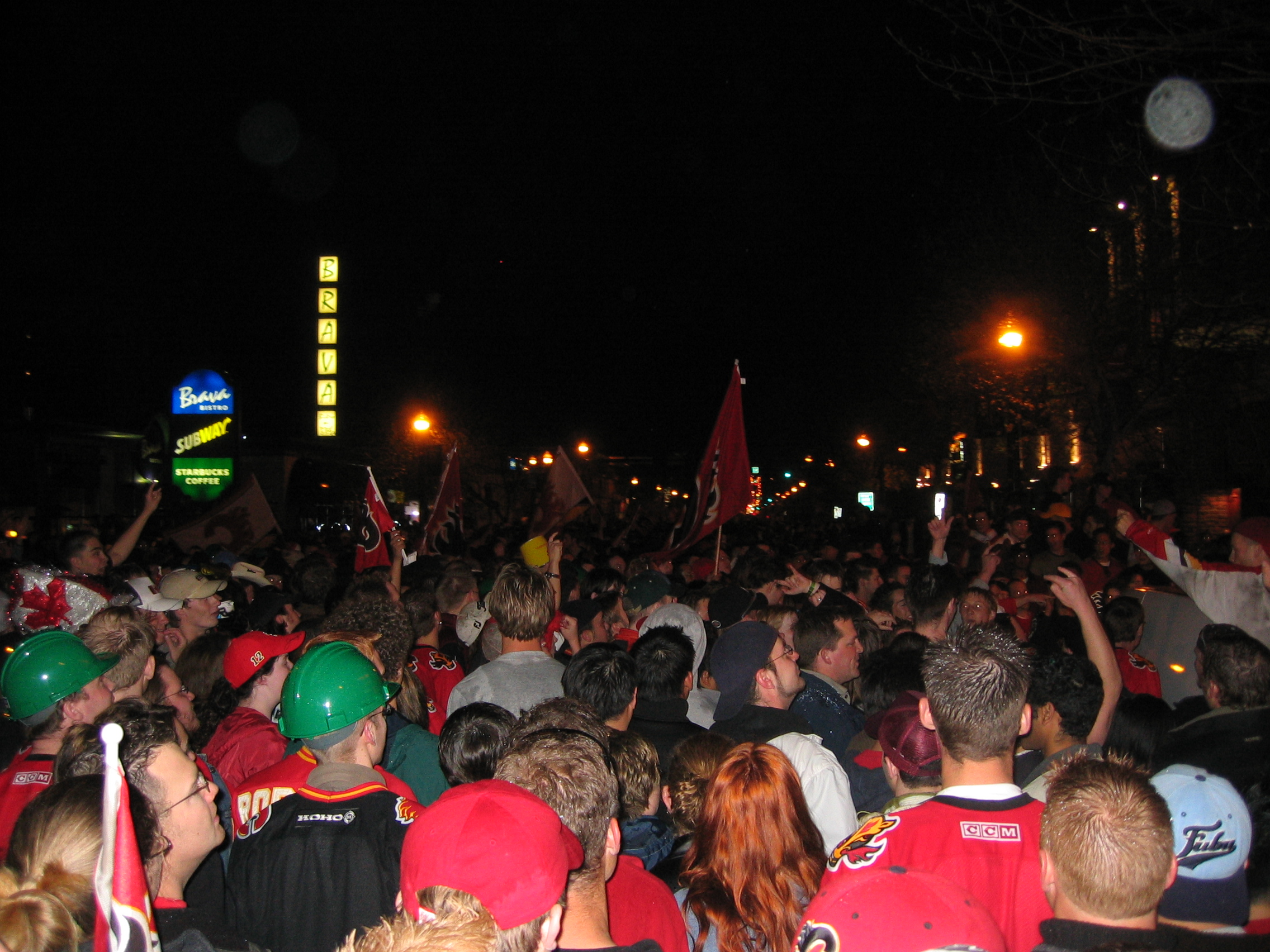
Typical celebration along the Red Mile.

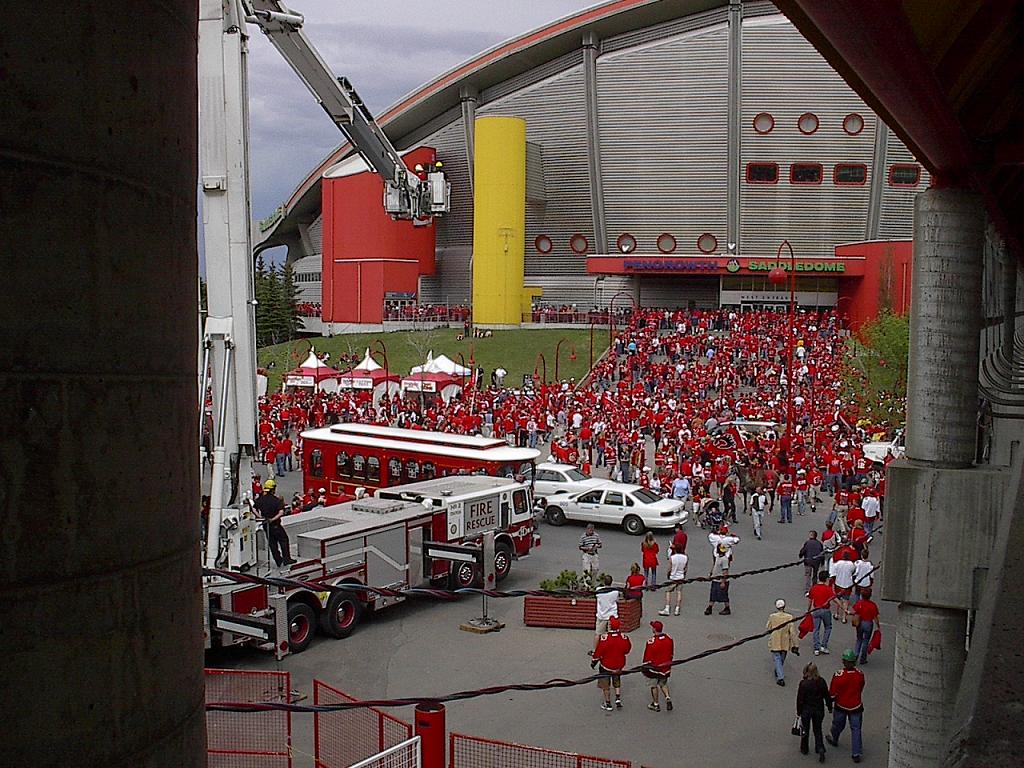
Fans arriving at the Pengrowth Saddledome prior to a Stanley Cup Finals game against Tampa Bay.

Northwest Division
No.	CR		GP	W	L	T	OTL	GF	GA	PTS
1	3	**Vancouver Canucks**	82	43	24	10	5	235	194	101
2	4	**Colorado Avalanche**	82	40	22	13	7	235	198	100
3	6	**Calgary Flames**	82	42	30	7	3	200	176	94
4	9	Edmonton Oilers	82	36	29	12	5	221	208	89
5	10	Minnesota Wild	82	30	29	20	3	188	183	83

Note: CR = Conference rank; GP = Games played; W = Wins; L = Losses; T = Ties; OTL = Overtime loss; GF = Goals for; GA = Goals against; Pts = Points
Bolded teams qualified for the playoffs.

Western Conference
R		Div	GP	W	L	T	OTL	GF	GA	Pts
**1**	**P-** Detroit Red Wings	**CE**	**82**	**48**	**21**	**11**	**2**	**255**	**189**	109
**2**	**Y-** San Jose Sharks	**PA**	**82**	**43**	**21**	**12**	**6**	**255**	**183**	104
**3**	**Y-** Vancouver Canucks	**NW**	**82**	**43**	**24**	**10**	**5**	**235**	**194**	101
**4**	**X-** Colorado Avalanche	**NW**	**82**	**40**	**22**	**13**	**7**	**236**	**198**	100
**5**	**X-** Dallas Stars	**PA**	**82**	**41**	**26**	**13**	**2**	**194**	**175**	97
**6**	**X-** Calgary Flames	**NW**	**82**	**42**	**30**	**7**	**3**	**200**	**176**	94
**7**	**X-** St. Louis Blues	**CE**	**82**	**39**	**30**	**11**	**2**	**191**	**198**	91
**8**	**X-** Nashville Predators	**CE**	**82**	**38**	**29**	**11**	**4**	**216**	**217**	91
8.5
9	Edmonton Oilers	NW	82	36	29	12	5	221	208	89
10	Minnesota Wild	NW	82	30	29	20	3	188	183	83
11	Los Angeles Kings	PA	82	28	29	16	9	205	217	81
12	Mighty Ducks of Anaheim	PA	82	29	35	10	8	184	213	76
13	Phoenix Coyotes	PA	82	22	36	18	6	188	245	68
14	Columbus Blue Jackets	CE	82	25	45	8	4	177	238	62
15	Chicago Blackhawks	CE	82	20	43	11	8	188	259	59

Divisions: CE – Central, PA – Pacific, NW – Northwest

P – Clinched Presidents Trophy; Y – Clinched division; X – Clinched playoff spot

== Playoffs ==
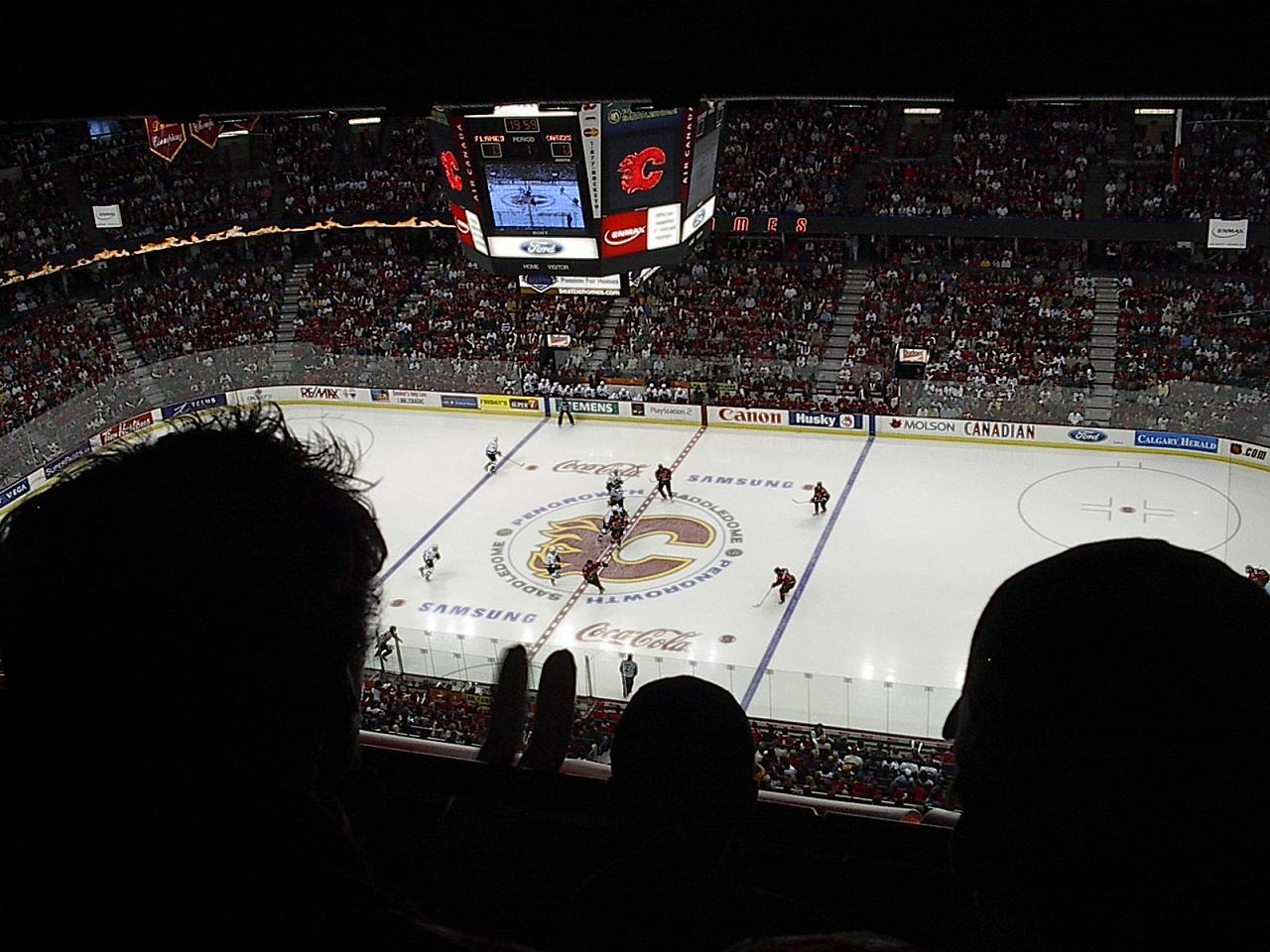
Opening faceoff during game three against Vancouver.

Calgary's defeat of the Vancouver Canucks in the first round was the first playoff series victory for the Flames since they won the Cup in 1989. Jarome Iginla scored two goals and assisted on Martin Gelinas' overtime winner in game seven, sending fans in Calgary into the streets to celebrate the victory. The Flames pulled off an even bigger upset in round two, knocking off the Presidents' Trophy winning Detroit Red Wings in six, including back-to-back 1–0 shutouts in the final two games. Once again, Gelinas scored the overtime winner on a rebound on a play set up by Iginla. In doing so, Gelinas became the first player in NHL history to record three career OT winners to end a series.

The third round series pitted the Flames against head coach Darryl Sutter and goaltender Miikka Kiprusoff's old team – the San Jose Sharks. After jumping out to a 2–0 series lead on the road, the Sharks returned the favour, defeating Calgary twice at home. After blanking the Sharks in San Jose in game five, the Flames returned home with a chance to go to the Stanley Cup Finals. Led once again by Iginla and Gelinas, the Flames cruised to a 3–1 victory. Gelinas once again scored the series-clinching goal, this time in the second period, to return the Flames to the Stanley Cup Finals for the first time since winning it in 1989; this was the first Finals appearance by a Canadian team since the 1994 Vancouver Canucks lost to the New York Rangers. In addition, the Flames became the first team to defeat the 1st, 2nd and 3rd seeded teams in their conference en route to the Stanley Cup Finals (which was only repeated in 2012 by the Los Angeles Kings).

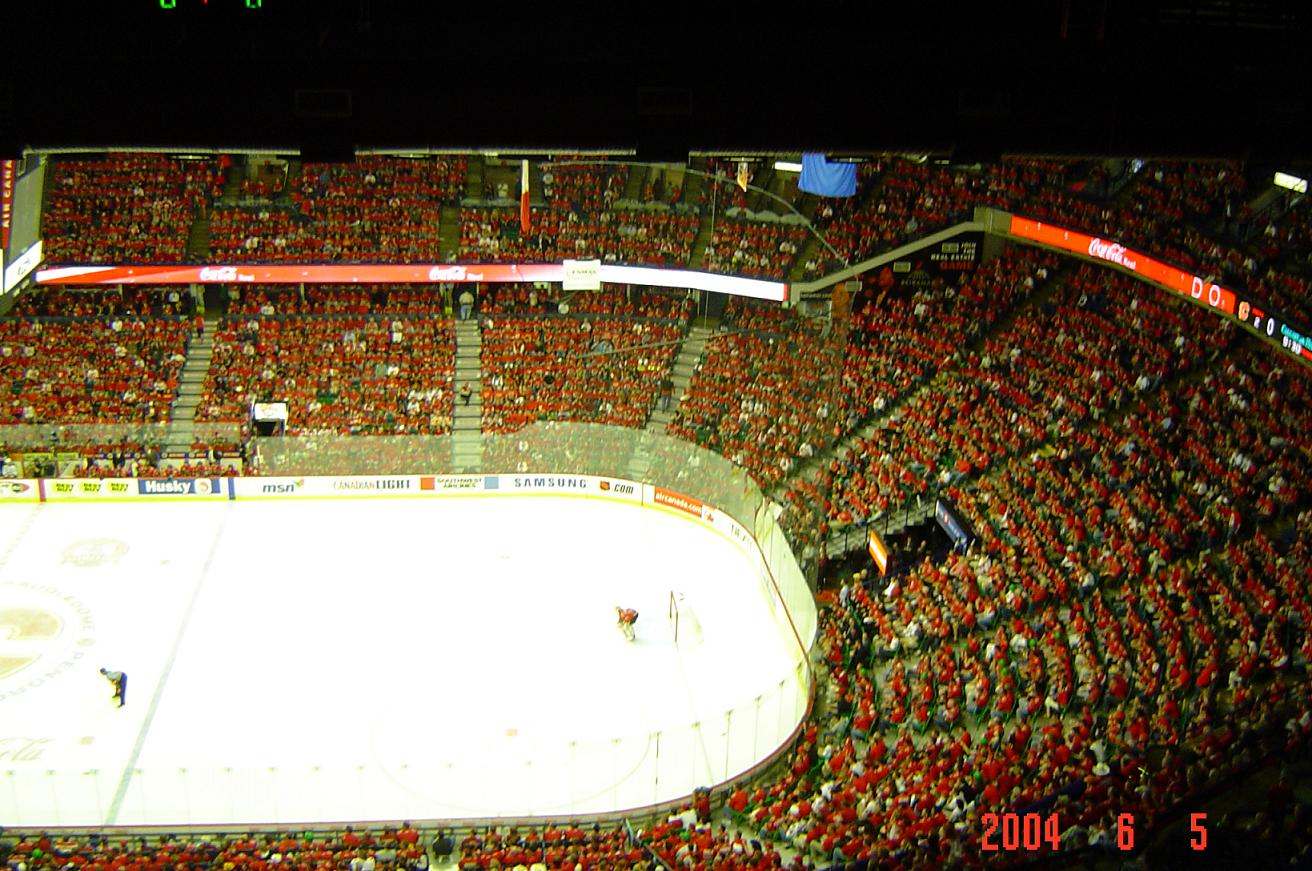
the "C of Red" became a defining characteristic of Flames playoff games.

The Final versus Tampa Bay became known for controversy. First, referee Kerry Fraser was pulled from his game six assignment in Calgary after drawing the ire of Flames fans following several calls in game four that upset the local fans. Fraser would instead officiate game seven in Tampa. The officiating in game four prompted a rant by Sutter, in which he alleged that the NHL did not want Calgary to win.

Late in game six, with the score tied, a shot that deflected off of Gelinas' skate was stopped by Tampa Bay goaltender Nikolai Khabibulin on the goal line. Later replays indicated that the puck may have crossed the line, however the play was not reviewed at the time, and the NHL would later rule the video was inconclusive, since the puck was in the air, not on the ice. Instead, the Lightning would win in double overtime, and go on to win game seven by a 2–1 score.

Despite the game seven loss, the playoff run lifted the city to a new high. Over 30,000 fans celebrated the Flames run at a rally at Olympic Plaza shortly after the Final had ended.

== Schedule and results ==
=== Regular season ===
2003–04 regular season
October: 4–4–0–1 (home: 2–2–0–0; road: 2–2–0–1)

Game	Date	Visitor	Score	Home	OT	Decision	Attendance	Record	Pts	Recap
1	October 9	Calgary	1–4	Vancouver		Turek	18,630	0–1–0–0	0	L
2	October 11	San Jose	2–3	Calgary		McLennan	17,039	1–1–0–0	2	W
3	October 14	Edmonton	0–1	Calgary		McLennan	16,009	2–1–0–0	4	W
4	October 18	Buffalo	2–0	Calgary		Turek	14,139	2–2–0–0	4	L
5	October 21	Calgary	3–2	Minnesota		McLennan	18,064	3–2–0–0	6	W
6	October 24	St. Louis	2–1	Calgary		McLennan	15,454	3–3–0–0	6	L
7	October 25	Calgary	4–2	Edmonton		McLennan	16,839	4–3–0–0	8	W
8	October 28	Calgary	2–4	Colorado		McLennan	18,007	4–4–0–0	8	L
9	October 29	Calgary	3–4	Dallas	OT	Sabourin	18,209	4–4–0–1	9	OTL

November: 5–4–1–2 (home: 4–2–1–1; road: 1–2–0–1)

Game	Date	Visitor	Score	Home	OT	Decision	Attendance	Record	Pts	Recap
10	November 1	Columbus	0–3	Calgary		McLennan	14,539	5–4–0–1	11	W
11	November 4	Detroit	3–0	Calgary		McLennan	15,259	5–5–0–1	11	L
12	November 7	Minnesota	3–0	Calgary		McLennan	13,839	5–6–0–1	11	L
13	November 9	Calgary	3–4	Columbus		Sabourin	17,957	5–7–0–1	11	L
14	November 12	Calgary	6–2	Chicago		McLennan	11,988	6–7–0–1	13	W
15	November 13	Calgary	1–4	Nashville		Sabourin	9,630	6–8–0–1	13	L
16	November 15	Calgary	1–2	Edmonton	OT	McLennan	16,839	6–8–0–2	14	OTL
17	November 18	Toronto	2–3	Calgary	OT	McLennan	17,509	7–8–0–2	16	W
18	November 20	Montreal	1–2	Calgary		Kiprusoff	16,139	8–8–0–2	18	W
19	November 22	Chicago	1–2	Calgary		Kiprusoff	15,549	9–8–0–2	20	W
20	November 27	Colorado	6–5	Calgary	OT	Kiprusoff	??	9–8–0–3	21	OTL
21	November 29	Vancouver	4–4	Calgary	OT	McLennan	18,159	9–8–1–3	22	T

December: 10–3–2–0 (home: 5–2–2–0; road: 5–1–0–0)

Game	Date	Visitor	Score	Home	OT	Decision	Attendance	Record	Pts	Recap
22	December 2	San Jose	1–3	Calgary		Kiprusoff	13,059	10–8–1–3	24	W
23	December 4	Calgary	4–1	Vancouver		Kiprusoff	18,630	11–8–1–3	26	W
24	December 5	Minnesota	1–2	Calgary		Kiprusoff	14,669	12–8–1–3	28	W
25	December 7	Pittsburgh	1–6	Calgary		Kiprusoff	15,009	13–8–1–3	30	W
26	December 9	Calgary	1–2	Minnesota		Kiprusoff	18,568	13–9–1–3	30	L
27	December 11	Carolina	0–1	Calgary		Kiprusoff	14,119	14–9–1–3	32	W
28	December 13	Colorado	1–1	Calgary	OT	Kiprusoff	16,809	14–9–2–3	33	T
29	December 16	Calgary	3–2	Philadelphia	OT	Kiprusoff	18,931	15–9–2–3	35	W
30	December 18	Calgary	5–0	Boston		McLennan	10,659	16–9–2–3	37	W
31	December 19	Calgary	2–1	Columbus		Kiprusoff	16,561	17–9–2–3	39	W
32	December 23	Edmonton	1–2	Calgary		Kiprusoff	18,389	18–9–2–3	41	W
33	December 26	Vancouver	2–0	Calgary		Kiprusoff	18,419	18–10–2–3	41	L
34	December 28	Calgary	2–1	Edmonton		Kiprusoff	16,839	19–10–2–3	43	W
35	December 29	Minnesota	2–2	Calgary	OT	Kiprusoff	16,279	19–10–3–3	44	T
36	December 31	Colorado	2–1	Calgary		McLennan	18,469	19–11–3–3	44	L

January: 6–8–1–0 (home: 2–4–0–0; road: 4–4–1–0)

Game	Date	Visitor	Score	Home	OT	Decision	Attendance	Record	Pts	Recap
37	January 3	Vancouver	3–1	Calgary		McLennan	18,269	19–12–3–3	44	L
38	January 5	Calgary	5–0	NY Rangers		McLennan	18,200	20–12–3–3	46	W
39	January 6	Calgary	3–2	NY Islanders		McLennan	12,576	21–12–3–3	48	W
40	January 8	Calgary	1–3	Chicago		McLennan	10,865	21–13–3–3	48	L
41	January 10	Florida	2–4	Calgary		McLennan	16,809	22–13–3–3	50	W
42	January 13	Calgary	1–4	Toronto		McLennan	19,310	22–14–3–2	50	L
43	January 14	Calgary	3–3	Washington	OT	McLennan	14,537	22–14–4–3	51	T
44	January 17	Dallas	3–2	Calgary		Turek	17,909	22–15–4–3	51	L
45	January 19	Calgary	5–1	Anaheim		Turek	13,146	23–15–4–3	53	W
46	January 20	Calgary	1–4	Los Angeles		Turek	18,118	23–16–4–3	53	L
47	January 22	Nashville	0–4	Calgary		Turek	16,629	24–16–4–3	55	W
48	January 24	Tampa Bay	6–2	Calgary		Turek	17,109	24–17–4–3	55	L
49	January 27	Calgary	2–1	Phoenix		Turek	??	25–17–4–3	57	W
50	January 28	Calgary	1–4	San Jose		Turek	15,119	25–18–4–3	57	L
51	January 30	Chicago	5–3	Calgary		Turek	17,139	25–19–4–3	57	L

February: 7–5–1–0 (home: 4–2–1–0; road: 3–3–0–0)

Game	Date	Visitor	Score	Home	OT	Decision	Attendance	Record	Pts	Recap
52	February 1	Anaheim	4–6	Calgary		McLennan	15,189	26–19–4–3	59	W
53	February 3	Los Angeles	4–4	Calgary	OT	McLennan	14,169	26–19–5–3	60	T
54	February 5	St. Louis	2–1	Calgary		Turek	15,389	26–20–5–3	60	L
55	February 10	Atlanta	2–5	Calgary		Kiprusoff	16,549	27–20–5–3	62	W
56	February 11	Calgary	3–2	Vancouver		Turek	18,630	28–20–5–3	64	W
57	February 13	Anaheim	1–2	Calgary		Kiprusoff	17,749	29–20–5–3	66	W
58	February 15	Calgary	2–1	Minnesota		Kiprusoff	18,568	30–20–5–3	68	W
59	February 19	Calgary	1–4	Montreal		Kiprusoff	21,273	30–21–5–3	68	L
60	February 21	Calgary	1–2	Ottawa		Turek	18,500	30–22–5–3	68	L
61	February 22	Calgary	1–3	New Jersey		Kiprusoff	17,733	30–23–5–3	68	L
62	February 24	Calgary	2–0	Colorado		Kiprusoff	18,007	31–23–5–3	70	W
63	February 26	Detroit	2–1	Calgary		Kiprusoff	18,862	31–24–5–3	70	L
64	February 29	Phoenix	2–4	Calgary		Kiprusoff	17,579	32–24–5–3	72	W

March: 9–5–2–0 (home: 4–2–1–0; road: 5–3–1–0)

Game	Date	Visitor	Score	Home	OT	Decision	Attendance	Record	Pts	Recap
65	March 2	Calgary	4–2	St. Louis		Kiprusoff	15,571	33–24–5–3	74	W
66	March 3	Calgary	1–2	Detroit		Turek	20,066	33–25–5–3	74	L
67	March 5	Calgary	1–5	Dallas		Kiprusoff	18,532	33–26–5–3	74	L
68	March 7	Calgary	7–1	Colorado		Kiprusoff	18,007	34–26–5–3	76	W
69	March 9	Edmonton	1–1	Calgary	OT	Kiprusoff	18,479	34–26–6–3	77	T
70	March 11	Ottawa	2–4	Calgary		Kiprusoff	17,869	35–26–6–3	79	W
71	March 13	Calgary	4–4	Nashville	OT	Kiprusoff	17,113	35–26–7–3	80	T
72	March 14	Calgary	3–0	St. Louis		Turek	19,523	36–26–7–3	82	W
73	March 16	Calgary	4–1	Detroit		Kiprusoff	20,066	37–26–7–3	84	W
74	March 18	Columbus	0–2	Calgary		Kiprusoff	17,479	38–26–7–3	86	W
75	March 20	Nashville	3–1	Calgary		Kiprusoff	18,439	38–27–7–3	86	L
76	March 22	Dallas	4–0	Calgary		Kiprusoff	17,729	38–28–7–3	86	L
77	March 24	Calgary	4–0	Phoenix		Turek	18,496	39–28–7–3	88	W
78	March 25	Calgary	2–3	San Jose		Kiprusoff	15,588	39–29–7–3	88	L
79	March 27	Los Angeles	2–3	Calgary	OT	Kiprusoff	18,419	40–29–7–3	90	W
80	March 31	Phoenix	0–1	Calgary		Kiprusoff	18,419	41–29–7–3	92	W

April: 1–1–0–0 (home: 0–0–0–0; road: 1–1–0–0)

Game	Date	Visitor	Score	Home	OT	Decision	Attendance	Record	Pts	Recap
81	April 2	Calgary	3–2	Los Angeles		Kiprusoff	18,247	42–29–7–3	94	W
82	April 4	Calgary	1–2	Anaheim		Turek	17,174	42–30–7–3	94	L

Legend: W Win (2 points) L Loss (0 points) T Tie (1 point) OTL Overtime loss (1 point)

=== Playoffs ===
2004 Stanley Cup playoffs
Western Conference Quarterfinals vs. Vancouver (3) – Flames win 4–3

Game	Date	Visitor	Score	Home	OT	Decision	Attendance	Series	Recap
1	April 7	Calgary	3–5	Vancouver		Kiprusoff	18,630	Vancouver leads 1–0	L
2	April 9	Calgary	2–1	Vancouver		Kiprusoff	18,630	Series tied 1–1	W
3	April 11	Vancouver	2–1	Calgary		Kiprusoff	19,289	Vancouver leads 2–1	L
4	April 13	Vancouver	0–4	Calgary		Kiprusoff	19,289	Series tied 2–2	W
5	April 15	Calgary	2–1	Vancouver		Kiprusoff	18,630	Calgary leads 3–2	W
6	April 17	Vancouver	5–4	Calgary	3OT	Kiprusoff	19,289	Series tied 3–3	L
7	April 19	Calgary	3–2	Vancouver	OT	Kiprusoff	18,630	Calgary wins 4–3	W

Western Conference Semifinals vs. Detroit (1) – Flames win 4–2

Game	Date	Visitor	Score	Home	OT	Decision	Attendance	Series	Recap
1	April 22	Calgary	2–1	Detroit	OT	Kiprusoff	20,066	Calgary leads 1–0	W
2	April 24	Calgary	2–5	Detroit		Kiprusoff	20,066	Series tied 1–1	L
3	April 27	Detroit	2–3	Calgary		Kiprusoff	19,289	Calgary leads 2–1	W
4	April 29	Detroit	4–2	Calgary		Kiprusoff	19,289	Series tied 2–2	L
5	May 1	Calgary	1–0	Detroit		Kiprusoff	20,066	Calgary leads 3–2	W
6	May 3	Detroit	0–1	Calgary	OT	Kiprusoff	19,289	Calgary wins 4–2	W

Western Conference Finals vs. San Jose (2) – Flames win 4–2

Game	Date	Visitor	Score	Home	OT	Decision	Attendance	Series	Recap
1	May 9	Calgary	4–3	San Jose	OT	Kiprusoff	17,496	Calgary leads 1–0	W
2	May 11	Calgary	4–1	San Jose		Kiprusoff	17,496	Calgary leads 2–0	W
3	May 13	San Jose	3–0	Calgary		Kiprusoff	19,289	Calgary leads 2–1	L
4	May 16	San Jose	4–2	Calgary		Kiprusoff	19,289	Series tied 2–2	L
5	May 17	Calgary	3–0	San Jose		Kiprusoff	17,496	Calgary leads 3–2	W
6	May 19	San Jose	1–3	Calgary		Kiprusoff	19,289	Calgary wins 4–2	W

Stanley Cup Finals vs. Tampa Bay (1E) – Lightning win 4–3

Game	Date	Visitor	Score	Home	OT	Decision	Attendance	Series	Recap
1	May 25	Calgary	4–1	Tampa Bay		Kiprusoff	21,674	Calgary leads 1–0	W
2	May 27	Calgary	1–4	Tampa Bay		Kiprusoff	22,222	Series tied 1–1	L
3	May 29	Tampa Bay	0–3	Calgary		Kiprusoff	19,221	Calgary leads 2–1	W
4	May 31	Tampa Bay	1–0	Calgary		Kiprusoff	19,221	Series tied 2–2	L
5	June 3	Calgary	3–2	Tampa Bay	OT	Kiprusoff	22,426	Calgary leads 3–2	W
6	June 5	Tampa Bay	3–2	Calgary	2OT	Kiprusoff	19,221	Series tied 3–3	L
7	June 7	Calgary	1–2	Tampa Bay		Kiprusoff	22,717	Tampa Bay wins 4–3	L

Legend: W Win L Loss

== Player statistics ==
Jarome Iginla's 41 goals placed him in a tie for the league lead, earning him his second Rocket Richard Trophy. Iginla shared the award with Atlanta's Ilya Kovalchuk and Columbus' Rick Nash, both of whom also scored 41 goals. Iginla also led the league in playoff goals, as his total of 13 was one better than Tampa's Brad Richards and Ruslan Fedotenko. Iginla led the team in scoring for the fourth consecutive season,

Miikka Kiprusoff, acquired from the San Jose Sharks early in the season, set a modern NHL record low goals against average of 1.69 in 39 games played. He recorded five shutouts in the playoffs, a franchise record. Kiprusoff's performance with the Flames led to his being named the starting goaltender for team Finland at the 2004 World Cup of Hockey, where he led the Finns to the championship final.

=== Scoring ===
- Position abbreviations: C = Centre; D = Defence; G = Goaltender; LW = Left wing; RW = Right wing
- † = Joined team via a transaction (e.g., trade, waivers, signing) during the season. Stats reflect time with the Flames only.
- ‡ = Left team via a transaction (e.g., trade, waivers, release) during the season. Stats reflect time with the Flames only.
- **Bold** text denotes league leader.

No.	Player	Pos	Regular season						Playoffs					
No.	Player	Pos	GP	G	A	Pts	+/-	PIM	GP	G	A	Pts	+/-	PIM
12	Jarome Iginla	RW	81	**41**	32	73	21	84	26	**13**	9	22	13	45
22	Craig Conroy	C	63	8	39	47	13	44	26	6	11	17	12	12
16	Shean Donovan	RW	82	18	24	42	14	72	24	5	5	10	0	23
23	Martin Gelinas	LW	76	17	18	35	10	70	26	8	7	15	10	35
4	Jordan Leopold	D	82	9	24	33	8	24	26	0	10	10	5	6
37	Dean McAmmond	LW	64	17	13	30	9	18	—	—	—	—	—	—
18 (Note: Lombardi wore number 49 throughout October.)	Matthew Lombardi	C	79	16	13	29	4	32	13	1	5	6	1	4
19	Oleg Saprykin	LW	69	12	17	29	1	41	26	3	3	6	1	14
27	Steve Reinprecht	C	44	7	22	29	1	4	—	—	—	—	—	—
17	Chris Clark	RW	82	10	15	25	−3	106	26	3	3	6	0	30
32	Toni Lydman	D	67	4	16	20	6	30	6	0	1	1	1	2
28	Robyn Regehr	D	82	4	14	18	14	74	26	2	7	9	7	20
7	Chuck Kobasew	RW	70	6	11	17	−12	51	26	0	1	1	0	24
11	Stephane Yelle	C	53	4	13	17	1	24	23	3	3	6	−1	16
44	Rhett Warrener	D	77	3	14	17	8	97	24	0	1	1	1	6
21	Andrew Ference	D	72	4	12	16	5	53	26	0	3	3	5	25
3	Denis Gauthier	D	80	1	15	16	4	113	6	0	1	1	2	4
24	Ville Nieminen†	RW	19	3	5	8	6	18	24	4	4	8	0	55
33	Krzysztof Oliwa	LW	65	3	2	5	−8	247	20	2	0	2	−1	6
15	Chris Simon†	LW	13	3	2	5	1	25	16	5	2	7	0	**74**
26	Josh Green‡	LW	36	2	4	6	−3	24	—	—	—	—	—	—
26	Marcus Nilson†	LW	14	0	5	5	3	14	26	4	7	11	0	12
15	Blair Betts‡	C	20	1	2	3	−1	10	—	—	—	—	—	—
5	Steve Montador	D	26	1	2	3	−1	50	20	1	2	3	4	6
10	Dave Lowry	LW	18	1	1	2	−6	11	10	0	0	0	−1	6
20	Lynn Loyns†	LW	12	0	2	2	−2	2	—	—	—	—	—	—
46	Jason Morgan‡	LW	13	0	2	2	1	2	—	—	—	—	—	—
34	Miikka Kiprusoff†	G	38	0	1	1		15	26	0	1	1		0
29	Jamie McLennan‡	G	26	0	1	1		4	—	—	—	—	—	—
50	Dany Sabourin	G	4	0	1	1		0	—	—	—	—	—	—
1	Roman Turek	G	18	0	1	1		0	1	0	0	0		0
2	Mike Commodore	D	12	0	0	0	−4	25	20	0	2	2	1	19
25	Martin Sonnenberg	LW	5	0	0	0	−2	2	—	—	—	—	—	—
43	Brennan Evans	D	—	—	—	—	—	—	2	0	0	0	0	0

=== Goaltending ===
- † = Joined team via a transaction (e.g., trade, waivers, signing) during the season. Stats reflect time with the Flames only.
- ‡ = Left team via a transaction (e.g., trade, waivers, release) during the season. Stats reflect time with the Flames only.
- **Bold** text denotes league record. Italics denotes franchise record.

No.	Player	Regular season										Playoffs								
No.	Player	GP	W	L	T	SA	GA	GAA	SV%	SO	TOI	GP	W	L	SA	GA	GAA	SV%	SO	TOI
34	Miikka Kiprusoff†	38	24	10	4	966	65	**1.69**	.933	4	1655	26	15	11	710	51	1.85	.928	5	2301
29	Jamie McLennan‡	26	12	9	3	587	53	2.20	.910	4	1446	—	—	—	—	—	—	—	—	—
1	Roman Turek	18	6	11	0	463	40	2.33	.914	3	1031	1	0	0	3	0	0.00	1.000	0	19
50	Dany Sabourin	4	0	3	0	66	10	3.55	.848	0	169	—	—	—	—	—	—	—	—	—

== Awards and records ==
=== Awards ===
Type	Award/honor	Recipient	Ref
League (annual)	King Clancy Memorial Trophy	Jarome Iginla	
League (annual)	Maurice "Rocket" Richard Trophy	Jarome Iginla (Note: Shared with Ilya Kovalchuk of the Atlanta Thrashers and Rick Nash of the Columbus Blue Jackets.)	
League (annual)	NHL second All-Star team	Jarome Iginla (Right wing)	
League (in-season)	NHL All-Star Game selection	Jarome Iginla	
League (in-season)	NHL Defensive Player of the Month	Miikka Kiprusoff (December)	
League (in-season)	NHL Defensive Player of the Week	Miikka Kiprusoff (December 8)	
League (in-season)	NHL Defensive Player of the Week	Miikka Kiprusoff (February 16)	
League (in-season)	NHL Offensive Player of the Week	Shean Donovan (December 8)	
League (in-season)	NHL Offensive Player of the Week	Jarome Iginla (January 12)	
League (in-season)	NHL YoungStars Game selection	Matthew Lombardi	
Team	Molson Cup	Jarome Iginla	
Team	Ralph T. Scurfield Humanitarian Award	Martin Gelinas	

=== Milestones ===
Milestone	Player	Date	Ref
First game	Matthew Lombardi	October 9, 2003	
First game	Dany Sabourin	October 29, 2003	
First game	Brennan Evans	April 27, 2004	
1,000th game played	Martin Gelinas	December 9, 2003	
25th shutout	Roman Turek	January 22, 2004	
750th game coached	Darryl Sutter	February 5, 2004	

== Transactions ==
Prior to the season, the Flames sent restricted free agent Chris Drury to the Buffalo Sabres for defenceman Rhett Warrener and forward Steve Reinprecht, whom the Sabres had acquired from the Colorado Avalanche, then included in the Drury trade. Warrener especially was seen as being a key player for the Flames as they attempted to qualify for the playoffs.

The acquisition of Miikka Kiprusoff proved to be a significant turning point for the Flames' season. Darryl Sutter dealt for Kiprusoff after starting goaltender Roman Turek suffered a knee injury that left him unable to play for several months. Kiprusoff stabilized the Flames' goaltending situation, producing a league record low goals against average.

=== Trades ===
Date	Details		Ref
June 21, 2003	To Calgary Flames: 3rd-round pick in 2003; 5th-round pick in 2003; 6th-round pick in 2003	To San Jose Sharks: 2nd-round pick in 2003	
July 3, 2003	To Calgary Flames: Steve Reinprecht; Rhett Warrener	To Buffalo Sabres: Steve Begin; Chris Drury	
July 16, 2003	To Calgary Flames: 4th-round pick in 2004; Future considerations	To Carolina Hurricanes: Bob Boughner	
November 16, 2003	To Calgary Flames: Miikka Kiprusoff	To San Jose Sharks: 2nd round pick in 2005	
January 9, 2004	To Calgary Flames: Lynn Loyns	To San Jose Sharks: Future considerations	
February 24, 2004	To Calgary Flames: Ville Nieminen	To Chicago Blackhawks: Jason Morgan; Conditional draft pick in 2005	
March 6, 2004	To Calgary Flames: Chris Simon; 7th-round pick in 2004	To New York Rangers: Blair Betts; Jamie McLennan; Rights to Greg Moore	
March 8, 2004	To Calgary Flames: Marcus Nilson	To Florida Panthers: 2nd-round pick in 2004	

=== Players acquired ===
Date	Player	Former team	Term	Via	Ref
July 15, 2003	Matt Davidson	Columbus Blue Jackets	1-year	Free agency	
July 17, 2003	Josh Green	Washington Capitals		Free agency	
July 30, 2003	Krzysztof Oliwa	Boston Bruins	1-year	Free agency	
July 31, 2003	Jesse Wallin	Detroit Red Wings	1-year	Free agency	
September 30, 2003	Brennan Evans	Kootenay Ice (WHL)		Free agency	
February 19, 2004	Jason Morgan	Nashville Predators		Waivers	

=== Players lost ===
Date	Player	New team	Via (Note: In parentheses is the player's free agency group on July 1 if applicable.)	Ref
June 10, 2003	Ladislav Kohn	Espoo Blues (Liiga)	Free agency (UFA)	
June 17, 2003	Mike Martin	Amur Khabarovsk (RSL)	Free agency (VI)	
July 1, 2003	Dave Huntzicker (Note: Huntzicker retired.)		Contract expiration (UFA)	
July 1, 2003	Scott Nichol	Chicago Blackhawks	Free agency (UFA)	
July 4, 2003	Jean-Francois Damphousse	Montreal Canadiens	Free agency (UFA)	
July 25, 2003	Mike Mottau	Anaheim Mighty Ducks	Free agency (VI)	
August 22, 2003	Rick Mrozik	Buffalo Sabres	Free agency (VI)	
September 5, 2003	Darcy Verot	Washington Capitals	Free agency (VI)	
September 10, 2003	Levente Szuper	Worcester IceCats (AHL)	Free agency (UFA)	
October 15, 2003	Shaun Sutter	Florence Pride (ECHL)	Free agency (UFA)	
October 20, 2003	Ryan Christie	Las Vegas Wranglers (ECHL)	Free agency (UFA)	
October 21, 2003	Jan Vodrazka	Houston Aeros (AHL)	Free agency (UFA)	
November 18, 2003	Craig Berube	Philadelphia Phantoms (AHL)	Free agency (III)	
November 18, 2003	Blake Sloan	Grand Rapids Griffins (AHL)	Free agency (UFA)	
December 31, 2003	Jason Morgan	Nashville Predators	Waivers	
March 6, 2004	Josh Green	New York Rangers	Waivers	
March 28, 2004	Matt Davidson	DEG Metro Stars (DEL)	Free agency	

=== Signings ===
Date	Player	Term	Contract type	Ref
June 10, 2003	Blair Betts		Re-signing	
June 10, 2003	Andrew Ference	2-year	Re-signing	
June 25, 2003	Steve Montador	3-year	Re-signing	
June 25, 2003	Dany Sabourin	1-year	Re-signing	
June 25, 2003	Oleg Saprykin	3-year	Re-signing	
July 15, 2003	Stephane Yelle	3-year	Re-signing	
July 16, 2003	Steven Reinprecht	2-year	Re-signing	
July 16, 2003	Rail Rozakov		Entry-level	
August 11, 2003	Toni Lydman	3-year	Re-signing	
September 9, 2003	Mike Commodore	1-year	Re-signing	
September 11, 2003	Dave Lowry	1-year	Re-signing	
September 12, 2003	Rhett Warrener	2-year	Re-signing	

== Draft picks ==
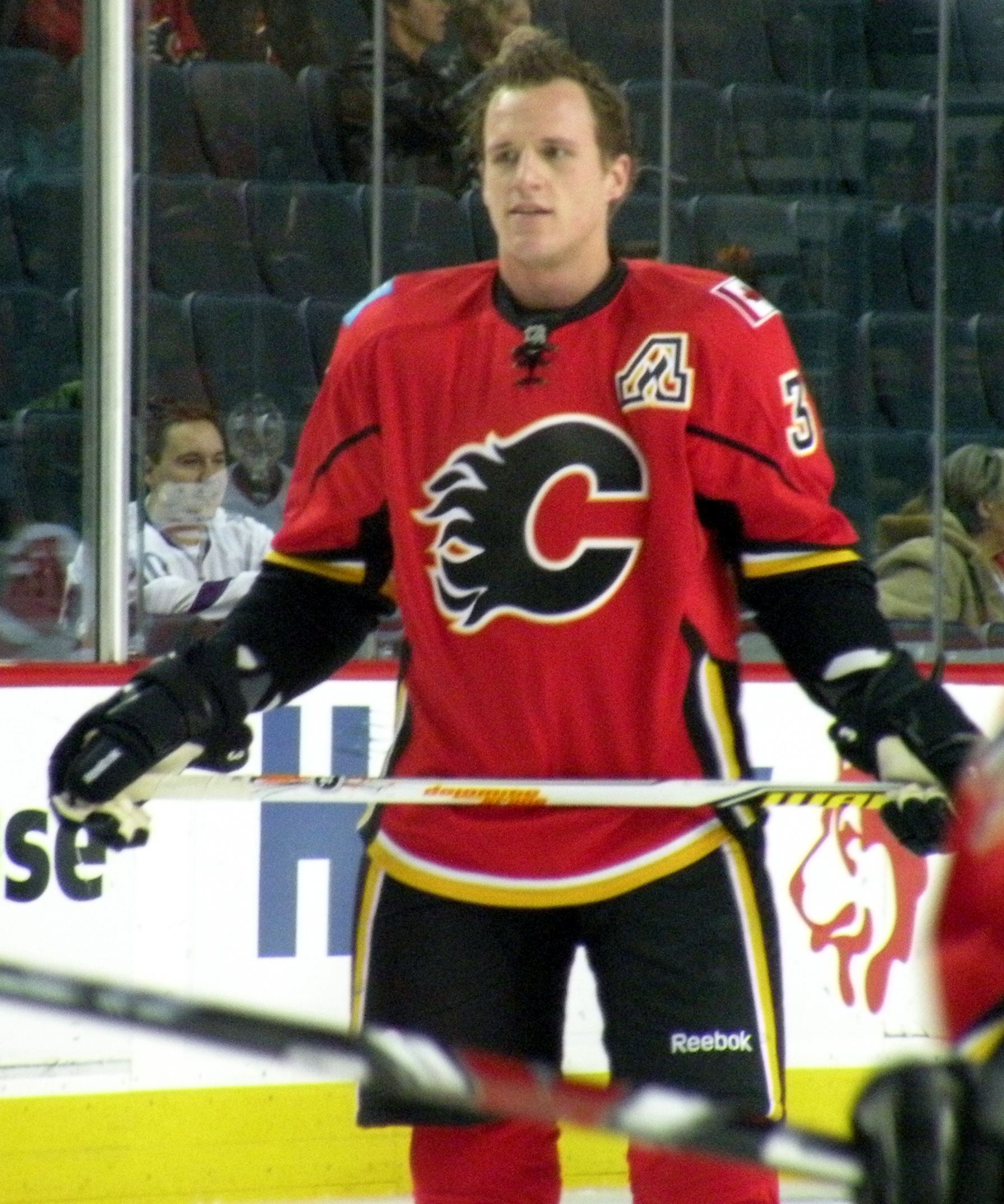
Dion Phaneuf was the Flames' first round selection, ninth overall.

The 2003 NHL entry draft was held in Nashville, Tennessee on June 21–22, 2003. The Flames selected nine players in the draft. Calgary selected offensive minded defenceman Dion Phaneuf with their first pick, ninth overall. Phaneuf's coach with the Red Deer Rebels described him as being a physical player on draft day. "This kid doesn't hit to hit. He hits to hurt. It's a mind-set that's rare in the game. At any level. You can't teach it, you can't fake it. You're either born with it, or you're not." Phaneuf quickly made an impact in the NHL, scoring 20 goals as a rookie in 2005–06, earning a nomination for the Calder Memorial Trophy as top rookie. Phaneuf was nominated for the Norris Trophy as top defenceman in 2007–08, just his third year in the NHL.

Rnd	Pick	Player	Nationality	Position	Team (league)	NHL statistics				
Rnd	Pick	Player	Nationality	Position	Team (league)	GP	G	A	Pts	PIM
1	9	Dion Phaneuf	Canada	D	Red Deer Rebels (WHL)	1048	137	357	494	1345
2	39	Tim Ramholt	Switzerland	D	Cape Breton Screaming Eagles (QMJHL)	1	0	0	0	0
3	97	Ryan Donally	Canada	LW	Windsor Spitfires (OHL)					
4	112	Jamie Tardif	Canada	RW	Peterborough Petes (OHL)	2	0	0	0	0
5	143	Greg Moore	United States	RW	University of Maine (Hockey East)	10	0	0	0	0
6	173	Tyler Johnson	Canada	C	Moose Jaw Warriors (WHL)					
7	206	Thomas Bellemare	Canada	D	Drummondville Voltigeurs (QMJHL)					
8	240	Cam Cunning	Canada	LW	Kamloops Blazers (WHL)					
9	270	Kevin Harvey	Canada	LW	Georgetown Raiders (OPJHL)					

== Farm teams ==
=== Lowell Lockmonsters ===
After shutting down the Saint John Flames, the Flames entered into an agreement to share an affiliation with the Lowell Lockmonsters with the Carolina Hurricanes. The Lockmonsters posted a 32–36–6–6 record, out of the playoffs with a 6th-place finish in the Atlantic Division.

=== Las Vegas Wranglers ===
The Las Vegas Wranglers entered the ECHL as an expansion team, immediately entering an affiliation agreement with the Flames. The team was immediately competitive, finishing second in the Pacific Division with a 43–22–7 record. This did not translate into the playoffs however, as the Wranglers lost in the divisional semifinals.

== See also ==
- 2003–04 NHL season
