= Shea Weber =

Canadian ice hockey player (born 1985)

- Hockey Hall of Fame, 2024
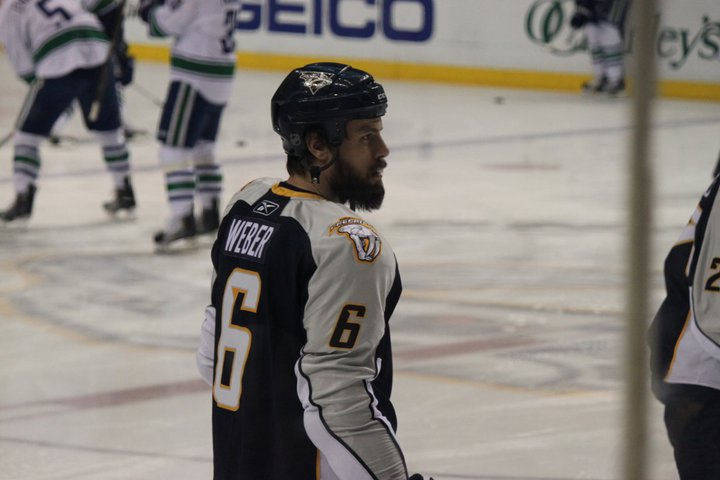
- Weber with the Nashville Predators in May 2011
- Born: August 14, 1985 (age 41) Sicamous, British Columbia, Canada
- Height: 6 ft 4 in (193 cm)
- Weight: 230 lb (104 kg; 16 st 6 lb)
- Position: Defence
- Shot: Right
- Played for: Nashville Predators; Montreal Canadiens
- National team: Canada
- NHL draft: 49th overall, 2003; Nashville Predators
- Playing career: 2005–2021

Shea Weber (born August 14, 1985) is a Canadian former professional ice hockey player who was a defenceman for 16 seasons in the National Hockey League (NHL). Originally selected in the second round, 49th overall, by the Nashville Predators in the 2003 NHL entry draft, he spent eleven seasons in Nashville (including six seasons as captain) until being traded to the Montreal Canadiens in June 2016. Weber is predominantly known for his powerful slapshot, winning the hardest shot event four times at the annual NHL All-Star Skills Competition. Weber was inducted into the Hockey Hall of Fame in 2024.

Weber has represented Canada at a number of International Ice Hockey Federation (IIHF)-sanctioned events, winning a World Junior Ice Hockey Championship gold medal in 2005, an Ice Hockey World Championships gold medal in 2007, and two Olympic gold medals at the 2010 and 2014 Winter Olympics.

== Early life ==
Weber was born on August 14, 1985, in Sicamous, British Columbia. His mother, Tracy, was a hairdresser, and his father, James Weber, a sawmill worker. Weber first played organized ice hockey at age six. Growing up, he played in the Sicamous and District Minor Hockey Association, a division of the British Columbia Amateur Hockey Association (BCAHA), often switching between forward and defenceman positions. In Weber's second year of bantam, he permanently switched to defence. He credits his father for convincing him to make the switch because he thought Weber would "have a better shot at a pro career as a defenceman". Between the ages of fourteen and fifteen, Weber grew 5 inches, from 5-foot-9 (1.75 metres) to 6-foot-2 (1.88 metres).

== Playing career ==
=== Junior career ===
Weber went unselected in his Western Hockey League (WHL) Bantam Draft year, but was placed by the Kelowna Rockets on their protected-players list during his second season of bantam. At the end of the season, he moved up to junior "B" ice hockey with his hometown Sicamous Eagles of the Kootenay International Junior Hockey League (KIJHL). Weber's 42 points in 47 games played helped his team to a near-perfect season of 43–5–1–1, winning both the British Columbian Cyclone Taylor Cup KIJHL league championship and the Western Canadian Keystone Cup. In the Keystone Cup championship game, Weber scored the Eagles' first goal of the game in a 2–1 victory over the Spruce Grove Regals. In addition to his championship run with the Eagles, Weber played in five games for the Kelowna Rockets during their 2001–02 WHL season.

The following season Weber began his rookie season with the Rockets. Early into the campaign, Weber established a physical presence, often fighting opposing players. Overall, he had 167 penalty minutes that season, the most in his entire playing career. Offensively, Weber finished his rookie season with eighteen points in seventy games played. He also scored 5 points in 19 playoff games as the Rockets won the franchise's first Ed Chynoweth Cup as WHL champions, defeating the Red Deer Rebels in the finals. As WHL champions, the Rockets represented the WHL at the 2003 Memorial Cup in Quebec City, Quebec, where they were defeated by the Hull Olympiques 2–1 in the semi-final. At the completion of his rookie WHL season, Weber was eligible to be drafted into the National Hockey League (NHL) at the 2003 NHL entry draft. Heading into the draft, he was ranked 42nd among North American skaters by the NHL Central Scouting Bureau and 54th overall by International Scouting Services. On June 21, 2003, he was drafted in the second round, 49th overall, by the Nashville Predators.

In his second season with the Rockets, Weber was named to the WHL roster for the 2004 ADT Canada-Russia Challenge in Red Deer and Lethbridge, Alberta. In the two games played, he recorded one assist. At the completion of the regular season, Weber had improved his offensive statistics from the previous season, recording 32 points in 60 games. Weber was named the WHL player of the week for April 6–12, 2004, after recording one goal and six assists in four Kelowna wins over the Tri-City Americans as the Rockets eliminated the Americans four games to two in the Western Conference semi-finals. He finished the WHL playoffs with 17 points in 17 games as the Rockets were eliminated four games to three by the Everett Silvertips in the Western Conference finals. Despite being eliminated from the WHL playoffs, the Rockets advanced to their second consecutive Memorial Cup as the host team. At the 2004 Memorial Cup, Weber was named to the tournament all-star team after recording four points in four games played as the Rockets defeated the Gatineau Olympiques 2–1 in the championship game to win their first Memorial Cup. At the completion of the season, Weber was named to the WHL Western Conference's second all-star team.

Weber's final season with the Rockets proved to be his best with the team, despite a late season injury. On March 5, 2005, he injured his left knee after colliding with Vancouver Giants left winger Cam Cunning. The injury resulted in Weber missing the remainder of the regular season and the Rockets' Western Conference quarter-finals series against the Vancouver Giants. Despite the injury, Weber finished the regular season with WHL career bests for goals (12), assists (29) and points (41) in 55 games played. After returning from injury, Weber scored 9 goals and 17 points in 18 playoff games as the Rockets won the Ed Chynoweth Cup en route to their third consecutive Memorial Cup. For his efforts, he was awarded the airBC Trophy as the most valuable player of the WHL playoffs. At the 2005 Memorial Cup, with what was considered as one of the best tournament fields in Memorial Cup history, the Rockets were eliminated after losing all three of their round robin games. At the completion of the season, Weber was named to the WHL Western Conference first all-star team and was the Western Conference nominee for the Bill Hunter Memorial Trophy as the top defenceman in the WHL, although Dion Phaneuf ultimately won the award. Weber was also named to the Canadian Major Junior second all-star team.

=== Nashville Predators (2005–2016) ===
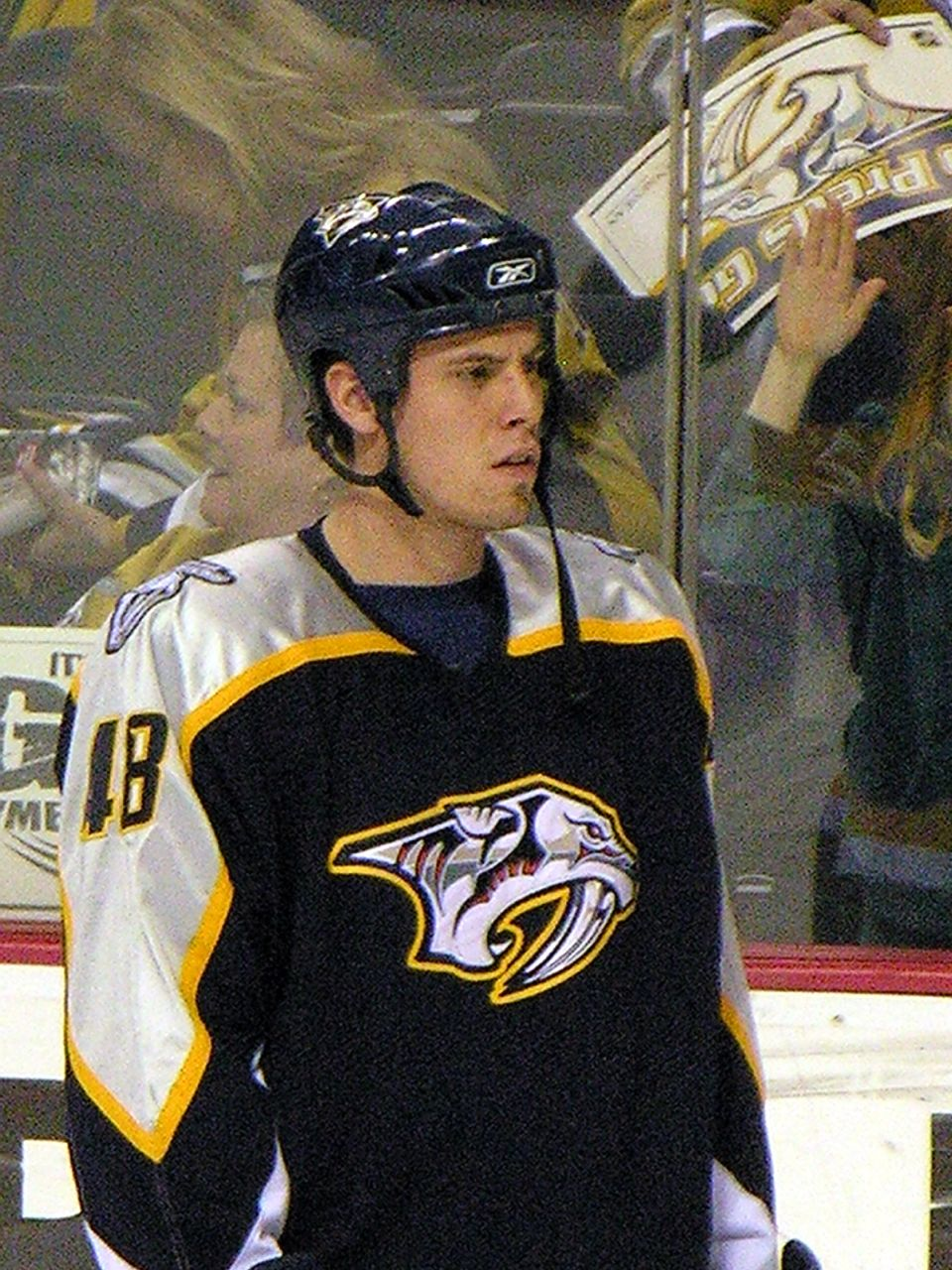
Weber with the Predators during the 2005–06 season, his rookie season

On September 10, 2004, Weber signed a three-year, $1.425 million entry-level contract with the Nashville Predators. A year-and-a-half later, Weber made his NHL debut on January 6, 2006, against the Detroit Red Wings, recording three shots on goal in 11:08 minutes of icetime. Three months later, on April 6, 2006, he scored his first NHL goal, against Reinhard Divis of the St. Louis Blues in a 3–0 Nashville victory. Weber went on to play in 28 games during his rookie season, finishing with two goals and ten assists. He also scored two goals in four Stanley Cup playoff games with the Predators before the team was eliminated in the first round by the San Jose Sharks. With Nashville's American Hockey League (AHL) affiliate, the Milwaukee Admirals, still in playoff action, Weber was reassigned to the Admirals' roster for the remainder of the AHL playoffs. He recorded 6 goals and 5 assists in 14 games during his time with the Admirals, who finished in second place in the Calder Cup, losing to the Hershey Bears in six games in the Calder Cup Finals.

It was during his sophomore season Weber evolved into one of Nashville's most important players. By the midpoint of the season, Weber already had 26 points, and his play was recognized on January 14, 2007, when he was named to the Western Conference roster for the 2007 NHL YoungStars Game in Dallas, Texas. Weber finished the season with 40 points, ranking eighth on the Predators' roster in total points. He added an additional three assists in five playoff games before the Predators were eliminated by San Jose for the second consecutive season.

Weber's third season with the Predators began with a series of injuries. After playing only 2:19 minutes of the first period in Nashville's season-opening game against the Colorado Avalanche, Weber fell awkwardly and dislocated his kneecap. The injury caused him to miss the next six weeks of play before returning to the Nashville line-up during a game with the St. Louis Blues on November 17, 2007. Weber was sidelined again shortly after, injuring his leg and missing another 11 games before he returned during a January 15, 2008, game against the Calgary Flames. Weber finished the season with 20 points in 54 games. He received a single fifth-place vote to tie for 17th with seven other players in James Norris Memorial Trophy voting as the NHL's best defenceman.

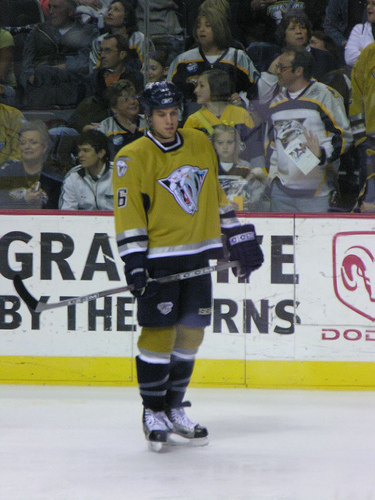
Weber with the Nashville Predators during the sophomore season. He was later named on the roster for the 2007 NHL YoungStars Game.

On June 23, 2008, Weber signed a three-year, $13.5 million contract extension with the Predators, avoiding restricted free agency. During his first year of the new contract, Weber established himself as one of the top defenceman in the NHL. At the mid-way point of the season, he was among the defencemen statistical leaders, was considered a favourite to win the Norris Trophy and was named to the Western Conference roster for the 2009 National Hockey League All-Star Game in Montreal. Weber finished the season with career-highs in all major statistical categories, including games played (81), goals (23), assists (30), points (53) and penalty minutes (80). His 23 goals set a new Predators franchise record for goals by a defenceman in a single season. Although he received no first-place votes, Weber finished fourth in the Norris Trophy voting with 186 voting points, behind winner Zdeno Chára (1,034 points) and runners-up Mike Green (982 points) and Nicklas Lidström (733 points). Weber narrowly missed being named to the NHL second All-Star team after receiving four-first place votes and 172 voting points, a single voting point behind Dan Boyle, the final defenceman selected.

Entering his fifth season with the Predators, Weber continued his stellar record. At the February Olympic break, Weber accumulated 35 points in 59 games for the Predators. He also established a strong leadership role and willingness to defend his teammates, highlighted by three consecutive games in March 2010 in which he fought opposing players. Weber's offensive production slowed after the Olympic break and he finished the season with 43 points in 78 games played. Despite a decrease in offence from the previous season, Weber was a Norris Trophy candidate for the third consecutive year, receiving one first-place vote and 96 voting points to finish as the sixth runner-up behind winner Duncan Keith (1,096 points). Weber also received a single fifth-place vote, tying for 23rd with six other players in Hart Memorial Trophy voting, and was the seventh-ranked defenceman in NHL All-Star team voting with 83 voting points.

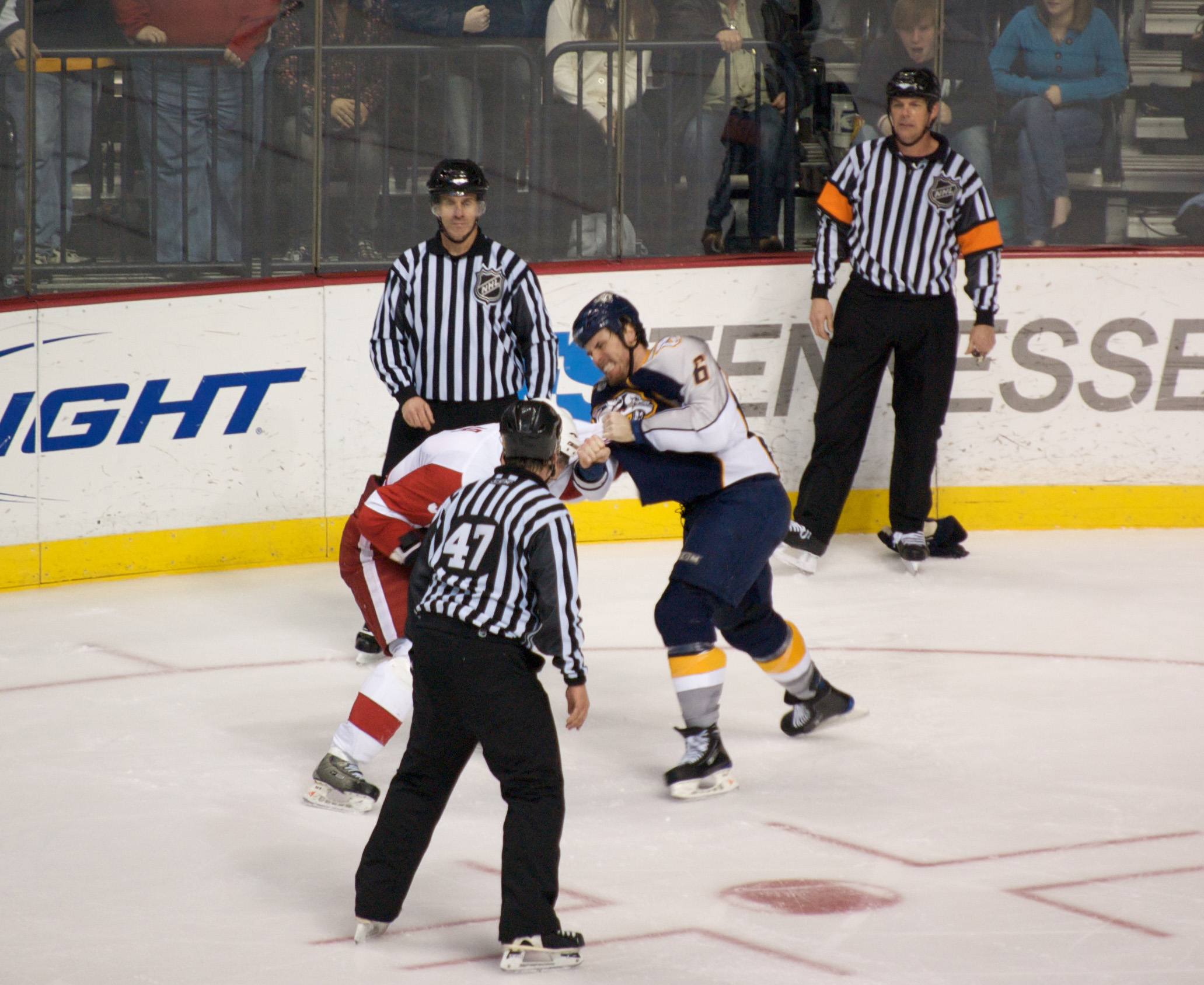
Weber (right) in a fight with Andreas Lilja (left) of the Detroit Red Wings during a game in February 2009

On July 8, 2010, Weber was named the fifth captain in Nashville Predators history, replacing Jason Arnott, who was traded to the New Jersey Devils. He became the youngest captain in franchise history and the only Predators captain to have been drafted by the team. Weber recorded his 200th career NHL point—an assist—in a game against the Detroit Red Wings on February 9, 2011. At the conclusion of the 2010–11 season, Weber was named one of three finalists—along with Zdeno Chára and Nicklas Lidström—for the Norris Trophy, the first finalist nomination of his career. He finished second in Norris Trophy voting, losing with 727 voting points to Lidström's 736. For the first time in his career, Weber was voted to the NHL first All-Star team after receiving 445 voting points, second among defencemen to Lidström's 464. Entering the first round of the 2011 playoffs as the fifth seed in the Western Conference, Weber and the Predators would defeat the fourth seeded Anaheim Ducks in six games, marking the first time in Weber's career and in Predators history where a playoff series was won. After upsetting the Ducks in the opening round, Weber and the Predators would go on to lose in the second round to the Presidents' Trophy-winning Vancouver Canucks in six games.

Although Weber became a restricted free agent on July 1, he said he wanted to remain with the Predators. To prevent the possibility of other teams signing him to an offer sheet, the Predators filed for salary arbitration with Weber, giving the team and Weber until their hearing to negotiate a new contract. Failing to come to terms on a new contract by their hearing, Weber's case went to arbitration on August 2, the first time in NHL history a team-elected arbitration candidate had reached a hearing. The following day, he was awarded a one-year, $7.5 million contract from which the Predators could not walk away, as the team had opted for arbitration.

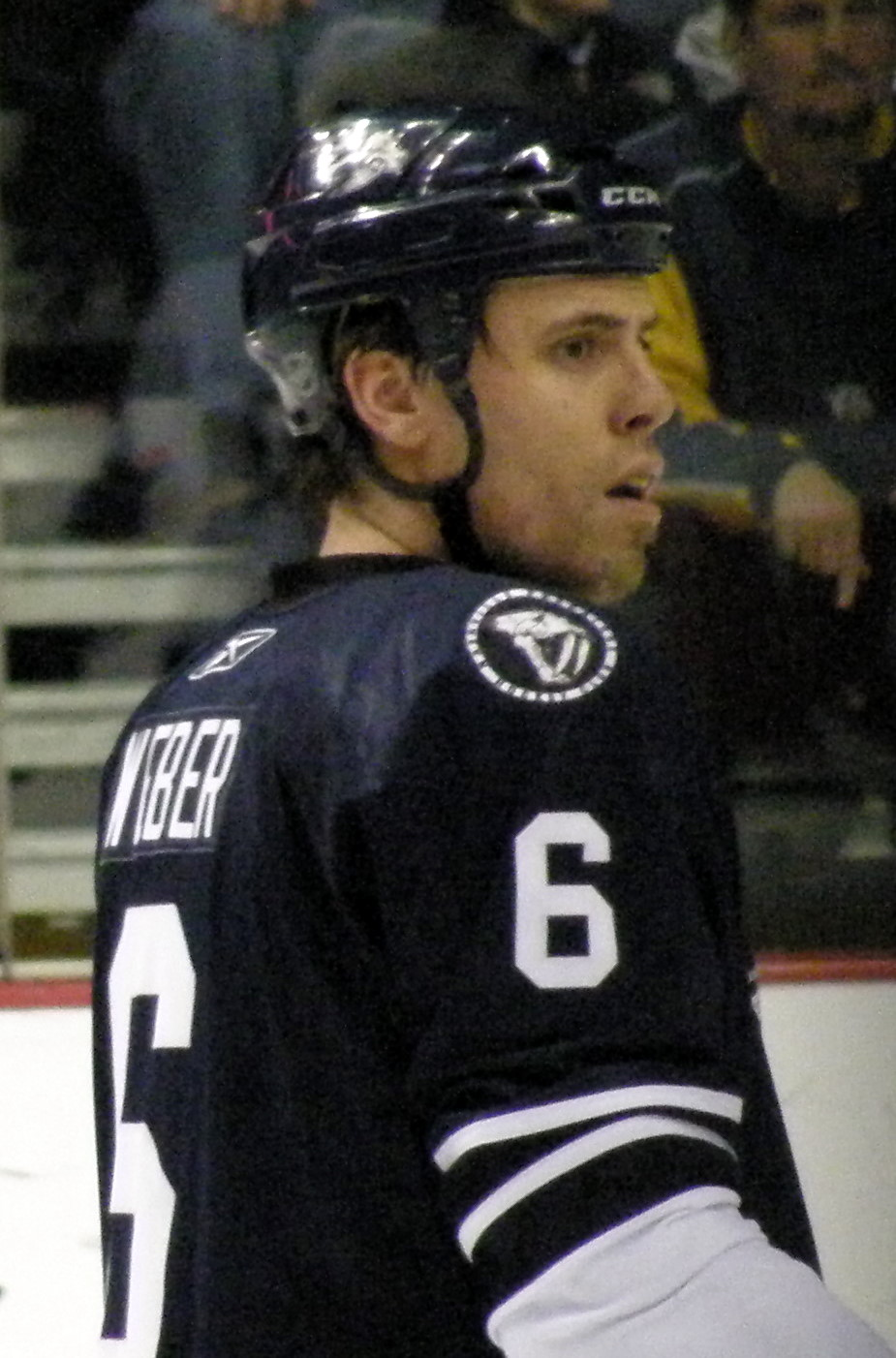
Weber with Nashville in February 2010

In the first month of the 2011–12 season, Weber hit forward Jannik Hansen from behind in a game against the Vancouver Canucks on October 20, 2011. While Hansen was uninjured on the play, Weber was fined $2,500 – the maximum allowable financial penalty – by the NHL the following day.

In Nashville's first game of the 2012 Stanley Cup Quarterfinals, against Detroit, Weber slammed centre Henrik Zetterberg's head into the glass boards during the closing seconds of the game after being hit by Zetterberg. The force of the blow cracked Zetterberg's helmet but he suffered no injury and played in the next game. As punishment, the NHL imposed a $2,500 fine (the maximum allowable under the NHL Collective Bargaining Agreement [CBA] at the time) on Weber for retaliatory action. NHL commissioner Gary Bettman was in attendance at this game. Weber finished the regular season leading all defencemen in shorthanded goals scored, with two.

In the 2012 off-season, with the Predators unable to take Weber to arbitration again (a player can only be subjected to team-elected arbitration once in his career), Weber signed a front-loaded $110 million, 14-year offer sheet ($68 million of it as a signing bonus) from the Philadelphia Flyers on July 19. The offer sheet was the richest in NHL history in terms of total money, money per season, and length; surpassing the previous offer sheet record set by Thomas Vanek. Already having lost Weber's defensive partner Ryan Suter to unrestricted free agency, the Predators matched the offer sheet five days later. Following the 2012–13 NHL lockout, the CBA was changed to prevent teams from signing other players to similar deals.

For the 2013–14 season, Weber led all NHL defencemen with 23 goals, which also matched his career-high. He broke Kimmo Timonen's Predator record for single-season points by a defenceman with 56 points, which also led the Predators for the season. On April 28, Weber was named a finalist for the Norris Trophy for the third time in his career; the other finalists were Boston Bruins captain Zdeno Chára and Duncan Keith of the Chicago Blackhawks, the latter of which won the award. Weber finished third in voting.

Weber was again voted to the NHL second All-Star team for the 2014–2015 season, his fourth postseason All-Star team selection.

During the 2015–16 season, Weber recorded his first career hat-trick on December 5 against the Detroit Red Wings, which was also the first-ever by a Predators defenceman. Weber would continue his goal-scoring ways, tying Paul Kariya's franchise record for power-play goals in a season with 14 and finishing with his third 20+ goal season. Weber was also named a finalist for the Mark Messier Leadership Award, which he won.

=== Montreal Canadiens (2016–2022) ===
On June 29, 2016, Weber was traded to the Montreal Canadiens in exchange for P. K. Subban. The trade surprised many ice hockey fans because the details of this trade were kept strictly confidential until the deal was already made. Weber's first season with the Canadiens was rather successful offensively, recording 17 goals and 42 points in 78 games. In the 2017 Stanley Cup playoffs, Weber recorded three points during the team's first-round elimination to the New York Rangers.

Weber only managed to skate in 26 games for Montreal the following season after suffering a tendon tear in his left foot. During the 2018 off-season, it was announced he was expected to be out of the Canadiens lineup until mid-December.

On October 1, 2018, Weber was named the 30th captain of the Canadiens, replacing Max Pacioretty after he was traded to the Vegas Golden Knights on September 10. However, Weber did not join the Canadiens lineup until November 27 due to an injury during the offseason that required surgery. In his second game back, he scored two goals in a 5–2 win against the New York Rangers.

On February 2, 2021, Weber played his 1,000th game in a 5–3 win against the Vancouver Canucks. The rest of Weber's pandemic-shortened 2020–21 season was plagued by lingering injuries as he finished the season with six goals and 13 assists for 19 points in 48 games. Montreal barely reached the 2021 playoffs, where Weber continue to play injured. Even in those circumstances, he led the team's top defensive line and on-ice time, guiding them to a surprisingly deep playoff run that took them all the way to the Stanley Cup Finals. Montreal ended up losing to the Tampa Bay Lightning in five games.

In the 2021 off-season, Canadiens general manager Marc Bergevin announced that the physical toll of Weber's injuries was too significant for him to overcome and that he would not be playing in the 2021–22 season. Bergevin added that Weber might never play again, despite five years remaining on his contract.

Although Weber did not announce his retirement at this point, his former Canadiens teammate, Jonathan Drouin said in the fall of 2021 that Weber strongly indicated to him and other teammates that his career was over. According to Drouin, Weber was already "retired, basically" and "he's moving on". Drouin added that Weber had transitioned to an off-ice role helping the Canadiens' managers.

=== Later years ===
Weber spent the following five seasons on the long-term injured reserve list. On June 16, 2022, Weber's contract was traded by the Canadiens to the Vegas Golden Knights in exchange for Evgenii Dadonov. This trade was for salary cap purposes, and the Golden Knights did not expect him to ever play for them. On February 22, 2023, the Golden Knights traded Weber's contract and a fifth-round pick in 2023 to the Arizona Coyotes in exchange for Dysin Mayo. Weber's contract rights were acquired by the Utah Hockey Club on April 18, 2024, when the NHL Board of Governorsapproved an expansion franchise for Salt Lake City beginning in 2024–25, and allowed the new team to acquire the Coyotes' hockey assets. On March 7, 2025, Weber’s contract was traded to the Chicago Blackhawks in exchange for a sixth-round pick in 2026.

Weber was inducted into the Hockey Hall of Fame in 2024. Although he was still under contract, he had not played a meaningful game in three years, and was inducted in his first year of eligibility. At a video conference to announce his induction, Weber revealed that he had never really recovered from two devastating injuries in the 2017-18 season. In the season opener against the Buffalo Sabres, he blocked a Jack Eichel slap shot, and it hit his left foot so hard that it was broken near the ankle. He tried to play through it, leading to the tendon damage that ended his season. He underwent an extremely delicate surgery to repair the foot and ankle in March 2018. Three months later, he went in for arthroscopic surgery on his right knee, only to discover his knee had more severe damage than first thought, requiring surgery that kept him out of the lineup until December. For the next three years, Weber said, he played through intense pain. By the COVID-shortened 2019-20 season, he had to undergo extensive pain management just to be in a condition to skate. By the 2020-21 season, the pain was so excruciating he couldn't even walk at times, leading him to conclude during the run to the Stanley Cup Final that his career was over. Three years later, he took part in a charity slo-pitch softball game and was unable to walk for two weeks.

== International play ==
Shea Weber
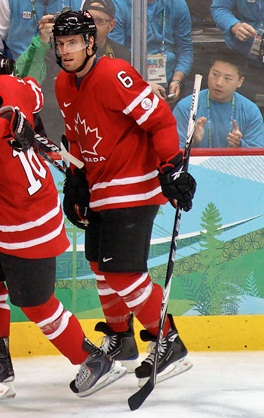
- Weber with Canada at the 2010 Winter Olympics

Medal record

Representing Canada

Men's ice hockey

Olympic Games
Gold medal – first place	2010 Vancouver	
Gold medal – first place	2014 Sochi	

World Championships
Gold medal – first place	2007 Russia	
Silver medal – second place	2009 Switzerland	

Canada Cup / World Cup
Gold medal – first place	2016 Toronto	

World Junior Championships
Gold medal – first place	2005 United States	

Throughout his career, Weber has represented Canada at several international ice hockey tournaments. His first experience with Hockey Canada came for the national junior team, when, on December 22, 2004, he was named to the roster for the 2005 World Junior Ice Hockey Championships in Grand Forks, North Dakota. There, his play with Dion Phaneuf formed the team's top defensive pair, helping Canada win its first junior gold medal since the 1997 tournament. Despite being held pointless throughout the tournament, Weber finished tied for third among plus-minus leaders with a rating of +10.

Weber debuted with the national senior team on April 22, 2007, accepting an invitation to join the club for the 2007 IIHF World Championship in Russia. However, his experience in this tournament was interrupted by an incident for which he was suspended three games. One minute into Canada's preliminary round game against Germany, Weber hit Yannic Seidenberg in the chin with his elbow, giving the German a concussion and sidelining him for the remainder of the tournament. After serving his suspension, Weber continued with the tournament, finishing with two points in six games, including a goal in Canada's 5–1 quarter-final victory over Switzerland. Canada went on to win the gold medal in the tournament, defeating Finland 4–2 in the final.

On April 14, 2009, Weber was named to the national senior team for the 2009 IIHF World Championship in Switzerland, as one of four alternate captains. In Canada's final preliminary round game, Weber was named Canada's VIP after scoring one goal and three assists as Canada defeated Slovakia 7–3. Weber finished the tournament with four goals and eight assists for 12 points in nine games played, leading all defencemen in tournament scoring and finishing tied for third overall among all skaters. Despite being defeated by Russia 2–1 in the gold medal game, Weber was named to the tournament all-star team and was awarded the tournament's Best Defenceman award.

On July 2, 2009, Weber was invited to the Canadian orientation camp for the 2010 Winter Olympics in Vancouver. On December 30, 2009, he was named to the final Canadian roster for the tournament. In Canada's qualification round game against Germany, Weber scored Canada's second goal of the game in an 8–2 victory. His shot passed through the mesh net behind German goaltender Thomas Greiss and a video review was required to award the goal. Weber finished the tournament with six points in seven games, ranking second amongst defencemen in terms of scoring, and was named to the tournament's all-star team, which defeated the United States 3–2 in overtime to win the gold medal. Weber, along with his British Columbian teammates from the Olympic team, were inducted into the BC Sports Hall of Fame in 2011.

After his Nashville Predators failed to make the 2013 Stanley Cup playoffs, Weber was considered a lock for the 2013 World Championship team, but Hockey Canada deemed the cost of insuring his large NHL contract too high and ultimately did not select him.

Weber was named an alternate captain for Canada in the 2014 Winter Olympics in Sochi, where Canada repeated as gold medallists. He was also an alternate captain for Canada's champion team at the 2016 World Cup in Toronto.

== Personal life ==
Weber has a brother, Brandon, who is two years younger. Brandon grew up playing hockey with Shea's former Predators teammate Cody Franson.

When Weber was 14, his mother underwent surgery to remove brain tumors, but in early 2010 had a series of seizures, was placed in an induced coma, and died on August 11, 2010.

On July 20, 2013, Weber married Bailey Munro, who he had met while playing junior hockey in Kelowna. The couple has three children.

== Career statistics ==
=== Regular season and playoffs ===
			Regular season					Playoffs
Season	Team	League	GP	G	A	Pts	PIM	GP	G	A	Pts	PIM
2001–02	Sicamous Eagles	KIJHL	47	9	33	42	87	—	—	—	—	—
2001–02	Kelowna Rockets	WHL	5	0	0	0	0	—	—	—	—	—
2002–03	Kelowna Rockets	WHL	70	2	16	18	167	19	1	4	5	26
2003–04	Kelowna Rockets	WHL	60	12	20	32	126	17	3	14	17	16
2004–05	Kelowna Rockets	WHL	55	12	29	41	95	18	9	8	17	25
2005–06	Milwaukee Admirals	AHL	46	12	15	27	49	14	6	5	11	16
2005–06	Nashville Predators	NHL	28	2	8	10	42	4	2	0	2	8
2006–07	Nashville Predators	NHL	79	17	23	40	60	5	0	3	3	2
2007–08	Nashville Predators	NHL	54	6	14	20	49	6	1	3	4	6
2008–09	Nashville Predators	NHL	81	23	30	53	80	—	—	—	—	—
2009–10	Nashville Predators	NHL	78	16	27	43	36	6	2	1	3	4
2010–11	Nashville Predators	NHL	82	16	32	48	56	12	3	2	5	8
2011–12	Nashville Predators	NHL	78	19	30	49	46	10	2	1	3	9
2012–13	Nashville Predators	NHL	48	9	19	28	48	—	—	—	—	—
2013–14	Nashville Predators	NHL	79	23	33	56	52	—	—	—	—	—
2014–15	Nashville Predators	NHL	78	15	30	45	72	2	0	1	1	2
2015–16	Nashville Predators	NHL	78	20	31	51	27	14	3	4	7	18
2016–17	Montreal Canadiens	NHL	78	17	25	42	38	6	1	2	3	5
2017–18	Montreal Canadiens	NHL	26	6	10	16	14	—	—	—	—	—
2018–19	Montreal Canadiens	NHL	58	14	19	33	28	—	—	—	—	—
2019–20	Montreal Canadiens	NHL	65	15	21	36	33	10	3	2	5	16
2020–21	Montreal Canadiens	NHL	48	6	13	19	33	22	1	5	6	28
NHL totals			1,038	224	365	589	714	97	18	24	42	106

=== International ===
Year	Team	Event	Result	GP	G	A	Pts	PIM
2005	Canada	WJC	1st place, gold medalist(s)	6	0	0	0	10
2007	Canada	WC	1st place, gold medalist(s)	6	1	1	2	31
2009	Canada	WC	2nd place, silver medalist(s)	9	4	8	12	6
2010	Canada	Oly	1st place, gold medalist(s)	7	2	4	6	2
2014	Canada	Oly	1st place, gold medalist(s)	6	3	3	6	0
2016	Canada	WCH	1st place, gold medalist(s)	5	0	0	0	0
Junior totals				6	0	0	0	10
Senior totals				33	10	16	26	39

== Awards and achievements ==
=== CHL / WHL ===
Award	Year(s)
Cyclone Taylor Cup champion	2002
Keystone Cup champion	2002
Ed Chynoweth Cup champion	2003
WHL West second All-Star team	2004
Memorial Cup champion	2004
Memorial Cup All-Star team	2004
WHL airBC Trophy	2005
WHL West first All-Star team	2005
CHL second All-Star team	2005

=== NHL ===
Award	Year(s)
NHL YoungStars Game	2007
NHL All-Star Game	2009, 2011, 2012, 2015, 2016, 2017, 2020
All-Star Game SuperSkills Hardest Shot Winner	2015, 2016, 2017, 2020
NHL first All-Star team	2011, 2012
NHL second All-Star team	2014, 2015
Mark Messier Leadership Award	2016

=== International ===
Award	Year(s)
World Championship All-Star team	2009
World Championship Best Defenceman	2009
Winter Olympic All-Star team	2010

Awards
Preceded by Kevin Nastiuk	Winner of the WHL's airBC Trophy; 2005	Succeeded by Gilbert Brulé
Sporting positions
Preceded by Jason Arnott	Nashville Predators captain 2010–2016	Succeeded by Mike Fisher
Preceded by Max Pacioretty	Montreal Canadiens captain 2018–2022	Succeeded by Nick Suzuki
