= Ryan Christie (ice hockey) =

Canadian ice hockey player (born 1978)

- Born: July 3, 1978 (age 47) Beamsville, Ontario, Canada
- Height: 6 ft 2 in (188 cm)
- Weight: 175 lb (79 kg; 12 st 7 lb)
- Position: Left wing
- Shot: Left
- Played for: Dallas Stars; Calgary Flames; Milano Vipers; Mulhouse
- NHL draft: 112th overall, 1996; Dallas Stars
- Playing career: 1998–2014

Ryan Christie (born July 3, 1978) is a Canadian former professional ice hockey player. He played seven games in the National Hockey League for the Dallas Stars and Calgary Flames. The rest of his career, which lasted from 1998 to 2014, was mainly spent in the minor leagues.

== Career ==
Drafted 112th overall by the Stars in the 1996 NHL entry draft, Christie played seven games in the NHL (five for the Stars and two for the Flames) scoring no points and no penalty minutes. He previously played in Italy for Milano Vipers, leading them to the Serie A title in 2006, their fifth championship in a row, leading the team in goals with 21 and penalty minutes with 98. The following season, Christie led the team in goals with 16 (along with Brett Lysak) but Milano lost out on another championship to SG Cortina.

== Career statistics ==
=== Regular season and playoffs ===
			Regular season					Playoffs
Season	Team	League	GP	G	A	Pts	PIM	GP	G	A	Pts	PIM
1994–95	St. Catharines Falcons	GHL	40	10	11	21	96	—	—	—	—	—
1995–96	Owen Sound Platers	OHL	66	29	17	46	93	6	1	1	2	0
1996–97	Owen Sound Platers	OHL	66	23	29	52	136	4	1	1	2	8
1997–98	Owen Sound Platers	OHL	66	39	41	80	208	11	3	5	8	13
1998–99	Michigan K-Wings	IHL	48	4	5	9	74	3	1	1	2	2
1999–00	Dallas Stars	NHL	5	0	0	0	0	—	—	—	—	—
1999–00	Michigan K-Wings	IHL	76	24	25	49	140	—	—	—	—	—
2000–01	Utah Grizzlies	IHL	69	22	16	38	88	—	—	—	—	—
2001–02	Calgary Flames	NHL	2	0	0	0	0	—	—	—	—	—
2001–02	Saint John Flames	AHL	77	21	18	39	61	—	—	—	—	—
2002–03	Saint John Flames	AHL	67	10	14	24	84	—	—	—	—	—
2003–04	Toronto Roadrunners	AHL	3	0	0	0	0	—	—	—	—	—
2003–04	Las Vegas Wranglers	ECHL	60	16	11	27	142	4	3	1	4	2
2004–05	Mulhouse	FRA	25	12	11	23	121	10	3	4	7	18
2005–06	Milano Vipers	ITA	48	23	20	43	104	7	3	8	11	22
2006–07	Milano Vipers	ITA	31	15	24	39	77	9	3	2	5	10
2007–08	Dundas Real McCoys	MLH	27	23	20	43	71	10	12	7	19	16
2008–09	Dundas Real McCoys	MLH	23	26	26	52	57	9	8	8	16	12
2009–10	Dundas Real McCoys	MLH	18	20	23	43	32	11	10	11	21	32
2010–11	Dundas Real McCoys	MLH	8	6	14	20	8	13	9	9	18	14
2010–11	Dundas Real McCoys	Al-Cup	—	—	—	—	—	4	1	1	2	2
2011–12	Dundas Real McCoys	ACH	18	11	27	38	22	10	8	17	25	23
2012–13	Dundas Real McCoys	ACH	17	17	16	33	38	7	6	4	10	18
2013–14	Dundas Real McCoys	ACH	21	12	12	24	64	7	5	4	9	24
2013–14	Dundas Real McCoys	Al-Cup	—	—	—	—	—	4	3	3	6	14
AHL totals			147	31	32	63	145	—	—	—	—	—
IHL totals			193	50	46	96	302	3	1	1	2	2
NHL totals			7	0	0	0	0	—	—	—	—	—
