= Red Mile =

Celebration in Calgary during the 2004 Stanley Cup playoffs

Coordinates: 51°2′16″N 114°4′54″W

The Red Mile is the name given to a stretch of 17 Avenue SW in Calgary, Alberta, Canada during the Calgary Flames 2004 Stanley Cup playoff run, which ended with a loss to the Tampa Bay Lightning in seven games in the finals. It gained worldwide notoriety both for the relative lack of violence while upwards of 55,000 fans celebrated their team's success. The 'Red' originates from the home team colour of the Calgary Flames' jerseys, red, similarly characterized by the 'Sea of Red' seen at many home games in the Saddledome; 'Sea of Red' and 'C of Red' (for the Flames' flaming C) is a play on words.

== Electric Avenue ==
The predecessor to the Red Mile was a bar strip on 11th Avenue S.W. known as Electric Avenue, where thousands of Flames fans celebrated during the 1986 and 1989 playoff runs. Concerns by the city about the violence encouraged by having so many bars in such close proximity ultimately led to the shut down of Electric Avenue in the early 1990s.

== 2004 Stanley Cup playoffs ==
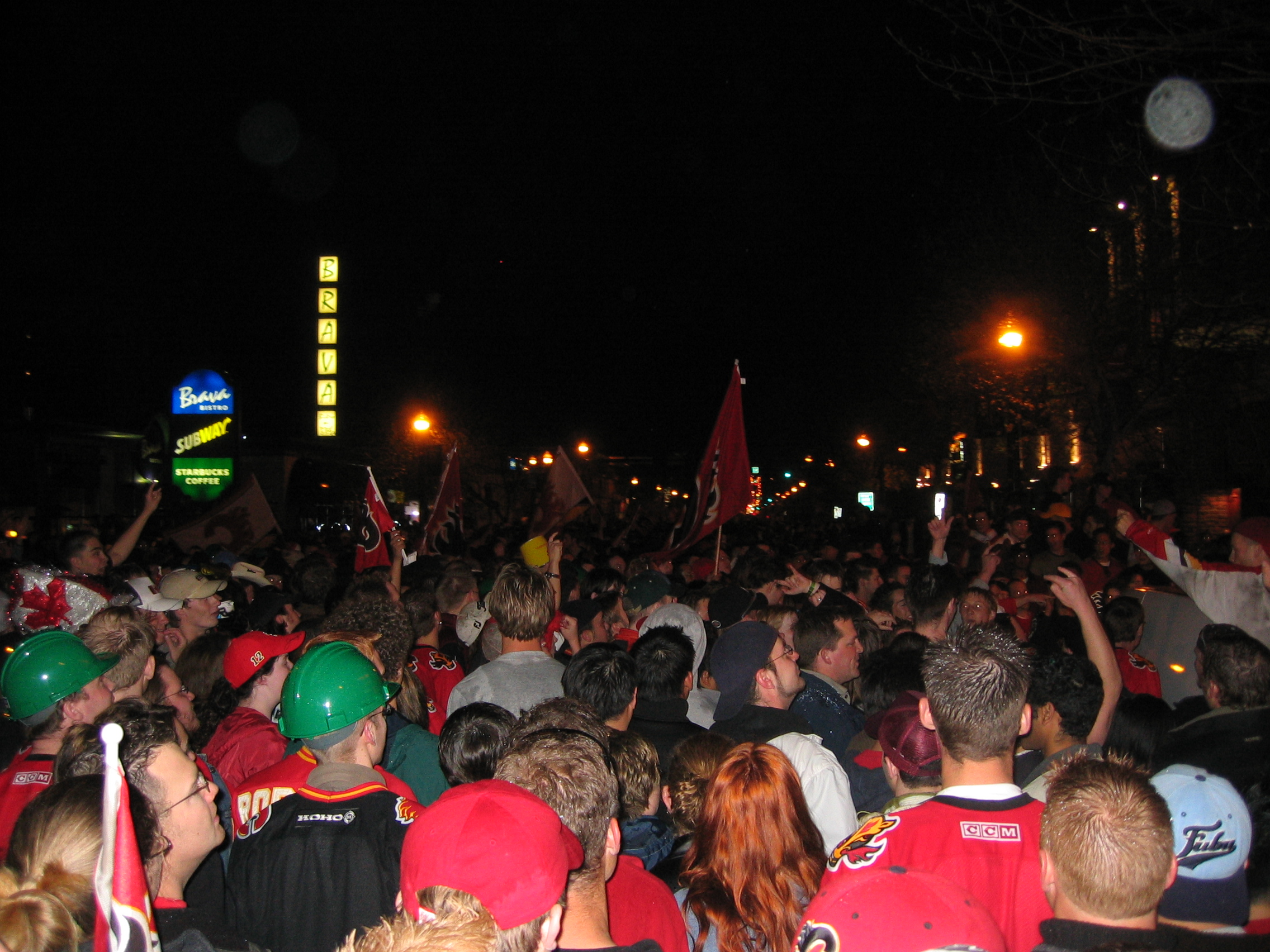
Typical celebration along the Red Mile

2004 marked the first time the Flames qualified for the NHL's Stanley Cup playoffs since 1996. The Red Mile's beginnings were relatively humble, and consisted of people driving down the Red Mile honking and waving flags, as people walked the streets cheering and clapping hands. Several thousand fans went to bars along 17th Avenue S.W. to watch the Flames on the road against the Vancouver Canucks in the first round, and also to watch the team play at the nearby Pengrowth Saddledome for home games. When the Flames eliminated the Canucks in the seventh and deciding game by Martin Gelinas' overtime goal, fans flooded the streets in a relatively spontaneous party celebrating the Flames first playoff series victory since the 1989 Stanley Cup Final against the Montreal Canadiens. The fact that this was spontaneous is a phenomenon in itself; there had been no advertising or other form of publicizing of 17th Avenue as an after-game party strip prior to the playoff run.

As the Flames progressed through the subsequent playoff series against the Detroit Red Wings, San Jose Sharks and Tampa Bay Lightning, the popularity of the Red Mile continued to grow, and along with it the party atmosphere. By the time of the seventh game of the Stanley Cup Final against Tampa, the city was expecting over 100,000 people would flood the area if the Flames were to win the Cup. This, however, was not to be as the Lightning defeated the Flames in Game 7, 2–1.

=== Celebration or exploitation? ===
The Red Mile's primary claim to fame was its relaxed attitude towards society's norms, as women bared their breasts to chants like "Flames in six, show us your tits" and "shirts off for Kiprusoff". The growing amount of nudity led to the creation of the flamesgirls.com website that featured hundreds of photos of women flashing the crowd.

The website, and the growing number of revelers with cameras in hand intent only on snapping photos of topless women caused critics to condemn it as little more than the exploitation of women. This argument was supported when the producers of the Girls Gone Wild pornography series came to Calgary in the summer of 2005 looking for material for its series.

However, University of Calgary professor Mary Valentich argued that the nudity was the result of "a complex set of factors, including a desire to celebrate the Flames victories, a desire to break the rules, feelings of stardom and a sense of history", and that many women did not feel that their actions were sexual in nature, but rather a part of the party.

=== Police presence ===
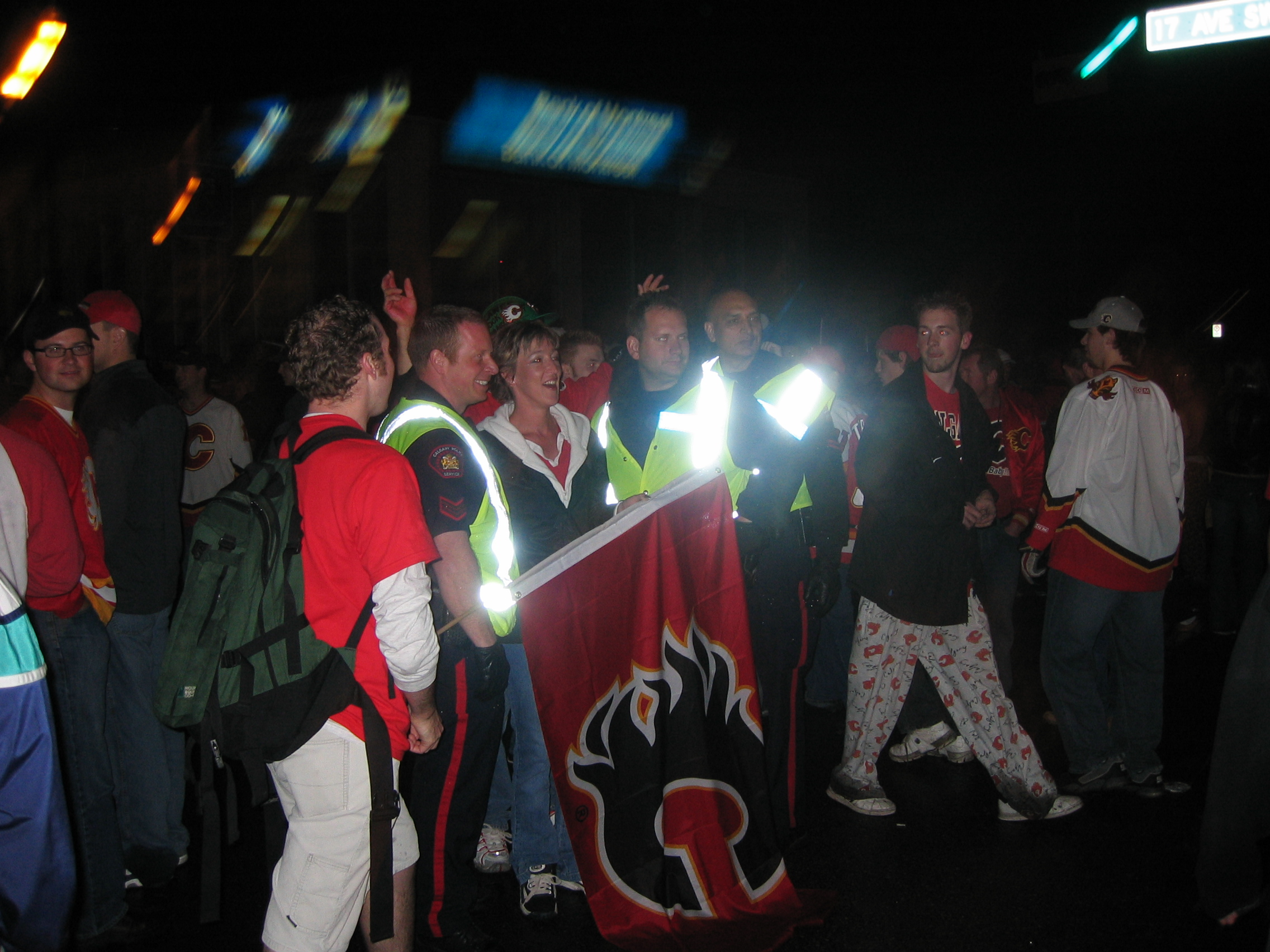
Police officers on the Red Mile

The city began closing off 17th Avenue S.W. to all vehicle traffic and enforcing strict parking laws from 15:30 to 00:00 every game day. The police presence included scores of police officers involved in keeping everything under control through patrols down the street, standing in lines along the street, forming circles of officers in intersections, officers on bicycles, a number of police cars, and the police helicopter, HAWC1.

Despite the police presence, there were very few incidents involving police. For example, someone witnessed a drunken fan carrying open alcohol get pushed into a group of police officers, however the police officers simply confiscated the alcohol and then sent the person on their way. The attitude of the police officers seemed to discourage people from committing violent acts.

== 2006 controversy ==
Complaints about the noise and traffic tie-ups by some area businesses and residents led to the Calgary Police proposing to severely limit or shut down the Red Mile entirely for the 2006 playoffs. Police announced a zero-tolerance policy on jaywalking, public drunkenness and public nudity.

The policy was first enforced during a regular season game against the Mighty Ducks of Anaheim as dozens of officers patrolled the area between the Saddledome and 17th Avenue S.W. handing out nearly 500 tickets during their crackdown. Police justified the crackdown arguing that while there was a notable lack of violence in 2004, the potential remains high in such situations. The time and cost to police during was also a concern. As many as 300 officers patrolled the Red Mile, including the police helicopter, at a cost of over $1 million. The reason for the police presence was that the game was seen as a preview of the opening round of the 2006 Stanley Cup playoffs which featured Anaheim vs Calgary. The game was the final game of the regular season for both teams.

Despite their attempts, police were unable to stop fans from overwhelming the street following the Flames 2–1 overtime victory in the first game of the 2006 playoffs, as over 10,000 fans packed the Red Mile. No major incidents were reported. However, following the Flames' game five victory, police reported that some of the estimated 18,000 fans on the mile were lighting firecrackers in the crowd, and had thrown bottles at officers. One officer suffered a cut, and 12 people were arrested for various offenses.

== 2015 Stanley Cup playoffs ==
Following a first round series win as the Calgary Flames eliminated the Vancouver Canucks in game 6 of the series at the Scotiabank Saddledome, fans flocked to the Red Mile once again. There was between 10,000 and 12,000 fans on the stretch of 17th Avenue in Calgary. Police in Calgary had limited reports of open alcohol and minor property damage, but overall it was said to have been a peaceful celebration. Staff Sgt. Steve Ellefson of the Calgary Police Service said fans behaved well: “When you have 10 to 12,000 fans out, it just goes to show the class of the Flames fans enjoying a win”.

== 2022 Stanley Cup playoffs ==
Following one of the most successful regular seasons in franchise history, Calgary Flames fans once again returned to the Red Mile on 17 Avenue SW. Prior to the 2022 Stanley Cup playoffs, representatives from local businesses as well as residents met with Calgary Police to discuss how crowds would be controlled during the Flames playoff run. Following years of COVID restrictions, some of those participants were positive and ready to welcome the city. A recent injunction restricting unsanctioned gatherings related to COVID restrictions was lifted just in time for Calgarians to celebrate as a community. In preparation for Round 1, the City of Calgary put a parking ban in place along the Red Mile for home playoff games, along with alcohol only allowed inside licensed establishments, no public consumption of cannabis, and an increased police and peace officer presence.
