= Scorpions de Mulhouse (1997–2005) =

Mulhouse Scorpions
- City: Mulhouse, France
- League: Ligue Magnus
- Founded: 1997
- Home arena: Patinoire de l'Illberg
- Colours: Red, Black

The Mulhouse Scorpions is a French ice hockey team in Mulhouse that operated from 1997 to 2005. In 2001, the club was promoted to the Ligue Magnus. They won the Ligue Magnus in 2005, and folded after that season.

== Notable players ==
- Richard Aimonetto
- Juraj Faith
- Alexander Kuzminski
- Fabrice Lhenry
- Steve Montador
- Jukka Ollila
- Miroslav Pažák
- Steven Reinprecht
- Luc Tardif Jr.
