= Steven Reinprecht =

Canadian ice hockey player

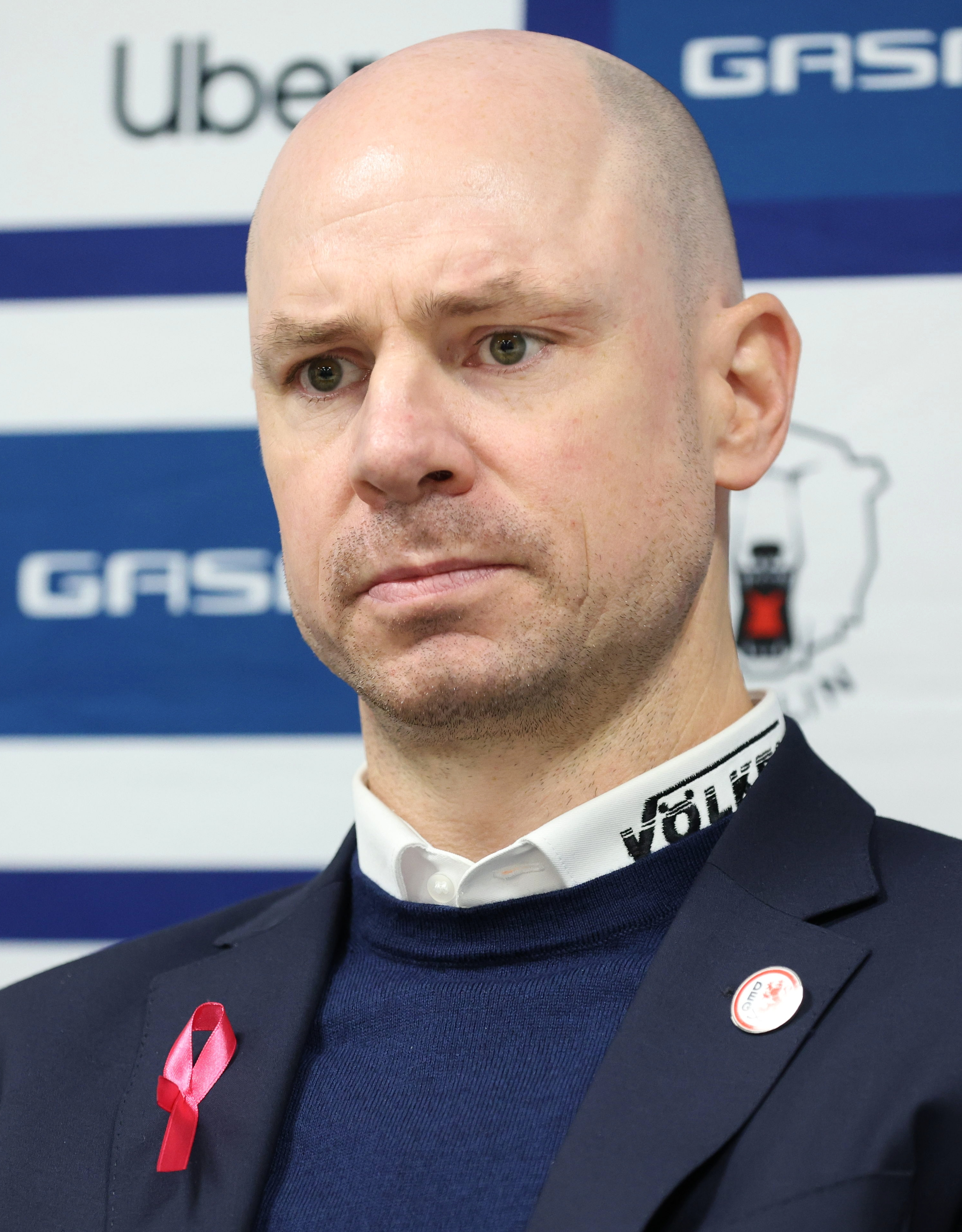
- Reinprecht in 2024
- Born: May 7, 1976 (age 50) Edmonton, Alberta, Canada
- Height: 6 ft 0 in (183 cm)
- Weight: 195 lb (88 kg; 13 st 13 lb)
- Position: Centre
- Shot: Left
- Played for: Los Angeles Kings; Colorado Avalanche; Calgary Flames; Phoenix Coyotes; Florida Panthers; Adler Mannheim; Nürnberg Ice Tigers
- National team: Canada
- NHL draft: Undrafted
- Playing career: 2000–2018

Steven Edward Reinprecht (born May 7, 1976) is a Canadian former professional ice hockey forward.

Undrafted into the NHL, he was signed as a free agent following his NCAA career with the Wisconsin Badgers by the Los Angeles Kings. During his rookie season, he was traded to the Colorado Avalanche and went on to win a Stanley Cup championship that year with the team. Reinprecht has additionally played for the Calgary Flames, Phoenix Coyotes and Florida Panthers. Later, he took his game to the German DEL. Representing the Canadian national team, he won gold at the 2003 World Championships.

He typically played at the centre position and was known for his two-way versatility. He was named to the University of Wisconsin-Madison Athletic Hall of Fame in 2014.

== Playing career ==
As a youth, Reinprecht played in the 1989 and 1990 Quebec International Pee-Wee Hockey Tournaments with the Edmonton Oilers minor ice hockey team.

Reinprecht signed as a free agent straight out from college with the Los Angeles Kings in 2000. In his rookie season, Reinprecht was included in the blockbuster trade that brought Rob Blake to the Colorado Avalanche in 2001, where he helped the Avs win the Stanley Cup.

Reinprecht was traded to the Calgary Flames on July 3, 2003. He missed the last four months of the 2003–04 season after surgery on his left shoulder. He played for HC Mulhouse in the Nationale 1 division of the French league during the 2004–05 NHL lockout, where he led the team in points, assists and tied-first in goals, before returning to the Flames for the 2005–06 NHL season.

The Flames traded him to the Phoenix Coyotes on February 1, 2006, in a deal also involving Philippe Sauvé, Mike Leclerc and Brian Boucher.

After the 2008–09 season and three years with the Coyotes, Reinprecht's rights were traded to the Florida Panthers on June 19, 2009 in exchange for forward Stefan Meyer. The Panthers then signed him to a three-year deal. In the 2010–11 season, his second year with the rebuilding Panthers, Reinprecht was demoted as a reserve forward and played sparingly in 29 games. Going unclaimed on waivers, Reinprecht was then loaned to German team, Adler Mannheim for the remainder of the season on January 6, 2011. In 18 games with the Eagles he scored 4 goals and 13 points, and after suffering a Quarterfinal defeat in the Playoffs he returned for the final year of his contract with the Panthers. Still without a roster spot in Florida, Reinprecht was assigned to the American Hockey League (AHL) for the first time in his career for the 2011–12 season.

While playing for the Panthers' minor league affiliate, the San Antonio Rampage, he was traded by Florida on October 22, 2011. Included in a deal with forward David Booth and a 3rd round pick in the 2013 NHL entry draft, he was sent to the Vancouver Canucks for veteran forwards Mikael Samuelsson and Marco Sturm. Reinprecht remained in the AHL, having been assigned to the Canucks' minor league affiliate, the Chicago Wolves, but the team made it clear that they would call him back up to the NHL for the playoffs, as he would no longer require recall waivers and his salary cap hit would not apply.

With the 2012 NHL lockout in effect, and subsequently quashing any thought of an NHL contract, Reinprecht returned for a second stint in Germany, signing with the Thomas Sabo Ice Tigers of Nürnberg where he established himself among the leading scorers of the German elite league Deutsche Eishockey Liga (DEL) in the following years: In 2013–14, he ranked second in the DEL in total points with 70 and led the league in this category (67 points in 52 games) in 2014–15. In February 2016, he signed another contract extension with the Nürnberg team for the 2016–17 season. Reinprecht completed the 2015-16 DEL regular season with 55 points (19 goals, 36 assists) in 46 games which ranked him second in the league.

In April 2018, Reinprecht ended his playing career at the age of 41. In his six-year Nürnberg stint, he had scored 330 points in 318 games and had his jersey number 28 retired by the club. He returned to the U.S. and in June 2018 was named volunteer assistant coach of the University of Denver men's hockey team. The following year, he returned to his old team, the Colorado Avalanche, to work in their player development department.

== Career statistics ==
=== Regular season and playoffs ===
			Regular season					Playoffs
Season	Team	League	GP	G	A	Pts	PIM	GP	G	A	Pts	PIM
1993–94	SSAC Athletics AAA	AMHL	71	48	77	125		—	—	—	—	—
1994–95	St. Albert Saints	AJHL	56	35	44	79	14	—	—	—	—	—
1995–96	St. Albert Saints	AJHL	39	24	33	57	16	—	—	—	—	—
1996–97	University of Wisconsin–Madison	WCHA	38	11	9	20	12	—	—	—	—	—
1997–98	University of Wisconsin–Madison	WCHA	41	19	24	43	18	—	—	—	—	—
1998–99	University of Wisconsin–Madison	WCHA	38	16	17	33	14	—	—	—	—	—
1999–2000	University of Wisconsin–Madison	WCHA	37	26	40	66	14	—	—	—	—	—
1999–2000	Los Angeles Kings	NHL	1	0	0	0	2	—	—	—	—	—
2000–01	Los Angeles Kings	NHL	59	12	17	29	12	—	—	—	—	—
2000–01	Colorado Avalanche	NHL	21	3	4	7	2	22	2	3	5	2
2001–02	Colorado Avalanche	NHL	67	19	27	46	18	21	7	5	12	8
2002–03	Colorado Avalanche	NHL	77	18	33	51	18	7	1	2	3	0
2003–04	Calgary Flames	NHL	44	7	22	29	4	—	—	—	—	—
2004–05	Scorpions de Mulhouse	FRA	22	20	27	47	6	10	7	6	13	2
2005–06	Calgary Flames	NHL	52	10	19	29	24	—	—	—	—	—
2005–06	Phoenix Coyotes	NHL	28	12	11	23	8	—	—	—	—	—
2006–07	Phoenix Coyotes	NHL	49	9	24	33	28	—	—	—	—	—
2007–08	Phoenix Coyotes	NHL	81	16	30	46	26	—	—	—	—	—
2008–09	Phoenix Coyotes	NHL	73	14	27	41	20	—	—	—	—	—
2009–10	Florida Panthers	NHL	82	16	22	38	18	—	—	—	—	—
2010–11	Florida Panthers	NHL	29	4	6	10	6	—	—	—	—	—
2010–11	Adler Mannheim	DEL	18	4	9	13	2	6	1	2	3	2
2011–12	San Antonio Rampage	AHL	5	0	0	0	0	—	—	—	—	—
2011–12	Chicago Wolves	AHL	57	13	40	53	14	4	2	1	3	2
2012–13	Thomas Sabo Ice Tigers	DEL	33	9	19	28	10	3	2	1	3	0
2013–14	Thomas Sabo Ice Tigers	DEL	49	27	43	70	12	6	0	6	6	16
2014–15	Thomas Sabo Ice Tigers	DEL	52	21	46	67	20	8	1	5	6	0
2015–16	Thomas Sabo Ice Tigers	DEL	46	19	36	55	6	12	3	5	8	4
2016–17	Thomas Sabo Ice Tigers	DEL	52	16	35	51	10	13	3	11	14	0
2017–18	Thomas Sabo Ice Tigers	DEL	28	9	10	19	4	11	2	1	3	0
NHL totals			663	140	242	382	186	50	10	10	20	10
DEL totals			278	105	198	303	64	59	12	31	43	22

=== International ===
Medal record

Representing Canada

World Championships
Gold medal – first place	2003 Helsinki	

Year	Team	Event	Result	GP	G	A	Pts	PIM
2003	Canada	WC	1st place, gold medalist(s)	8	0	6	6	2
Senior totals				8	0	6	6	2

== Awards and honors ==
Award	Year	Ref
College
WCHA Second Team	1997–98	
WCHA All-Academic Team	1998–99	
WCHA First All-Star Team	1999–00	
WCHA Player of the Year	1999–00	
AHCA West First-Team All-American	1999–00	
University of Wisconsin-Madison Athletic Hall of Fame	2014	
NHL
Stanley Cup champion	2001	

Awards and achievements
Preceded by Jason Blake	WCHA Player of the Year; 1999–00	Succeeded by Jeff Panzer
Preceded by Jason Krog	NCAA Ice Hockey Scoring Champion; 1999–00	Succeeded by Jeff Panzer
