= 2009 IIHF World Championship final =

Ice hockey match

	1	2	3	Total
Canada	1	0	0	1
Russia	1	1	0	2
- Date: May 10, 2009
- Arena: PostFinance Arena
- City: Bern
- Attendance: 11,454

The 2009 IIHF World Championship final was an ice hockey match that took place on 10 May 2009 at the PostFinance Arena in Bern, Switzerland, to determine the winner of the 2009 IIHF World Championship. Russia defeated Canada 2–1 to win its 3rd championship and its 2nd consecutive championship.

== Background ==
This was the second consecutive year that Russia and Canada had met in the final of a World Championship. It was Russia's fourth finals appearance, and they were defending champions having won in 2008, against Canada in a hard-fought 5-4 overtime win. It was Canada's sixth appearance in the finals in seven years. Leading up to the final, both Canada and Russia had a perfect 3 win group stage, and in the qualifying round they both topped their groups. In the semifinals, Russia narrowly defeated the United States with a goal with only about a minute remaining. Canada defeated Sweden 3-1.

== Venue ==
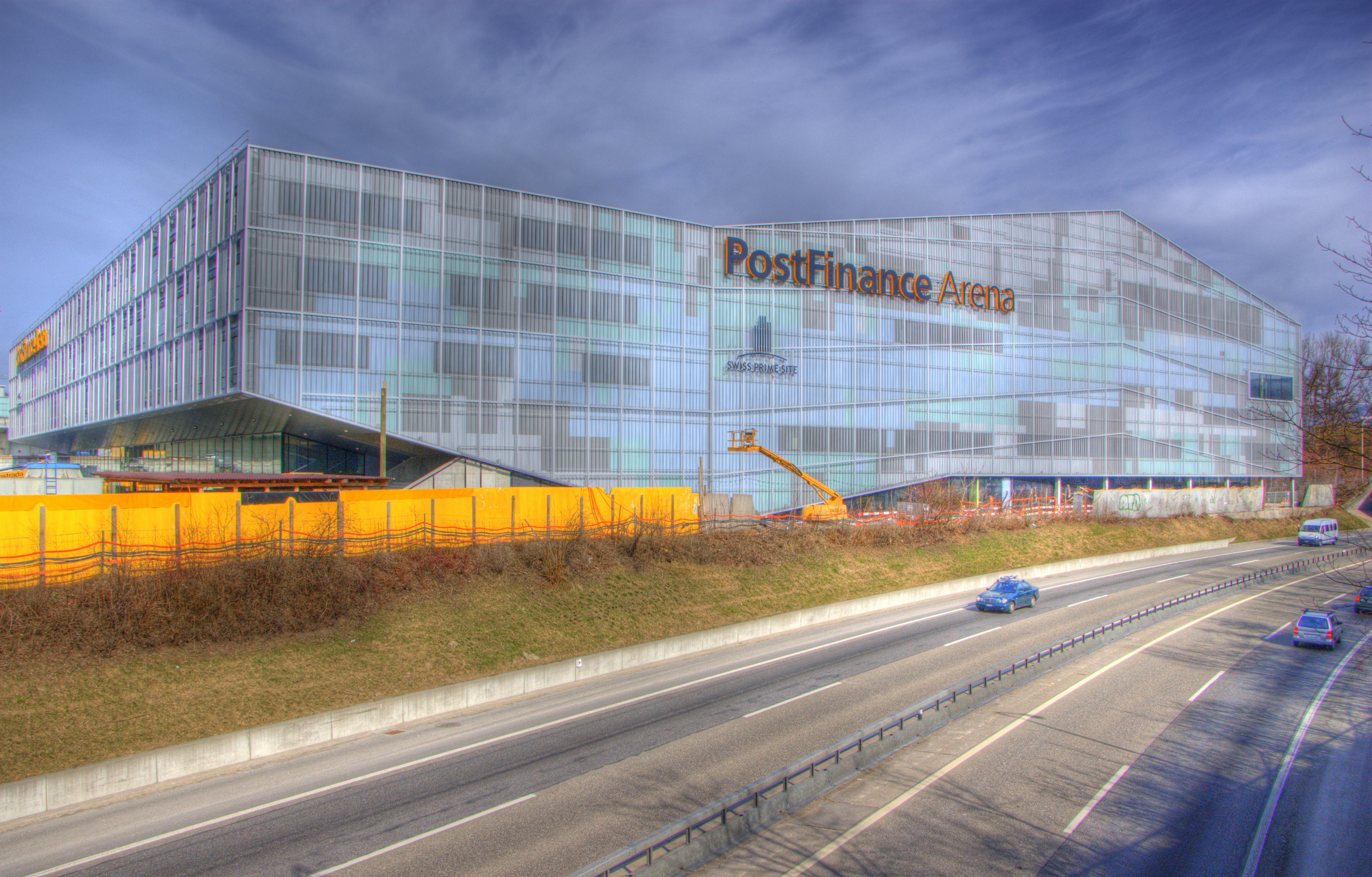
PostFinance Arena, Bern

The PostFinance Arena in Bern was determined to host the final of the championship. Previously at the tournament, the venue hosted both the semi-finals, and also the Bronze medal match. In the final, the attendance was 11,454.

== The Match ==
=== Summary ===
Canada struck first, when at 5:37 into the first period Jason Spezza scored just outside the crease on a pass from Shane Doan, who had only seconds ago come out of the penalty box. For several minutes the Canadians pressured, but Ilya Bryzgalov remained strong. Braydon Coburn took a penalty mid-way through the period, which led to a Russian power play. On the PP, Vitali Atyushov took a shot from the point, which was deflected by Oleg Saprykin through traffic past Dwayne Roloson, to tie up the game for team Russia.

On a 2-on-1, after a Canadian error on the blue line, Alexander Radulov carried the puck in and fired a shot on the far side which beat Roloson, at 14:50 in the second. This would end up as the winning goal.

In the third period team Canada brought up the offensive, with 16 shots in the third alone, and a total of 38 on the night, compared with only 19 shots total from Russia. However Bryzgalov was solid in net for Russia. With the 2-1 victory, Russia won its first ever consecutive championship final.

=== Details ===
10 May 2009; 20:30	Russia	2 – 1 (1–1, 1–0, 0–0)	Canada	PostFinance Arena, Bern; Attendance: 11,454

Game reference
	Referees: (Slovakia) Peter Ország (Finland) Jyri Rönn
O. Saprykin (PP1) 12:59; A. Radulov 34:30 / Goals / 05:37 J. Spezza	Referees: (Slovakia) Peter Ország (Finland) Jyri Rönn

== See also ==
- 2009 IIHF World Championship
- Canada men's national ice hockey team
- Russia men's national ice hockey team
