= 2004–05 Ligue Magnus season =

French professional ice hockey season

The 2004–05 Ligue Magnus season was the 84th regular season of the ice hockey elite league in France and the first to take the name of Ligue Magnus.

== Results ==
=== Regular season ===
| | Team | GP | Pts | W | Wot | T | LOT | L | GF | GA | Diff |
|---|---|---|---|---|---|---|---|---|---|---|---|
| 1 | Dragons de Rouen | 28 | 45 | 22 | 0 | 1 | 0 | 5 | 139 | 54 | +85 |
| 2 | Diables Noirs de Tours | 28 | 45 | 20 | 2 | 1 | 0 | 5 | 119 | 67 | +52 |
| 3 | Brûleurs de Loups de Grenoble | 28 | 45 | 16 | 3 | 4 | 3 | 2 | 119 | 59 | +60 |
| 4 | Scorpions de Mulhouse | 28 | 43 | 20 | 1 | 1 | 0 | 6 | 142 | 62 | +80 |
| 5 | Diables Rouges de Briançon | 28 | 39 | 16 | 2 | 2 | 1 | 7 | 126 | 76 | +50 |
| 6 | Pingouins de Morzine-Avoriaz | 28 | 33 | 10 | 3 | 2 | 5 | 8 | 101 | 86 | +15 |
| 7 | Ducs d'Angers | 28 | 32 | 11 | 2 | 1 | 5 | 9 | 96 | 91 | +5 |
| 8 | Gothiques d'Amiens | 28 | 30 | 15 | 0 | 0 | 0 | 13 | 97 | 78 | +19 |
| 9 | Orques d'Anglet | 28 | 29 | 12 | 2 | 1 | 0 | 13 | 105 | 113 | -8 |
| 10 | Ducs de Dijon | 28 | 24 | 8 | 3 | 1 | 1 | 15 | 81 | 101 | -20 |
| 11 | Ours de Villard-de-Lans | 28 | 21 | 7 | 2 | 1 | 2 | 16 | 64 | 107 | -43 |
| 12 | Rapaces de Gap | 28 | 16 | 5 | 1 | 2 | 2 | 18 | 57 | 112 | -55 |
| 13 | Sangliers Arvernes de Clermont | 28 | 16 | 4 | 3 | 2 | 0 | 19 | 66 | 128 | -62 |
| 14 | Corsaires de Dunkerque | 28 | 15 | 6 | 0 | 0 | 3 | 19 | 63 | 169 | -106 |
| 15 | Dauphins d'Épinal | 28 | 11 | 4 | 0 | 1 | 2 | 21 | 71 | 143 | -72 |

=== Playoffs ===
Quarter-finals
Dragons de Rouen | 3
Gothiques d'Amiens | 2
Scorpions de Mulhouse | 3
Diables Rouges de Briançon | 1
Diables Noirs de Tours | 3
Ducs d'Angers | 1
Brûleurs de Loups de Grenoble | 3
Pingouins de Morzine-Avoriaz | 1

Semi-finals
Dragons de Rouen | 1
Scorpions de Mulhouse | 3
Diables Noirs de Tours | 3
Brûleurs de Loups de Grenoble | 2

Final
Diables Noirs de Tours | 0
Scorpions de Mulhouse | 2
Third place
Dragons de Rouen | 1
Brûleurs de Loups de Grenoble | 2

=== National Pool ===
| | Team | GP | Pts | W | Wot | T | LOT | L | GF | GA | Diff |
|---|---|---|---|---|---|---|---|---|---|---|---|
| 1 | Ours de Villard-de-Lans | 6 | 11 | 4 | 1 | 1 | 0 | 0 | 32 | 19 | +13 |
| 2 | Ducs de Dijon | 6 | 7 | 3 | 0 | 1 | 0 | 2 | 34 | 27 | +7 |
| 3 | Rapaces de Gap | 6 | 4 | 2 | 0 | 0 | 0 | 4 | 23 | 36 | -13 |
| 4 | Orques d'Anglet | 6 | 3 | 1 | 0 | 0 | 1 | 4 | 28 | 35 | -7 |

=== Relegation Pool ===
| | Team | GP | Pts | W | Wot | T | LOT | L | GF | GA | Diff |
|---|---|---|---|---|---|---|---|---|---|---|---|
| 1 | Corsaires de Dunkerque | 4 | 6 | 3 | 0 | 0 | 0 | 1 | 14 | 9 | +5 |
| 2 | Dauphins d'Épinal | 4 | 3 | 1 | 0 | 1 | 0 | 2 | 11 | 12 | -1 |
| 3 | Sangliers Arvernes de Clermont | 4 | 3 | 1 | 0 | 1 | 0 | 2 | 11 | 15 | -4 |

=== Relegation matches ===
Clermont-Ferrand faces Caen, vice champion of Division 1 in two matches the 23 and 26 April 2005. After a tie in the first leg match 4-4, Caen won the serie in the second leg matches with a victory 8 to 2. Caen is promoted in Ligue Magnus at the expense of Clermont-Ferrand.

== Season Champion ==
Mulhouse win the first Magnus Cup in its history.

Clermont is relegated in Division 1, but due to financial difficulties, the club filed for bankruptcy. For similar reasons, Tours and Mulhouse were not allowed by the federation to rejoin ligue Magnus the next season. Tours is relegated to Division 2, Mulhouse filed for bankruptcy.

=== Trophies ===
- Best scorer (Charles Ramsey Trophy) : Steven Reinprecht (Mulhouse).
- Best French player (Albert Hassler Trophy): Laurent Meunier(Grenoble).
- Best goaltender (Jean Ferrand Trophy) : Fabrice Lhenry (Mulhouse).
- Best rookie (Jean-Pierre Graff Trophy): Pierre-Édouard Bellemare (Rouen).
- Best coach : Robert Millette (Tours).
- Best player : Steven Reinprecht (Mulhouse).
