= Cam Cunning =

Canadian ice hockey player

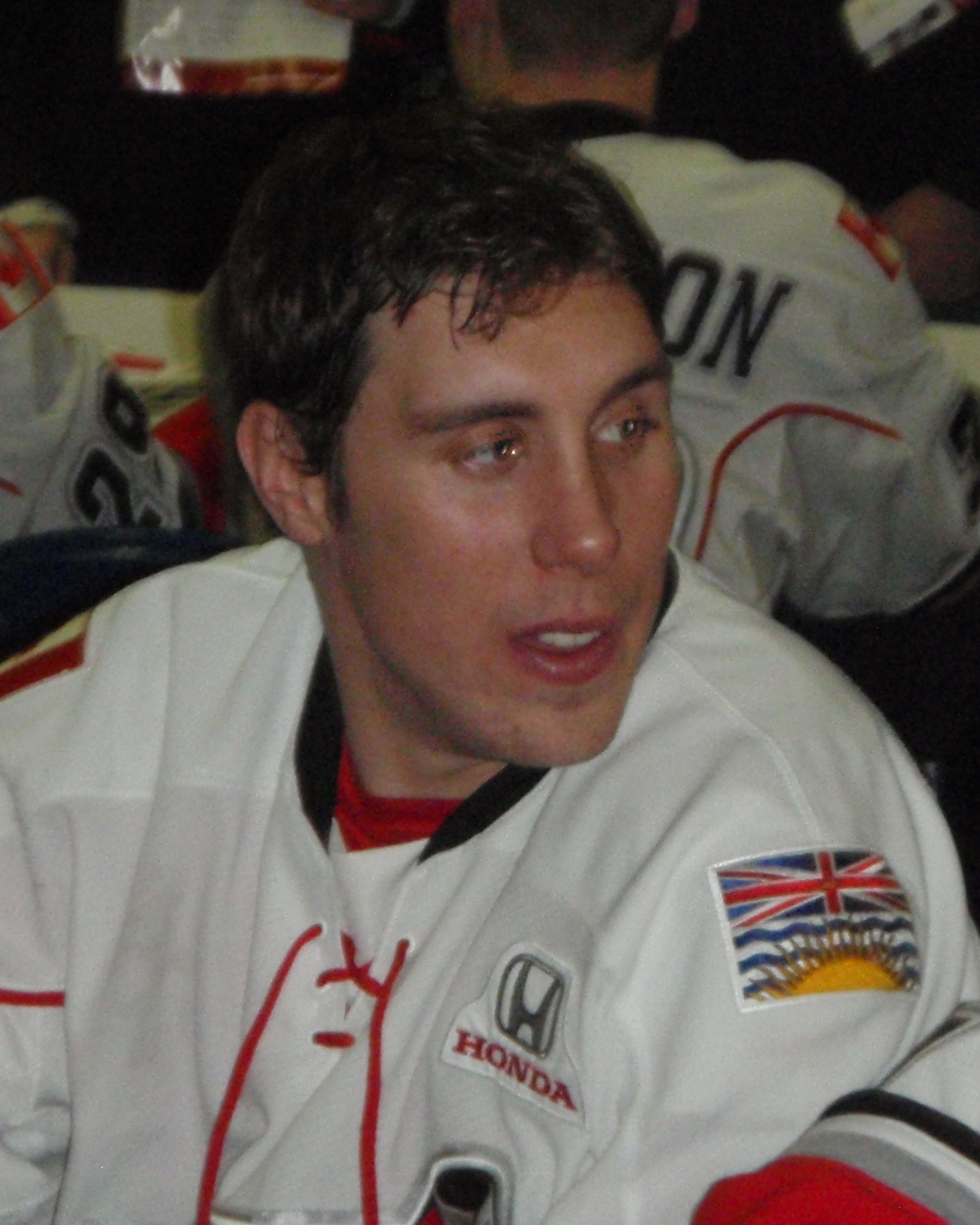
- Born: 4 June 1985 (age 40) Powell River, British Columbia, Canada
- Height: 6 ft 1 in (185 cm)
- Weight: 213 lb (97 kg; 15 st 3 lb)
- Position: Left wing
- Shot: Left
- Played for: Omaha Ak-Sar-Ben Knights; Quad City Flames; Abbotsford Heat
- NHL draft: 240th overall, 2003; Calgary Flames
- Playing career: 2005–2011

Cam Cunning (born 4 June 1985) is a Canadian former professional ice hockey player. He was drafted by the Calgary Flames in the 8th round of the 2003 NHL entry draft with the 240th pick.

== Playing career ==
Born in Powell River, British Columbia, Cunning played junior hockey with the Kamloops Blazers of the Western Hockey League (WHL). After his first season, he was drafted by the Calgary Flames. He continued his junior career until 2005 when he turned professional with the Omaha Ak-Sar-Ben Knights of the American Hockey League (AHL), Calgary's affiliate. Cunning would continue in the Flames' system for several seasons, but was not called up to Calgary. His final season was 2010–11 with the Abbotsford Heat after which he became a free agent.

== Career statistics ==
			Regular season					Playoffs
Season	Team	League	GP	G	A	Pts	PIM	GP	G	A	Pts	PIM
2001–02	Powell River Kings	BCHL	52	6	6	12	54	—	—	—	—	—
2002–03	Kamloops Blazers	WHL	71	7	13	20	54	6	1	0	1	2
2003–04	Kamloops Blazers	WHL	65	14	13	27	162	5	1	1	2	10
2004–05	Kamloops Blazers	WHL	39	14	8	22	63	—	—	—	—	—
2004–05	Vancouver Giants	WHL	30	3	7	10	19	6	1	3	4	14
2005–06	Omaha Ak–Sar–Ben Knights	AHL	30	2	4	6	24	—	—	—	—	—
2005–06	Red Deer Rebels	WHL	40	19	13	32	52	—	—	—	—	—
2006–07	Omaha Ak–Sar–Ben Knights	AHL	60	12	5	17	45	6	0	2	2	2
2007–08	Quad City Flames	AHL	68	11	4	15	80	—	—	—	—	—
2008–09	Quad City Flames	AHL	63	7	14	21	38	—	—	—	—	—
2009–10	Abbotsford Heat	AHL	69	19	19	38	64	13	1	2	3	6
2010–11	Abbotsford Heat	AHL	52	14	8	22	46	—	—	—	—	—
AHL totals			342	65	54	119	297	19	1	4	5	8
