= Benoît Quessandier =

French ice hockey player

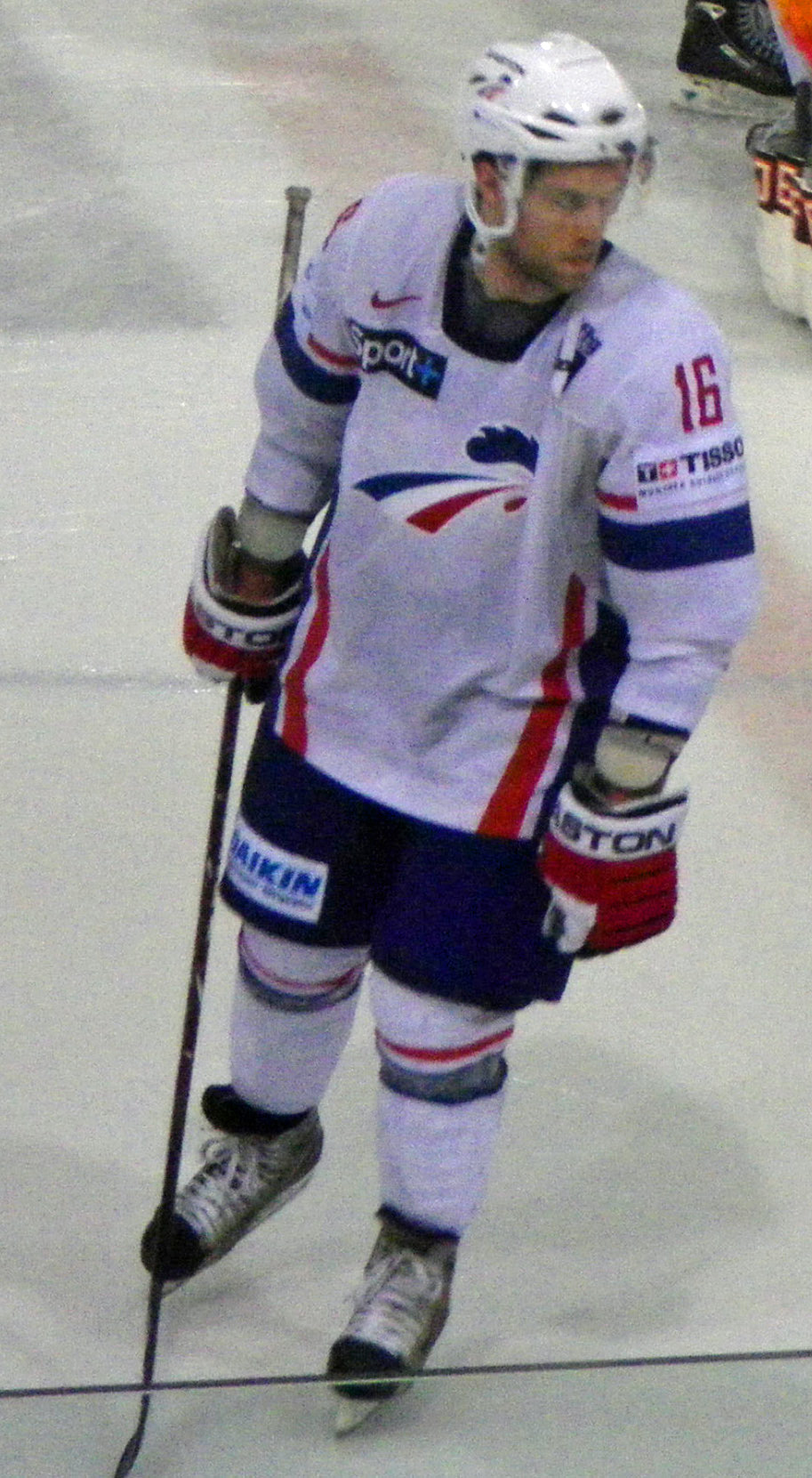
- Born: December 2, 1985 (age 40) Mont-Saint-Aignan
- Height: 6 ft 0 in (183 cm)
- Weight: 201 lb (91 kg; 14 st 5 lb)
- Position: Defence
- Shot: Left
- Played for: Dragons de Rouen; Docks du Havre; Williams Lake TimberWolves; Merritt Centennials; Southern Minnesota Express; Gamyo d'Épinal; Ducs de Dijon; Scorpions de Mulhouse
- National team: France
- Playing career: 2002–2018

Benoît Quessandier (born 2 December 1985, in Mont-Saint-Aignan) is a professional French ice hockey defenceman who participated at the 2010 IIHF World Championship as a member of the France National men's ice hockey team.

== Career statistics ==
			Regular season					Playoffs
Season	Team	League	GP	G	A	Pts	PIM	GP	G	A	Pts	PIM
2002–03	Dragons de Rouen	France	11	0	0	0	0	—	—	—	—	—
2003–04	Dragons de Rouen U22	France U22	13	2	9	11	14	2	2	0	2	2
2003–04	Docks du Havre	France3	4	3	0	3	36	—	—	—	—	—
2003–04	Dragons de Rouen	France	16	0	0	0	8	3	0	0	0	2
2004–05	Dragons de Rouen U22	France U22	8	6	7	13	26	—	—	—	—	—
2004–05	Dragons de Rouen	Ligue Magnus	27	0	1	1	65	12	0	1	1	12
2005–06	Williams Lake TimberWolves	BCHL	17	1	3	4	33	—	—	—	—	—
2005–06	Merritt Centennials	BCHL	1	1	0	1	2	—	—	—	—	—
2005–06	Southern Minnesota Express	NAHL	23	4	6	10	22	12	0	7	7	10
2006–07	Dragons de Rouen	Ligue Magnus	13	2	3	5	44	8	0	3	3	18
2007–08	Dragons de Rouen	Ligue Magnus	23	0	6	6	65	3	0	0	0	0
2008–09	Gamyo d'Épinal	Ligue Magnus	21	4	1	5	54	6	0	1	1	22
2009–10	Gamyo d'Épinal	Ligue Magnus	21	0	7	7	114	2	0	0	0	4
2010–11	Gamyo d'Épinal	Ligue Magnus	10	0	3	3	16	—	—	—	—	—
2011–12	Ducs de Dijon	Ligue Magnus	23	1	6	7	42	5	0	0	0	0
2012–13	Ducs de Dijon	Ligue Magnus	19	1	4	5	6	5	0	1	1	2
2013–14	Ducs de Dijon	Ligue Magnus	13	1	1	2	10	8	0	1	1	8
2014–15	Ducs de Dijon	Ligue Magnus	10	0	4	4	6	13	0	3	3	8
2015–16	Ducs de Dijon	Ligue Magnus	23	0	7	7	38	—	—	—	—	—
2016–17	Ducs de Dijon	Ligue Magnus	37	1	4	5	72	—	—	—	—	—
2017–18	Scorpions de Mulhouse	Ligue Magnus	43	2	9	11	44	—	—	—	—	—
Ligue Magnus totals			310	12	56	68	584	65	0	10	10	76
