= Ján Plch =

Slovak professional ice hockey player (born 1974)

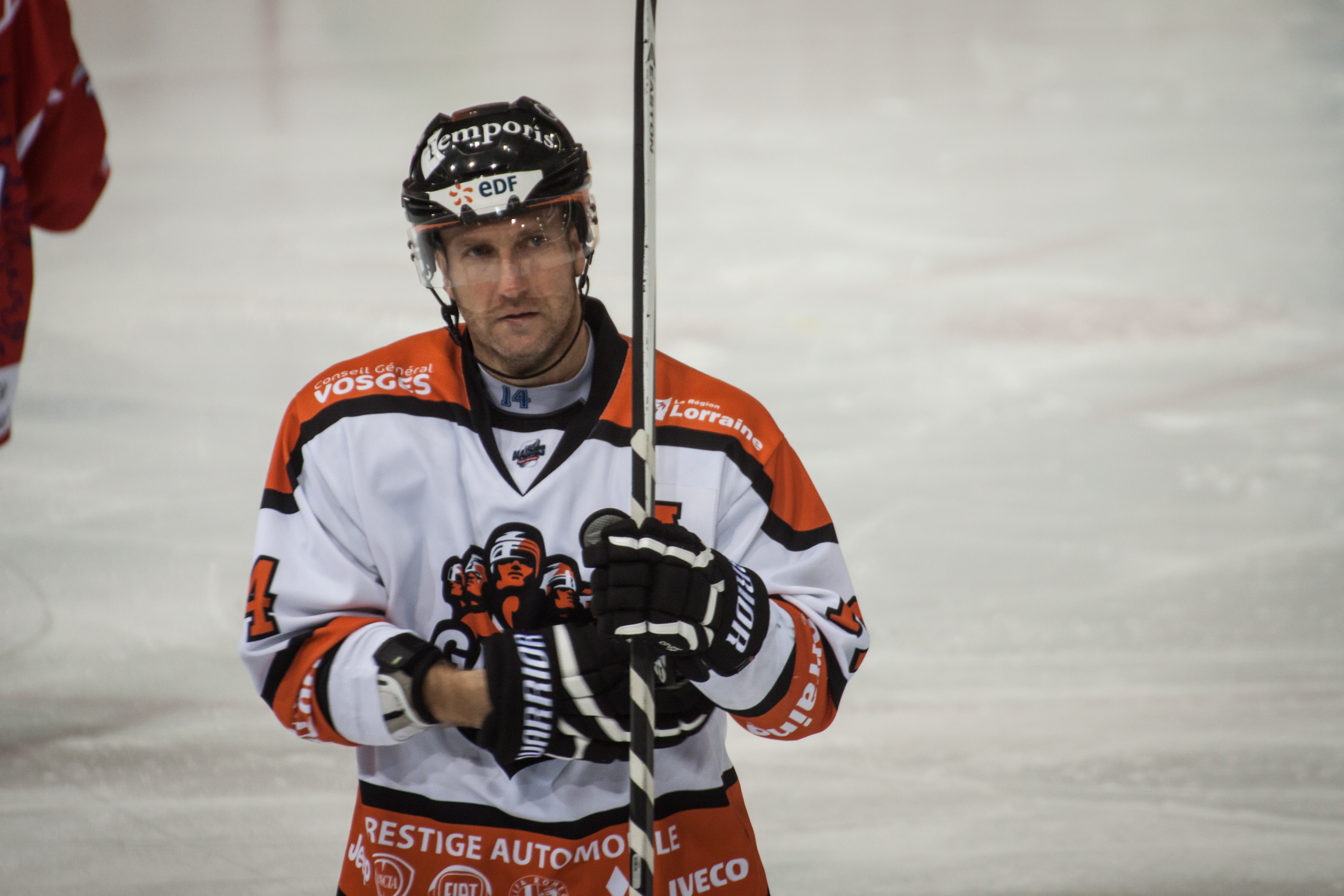
- Ján Plch, was a Slovak professional ice hockey player.
- Born: August 16, 1974 (age 51) Liptovský Mikuláš, Czechoslovakia
- Height: 5 ft 10 in (178 cm)
- Weight: 176 lb (80 kg; 12 st 8 lb)
- Position: Right wing
- Shoots: Left
- FRA-2 team Former teams: Gamyo d'Épinal II; MHk 32 Liptovský Mikuláš; HC Košice; HK Poprad; HKm Zvolen; Orli Znojmo; MsHK Žilina; HC Slovan Bratislava; Gamyo d'Épinal
- National team: Slovakia
- Playing career: 1992–present

Ján Plch (born 16 August 1974) is a Slovak professional ice hockey player.

He played with HC Slovan Bratislava in the Slovak Extraliga.

== Career statistics ==
=== Regular season and playoffs ===
			Regular season					Playoffs
Season	Team	League	GP	G	A	Pts	PIM	GP	G	A	Pts	PIM
1992–93	HK 32 Liptovský Mikuláš	SVK II	—	—	—	—	—	—	—	—	—	—
1993–94	HK 32 Liptovský Mikuláš	SVK	27	6	4	10	—	—	—	—	—	—
1994–95	HK 32 Liptovský Mikuláš	SVK	35	17	4	21	8	3	0	2	2	0
1995–96	HK 32 Liptovský Mikuláš	SVK	37	17	12	29	24	—	—	—	—	—
1996–97	HK 32 Liptovský Mikuláš	SVK	46	16	26	42	24	—	—	—	—	—
1997–98	HC Košice	SVK	47	13	26	39	10	—	—	—	—	—
1998–99	HK 32 Liptovský Mikuláš	SVK	45	28	22	50	60	—	—	—	—	—
1999–2000	HC ŠKP Poprad	SVK	56	24	31	55	36	6	1	2	3	6
2000–01	HKm Zvolen	SVK	53	25	44	69	38	10	5	5	10	4
2001–02	HC JME Znojemští Orli	ELH	44	11	12	23	43	7	2	3	5	0
2002–03	HC JME Znojemští Orli	ELH	39	7	9	16	10	—	—	—	—	—
2003–04	MsHK Žilina	SVK	28	12	5	17	12	—	—	—	—	—
2003–04	HK 32 Liptovský Mikuláš	SVK	10	8	6	14	6	—	—	—	—	—
2003–04	HC Slovan Bratislava	SVK	8	1	3	4	2	12	0	1	1	6
2004–05	HK 32 Liptovský Mikuláš	SVK	54	11	30	41	74	5	1	2	3	4
2005–06	Dauphins d'Épinal	FRA	26	13	9	22	22	5	2	4	6	6
2006–07	Dauphins d'Épinal	FRA	26	26	24	50	26	2	1	1	2	4
2007–08	Dauphins d'Épinal	FRA	20	5	30	35	22	2	1	3	4	2
2008–09	Dauphins d'Épinal	FRA	26	17	35	52	18	6	7	1	8	4
2009–10	Dauphins d'Épinal	FRA	26	18	18	36	12	2	0	1	1	32
2010–11	Dauphins d'Épinal	FRA	26	13	34	47	18	3	0	2	2	2
2011–12	Dauphins d'Épinal	FRA	26	12	27	39	8	5	3	3	6	2
2012–13	Dauphins d'Épinal	FRA	26	14	17	31	6	14	4	14	18	4
2013–14	Dauphins d'Épinal	FRA	26	21	26	47	14	3	2	2	4	0
2014–15	Dauphins d'Épinal	FRA	25	14	13	27	4	23	4	16	20	2
2015–16	Dauphins d'Épinal	FRA	26	8	16	24	2	12	4	7	11	2
2016–17	Dauphins d'Épinal II	FRA II	8	10	13	23	0	7	11	16	27	14
2017–18	Dauphins d'Épinal II	FRA II	12	16	32	48	2	—	—	—	—	—
SVK totals			446	172	219	391	294	36	7	12	19	20
FRA totals			279	161	249	410	152	77	28	54	82	60

=== International ===
Year	Team	Event	GP	G	A	Pts	PIM
1994	Slovakia	WJC-C	4	4	6	10	4
