= Ilpo Salmivirta =

Finnish ice hockey player

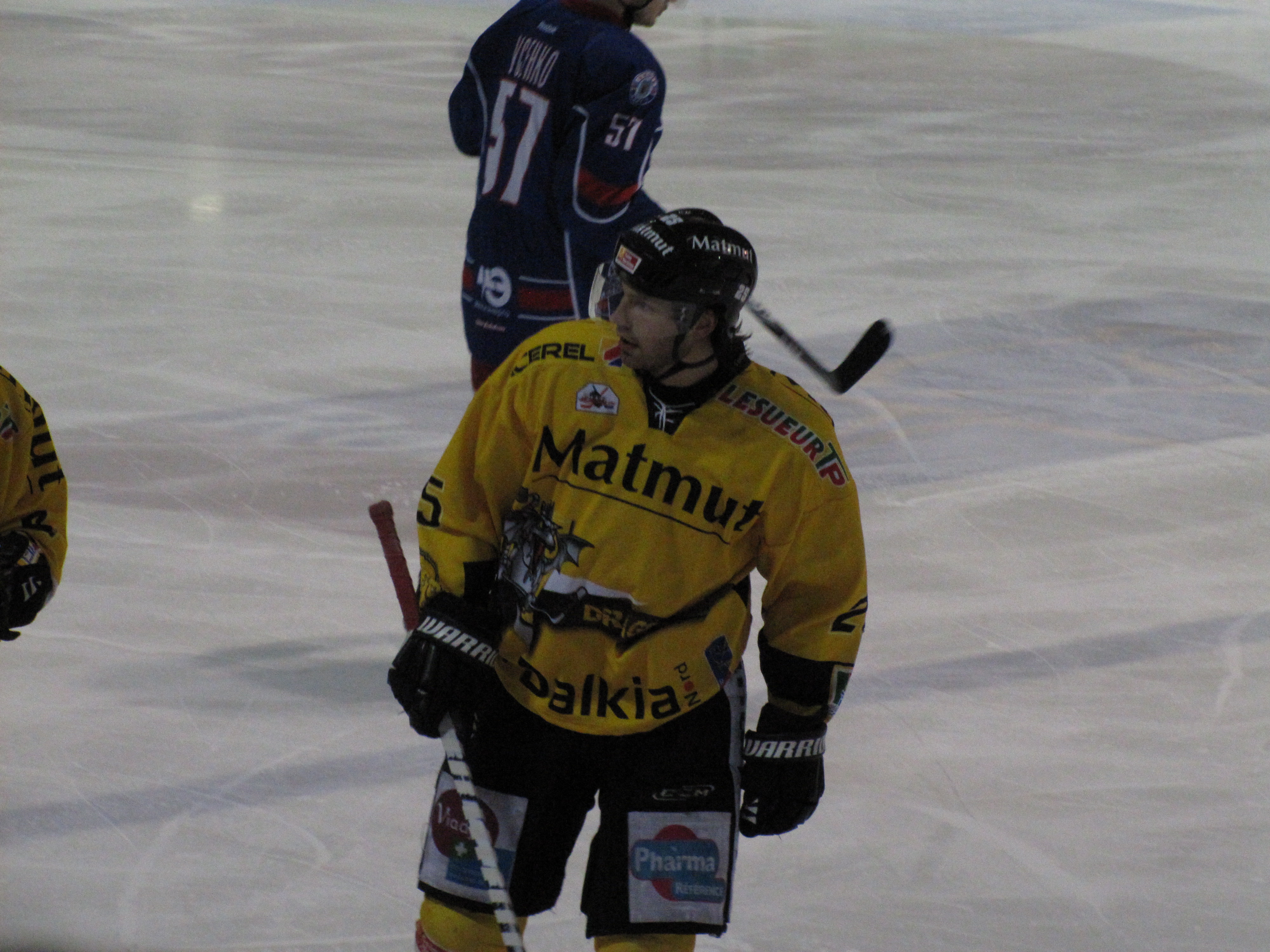
- Ilpo Salmivirta Portrait
- Born: October 17, 1983 (age 42) Mänttä, Finland
- Height: 6 ft 2 in (188 cm)
- Weight: 196 lb (89 kg; 14 st 0 lb)
- Position: Left wing
- Shot: Left
- Played for: Tappara; Dauphins d'Épinal; Dragons de Rouen; Sheffield Steelers; Gothiques d'Amiens; Ducs de Dijon; Chamonix HC; Boxers de Bordeaux
- Playing career: 2004–2017

Ilpo Salmivirta (born October 17, 1983) is a Finnish former ice hockey left winger.

Salmivirta played 31 games in the SM-liiga for Tappara between 2004 and 2006 and scored zero points. He also played in the French Ligue Magnus between 2007 and 2017, playing for Dauphins d'Épinal, Dragons de Rouen, Gothiques d'Amiens, Ducs de Dijon, Chamonix HC and Boxers de Bordeaux. He also had a month-loan trial with the Sheffield Steelers of the Elite Ice Hockey League in September 2013, playing five league games and three cup games before returning to France.

== Career statistics ==
			Regular season					Playoffs
Season	Team	League	GP	G	A	Pts	PIM	GP	G	A	Pts	PIM
1999–00	Tappara U18	U18 SM-sarja	32	2	1	3	6	—	—	—	—	—
2000–01	Tappara U18	U18 SM-sarja	35	5	16	21	24	—	—	—	—	—
2000–01	Tappara U20	U20 SM-liiga	3	0	0	0	2	—	—	—	—	—
2001–02	Tappara U20	U20 SM-liiga	42	7	4	11	10	2	0	1	1	0
2002–03	Tappara U20	U20 SM-liiga	27	1	4	5	16	5	0	0	0	4
2003–04	Tappara U20	U20 SM-liiga	40	15	17	32	47	14	6	5	11	12
2004–05	Tappara	SM-liiga	13	0	0	0	0	—	—	—	—	—
2004–05	Kiekko-Vantaa	Mestis	7	0	0	0	6	—	—	—	—	—
2004–05	FPS	Mestis	1	0	0	0	2	—	—	—	—	—
2004–05	HC Salamat	Mestis	18	11	8	19	10	3	1	0	1	0
2005–06	Tappara	SM-liiga	18	0	0	0	4	—	—	—	—	—
2005–06	KooKoo	Mestis	7	1	3	4	6	—	—	—	—	—
2005–06	Jukurit	Mestis	9	5	1	6	6	11	3	1	4	8
2006–07	Vaasan Sport	Mestis	45	12	19	31	63	7	1	0	1	6
2007–08	Dauphins d'Épinal	Ligue Magnus	26	16	8	24	26	2	1	0	1	2
2008–09	Dauphins d'Épinal	Ligue Magnus	18	18	12	30	6	6	3	4	7	4
2009–10	Dragons de Rouen	Ligue Magnus	26	15	15	30	14	11	8	7	15	6
2010–11	Dragons de Rouen	Ligue Magnus	25	14	20	34	20	9	2	4	6	4
2011–12	Dragons de Rouen	Ligue Magnus	25	10	7	17	4	15	5	7	12	6
2012–13	Dragons de Rouen	Ligue Magnus	23	9	9	18	12	13	4	1	5	18
2013–14	Sheffield Steelers	EIHL	5	0	3	3	4	—	—	—	—	—
2013–14	Gothiques d'Amiens	Ligue Magnus	18	8	11	19	24	5	5	2	7	4
2014–15	Ducs de Dijon	Ligue Magnus	26	7	16	23	26	13	6	3	9	8
2015–16	Pionniers de Chamonix Mont-Blanc	Ligue Magnus	26	8	7	15	18	—	—	—	—	—
2016–17	Boxers de Bordeaux	Ligue Magnus	36	8	11	19	26	11	2	1	3	8
Mestis totals			87	29	31	60	93	21	5	1	6	14
Ligue Magnus totals			249	113	116	229	176	91	40	31	71	64
