= Grégory Beron =

French ice hockey player (born 1989)

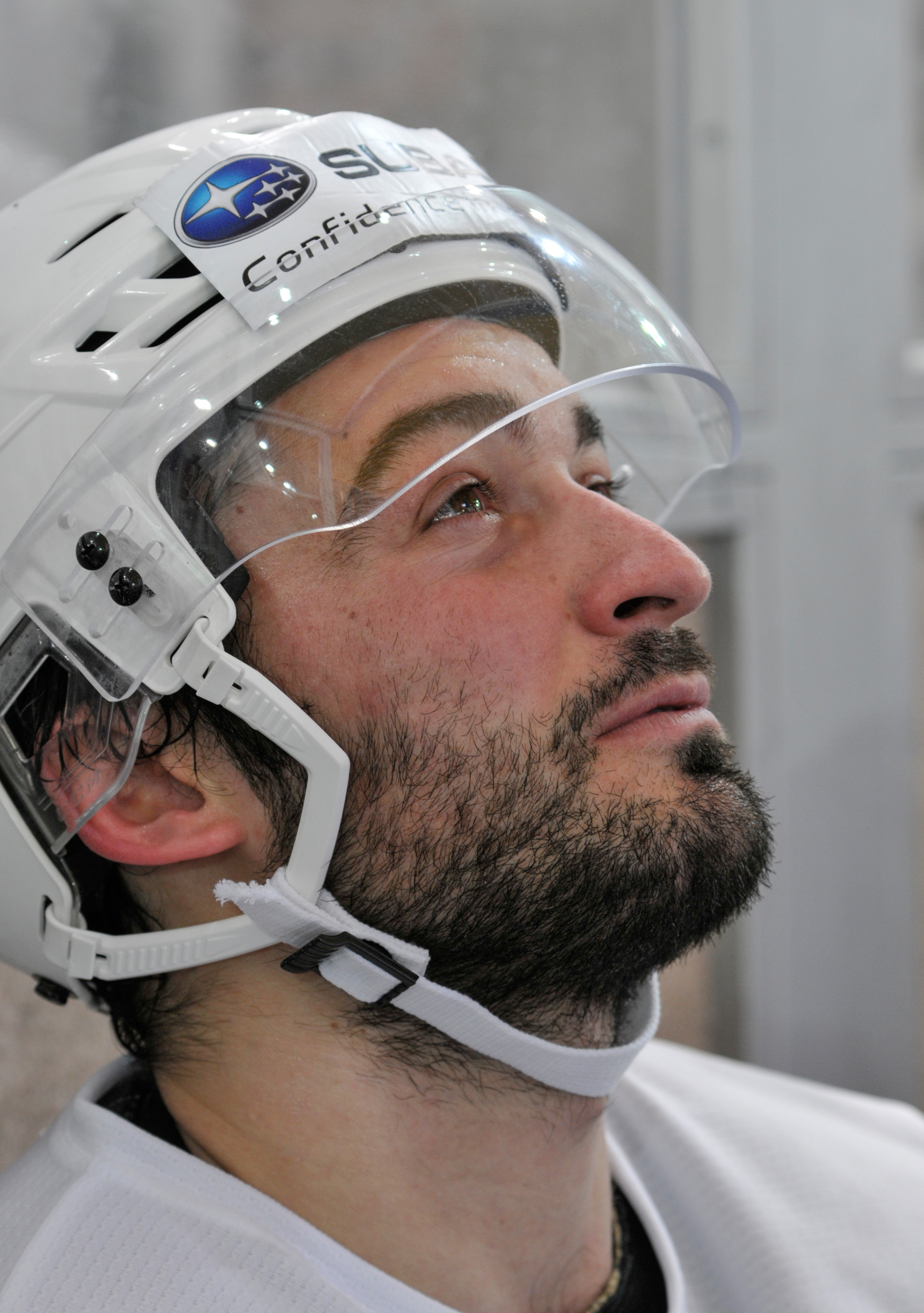
- Grégory Beron (2013)
- Born: 31 July 1989 (age 36) Amiens, France
- Height: 5 ft 11 in (180 cm)
- Weight: 192 lb (87 kg; 13 st 10 lb)
- Position: Defenceman
- Shot: Right
- Played for: Amiens; Morzine-Avoriaz; Épinal
- National team: France
- Playing career: 2007–2018

Grégory Beron (born 31 July 1989) is a French former ice hockey defenceman who played for Corsaires de Dunkerque of the FFHG Division 1.

== Career statistics ==
=== Regular season and playoffs ===
			Regular season					Playoffs
Season	Team	League	GP	G	A	Pts	PIM	GP	G	A	Pts	PIM
2005–06	Amiens U18	France U18	9	5	7	12	22	—	—	—	—	—
2005–06	Amiens U22	France U22	1	0	0	0	0	—	—	—	—	—
2006–07	Amiens U18	France U18	14	16	5	21	18	1	1	1	2	0
2006–07	Amiens U22	France U22	8	2	1	3	10	—	—	—	—	—
2007–08	Amiens U22	France U22	8	3	1	4	6	—	—	—	—	—
2007–08	Amiens	Ligue Magnus	20	4	3	7	4	3	0	0	0	2
2008–09	Amiens U22	France U22	7	9	6	15	2	—	—	—	—	—
2008–09	Amiens	Ligue Magnus	24	2	8	10	16	8	1	0	1	2
2009–10	Amiens U22	France U22	12	15	17	32	18	3	2	5	7	8
2009–10	Amiens	Ligue Magnus	19	9	16	25	18	4	0	3	3	2
2010–11	Amiens U22	France U22	6	6	4	10	12	2	1	2	3	0
2010–11	Amiens	Ligue Magnus	23	10	13	23	14	9	3	2	5	16
2011–12	Amiens	Ligue Magnus	26	6	13	19	20	10	0	1	1	4
2012–13	Amiens	Ligue Magnus	22	8	7	15	16	5	3	1	4	2
2013–14	Morzine-Avoriaz	Ligue Magnus	26	16	22	38	20	9	4	4	8	12
2014–15	Épinal	Ligue Magnus	25	5	3	8	14	23	8	11	19	6
2015–16	Amiens	Ligue Magnus	26	4	9	13	30	5	0	2	2	16
2016–17	Amiens	Ligue Magnus	41	7	22	29	36	5	0	3	3	2
2017–18	Dunkerque	France2	1	0	0	0	4	—	—	—	—	—
Ligue Magnus totals			252	71	116	187	188	81	19	27	46	64

=== International ===
Year	Team	Event	GP	G	A	Pts	PIM
2007	France U18	WJC-18 (D1)	5	0	0	0	4
2008	France U20	WJC-20 (D1)	5	1	2	3	14
2009	France U20	WJC-20 (D1)	5	0	1	1	6
2016	France	WC	7	0	2	2	0
2016	France	OGQ	3	0	0	0	0
Junior totals			15	1	3	4	24
Senior totals			10	0	2	2	0
