= Jani (given name) =

Jani is a given name, particularly common for men in Finland and Hungary. It is derived from the Hebrew Yohanan and is hence a cognate of the English John. However, the given name is used in other cultures including for women, and may have different pronunciations.

People with given name include:

- Jani Allan, South African columnist and broadcaster
- Jani Beg, Khan of the Golden Horde
- Jani Christou, Greek composer
- Jani Hurme, Finnish ice hockey goaltender
- Jani Kautto, Finnish ice hockey player
- Jani Lajunen, Finnish ice hockey player
- Jani Lane, American rock singer
- Jani Liimatainen, Finnish musician
- Jani Lyyski, Finnish football player
- Jani Radebaugh, American scientist
- Jani Rita, Finnish ice hockey player
- Jani Sievinen, Finnish swimmer
- Jani Soininen, Finnish ski jumper
- Jani Stefanovic, Swedish musician
- Jani Sullanmaa, Finnish curler
- Jani Virtanen (disambiguation)
- Jani Vreto, Albanian writer

== See also ==
- The dictionary definition of Jani at Wiktionary
- Alternate forms for the name John
