= Marcinko =

Marcinko is a surname. In Slovak, Marcinková is the corresponding surname for women.

It is most common in the US where approximately 1 in 270,000 people have the surname. Notable people with the surname include:

- Gabriela Marcinková (born 1988), Slovak actress
- Miroslav Marcinko (born 1964), Slovak ice hockey player
- Nadia Marcinko (born 1986), U.S. Gulfstream commercial pilot, also known as Nada Marcinkova
- Petra Marčinko (born 2005), Croatian tennis player
- Richard Marcinko (1940–2021), United States Navy officer
- Tomáš Marcinko (born 1988), Slovak ice hockey player
- Vladimíra Marcinková (born 1991), Slovak politician
