= 2016 IIHF World Championship Group B =

Group B was one of two groups of the 2016 IIHF World Championship. The four best placed teams advanced to the playoff round, while the last placed team was relegated to Division I in 2017.

== Standings ==
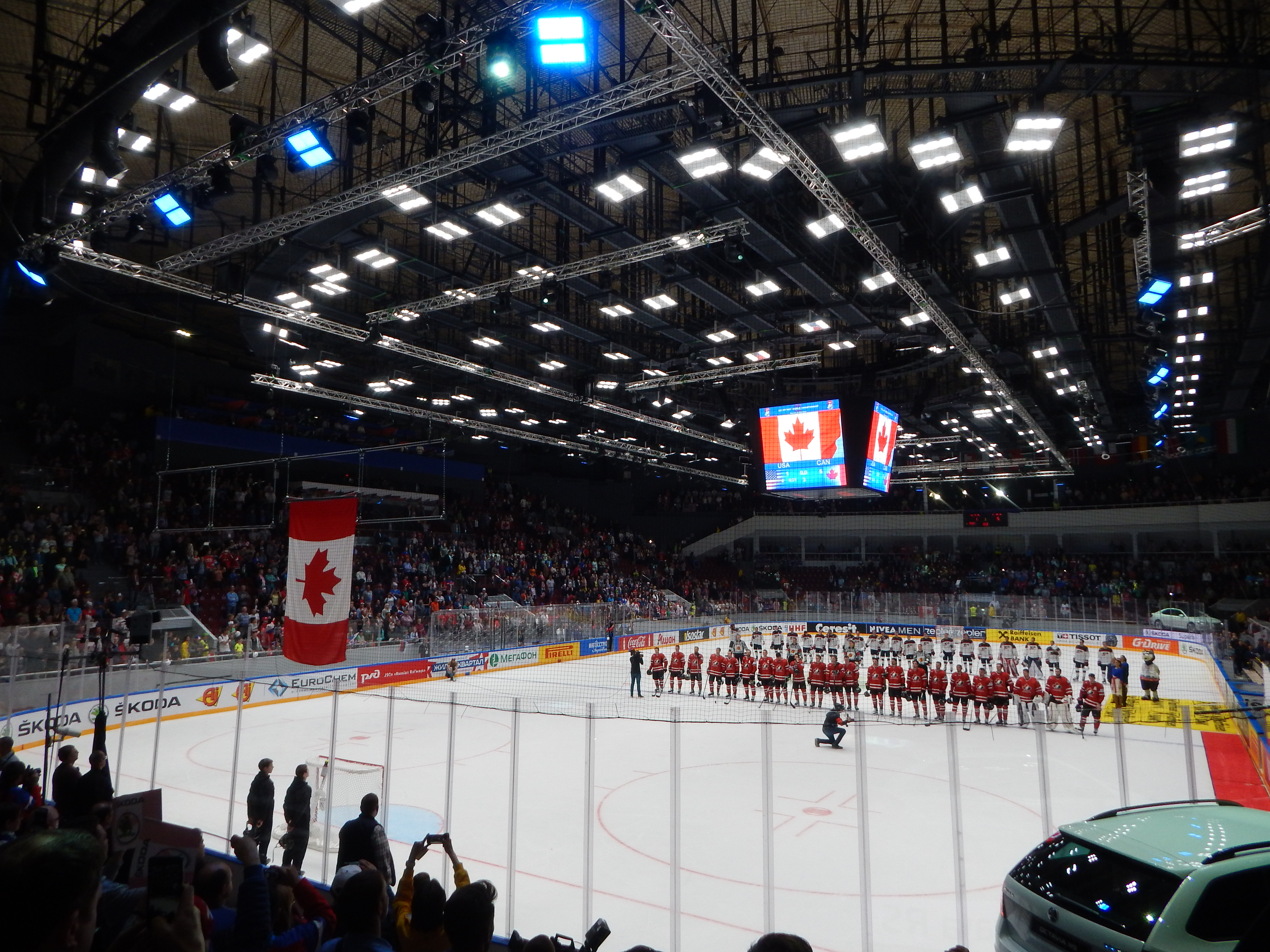
Team Canada wins the first match in Saint Petersburg against the United States

Pos	Team	Pld	W	OTW	OTL	L	GF	GA	GD	Pts	Qualification or relegation
1	Finland	7	7	0	0	0	29	6	+23	21	Playoff round
2	Canada	7	6	0	0	1	34	8	+26	18	Playoff round
3	Germany	7	4	0	1	2	22	20	+2	13	Playoff round
4	United States	7	3	0	1	3	22	18	+4	10	Playoff round
5	Slovakia	7	2	1	0	4	15	23	−8	8	
6	Belarus	7	2	0	0	5	16	32	−16	6	
7	France	7	1	1	0	5	11	23	−12	5	
8	Hungary (R)	7	1	0	0	6	12	31	−19	3	Relegation to Division I A (Note: The rules state that "the bottom ranked two teams will be relegated" and the 2017 hosts (France and Germany) cannot be relegated by rule.)

Source: IIHF
Rules for classification: 1) points; 2) head-to-head points; 3) head-to-head goal difference; 4) head-to-head number of goals scored; 5) result against closest best-ranked team outside tied teams; 6) result against second-best ranked team outside tied teams; 7) seeding before tournament.
(R) Relegated
Notes:

All times are local (UTC+3).

== Matches ==
=== United States vs Canada ===
6 May 2016; 16:15	United States	1–5 (1–2, 0–1, 0–2)	Canada	Yubileyny Sports Palace, Saint Petersburg; Attendance: 5,236

Game reference

Keith Kinkaid
Goalies
Cam Talbot
Referees:
(Sweden) Tobias Björk
(Switzerland) Marc Wiegand
Linesmen:
(Russia) Gleb Lazarev
(Czech Republic) Miroslav Lhotský

Maroon (Connor, Warsofsky) (PP) – 04:54	1–0
	1–1	05:25 – Hall (Brassard, Perry)
	1–2	08:48 – Gallagher (O'Reilly)
	1–3	31:37 – Duchene (Ceci, Murray)
	1–4	45:54 – Jenner (O'Reilly)
	1–5	51:16 – Marchand (Duchene) (SH)

10 min
Penalties
6 min
25
Shots
33

=== Finland vs Belarus ===
6 May 2016; 20:15	Finland	6–2 (0–0, 4–1, 2–1)	Belarus	Yubileyny Sports Palace, Saint Petersburg; Attendance: 4,877

Game reference

Mikko Koskinen
Goalies
Vitali Koval
Referees:
(Czech Republic) Martin Fraňo
(Hungary) Péter Gebei
Linesmen:
(Switzerland) Nicolas Fluri
(Sweden) Andreas Malmqvist

Laine (Barkov) – 21:45	1–0
Koivu (Granlund, Lindell) – 32:28	2–0
	2–1	37:55 – Stas (Pavlovich) (SH)
Laine (Koivu, Jokinen) (PP2) – 38:36	3–1
Granlund (Laine, Barkov) (PP) – 39:56	4–1
Pihlström (Pulkkinen) – 42:59	5–1
Granlund (Salmela, Aho) – 47:51	6–1
	6–2	51:01 – Kalyuzhny (A. Kostitsyn, S. Kostitsyn)

8 min
Penalties
8 min
30
Shots
16

=== Slovakia vs Hungary ===
7 May 2016; 12:15	Slovakia	4–1 (2–1, 1–0, 1–0)	Hungary	Yubileyny Sports Palace, Saint Petersburg; Attendance: 2,830

Game reference

Branislav Konrád
Goalies
Miklós Rajna
Referees:
(United States) Timothy Mayer
(Switzerland) Marc Wiegand
Linesmen:
(Switzerland) Roman Kaderli
(United States) Judson Ritter

Marcinko (Graňák, Dravecký) – 07:07	1–0
	1–1	13:30 – Banham (Galló, Bartalis) (PP)
Jurčo (Sekera, Marinčin) – 17:43	2–1
Sekera (Jurčo, Marinčin) – 35:09	3–1
Lušňák (Hrnka, Švarný) (ENG) – 57:43	4–1

10 min
Penalties
6 min
28
Shots
21

=== France vs Germany ===
7 May 2016; 16:15	France	3–2 GWS (1–0, 1–2, 0–0); OT (0–0); GWS (1–0)	Germany	Yubileyny Sports Palace, Saint Petersburg; Attendance: 3,750

Game reference

Cristobal Huet
Goalies
Timo Pielmeier
Referees:
(Czech Republic) Martin Frano
(Czech Republic) Antonin Jerabek
Linesmen:
(Norway) Jon Kilian
(Finland) Sakari Suominen

Raux (Perret, Meunier) – 03:38	1–0
	1–1	20:26 – Rieder (Gogulla, Schütz) (PP)
	1–2	36:50 – Schütz (Gogulla, Hager)
Claireaux (Beron, Chakiachvili) – 39:10	2–2

Desrosiers (miss)
Fleury
Shootout
(miss) Draisaitl
(miss) Rieder
(miss) Goc
14 min
Penalties
8 min
23
Shots
29

=== Belarus vs United States ===
7 May 2016; 20:15	Belarus	3–6 (0–2, 2–3, 1–1)	United States	Yubileyny Sports Palace, Saint Petersburg; Attendance: 3,762

Game reference

Kevin Lalande
Goalies
Mike Condon
Referees:
(Sweden) Linus Ohlund
(Russia) Konstantin Olenin
Linesmen:
(Switzerland) Nicolas Fluri
(Czech Republic) Miroslav Lhotsky

	0–1	09:58 – Wood (Vatrano, Hinostroza)
	0–2	13:38 – Wideman (Matthews, Larkin) (PP)
	0–3	22:13 – Larkin (Schroeder) (PP)
Platt (Stepanov, Linglet) (PP) – 27:10	1–3
	1–4	28:09 – Hanifin (Hinostroza, Motte)
	1–5	34:25 – Matthews (Connor, Hanifin) (PP)
Stas – 38:12	2–5
Korobov (Kostitsyn, Stepanov) (PP2) – 49:28	3–5
	3–6	54:40 – Matthews (Vatrano, Hanifin)

41 min
Penalties
18 min
23
Shots
33

=== Hungary vs Canada ===
8 May 2016; 12:15	Hungary	1–7 (1–2, 0–4, 0–1)	Canada	Yubileyny Sports Palace, Saint Petersburg; Attendance: 3,825

Game reference

Zoltán Hetényi
Ádám Vay
Goalies
Calvin Pickard
Referees:
(Czech Republic) Antonín Jeřábek
(Sweden) Linus Ohlund
Linesmen:
(Sweden) Andreas Malmqvist
(Finland) Sakari Suominen

	0–1	05:54 – Scheifele (Stone, McDavid) (PP)
	0–2	10:04 – Perry (Hall, Brassard)
Bartalis – 18:14	1–2
	1–3	27:12 – Stone (Ceci, Reinhart)
	1–4	29:05 – Marchand (McDavid, Matheson)
	1–5	31:36 – Brassard (Tanev, Rielly)
	1–6	32:45 – Matheson (Hutton, Scheifele)
	1–7	44:35 – Hall (Matheson)

12 min
Penalties
6 min
22
Shots
36

=== Finland vs Germany ===
8 May 2016; 16:15	Finland	5–1 (2–0, 2–1, 1–0)	Germany	Yubileyny Sports Palace, Saint Petersburg; Attendance: 4,409

Game reference

Mikko Koskinen
Goalies
Timo Pielmeier
Referees:
(United States) Timothy Mayer
(Russia) Konstantin Olenin
Linesmen:
(Switzerland) Roman Kaderli
(Norway) Jon Killian

Laine (Hietanen, Jokinen) (PP) – 06:22	1–0
Komarov (Jokinen, Laine) (PP) – 09:08	2–0
Aho (Granlund) – 29:53	3–0
Koskiranta (Pyörälä, Komarov) – 37:50	4–0
	4–1	38:42 – Macek (Draisaitl, Kahun) (PP)
Laine (Koivu, Granlund) – 59:57	5–1

12 min
Penalties
28 min
22
Shots
17

=== France vs Slovakia ===
8 May 2016; 20:15	France	1–5 (1–2, 0–2, 0–1)	Slovakia	Yubileyny Sports Palace, Saint Petersburg; Attendance: 3,850

Game reference

Cristobal Huet
Florian Hardy
Goalies
Július Hudáček
Referees:
(Sweden) Tobias Björk
(Hungary) Péter Gebei
Linesmen:
(Russia) Gleb Lazarev
(United States) Judson Ritter

Perret (Beron) – 01:09	1–0
	1–1	03:55 – Sekera (L. Hudáček, Viedenský)
	1–2	13:55 – Graňák (Dravecký, Lušňák)
	1–3	34:52 – Bakoš (Meszároš, Sersen) (PP)
	1–4	35:40 – L. Hudáček (Jurčo, Viedenský)
	1–5	57:55 – Jaroš (Viedenský, Jurčo)

10 min
Penalties
10 min
25
Shots
22

=== Belarus vs Canada ===
9 May 2016; 16:15	Belarus	0–8 (0–1, 0–4, 0–3)	Canada	Yubileyny Sports Palace, Saint Petersburg; Attendance: 4,536

Game reference

Kevin Lalande
Dmitri Milchakov
Goalies
Cam Talbot
Referees:
(Hungary) Péter Gebei
(Switzerland) Marc Wiegand
Linesmen:
(Switzerland) Nicolas Fluri
(Czech Republic) Miroslav Lhotský

0–1	16:26 – Brassard (Perry, Duchene)
0–2	21:03 – Perry (Murray)
0–3	23:58 – O'Reilly (Jenner, Ceci) (SH)
0–4	31:19 – Duchene (Brassard, Ceci) (PP)
0–5	31:39 – Hall (McDavid)
0–6	41:26 – O'Reilly (Duchene, Scheifele)
0–7	49:17 – Stone (Scheifele)
0–8	53:52 – Matheson (Gallagher, McDavid) (PP)

10 min
Penalties
6 min
13
Shots
40

=== Finland vs United States ===
9 May 2016; 20:15	Finland	3–2 (2–1, 0–0, 1–1)	United States	Yubileyny Sports Palace, Saint Petersburg; Attendance: 4,830

Game reference

Mikko Koskinen
Goalies
Mike Condon
Referees:
(Sweden) Tobias Björk
(Czech Republic) Martin Fraňo
Linesmen:
(Russia) Gleb Lazarev
(Sweden) Andreas Malmqvist

Koivu (Granlund, Aho) – 09:16	1–0
Pihlström (Pulkkinen, Sallinen) – 12:04	2–0
	2–1	13:45 – Vatrano (Matthews)
	2–2	40:54 – Murphy (Maroon, Larkin)
Komarov (Barkov, Jokinen) (PP) – 44:16	3–2

6 min
Penalties
8 min
22
Shots
18

=== Slovakia vs Germany ===
10 May 2016; 16:15	Slovakia	1–5 (1–0, 0–3, 0–2)	Germany	Yubileyny Sports Palace, Saint Petersburg; Attendance: 3,715

Game reference

Branislav Konrád
Július Hudáček
Goalies
Timo Pielmeier
Referees:
(Canada) Brett Iverson
(Finland) Aleksi Rantala
Linesmen:
(Norway) Jon Killian
(United States) Judson Ritter

Cehlárik (Bartánus, Mikuš) – 08:42	1–0
	1–1	24:23 – Hager (Schütz, Gogulla)
	1–2	28:57 – Gogulla (Müller, Hager)
	1–3	34:48 – Reimer (Kahun, Draisaitl) (PP)
	1–4	43:45 – Macek (Braun, Müller)
	1–5	54:36 – Kahun (Reimer, Rieder)

10 min
Penalties
12 min
28
Shots
28

=== Hungary vs France ===
10 May 2016; 20:15	Hungary	2–6 (1–3, 0–1, 1–2)	France	Yubileyny Sports Palace, Saint Petersburg; Attendance: 3,340

Game reference

Miklós Rajna
Goalies
Cristobal Huet
Referees:
(Russia) Roman Gofman
(Slovakia) Jozef Kubuš
Linesmen:
(Switzerland) Roman Kaderli
(Czech Republic) Miroslav Lhotský

	0–1	09:14 – Ritz (Auvitu, Moisand)
M. Vas (G. Nagy, Wehrs) (PP) – 13:10	1–1
	1–2	17:28 – S. Treille
	1–3	19:26 – Fleury (Bellemare, Auvitu) (PP)
	1–4	38:03 – Chakiachvili (Y. Treille)
Sofron (M. Vas, Bartalis) – 47:58	2–4
	2–5	53:03 – S. Treille (Bellemare, Fleury) (PP)
	2–6	56:11 – S. Treille (Bellemare, Claireaux)

12 min
Penalties
10 min
24
Shots
21

=== Slovakia vs Belarus ===
11 May 2016; 16:15	Slovakia	2–4 (0–0, 2–0, 0–4)	Belarus	Yubileyny Sports Palace, Saint Petersburg; Attendance: 3,172

Game reference

Július Hudáček
Goalies
Vitali Koval
Referees:
(Russia) Roman Gofman
(Finland) Aleksi Rantala
Linesmen:
(Norway) Jon Killian
(Finland) Sakari Suominen

Sekera (Réway, Daňo) (PP2) – 20:47	1–0
Jurčo (Mikuš, L. Hudáček) – 36:26	2–0
	2–1	42:22 – Gotovets (Lisovets)
	2–2	48:34 – Gavrus (Gotovets, Kovyrshin)
	2–3	54:42 – Stepanov (Lisovets)
	2–4	57:16 – Linglet (Platt, Lisovets)

12 min
Penalties
14 min
26
Shots
20

=== Finland vs Hungary ===
11 May 2016; 20:15	Finland	3–0 (0–0, 1–0, 2–0)	Hungary	Yubileyny Sports Palace, Saint Petersburg; Attendance: 3,794

Game reference

Juuse Saros
Goalies
Ádám Vay
Referees:
(Canada) Brett Iverson
(Germany) Daniel Piechaczek
Linesmen:
(Switzerland) Nicolas Fluri
(Sweden) Andreas Malmqvist

Ohtamaa (Komarov) – 36:22	1–0
Koivu (Granlund, Komarov) – 49:27	2–0
Barkov (Laine, Jokinen) (PP) – 56:34	3–0

2 min
Penalties
14 min
51
Shots
13

=== United States vs France ===
12 May 2016; 16:15	United States	4–0 (0–0, 3–0, 1–0)	France	Yubileyny Sports Palace, Saint Petersburg; Attendance: 4,287

Game reference

Mike Condon
Goalies
Florian Hardy
Referees:
(Finland) Stefan Fonselius
(Germany) Daniel Piechaczek
Linesmen:
(Switzerland) Nicolas Fluri
(Russia) Gleb Lazarev

Wideman (Foligno, Larkin) (PP) – 34:23	1–0
Murphy (Matthews, Vatrano) – 36:30	2–0
Compher (Hendricks, Motte) – 39:55	3–0
Skjei (Larkin) – 41:19	4–0

12 min
Penalties
8 min
31
Shots
19

=== Canada vs Germany ===
12 May 2016; 20:15	Canada	5–2 (1–0, 1–2, 3–0)	Germany	Yubileyny Sports Palace, Saint Petersburg; Attendance: 5,369

Game reference

Cam Talbot
Goalies
Timo Pielmeier
Referees:
(Slovakia) Jozef Kubuš
(Switzerland) Tobias Wehrli
Linesmen:
(Switzerland) Roman Kaderli
(United States) Judson Ritter

Hall (Murray) – 03:54	1–0
Perry (Duchene, Brassard) (PP) – 23:22	2–0
	2–1	31:31 – Reimer (Noebels, Kahun)
	2–2	37:36 – Akdag (Gogulla, Schütz)
Hall (McDavid, Matheson) – 43:12	3–2
Jenner (Rielly, Brassard) – 46:50	4–2
Ceci (Reilly) (PP) – 53:17	5–2

8 min
Penalties
6 min
22
Shots
19

=== United States vs Hungary ===
13 May 2016; 16:15	United States	5–1 (0–0, 3–0, 2–1)	Hungary	Yubileyny Sports Palace, Saint Petersburg; Attendance: 3,598

Game reference

Keith Kinkaid
Goalies
Ádám Vay
Referees:
(Russia) Roman Gofman
(Russia) Konstantin Olenin
Linesmen:
(Czech Republic) Miroslav Lhotský
(Finland) Sakari Suominen

Foligno (Wideman, Hanifin) (PP) – 24:37	1–0
Hinostroza (Fasching) – 24:55	2–0
Larkin (McCabe, Murphy) – 34:12	3–0
Foligno – 52:07	4–0
Murphy (Foligno) – 55:20	5–0
	5–1	57:59 – Sofron (Bartalis, Sarauer) (PP)

8 min
Penalties
10 min
37
Shots
8

=== Germany vs Belarus ===
13 May 2016; 20:15	Germany	5–2 (3–0, 1–1, 1–1)	Belarus	Yubileyny Sports Palace, Saint Petersburg; Attendance: 5,275

Game reference

Thomas Greiss
Goalies
Vitali Koval
Referees:
(Finland) Stefan Fonselius
(Canada) Brett Iverson
Linesmen:
(Norway) Jon Killian
(Sweden) Andreas Malmqvist

Reimer (Müller) – 04:26	1–0
Draisaitl (Noebels, Macek) – 05:44	2–0
Schütz (Gogulla, Hager) (PP) – 10:47	3–0
	3–1	28:08 – Stepanov (Koval, Linglet) (PP)
Brooks (Reul, Noebels) – 34:23	4–1
	4–2	49:14 – Stas (Lisovets, Koval)
Gogulla (Boyle) (PP, ENG) – 59:51	5–2

8 min
Penalties
4 min
19
Shots
18

=== France vs Finland ===
14 May 2016; 12:15	France	1–3 (0–0, 0–3, 1–0)	Finland	Yubileyny Sports Palace, Saint Petersburg; Attendance: 4,278

Game reference

Cristobal Huet
Ronan Quemener
Goalies
Mikko Koskinen
Referees:
(Russia) Roman Gofman
(Belarus) Maxim Sidorenko
Linesmen:
(Switzerland) Nicolas Fluri
(Czech Republic) Miroslav Lhotský

	0–1	25:00 – Lindell (Granlund, Koivu) (PP)
	0–2	30:40 – Barkov (Laine, Jokinen)
	0–3	34:50 – Laine (Jokinen)
Bellemare (Treille, Auvitu) (PP2) – 52:31	1–3

8 min
Penalties
8 min
18
Shots
19

=== Hungary vs Belarus ===
14 May 2016; 16:15	Hungary	5–2 (2–1, 2–1, 1–0)	Belarus	Yubileyny Sports Palace, Saint Petersburg; Attendance: 4,539

Game reference

Miklós Rajna
Goalies
Kevin Lalande
Vitali Koval
Referees:
(Slovakia) Jozef Kubuš
(Switzerland) Tobias Wehrli
Linesmen:
(United States) Judson Ritter
(Finland) Sakari Suominen

G. Nagy (Sarauer, Kóger) – 5:31	1–0
J. Vas (Sarauer) (SH) – 10:31	2–0
	2–1	12:31 – Platt (Stepanov) (PP)
	2–2	26:43 – Gavrus (Stepanov, Kovyrshin)
Sebők (Szirányi) – 30:32	3–2
Galló (Szirányi, Sofron) – 33:49	4–2
J. Vas (SH,ENG) – 59:57	5–2

10 min
Penalties
12 min
18
Shots
19

=== Canada vs Slovakia ===
14 May 2016; 20:15	Canada	5–0 (2–0, 2–0, 1–0)	Slovakia	Yubileyny Sports Palace, Saint Petersburg; Attendance: 5,512

Game reference

Cam Talbot
Goalies
Július Hudáček
Referees:
(Russia) Konstantin Olenin
(Germany) Daniel Piechaczek
Linesmen:
(Switzerland) Roman Kaderli
(Russia) Gleb Lazarev

Rielly (Brassard) – 11:09	1–0
Duchene (Marchand) – 18:30	2–0
Hall (Stone, McDavid) (PP) – 33:56	3–0
Scheifele (Reinhart, Stone) – 38:35	4–0
Brassard (Perry, Murray) – 50:27	5–0

4 min
Penalties
12 min
33
Shots
18

=== Germany vs United States ===
15 May 2016; 16:15	Germany	3–2 (2–1, 0–1, 1–0)	United States	Yubileyny Sports Palace, Saint Petersburg; Attendance: 4,798

Game reference

Thomas Greiss
Goalies
Mike Condon
Referees:
(Belarus) Maxim Sidorenko
(Switzerland) Tobias Wehrli
Linesmen:
(Switzerland) Nicolas Fluri
(Sweden) Andreas Malmqvist

Hager (Schütz, Boyle) (PP) – 02:19	1–0
	1–1	10:35 – McCabe (Compher, Murphy)
Ehrhoff (Schütz, Hager) – 13:06	2–1
	2–2	20:26 – Matthews (Nelson) (PP)
Holzer (Goc) – 59:27	3–2

14 min
Penalties
6 min
14
Shots
33

=== Slovakia vs Finland ===
15 May 2016; 20:15	Slovakia	0–5 (0–0, 0–2, 0–3)	Finland	Yubileyny Sports Palace, Saint Petersburg; Attendance: 5,679

Game reference

Július Hudáček
Goalies
Juuse Saros
Referees:
(Sweden) Linus Ohlund
(Switzerland) Marc Wiegand
Linesmen:
(Norway) Jon Killian
(United States) Judson Ritter

0–1	31:07 – Koivu (Lindell, Aho) (PP)
0–2	31:47 – Pihlström (Sallinen, Pokka)
0–3	46:46 – Barkov (Hietanen, Jaakola) (EA)
0–4	59:45 – Jokinen (Hietanen, Barkov) (PP)
0–5	59:57 – Laine (Barkov)

8 min
Penalties
4 min
14
Shots
35

=== Canada vs France ===
16 May 2016; 16:15	Canada	4–0 (1–0, 1–0, 2–0)	France	Yubileyny Sports Palace, Saint Petersburg; Attendance: 5,219

Game reference

Calvin Pickard
Goalies
Ronan Quemener
Referees:
(Czech Republic) Antonín Jeřábek
(Sweden) Linus Ohlund
Linesmen:
(Norway) Jon Killian
(Finland) Sakari Suominen

Stone (Hall, McDavid) (PP) – 08:32	1–0
Duchene (Perry, Ellis) – 35:26	2–0
Scheifele (Stone, Marchand) – 43:51	3–0
Perry (O'Reilly, Gallagher) – 54:45	4–0

4 min
Penalties
8 min
46
Shots
13

=== Germany vs Hungary ===
16 May 2016; 20:15	Germany	4–2 (0–1, 1–0, 3–1)	Hungary	Yubileyny Sports Palace, Saint Petersburg; Attendance: 5,038

Game reference

Thomas Greiss
Goalies
Miklós Rajna
Referees:
(Czech Republic) Martin Fraňo
(Russia) Konstantin Olenin
Linesmen:
(Switzerland) Roman Kaderli
(Russia) Gleb Lazarev

	0–1	09:09 – Sofron (Bartalis)
Hager (PP) – 31:42	1–1
Reul – 41:22	2–1
	2–2	45:14 – Wehrs (Magosi)
Braun (Akdag, Draisaitl) – 57:24	3–2
Goc (Seidenberg, Greiss) (ENG) – 59:27	4–2

4 min
Penalties
8 min
34
Shots
16

=== United States vs Slovakia ===
17 May 2016; 12:15	United States	2–3 OT (0–1, 1–0, 1–1); OT (0–1)	Slovakia	Yubileyny Sports Palace, Saint Petersburg; Attendance: 5,080

Game reference

Keith Kinkaid
Goalies
Július Hudáček
Referees:
(Czech Republic) Antonín Jeřábek
(Belarus) Maxim Sidorenko
Linesmen:
(Russia) Gleb Lazarev
(Finland) Sakari Suominen

	0–1	18:39 – Jaroš (Viedenský)
Nelson (Warsofsky, Vatrano) (PP) – 27:15	1–1
Foligno (Larkin) – 42:53	2–1
	2–2	52:14 – Skalický (Marcinko, Graňák)
	2–3	60:59 – Daňo (Švarný, Meszároš)

10 min
Penalties
4 min
25
Shots
30

=== Belarus vs France ===
17 May 2016; 16:15	Belarus	3–0 (0–0, 2–0, 1–0)	France	Yubileyny Sports Palace, Saint Petersburg; Attendance: 4,895

Game reference

Vitali Koval
Goalies
Cristobal Huet
Referees:
(Czech Republic) Martin Fraňo
(Sweden) Linus Ohlund
Linesmen:
(Switzerland) Roman Kaderli
(Sweden) Andreas Malmqvist

Stas (Linglet, Gotovets) – 25:12	1–0
Platt (Linglet, Gotovets) – 38:23	2–0
Stas (Linglet, Platt) – 44:59	3–0

12 min
Penalties
12 min
32
Shots
21

=== Canada vs Finland ===
17 May 2016; 20:15	Canada	0–4 (0–0, 0–3, 0–1)	Finland	Yubileyny Sports Palace, Saint Petersburg; Attendance: 5,890

Game reference

Cam Talbot
Goalies
Mikko Koskinen
Referees:
(Russia) Roman Gofman
(Switzerland) Tobias Wehrli
Linesmen:
(Czech Republic) Miroslav Lhotský
(United States) Judson Ritter

0–1	26:10 – Kivistö (Rantanen)
0–2	36:03 – Komarov (Granlund)
0–3	38:50 – Pyörälä (Aho)
0–4	42:32 – Koskiranta (Pyörälä)

12 min
Penalties
4 min
21
Shots
19
