= 2007–08 FFHG Division 1 season =

The 2007–08 FFHG Division 1 season was contested by 14 teams, and saw the Bisons de Neuilly-sur-Marne win the championship. They were promoted to the Ligue Magnus as result. The Anges du Vésinet were relegated to FFHG Division 2.

== Regular season ==
	Team	GP	W	T	L	Pts	GF	GA
1.	Rapaces de Gap	26	24	1	1	49	142	60
2.	Bisons de Neuilly-sur-Marne	26	22	0	4	44	182	98
3.	Vipers de Montpellier	26	17	3	6	37	122	69
4.	Boxers de Bordeaux	26	14	4	8	32	129	93
5.	Castors d’Avignon	26	14	2	10	30	96	88
6.	Coqs de Courbevoie	26	13	0	13	26	108	109
7.	Galaxians d’Amnéville	26	12	2	12	26	98	110
8.	Lynx de Valence	26	10	4	12	24	92	97
9.	Chevaliers du Lac d’Annecy	26	10	3	13	23	93	119
10.	Jokers de Cergy-Pontoise	26	10	2	14	22	101	129
11.	Chiefs de Garges	26	9	2	15	20	127	146
12.	Jets de Viry-Châtillon	26	7	0	19	14	85	105
13.	Phénix de Reims	26	5	4	17	13	71	123
14.	Anges du Vésinet	26	1	1	24	3	68	168

== Playoffs ==
=== Semifinals ===
- Vipers de Montpellier - Bisons de Neuilly-sur-Marne 5:4/5:8
- Boxers de Bordeaux - Rapaces de Gap 3:4/3:6

=== Finals ===
- Bisons de Neuilly-sur-Marne - Rapaces de Gap 4:2/4:5
