= Dušan Velič =

Slovak scientist (1966–2023)

- Born: 15 October 1966; Žilina, Czechoslovakia
- Died: 31 July 2023 (aged 56); Bratislava, Slovakia
- Occupation(s): Scientist, politician

Dušan Velič (15 October 1966 – 31 July 2023) was a Slovak physical chemist and politician. He served as a State Secretary at the Ministry of Investment, Regional Development, and Informatization from April 2021 to May 2023.

== Early life and education ==
Dušan Velič was born on 15 October 1966 in Žilina. He studied at the Slovak University of Technology in Bratislava, graduating in 1990. Following his graduation, he went on to get his PhD at the Wayne State University, which he obtained in 1996.

== Academic career ==
After his PhD, Velič spent two years as a postdoctoral researcher at the Fritz Haber Institute of the Max Planck Society. In 1998, he joined the Comenius University, where he taught until his death. He became a full professor at the Comenius University in 2021. In the early 2000s, he co-founded the International Laser Centre in Bratislava, where he remained active until his death.

== Political career ==
Dušan Velič joined the Slovak government as a State Secretary at the Ministry of Investment, Regional Development in April 2021, following the resignation of Vladimír Ledecký. In the 2022 Slovak regional elections, he ran for the Governor of the Bratislava Region with the endorsement of the For the People and We Are Family parties. He finished fourth with 8.08 % of the vote. He was poised to run also in the 2023 Slovak parliamentary election, on the list of the OĽaNO.

== Personal life and death ==
Dušan Velič died on 31 July 2023, when his motorbike crashed into a car that entered the road from an adjacent parking lot. He was 56.

Velič was the uncle of the OĽaNO MP Andrej Stančík.
