= Juho-Tuomas Appel =

Finnish ice hockey forward

- Born: January 23, 1983 (age 42); Kristinestad, Finland
- Height: 5 ft 10 in (178 cm)
- Weight: 161 lb (73 kg; 11 st 7 lb)
- Position: Forward
- Shot: Left
- Played for: Kärpät
- Playing career: 2002–2012

Juho-Tuomas Appel (born January 23, 1983) is a Finnish former professional ice hockey forward.

Appel began his career with Kärpät and played 13 regular games in the SM-liiga for the team over two seasons between 2001 and 2003. He also played in Mestis for Hokki, KooKoo and Sport between 2003 and 2008. In 2010, Appel joined French Division 1 side Bisons de Neuilly-sur-Marne, helping them earn promotion to the Ligue Magnus that season with 12 goals and 38 assists for 50 points in 26 games. He re-signed for a second season with the Bisons but it proved to be a disappointment for Appel however as he only managed just one goal and eleven assists in 22 games. At the season's conclusion, Appel retired from hockey.

== Career statistics ==
			Regular season					Playoffs
Season	Team	League	GP	G	A	Pts	PIM	GP	G	A	Pts	PIM
2000–01	Oulun Kärpät U18	U18 SM-sarja	35	21	25	46	12	—	—	—	—	—
2000–01	Oulun Kärpät U20	U20 SM-liiga	1	1	0	1	0	—	—	—	—	—
2001–02	Oulun Kärpät U20	U20 SM-liiga	38	13	16	29	14	1	0	0	0	0
2001–02	Oulun Kärpät	SM-liiga	4	0	0	0	2	—	—	—	—	—
2002–03	Oulun Kärpät U20	U20 SM-liiga	28	11	11	22	10	4	0	0	0	0
2002–03	Oulun Kärpät	SM-liiga	9	0	0	0	2	—	—	—	—	—
2003–04	Hokki	Mestis	41	11	14	25	16	4	0	1	1	0
2004–05	Hokki	Mestis	41	18	15	33	10	4	0	2	2	2
2005–06	Hokki	Mestis	—	—	—	—	—	—	—	—	—	—
2006–07	RoKi	Suomi-sarja	22	18	20	38	14	—	—	—	—	—
2006–07	KooKoo	Mestis	9	2	6	8	6	5	1	3	4	2
2007–08	Vaasan Sport	Mestis	45	7	47	54	39	5	0	1	1	6
2008–09	Kiekko-Laser	Suomi-sarja	18	8	22	30	14	—	—	—	—	—
2009–10	Kiekko-Laser	Suomi-sarja	25	11	34	45	8	—	—	—	—	—
2010–11	Bisons de Neuilly-sur-Marne	France2	26	12	38	50	28	4	2	5	7	0
2011–12	Bisons de Neuilly-sur-Marne	Ligue Magnus	22	1	11	12	6	—	—	—	—	—
SM-liiga totals			13	0	0	0	4	—	—	—	—	—
Mestis totals			136	38	82	120	71	18	1	7	8	10
