= Ilpo =

Surname list

Ilpo is the given name of the following people:

- Ilpo Koskela (1945–1997), Finnish ice hockey player
- Ilpo Larha (1968–1994), Finnish criminal
- Ilpo Nieminen (born 1961), Finnish sprint canoer
- Ilpo Nuolikivi (1942–2006), Finnish skier in Nordic combined
- Ilpo Salmivirta (born 1983), Finnish ice hockey player
- Ilpo Seppälä (born 1953), Finnish wrestler
- Ilpo Tiihonen (1950–2021), Finnish writer
- Ilpo Väisänen (born 1963), Finnish electronic musician
- Ilpo Verno (born 1981), Finnish footballer
