= Kautto =

Kautto is a Finnish surname. Notable people with the surname include:

- Jani Kautto (born 1989), Finnish ice hockey player
- Juho Kautto (born 1971), Finnish politician
