= Martin Kotásek =

Czech ice hockey forward

- Born: October 26, 1973 (age 52) Zlín, Czechoslovakia
- Height: 5 ft 11 in (180 cm)
- Weight: 185 lb (84 kg; 13 st 3 lb)
- Position: Forward
- Shot: Left
- Played for: HC Zlín; HC Kometa Brno; HC Vítkovice; HC Vsetín; HKm Zitra; HC Dinamo Minsk; Podhale Nowy Targ; Dauphins d'Épinal
- Playing career: 1991–2014

Martin Kotásek (born October 26, 1973) is a Czech former professional ice hockey forward.

Kotásek played 416 games in the Czech Extraliga for HC Zlín, HC Kometa Brno, HC Vítkovice and HC Vsetín. He also played in the Tipsport Liga for HKm Nitra, the Belarusian Extraleague for HC Dinamo Minsk, the Ligue Magnus for Dauphins d'Épinal and the Polska Liga Hokejowa for Podhale Nowy Targ.
