= Vladimír Ledecký =

Slovak politician

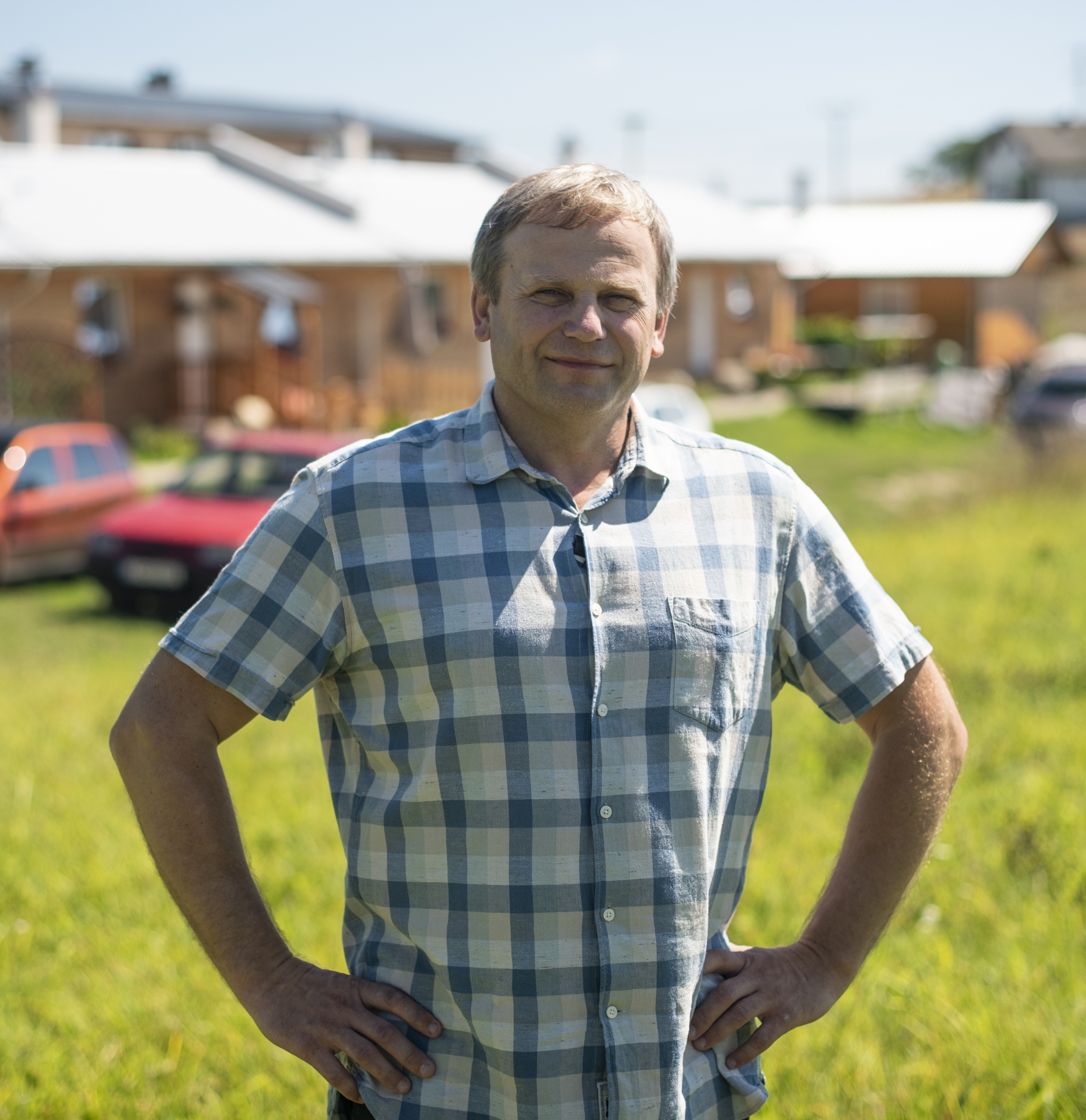

Member of the National Council
- Incumbent
- Assumed office 7 April 2021
- In office 20 March 2020 – 30 June 2020

Personal details
- Born: 14 February 1966 (age 60) Levoča, Czechoslovakia
- Party: For the People (2019—2021) parliamentary club Sloboda a Solidarita (since 2021)
- Children: Vladimíra Marcinková
- Education: Constantine the Philosopher University in Nitra (M.Sc.)

Vladimír Ledecký (born 14 February 1966) is a Slovak politician who was a member of the National Council of Slovakia and former state secretary at the Ministry of Investments, Regional Development and Informatization of Slovakia. He was a member of the presidency of For the People, where he acted as a guarantor for regional development. Ledecký served as mayor of Spišský Hrhov from 1998 until 2020 as well as deputy of the Prešov self-governing region from 2005 until 2022. Ledecký has been the SaS parliamentary club since 2023.

== Political career ==
=== Communal and regional politics ===
In the 2020 Slovak parliamentary election, Ledecký announced that he would give up the mandate of mayor of Spišský Hrhov.

Ledecký became known not only in Slovakia, but also abroad due to his exemplary work with the Roma community. The New York Times wrote that the village is an example of prosperity thanks to the integration of the Roma, and highlighted in particular the availability of running water and electricity, in contrast to other eastern Slovak villages. During his 21 years in office, he managed to make all municipal buildings and schools functional and at the same time start several successful projects.

Under his leadership, the village received many awards, such as the Mayor of the Year, Village of the Year or EU Prize for Roma inclusion among others.

Apart from the position of mayor, Ledecký was also a member of the Prešov self-governing region council for four electoral terms between 2005 and 2022. In 2013, he was elected as a deputy for the Levoča district for Direction – Social Democracy with 2,034 votes. In the 2022 regional elections, he ran as a nominee of the parties KDH, We Are Family, Freedom and Solidarity, and For the People. He received 2,103 votes and was not re-elected after 17 years.

=== State secretary and member of the National Council of Slovakia ===
Ledecký was one of the founding members of the emerging party of former president Andrej Kiska named For the People in 2019. At its constituent assembly on 28 September 2019 in Košice, he was elected vice-chairman of the party. In 2020, Ledecký was the state secretary for regional development at the newly established Ministry of Investments, Regional Development and Informatization of Slovakia. At the beginning of April 2021, Ledecký resigned from the post of state secretary at his own request, because he did not find support for his intentions in the leadership of the ministry and bought back his mandate as a member of the National Council.

In 2023 Slovak parliamentary election, Ledecký ran from the 16th place on the candidate list of the Freedom and Solidarity party. He received 16,300 preferential votes and finished in 9th place after preferential voting was taken into account.

== Personal life ==
Ledecký is the father of Vladimíra Marcinková, member of the Slovak National Council, and the father-in-law of hockey player Tomáš Marcinko. His brother Miroslav has been the mayor of the village of Drahovce in the district of Piešťany since 2018.

A timelapse documentary To ta monarchia by director Vladislava Sárkány about Ledecký's activities in Spišský Hrhov was broadcast online at the One World festival in 2020. The director tells of the documentary as a probe into the story of the village, which reached its peak thanks to a strong community of interesting people at the head with the mayor.
