= Tomáš Myšička =

Czech ice hockey left winger

- Born: April 8, 1978 (age 47) Prague, Czechoslovakia
- Height: 5 ft 9 in (175 cm)
- Weight: 183 lb (83 kg; 13 st 1 lb)
- Position: Left wing
- Shot: Right
- Played for: HC Sparta Praha; Ducs d'Angers
- Playing career: 1998–2008

Tomáš Myšička (born April 8, 1978) is a Czech former professional ice hockey left winger.

Myšička played one game for HC Sparta Praha during the 1998–99 Czech Extraliga season. The following year, he moved to France where he played the remainder of his career, beginning with Dauphins d'Épinal of the FFHG Division 1 where he spent four seasons. In 2003, Myšička moved to Ducs d'Angers of the Ligue Magnus. He had an enjoyable first season with 12 goals and 25 points from 23 games, but in his second season his production dropped to just five goals and ten points in 24 games.

In 2005, he returned to Division 1 with Corsaires de Dunkerque before moving to Bisons de Neuilly-sur-Marne a year later. He helped the team earn promotion to the Ligue Magnus in the 2007–08 season, which would be his last as a player.

Myšička played in the 1996 IIHF European U18 Championship for the Czech Republic where he scored two goals and registered two assists in five games.
