= Andrej Stančík =

Slovak politician

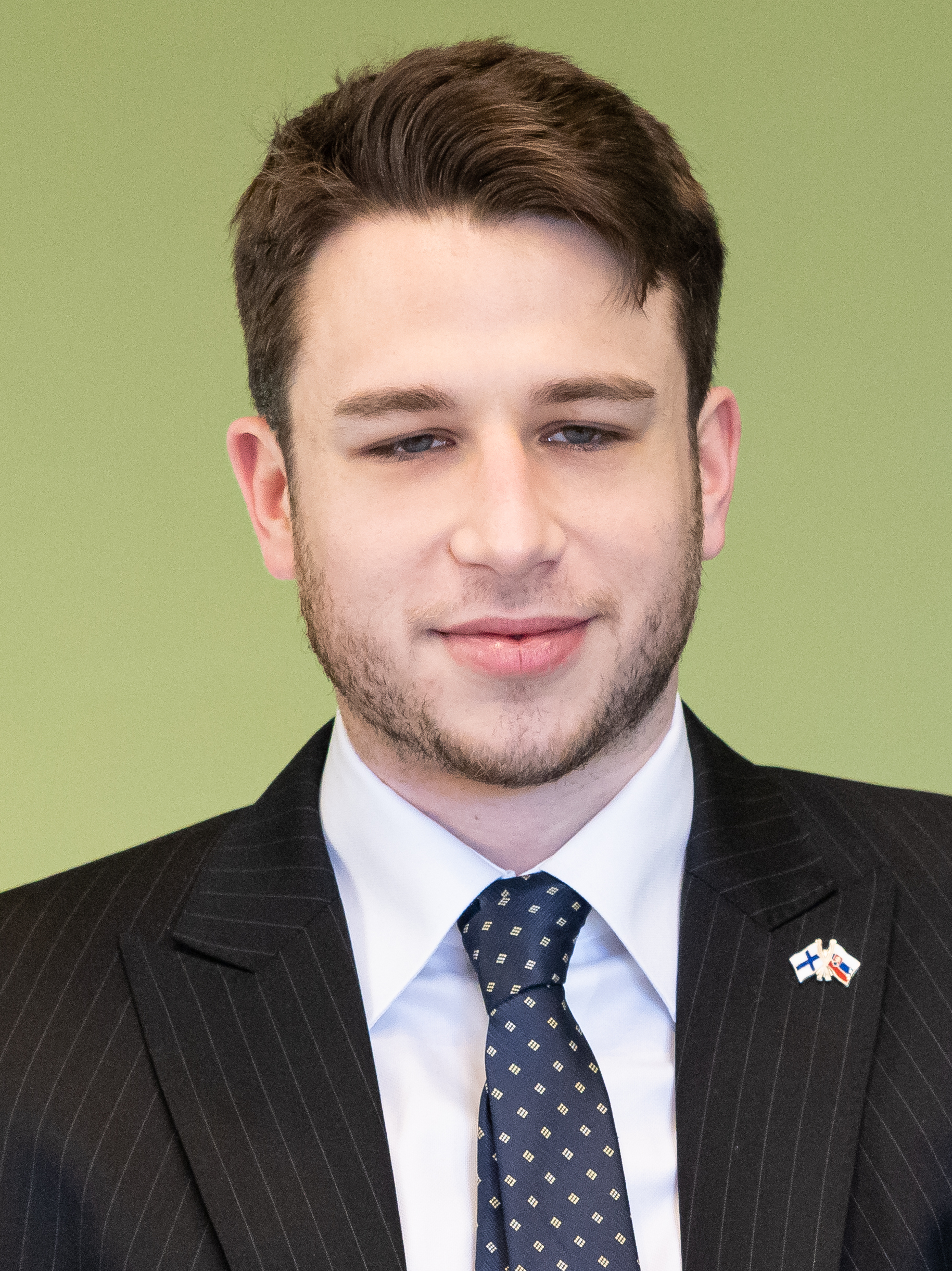

State Secretary of the Ministry of Foreign and European Affairs
- In office 29 September 2022 – 15 May 2023

Member of the National Council
- In office 21 March 2020 – 29 September 2022
- In office 15 May 2023 – 25 October 2023

Personal details
- Born: 1 June 1995 (age 30) Piešťany, Slovakia
- Party: Ordinary People and Independent Personalities (2020-2023); Democrats (2023-)
- Education: Masaryk University

Andrej Stančík (born 1 June 1995) is a Slovak politician, who has been an MP of the National Council since 2020. He is a member of the Ordinary People and Independent Personalities (OĽANO) movement caucus.

== Early life ==
Stančík was born in Piešťany and studied International Relations at the Masaryk University, graduating in 2019. He pursued PhD at the same university, but suspended his studies when he was named state secretary.

== Member of the parliament ==
Stančík ran in the 2020 Slovak parliamentary election on the OĽaNO list and was elected to parliament. He joined the government as a State Secretary at the Ministry of Foreign and European Affairs in October 2022, but gave up his MP seat as per the Slovak Constitution which prohibits government members to sit in the parliament for the duration of their membership in the government.

== Personal life ==
His uncle Dušan Velič (1966–2023) was the State Secretary of Investment, Regional Development, and Informatization at the same time when Stančík was a member of the government.
