= Jani Virtanen =

Jani Virtanen may refer to:

- Jani Tapani Virtanen, Finnish footballer
- Jani Virtanen (ice hockey), Finnish ice hockey player
