= Gyula Tornai =

Hungarian painter (1861–1928)

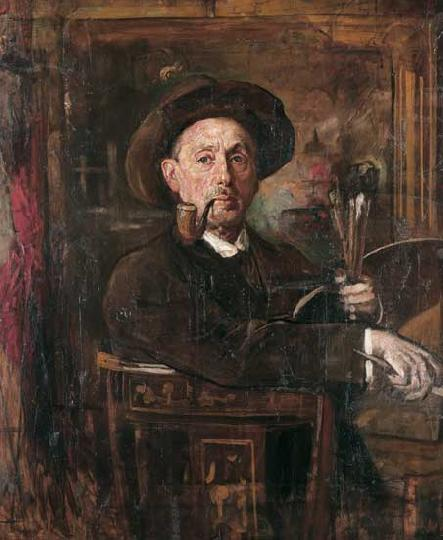
- Self-portrait
- Born: Gyula Tornai; 12 April 1861; Görgö, Hungary
- Died: 24 November 1928 (aged 67); Budapest, Hungary
- Movement: Academic Art; Orientalist themes

Gyula Tornai (12 April 1861 in Görgő – 24 November 1928 in Budapest) was a Hungarian painter, now featured in the Hungarian National Gallery. He was a noted painter in the Orientalist genre.

== Education and career ==
Tornai was born in Görgö, Hungary (today Spišský Hrhov, Slovakia), in 1861. He received his art education at academies in Vienna, Munich and at Benczúr's Studios in Budapest where he studied under Hans Makart and Gyula Benczúr. His initial paintings were pictures of popular everyday themes such as the Good Fat, Camelian Lady. His style was heavily influenced by Makart (Makartstil or "Makart’s style" in German).

Following his travels to Spain, Algeria and Morocco, he turned to more exotic themes and painted works depicting street life, merchants, musicians and harems. He spent 10 years in Morocco and lived in Tangiers for a year between 1890 and 1891. In 1900, he exhibited pictures in the Exposition Universelle in Paris to great acclaim, winning the bronze medal. In 1904, he sold many of his works to raise money for further travel.

In the Summer of 1905, he travelled to Far-East where he continued his interest in Orientalist themes. During this period he travelled through India and Japan. Shortly after his arrival in Japan, he painted a portrait of the former Prime-Minister, Count Okuma, who became an influential patron. This patronage gave him unprecedented access to many facets of Japanese life and customs that had previously been hidden from Europeans. This allowed him to explore Buddhism and Shintoism in depth. Tornai remained in Japan for 16 months during which time he painted such works as A Japanese Princess Going to Church, Geisha, The Geisha House and the Samurai Warrior amongst other paintings.

In 1907 he was exhibited in Paris and London; in 1909 at Budapest in the Műcsarnok; in 1917 at the National Salon. In 1929, the auction hall organized an exhibition of legacies from his works.

His Oriental works gained him international recognition during his own lifetime. A contemporary source commented that his works from this period, ”the like of which for glory of colour and intense appreciation of the picturesqueness of the east had not been seen before.” His paintings are also noted for their irony, humour and wit. For instance, his painting The Connoisseurs features a group of locals, possibly Berbers, gathered in the artist's studio critically examining a painting of Oriental men. These men were probably the subject of the painting. He also gave viewers glimpses of another world with his depictions of Oriental customs and practices. Several of Tornai's paintings are held in the Hungarian National Gallery.

== Gallery ==
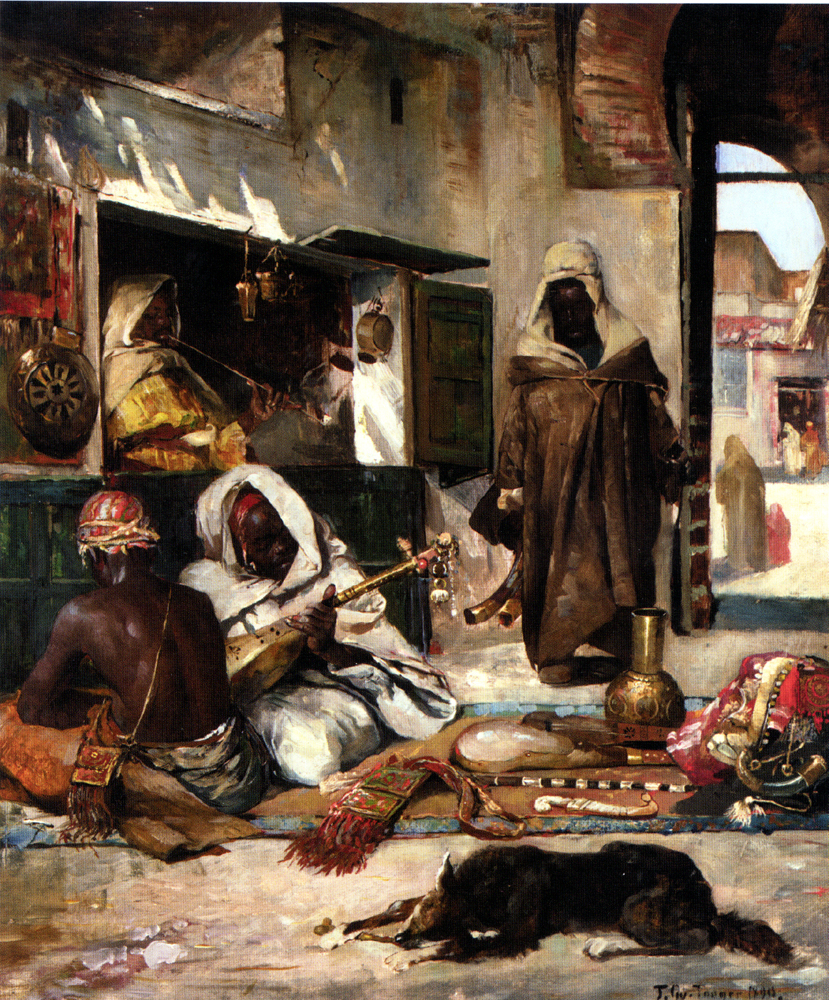
An Arms Merchant in Tangiers, 1890

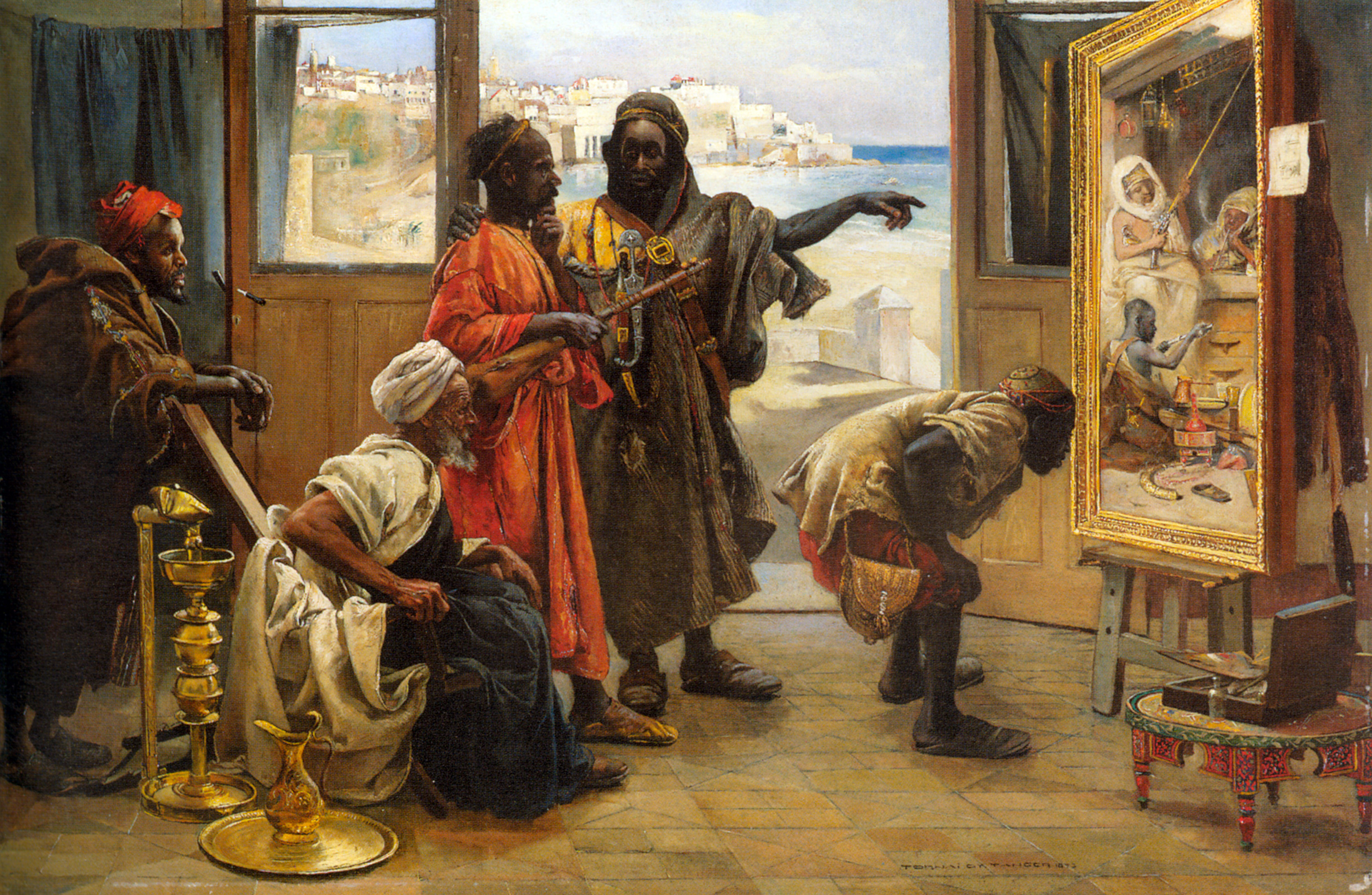
The Connoisseurs, 1892

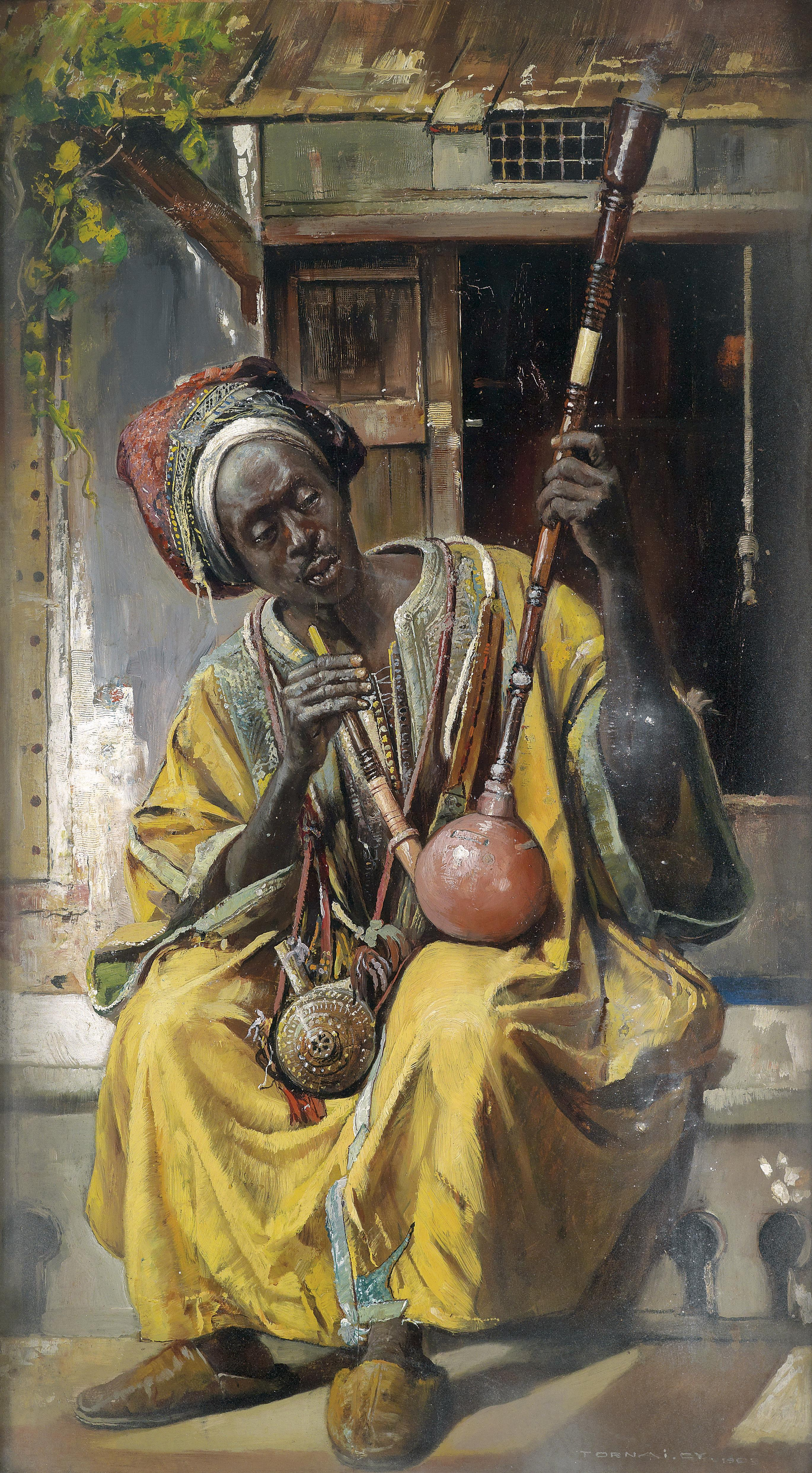
The Water-Pipe Smoker, 1903

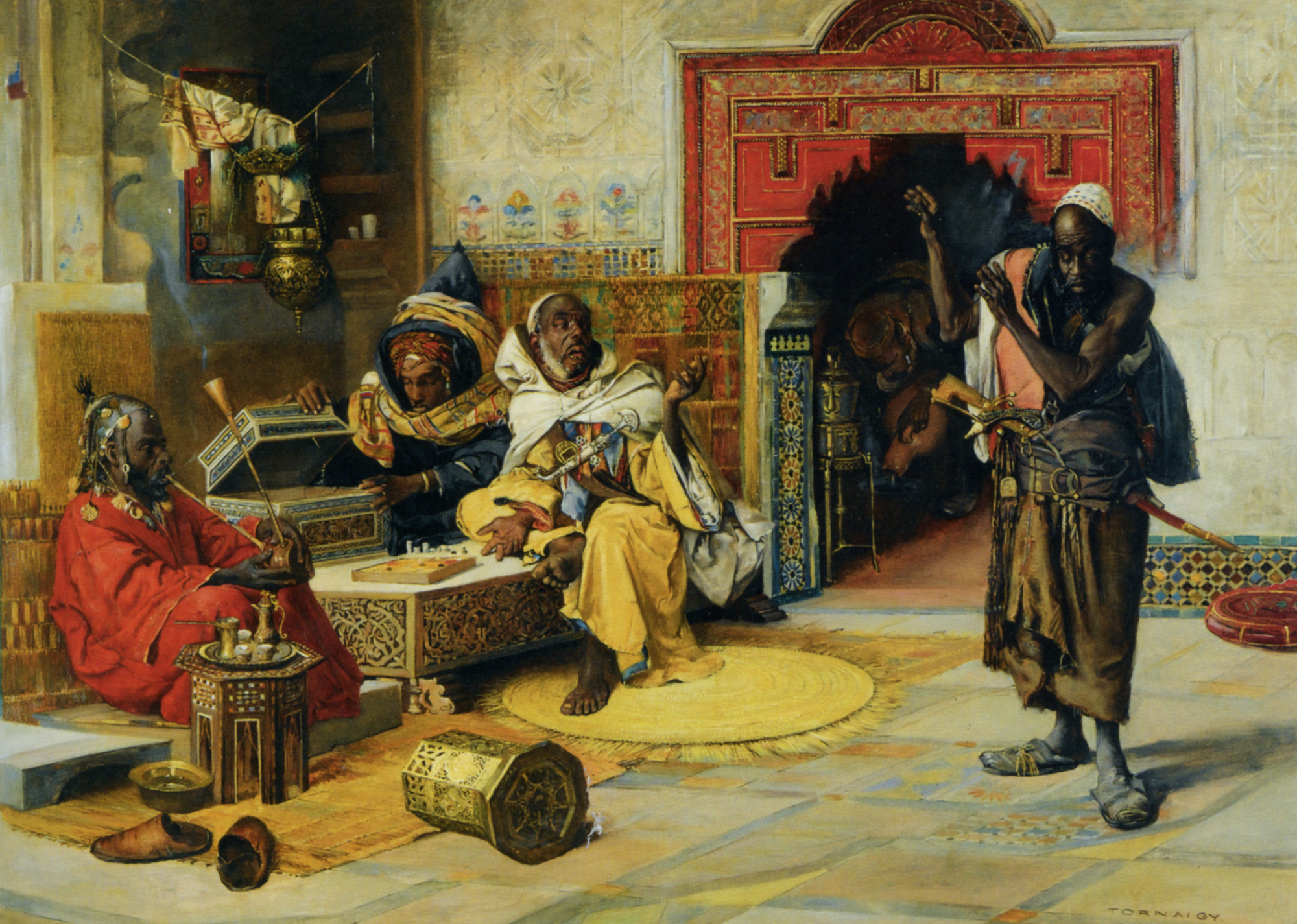
The Unfair Game, 1904

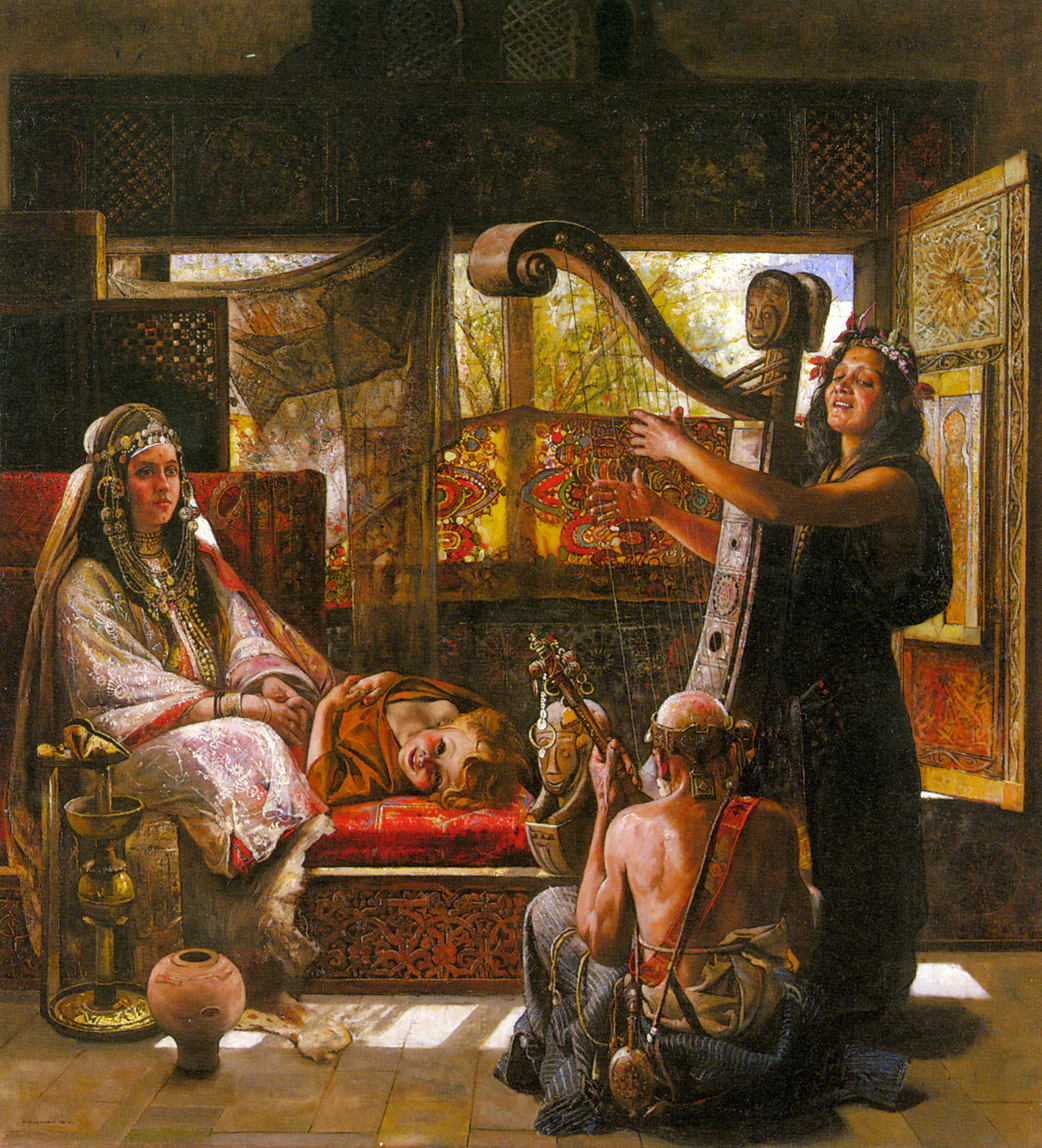
A Musical Afternoon, n.d.

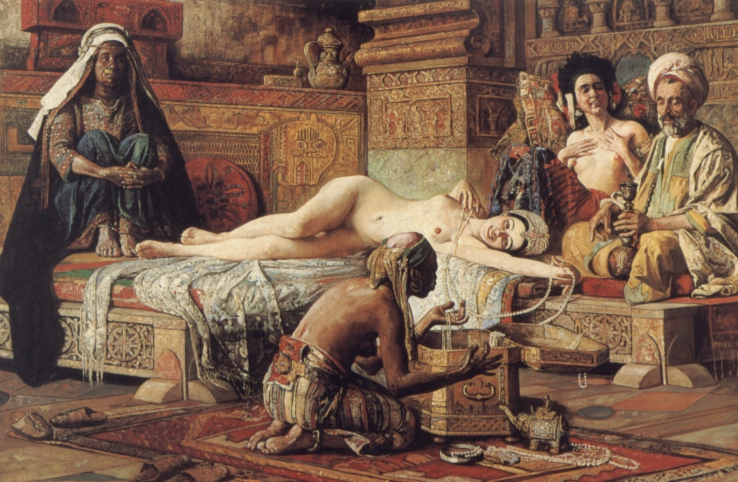
In the Harem, n.d.

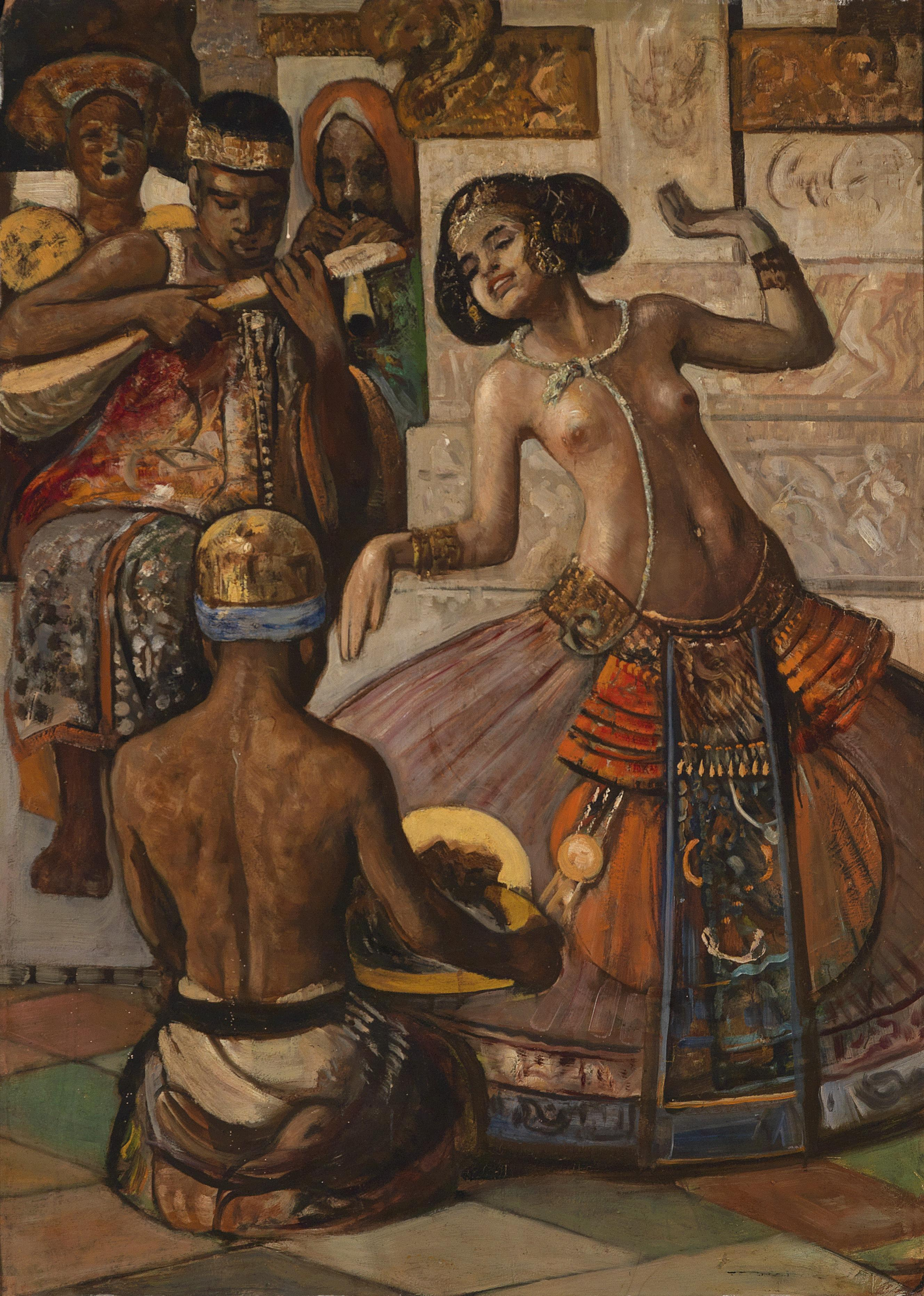
Balinese Dancer, n.d.

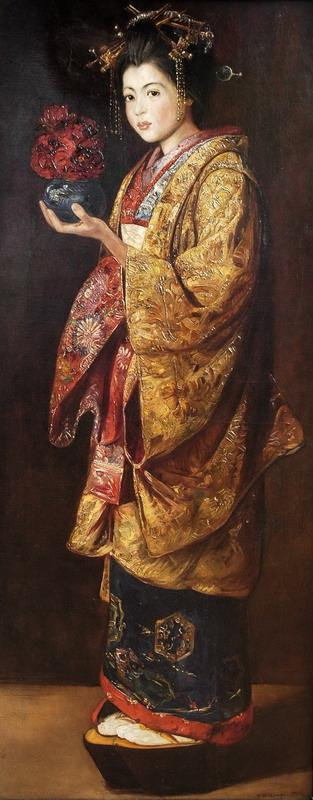
Geisha, c. 1905

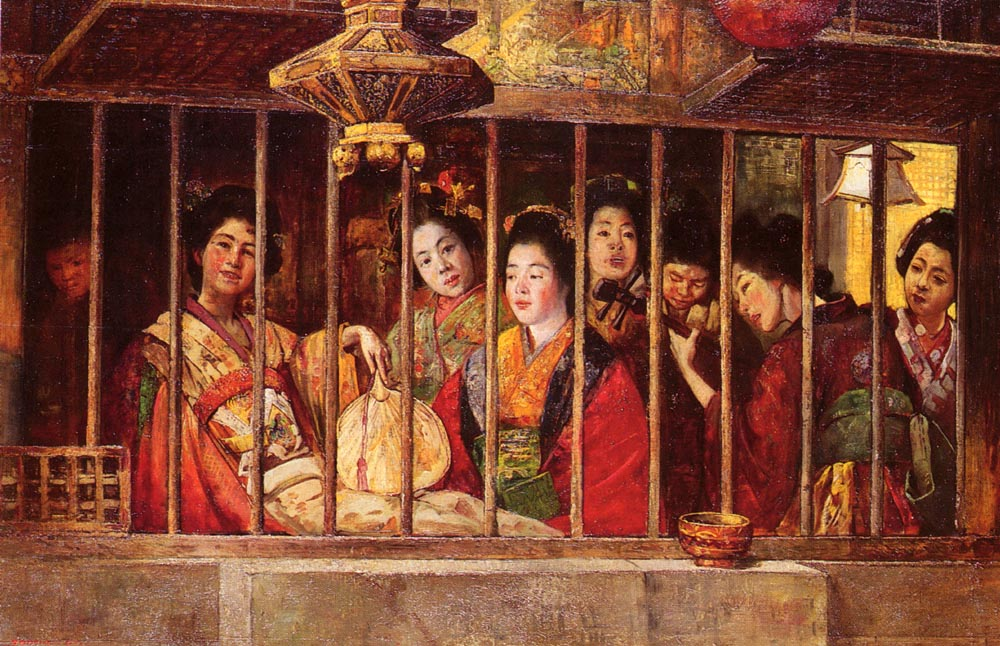
The Geisha House, n.d.

== Select list of paintings ==
- La Dame au Camelias
- An Arms Merchant in Tangiers, 1890
- Travelling Musicians c. 1891
- African Woman, n.d. (Nice Art Gallery)
- The Jewelry Maker n.d.
- Portrait of an Oriental Man, n.d.
- At the Bazaar n.d.
- The Unfair Game n.d. (Shafik Gabr Private Collection)
- Discussion on the Carpet n.d.
- Artista Ungherese n.d.
- Warriors, n.d.
- The Moorish Smoker, n.d.
- The Moroccan Bride n.d.
- The Shisha Smoker, n.d.
- Oriental Smoker with Hookah and Marabou n.d.
- At the Shrine, 1907
- A Japanese Princess Going to Church, c. 1909

== See also ==
- List of Orientalist artists
- Orientalism
