= Vladimíra Marcinková =

Slovak politician (born 1991)

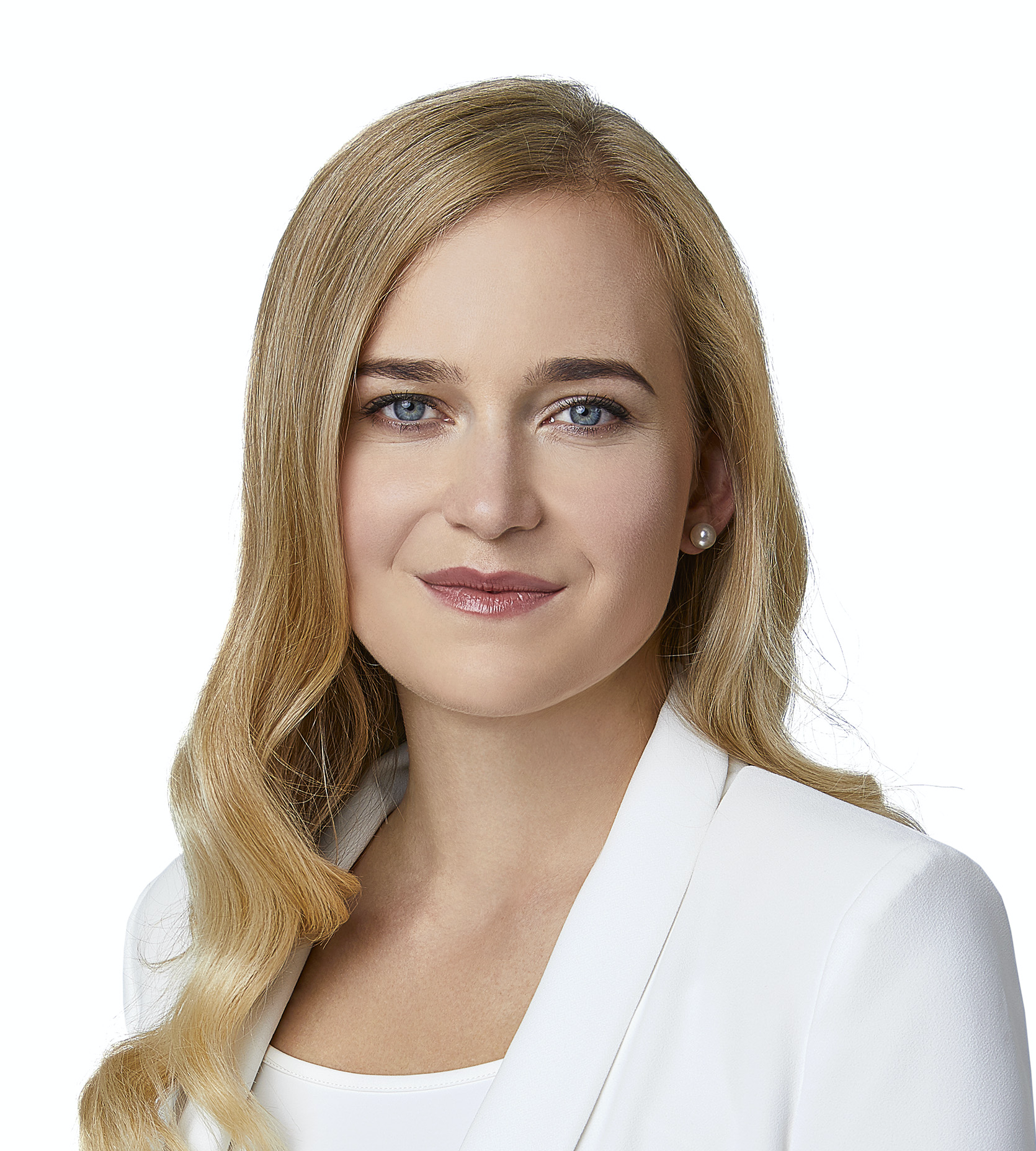

Member of the National Council
- Incumbent
- Assumed office 20 March 2020

Personal details
- Born: 17 August 1991 (age 35) Levoča, Czechoslovakia (now Slovakia)
- Party: For the People (2019-2021); Freedom and Solidarity (since 2021)
- Spouse: Tomáš Marcinko
- Children: 2
- Education: Pavol Jozef Šafárik University

Vladimíra Marcinková (née Ledecká, born 17 August 1991 in Levoča) is a Slovak politician and, since 2020, a member of the National Council of the Slovak Republic, where she currently also serves as the chairperson of the Committee for European Affairs. She is currently a member of the SaS parliamentary club and ran for the party as a non-member candidate in the 2023 Slovak parliamentary election.

== Early life and career ==
Marcinková was born in Levoča and originates from Spišský Hrhov. She studied law at the University of Pavel Jozef Šafárik in Košice.

She worked as a volunteer on the campaign of Andrej Kiska in the presidential elections in 2014. Later, she joined the president's team, where she was the head of the regional policy department and was also in charge of innovation and the business environment.

== Politics ==
In 2019, Marcinková was one of the founding members of the emerging party of former president Andrej Kiska, ZA ĽUDÍ. At its constituent assembly (September 28, 2019 in Košice), she was elected as a member of the party's presidency. In the parliamentary elections in 2020, she ran from 11th place as a candidate for ZA ĽUDÍ and entered parliament as a member of this party. In the elections, she received 15,567 preferential votes and after taking preferential voting into account, she finished in 6th place in the party.

In the parliament, she was the vice-chairwoman of Committee for Human Rights and Minorities and a member of Committee for Social Affairs. In May 2021, she was elected by the parliament as the chairperson of the Committee for European Affairs and thus became the first woman to hold this position.

In September 2021, together with the platform around the Minister of Justice Mária Kolíková, she left the party For the People, and in the SaS parliamentary club they created the platform For fair Slovakia, but they did not join the party itself.

For a long time, she has been supporting the participation of women and young people in politics.

== Legislative and political initiative ==
In the parliament, she mainly deals with human rights and social issues.

As a member of the Committee for Human Rights and Minorities, together with MP Ondrej Dostál, in May 2020, she initiated a parliamentary inquiry into the Office of the Commissioner for Children due to reasonable concerns that the activities of the office and the commissioner herself cannot be fully trust in the agenda, such as the protection of children's rights and the promotion of their best interests.

In connection with the discussion of the petition For the climate, for the future in March 2021, Marcinková proposed an amending resolution for the parliament to declare a state of climate emergency, which was not approved by the deputies.

In June 2021, at the Committee for European Affairs, she presented a resolution on the arrest and kidnapping of Belarusian journalist and activist Roman Pratasevic, which was approved by the committee members. Subsequently, at a press conference together with Prime Minister Heger, she welcomed harsh sanctions against Alexander Lukashenko's regime in Belarus.

She acted as the initiator and co-sponsor of several legislative changes that expanded children's rights and social assistance to mothers and families. The laws related to changes, such as increasing the amount of maternity pay for female police officers and soldiers, expanding the right to a one-time allowance for placing a child in foster care, allowing grandparents to receive parental allowance, expanding work rights for pregnant members of fire and rescue services that take care of a child younger than 3 years, enabling the presence of a close person during childbirth, introducing paternity leave for 14 days after childbirth or supporting the establishment of company nurseries.

On February 24, 2022, the Committee for European Affairs, under her leadership, was the first among the committees of the European Union member countries to condemn Russia's aggression in Ukraine, supported the independence and territorial integrity of Ukraine, and called for a vigorous, quick and unified response by the member states of the European Union and NATO.

In January 2023, she launched a petition to support enshrining the right of children to have a parent with them in hospital. The petition was signed by more than 50,000 people within a few days.

As part of her activities, she supports the rights of minorities and other vulnerable groups. She publicly defended the rights of transgender people several times during the parliamentary debate. She has long supported the expansion of the rights of LGBTI people. In June 2022, she opposed a bill that would have banned the display of the rainbow flag on public buildings and hung a rainbow flag from the window of her parliamentary office as a sign of support for the LGBT community. The submission of a law that will increase the protection of particularly vulnerable victims of crimes and protect them from secondary victimization is also related to the support of vulnerable groups of the population.

She was significantly involved in the election of the Commissioner for Children and the Public Defender of Rights. She nominated Marián Török, the former head of the ombudsman's office, for the position of ombudsman. At the same time, she enforced the law on the basis of which the Public Defender of Rights remains in his position until his successor is elected. This will prevent this office from becoming functional.

Alongside her activities related to minorities and other groups, she also supports women's rights and rejects the tightening of abortion laws, which are regularly submitted to the parliament.

She rejects cooperation with extremists and a populist style of doing politics.

== Personal life ==
Her husband is the ice hockey player Tomáš Marcinko. They have two children.

She is the daughter of former mayor Spišský Hrhov and former state secretary at the Ministry of Investments, Regional Development and Informatization, Vladimír Ledecký.

== Awards ==
2019 Forbes 30 under 30
