= Jani Virtanen (ice hockey) =

Finnish ice hockey player

- Born: March 1, 1977 (age 48); Tampere, FIN
- Height: 6 ft 1 in (185 cm)
- Weight: 220 lb (100 kg; 15 st 10 lb)
- Position: Defence
- Shot: Left
- Played for: Tappara; Titaanit; Hermes; HPK; FPS; SaiPa; Espoo Blues; Färjestads BK; Bakersfield Condors; SG Brunico; Scorpions de Mulhouse; Malmö Redhawks; EfB Ishockey; SV Kaltern; Hull Stingrays; Bisons de Neuilly-sur-Marne
- Playing career: 1997–2009

Jani Virtanen (born March 1, 1977, in Tampere, Finland) is a Finnish former professional ice hockey defenceman.

== Career ==
Virtanen began his career in 1993 with Tappara, playing in their junior teams at under-18 and under-20 level as well as one game for the main senior team during the 1997–98 season. He had spells with third-tier team Titaanit and second-tier team Hermes, where he scored a career high 10 goals and 17 points, before returning to SM-liiga with HPK for the 2000–01 season, which included single game stints at Hermes and FPS in the newly formed second-tier Mestis.

Virtanen then divided the next two season with SaiPa and Espoo Blues as well as a stint in Sweden's Elitserien with Färjestads BK. In 2003, he moved to North America and signed with the Bakersfield Condors of the ECHL where he scored a career high 10 assists.

He then moved to Italy's Serie A with SG Brunico as well as a two-game stint with Scorpions de Mulhouse in France's Ligue Magnus before returning to Scandinavia and to Sweden in 2005, this time with the Malmö Redhawks of the second-tier HockeyAllsvenskan. After 17 games, he departed and moved to Denmark to sign for EfB Ishockey in the Metal Ligaen

Virtanen then had spells with SV Kaltern in Italy's Serie B, the Hull Stingrays of the Elite Ice Hockey League in the United Kingdom and a return to Ligue Magnus with Bisons de Neuilly-sur-Marne before retiring in 2009.
