= Williams Lake TimberWolves =

Junior "A" ice hockey team

Williams Lake TimberWolves
City	Williams Lake, British Columbia
League	British Columbia Hockey League
Founded	2002
Home Arena	Cariboo Memorial Recreation Complex
Colours	Red, Black, and White

The Williams Lake TimberWolves were a Junior "A" ice hockey team from Williams Lake, British Columbia, Canada. They were part of the British Columbia Hockey League. The team took a leave of absence for the 2007-08 and 2008-2009 seasons to relocate to Wenatchee, Washington. Due to a disagreement between Hockey Canada and USA Hockey, the relocation failed and the TimberWolves returned to play in Williams Lake in September 2009, with a new logo and new owners. The T-Wolves have not participated since the 2009-10 BCHL season after being suspended by the league for being a franchise "not in good standing", after accumulating heavy debt to local businesses and the league.

== Season-by-season record ==
Note: GP = Games Played, W = Wins, L = Losses, T = Ties, OTL = Overtime Losses, GF = Goals for, GA = Goals against

Season	GP	W	L	T	OTL	GF	GA	Points	Finish	Playoffs
2002-03	60	14	42	0	4	191	300	32	8th in Interior	DNQ
2003-04	60	31	24	1	4	244	243	67	3rd in Interior	Lost in Semi-finals
2004-05	60	24	28	5	3	223	236	56	7th in Interior	DNQ
2005-06	60	16	32	4	8	190	273	44	7th in Interior	DNQ
2006-07	60	18	39	0	3	189	263	39	8th in Interior	Lost in Preliminary
2007-08	Leave of Absence									
2008-09	Leave of Absence									
2009-10	60	10	49	1	0	157	354	21	17th BCHL	DNQ

== See also ==
- List of ice hockey teams in British Columbia
