= Jani Kautto =

Finnish ice hockey player

- Born: October 25, 1989 (age 35); Vantaa, Finland
- Height: 6 ft 0 in (183 cm)
- Weight: 179 lb (81 kg; 12 st 11 lb)
- Position: Goaltender
- Catches: Left
- SM-liiga team: Jokerit
- Playing career: 2010–present

Jani Kautto (born October 25, 1989) is a Finnish ice hockey goaltender. His is currently playing with Kiekko-Vantaa in the Finnish Mestis.
