= Bisons de Neuilly-sur-Marne =

Ice hockey club in Neuilly-sur-Marne, France

HC Neuilly-sur-Marne
- Nickname: Les Bisons/Bisonnes
- City: Neuilly-sur-Marne, France
- League: FFHG Division 1 (Bisons); FFHG Féminin Élite (Bisonnes)
- Founded: 1974
- Home arena: Patinoire municipale de Neuilly-sur-Marne (capacity: 700)
- Colours: Red, black
- President: Ibrahim Soubra
- Head coach: Serge Forcier (Bisons); Luc Tanésie (Bisonnes)
- Captain: Jules Breton (Bisons); Cindy Debuquet Masset (Bisonnes)
- Website: www.hcnm93.com

The Hockey Club Neuilly-sur-Marne 93, abbreviated HCNM93, is a French ice hockey club based in Neuilly-sur-Marne, Île-de-France. The men's representative team, Les Bisons de Neuilly-sur-Marne, plays in the second-tier FFHG Division 1 and the women's representative team, Les Bisonnes de Neuilly-sur-Marne, plays in the top-tier FFHG Féminin Élite.

== History ==
The club was founded in 1974 as HC Neuilly-sur-Marne. Its home arena is the Patinoire municipale de Neuilly-sur-Marne (lit. 'Municipal Ice Rink of Neuilly-sur-Marne').

Les Bisons were Division 1 champions in 2007–08 and 2010–11.

Les Bisonnes won the French Championship in 2012–13, 2013–14, and 2014–15. As league champions, Les Bisonnes were the French representative team at the IIHF European Women's Champions Cup (EWCC) in 2012–13, 2013–14, and 2014–15.

== Notable alumni ==
Seasons played with Neuilly-sur-Marne listed alongside player name.

French players

- Lore Baudrit, 2011–12
- Margot Desvignes, 2014–2018
- Estelle Duvin, 2011–2014
- Raphaëlle Grenier, 2011–2014
- Emmanuelle Passard, 2011–2013
- Nicolas Pousset, 2009–10
- Clara Rozier, 2012–2014
- Grégory Tarlé, 2004–2009

International players

- (Finland) Juho-Tuomas Appel, 2010–2012
- (Canada) Rane Carnegie, 2008–09
- (United States) Jillian Dempsey, 2013–14 EWCC
- (Canada) Kevin Desfossés, 2010–11
- (Canada) (Netherlands) Terry Harrison, 2008–09
- (Finland) Santeri Immonen, 2008–09
- (Canada) Kris Knoblauch, 2005–06
- (Czech Republic) Tomáš Myšička, 2006–2008
- (Israel) (Canada) Eliezer Sherbatov, 2011–2013
- (Finland) Jani Virtanen, 2008–09
