= Spišský Hrhov =

- Municipality
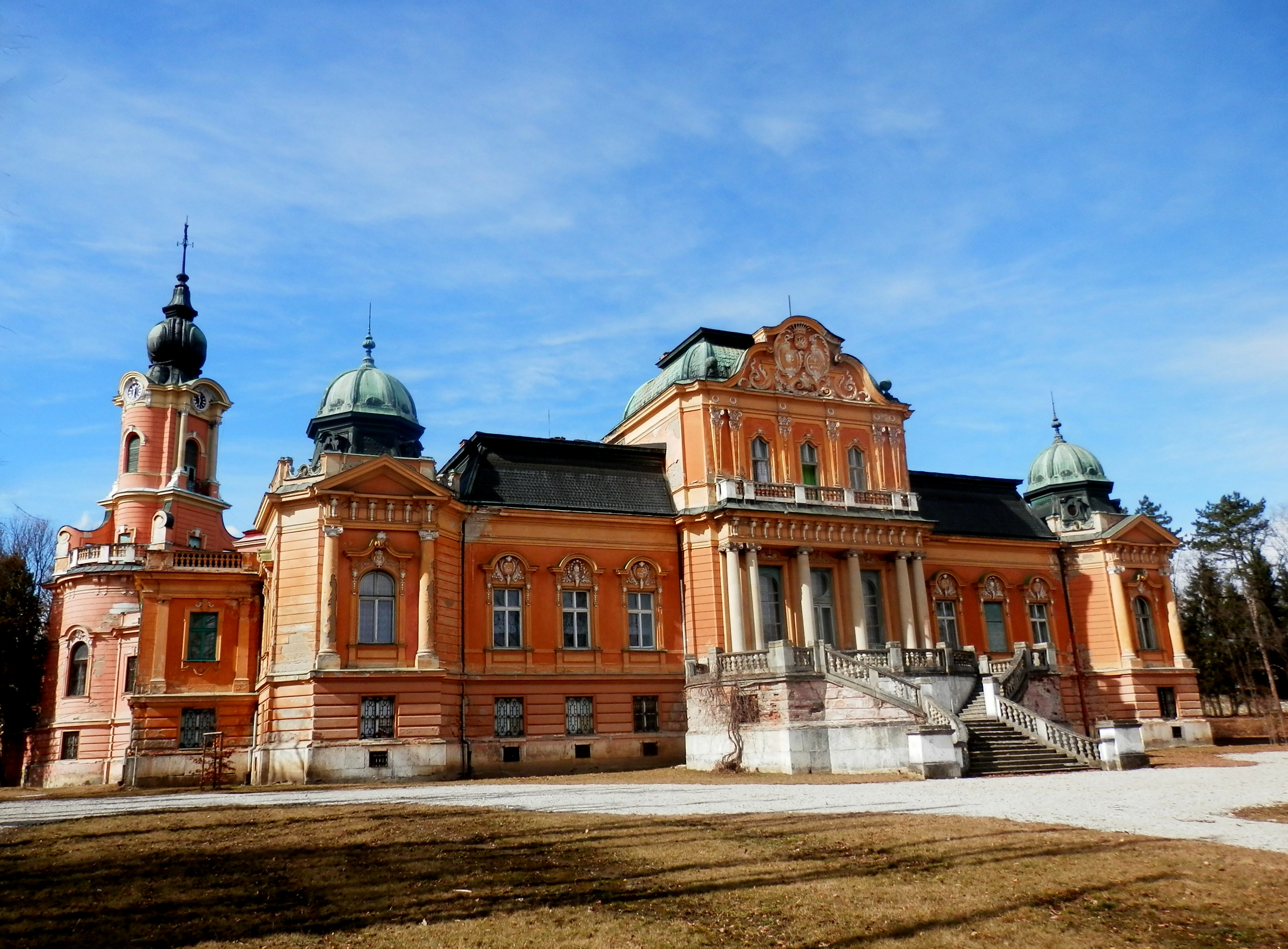

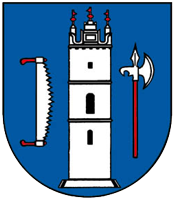
- Flag Coat of arms

- Location of Spišský Hrhov in the Prešov Region Location of Spišský Hrhov in Slovakia
- Coordinates: 49.00°N 20.64°E
- Country: Slovakia
- Region: Prešov Region
- District: Levoča District
- First mentioned: 1243

Area
  - Total: 12.22 km^{2} (4.72 sq mi)
- Elevation: 469 m (1,539 ft)

Population (2025)
  - Total: 1,934
- Time zone: UTC+1 (CET)
  - Summer (DST): UTC+2 (CEST)
- Postal code: 530 2
- Area code: +421 53
- Vehicle registration plate (until 2022): LE
- Website: www.spisskyhrhov.sk

Spišský Hrhov (Slovak pronunciation: [ˈspiʂskiː ˈɦr̩ɦɔw]; Hungarian: Görgő, pronounced [ˈɡørɡøː]) is a municipality and village in the Spiš region of Slovakia, between Levoča and Spišské Podhradie in Levoča District. It has a population of 1800, of which 350 are Roma, well integrated in the local community.

== History ==
The region contains Neolithic remains, but the earliest written reference to Spišský Hrhov dates from 1243. Originally there were two neighbouring villages named Hrhov, one Slovak and one German. The village became the property of the Čáki (Csáky) family in the 19th century, and their Neo-Baroque manor house still exists (currently abandoned). German village had been known under the name Gorgau.

The village, which is renowned for its crafts, contains the picturesque Early Gothic church of St. Simon and St. Jude. There is also a substantial medieval stone bridge, one of the few survivors of its type.

== Geography ==
The municipality lies at an altitude of 469 metres (1,539 ft) and covers an area of 12.22 km^{2} (4.72 sq mi) (2025).

== Population ==
Population statistic (10 years)
| Year | 1995 | 2005 | 2015 | 2025 |
|---|---|---|---|---|
| Count | 872 | 1099 | 1457 | 1934 |
| Difference | | +26.03% | +32.57% | +32.73% |

Population statistic
| Year | 2024 | 2025 |
|---|---|---|
| Count | 1910 | 1934 |
| Difference | | +1.25% |

It has a population of 1934 people (31 December 2025).

=== Ethnicity ===
Census 2021 (1+ %)
| Ethnicity | Number | Fraction |
|---|---|---|
| Slovak | 1627 | 93.34% |
| Not found out | 89 | 5.1% |
| Romani | 45 | 2.58% |
| Rusyn | 27 | 1.54% |
| Total | 1743 | |

In year 2021 was 1743 people by ethnicity 1627 as Slovak, 89 as Not found out, 45 as Romani, 27 as Rusyn, 7 as Czech, 3 as Russian, 3 as Hungarian, 3 as Other, 1 as Romanian, 1 as Polish, 1 as German and 1 as Bulgarian.

Note on population: The difference values of population numbers in the table "Population statistic" and in the sections "Ethnicity" & "Religion" is caused by the use of various statistical methods.

=== Religion ===
Census 2021 (1+ %)
| Religion | Number | Fraction |
|---|---|---|
| Roman Catholic Church | 1312 | 75.27% |
| None | 187 | 10.73% |
| Not found out | 106 | 6.08% |
| Greek Catholic Church | 55 | 3.16% |
| Jehovah's Witnesses | 32 | 1.84% |
| Total | 1743 | |

In year 2021 was 1743 people by religion 1312 from Roman Catholic Church, 187 from None, 106 from Not found out, 55 from Greek Catholic Church, 32 from Jehovah's Witnesses, 17 from Christian Congregations in Slovakia, 16 from Evangelical Church, 7 from Calvinist Church, 3 from Paganism and natural spirituality, 3 from Other and not ascertained christian church, 2 from Eastern Orthodox Church, 2 from Other and 1 from Ad hoc movements.

== Famous people ==
Gyula Tornai (1861–1928), Hungarian painter was born here at the time when Görgő was a town of the Kingdom of Hungary
