= 2011–12 Ligue Magnus season =

2011–12 Ligue Magnus
- League: Ligue Magnus
- Sport: Ice hockey
- Number of teams: 14
- Regular-season winner: Dragons de Rouen
- Playoffs winner: Dragons de Rouen
- Promoted to Division 1: Scorpions de Mulhouse
- Relegated to Division 1: Bisons de Neuilly-sur-Marne

Ligue Magnus seasons
- ← 2010–11 2012–13 →

The 2011–12 Ligue Magnus season was the 91st season of the Ligue Magnus, the top level of ice hockey in France. Fourteen teams participated in the league, and Dragons de Rouen won both the regular season title, and the Coupe Magnus, the postseason championship that earned the team the title "Champions of France". The Scorpions de Mulhouse were elevated to the league from Division 1 at the end of the season, and the Bisons de Neuilly-sur-Marne were relegated to Division 1 after finishing the regular season with only three wins and losing the relegation playoff with the Ours de Villard-de-Lans.

== Rules ==
A win, whether in regulation, overtime, or shootout, is worth two points. A loss in overtime or shootout is worth one point. A loss in regulation is worth zero points. During the regular season, every team plays every other team twice, once at home and once away, for a total of 26 games each. During the playoffs, the top four ranked teams automatically enter the quarterfinals, while the fifth through twelfth ranked teams play a preliminary series to determine the quarterfinalists. All preliminary, quarterfinal, and semifinal series are best of five, while the finals are best of seven.

The bottom two ranked teams at the end of the regular season play a relegation series, best of five games, with the winner remaining in the Ligue Magnus, and the loser being relegated to Division 1. The winner of Division 1 is elevated to the Ligue Magnus at the end of the season.

=== Ranking ===
Teams are ranked by their point score, with ties broken as follows:

1. Points scored in matches between the two teams
2. Number of games lost by forfeit
3. Number of goals scored in regulation between the two teams
4. Goal differential, overall
5. Goal differential in pool play
6. Number of goals in all games in pool play

If there was a tie after these criteria, a playoff would be held on neutral ice.

== Regular season ==
Regular Season
	Team	G	W	OTW	OTL	L	Pts	GF	GA	+/-
1st	Dragons de Rouen	26	18	2	1	5	41	129	75	+54
2nd	Ducs de Dijon	26	15	3	2	6	38	123	71	+52
3rd	Chamois de Chamonix	26	15	3	1	7	37	99	74	+25
4th	Diables Rouges de Briançon	26	13	2	5	6	35	91	78	+13
5th	Ducs d'Angers (Note: Angers is ranked above Morzine due to a 5–4 goal differential over the two games between the teams, each team winning one game.)	26	14	2	2	8	34	75	60	+15
6th	Pingouins de Morzine-Avoriaz	26	14	1	4	7	34	86	69	+17
7th	Brûleurs de Loups de Grenoble	26	14	1	2	9	32	90	75	+15
8th	Gothiques d'Amiens (Note: Amiens is ranked above Strasbourg, due to winning both games played between the teams.)	26	8	5	2	11	28	76	79	−3
9th	Étoile noire de Strasbourg	26	12	1	2	11	28	89	81	+8
10th	Dauphins d'Épinal	26	11	2	0	13	26	93	103	−10
11th	Rapaces de Gap	26	6	3	3	14	21	79	99	−20
12th	Drakkars de Caen	26	4	5	1	16	19	56	111	−55
13th	Ours de Villard-de-Lans	26	4	1	2	19	12	72	129	−53
14th	Bisons de Neuilly-sur-Marne	26	3	0	4	19	10	66	120	−54

== Postseason ==
=== Preliminary round ===
Played 24 February through 3 March

- Gothiques d'Amiens – Étoile noire de Strasbourg 3:2 (2–1, 5–3, 2–4, 2–3, 5–2)
- Brûleurs de Loups de Grenoble – Dauphins d'Épinal 3:2 (5–3, 5–3, 3–4, 6–2, 3–2 OT)
- Ducs d'Angers – Drakkars de Caen 3:0 (6–1, 6–1, 2–1)
- Pingouins de Morzine-Avoriaz – Rapaces de Gap 2:3 (2–3 OT, 6–2, 3–6, 4–3 OT, 4–5 OT)

=== Quarterfinals ===
Played 6 through 13 March

- Dragons de Rouen – Gothiques d'Amiens 3:2 (4–5, 5–3, 1–0 OT, 1–5, 5–3)
- Diables Rouges de Briançon – Ducs d'Angers 1:3 (5–2, 1–4, 2–4, 2–5)
- Ducs de Dijon – Brûleurs de Loups de Grenoble 2:3 (3–0, 3–2, 2–3, 1–2 OT, 2–5)
- Chamois de Chamonix – Rapaces de Gap 3:1 (2–3 OT, 6–2, 3–0, 5–4 OT)

=== Semifinals ===
Played 16 through 24 March

- Dragons de Rouen – Ducs d'Angers 3:1 (2–1, 1–2, 7–1, 3–1)
- Chamois de Chamonix – Brûleurs de Loups de Grenoble 1:3 (3–4 OT, 5–2, 4–7, 1–7)

=== Coupe Magnus Final ===
Played 28 March through 10 April

- Dragons de Rouen – Brûleurs de Loups de Grenoble 4:2 (4–3 OT, 8–2, 4–5, 4–6, 5–1, 4–0)

=== Relegation ===
Played 24 February through 3 March

- Ours de Villard-de-Lans – Bisons de Neuilly-sur-Marne 3:1 (1–0, 7–5, 0–1, 7–2)
