= Tomáš Marcinko =

Slovak ice hockey player (born 1988)

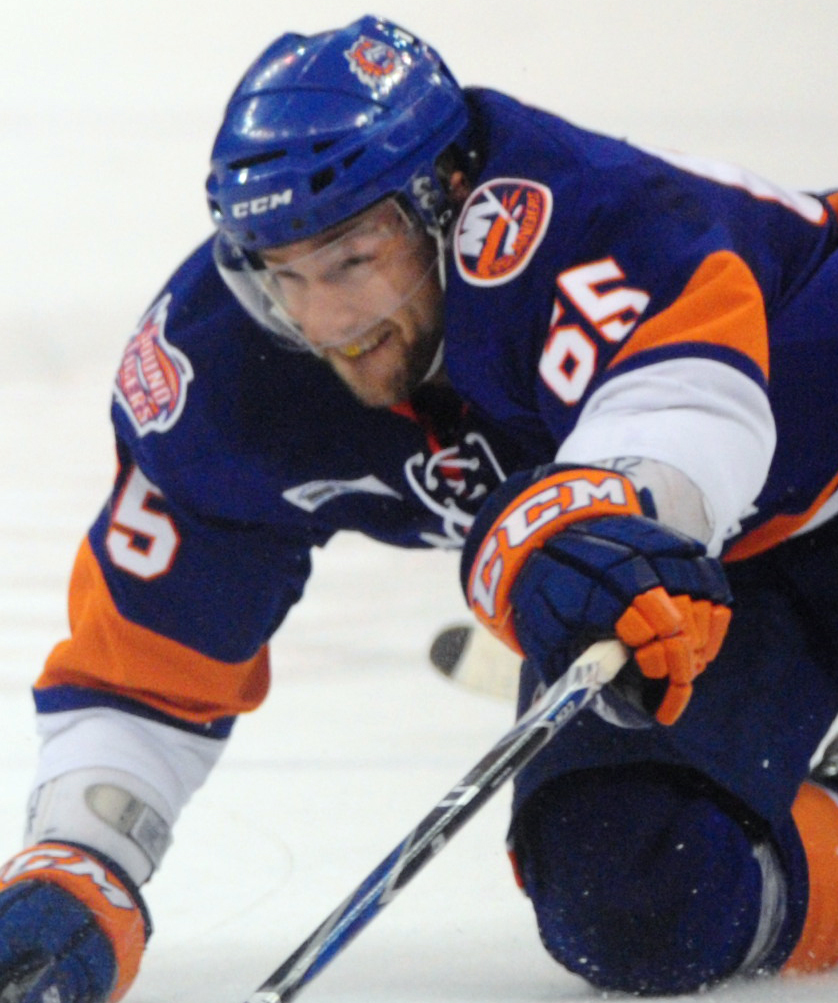
- Marcinko with the Bridgeport Sound Tigers in 2011
- Born: 11 April 1988 (age 38) Poprad, Czechoslovakia
- Height: 6 ft 4 in (193 cm)
- Weight: 207 lb (94 kg; 14 st 11 lb)
- Position: Center
- Shoots: Right
- Slovak Extraliga team Former teams: HC Slovan Bratislava; HC Oceláři Třinec HC Košice; Bridgeport Sound Tigers; Modo Hockey; HC Pardubice; HC Kunlun Red Star
- National team: Slovakia
- NHL draft: 115th overall, 2006; New York Islanders
- Playing career: 2008–present

Tomáš Marcinko (born 11 April 1988) is a Slovak professional ice hockey forward who plays as a center for HC Slovan Bratislava of the Slovak Extraliga. He was selected by the New York Islanders in the 4th round (115th overall) of the 2006 NHL entry draft, but he never played for the team.

On June 26, 2011, the New York Islanders re-signed Marcinko to a one-year, two-way contract.

Since 2019, he has been married to Vladimíra Marcinková, a Member of Slovak parliament. They have two children.

== Career statistics ==
=== Regular season and playoffs ===
			Regular season					Playoffs
Season	Team	League	GP	G	A	Pts	PIM	GP	G	A	Pts	PIM
2003–04	HC Košice	SVK U18	42	19	23	42	60	2	0	0	0	4
2003–04	HC Košice	SVK U20	7	0	2	2	4	3	0	1	1	0
2004–05	HC Košice	SVK U20	38	11	18	29	28	8	1	2	3	6
2004–05	HC Košice	SVK	6	0	0	0	0	—	—	—	—	—
2005–06	HC Košice	SVK U20	35	26	21	47	50	3	1	0	1	4
2005–06	HC Košice	SVK	18	2	0	2	2	5	0	0	0	0
2005–06	HKm Humenné	SVK.2	5	2	2	4	4	4	1	3	4	6
2006–07	Barrie Colts	OHL	56	19	21	40	56	8	0	1	1	8
2007–08	Barrie Colts	OHL	48	19	26	45	54	9	4	3	7	14
2008–09	Bridgeport Sound Tigers	AHL	58	4	7	11	30	4	0	0	0	0
2009–10	Bridgeport Sound Tigers	AHL	54	4	2	6	27	5	0	1	1	2
2010–11	Bridgeport Sound Tigers	AHL	66	4	7	11	56	—	—	—	—	—
2011–12	Bridgeport Sound Tigers	AHL	65	8	13	21	78	2	0	0	0	0
2012–13	Modo Hockey	SEL	4	0	1	1	2	—	—	—	—	—
2012–13	HC Košice	SVK	38	11	20	31	48	17	2	3	5	60
2013–14	HC Košice	SVK	44	10	18	28	58	8	2	1	3	10
2014–15	HC ČSOB Pojišťovna Pardubice	ELH	45	4	9	13	104	9	3	3	6	16
2015–16	HC Dynamo Pardubice	ELH	51	6	21	27	76	—	—	—	—	—
2016–17	Kunlun Red Star	KHL	60	5	13	18	88	5	0	2	2	10
2017–18	HC Oceláři Třinec	ELH	48	14	22	36	80	17	5	1	6	22
2018–19	HC Oceláři Třinec	ELH	51	10	16	26	87	15	2	3	5	14
2019–20	HC Oceláři Třinec	ELH	46	13	19	32	62	—	—	—	—	—
2020–21	HC Oceláři Třinec	ELH	48	12	12	24	70	16	2	0	2	8
2021–22	HC Oceláři Třinec	ELH	44	10	17	27	34	14	2	3	5	12
2022–23	HC Oceláři Třinec	ELH	41	10	21	31	44	20	5	8	13	37
SVK totals			106	23	38	61	108	30	4	4	8	70
AHL totals			243	20	29	49	191	11	0	1	1	2
ELH totals			374	79	137	216	557	91	19	18	37	109

=== International ===
Year	Team	Event	GP	G	A	Pts	PIM
2004	Slovakia	U17	5	5	1	6	2
2005	Slovakia	WJC18	6	1	0	1	4
2005	Slovakia	U18	3	1	1	2	2
2006	Slovakia	WJC18	6	1	2	3	6
2007	Slovakia	WJC	6	1	3	4	16
2008	Slovakia	WJC	6	2	4	6	12
2014	Slovakia	OG	1	0	0	0	2
2014	Slovakia	WC	6	0	0	0	6
2016	Slovakia	WC	7	1	1	2	2
2018	Slovakia	OG	4	0	0	0	2
2018	Slovakia	WC	7	0	0	0	6
Junior totals			32	11	11	22	42
Senior totals			25	1	1	2	18
