= 2014–15 Ligue Magnus season =

French professional ice hockey season

The 2014–15 Ligue Magnus season was the 94th season of the Ligue Magnus, the top level of ice hockey in France. Rapaces de Gap defeated Dauphins d'Épinal in the championship round.

== Regular season ==
	Team	GP	W	L	OTL	GF	GA	Diff	Pts
1.	Brûleurs de Loups de Grenoble	26	18	4	4	94	67	+27	40
2.	Dragons de Rouen	26	19	7	0	121	73	+48	38
3.	Rapaces de Gap	26	18	6	2	88	71	+17	38
4.	Ducs d'Angers	26	17	5	4	97	66	+31	38
5.	Diables Rouges de Briançon	26	16	8	2	94	78	+16	34
6.	Chamois de Chamonix	26	14	7	5	96	85	+11	33
7.	Gothiques d'Amiens	26	14	8	4	100	81	+9	32
8.	Dauphins d'Épinal	26	12	13	1	78	85	-7	25
9.	Étoile noire de Strasbourg	26	11	13	2	74	101	−27	24
10.	Morzine-Avoriaz-Les Gets	26	12	14	0	76	102	−26	23
11.	Ducs de Dijon	26	9	15	2	72	88	−16	20
12.	Brest Albatros Hockey	26	8	14	4	73	98	−25	20
13.	Lyon HC	26	8	15	3	87	115	−28	19
14.	Drakkars de Caen	26	6	14	6	66	106	−40	18
