= 2012–13 Ligue Magnus season =

French professional ice hockey season

The 2012–13 Ligue Magnus season was the 92nd season of the Ligue Magnus, the top level of ice hockey in France. 14 teams participated in the league, and the Dragons de Rouen won the championship. The Scorpions de Mulhouse were relegated to the FFHG Division 1.

== Regular season ==
	Team	GP	W	L	OTL	GF	GA	Diff	Pts
1.	Ducs d'Angers	26	21	2	3	101	54	+47	45
2.	Dragons de Rouen	26	18	7	1	115	75	+40	37
3.	Diables Rouges de Briançon	26	17	6	3	113	71	+42	37
4.	Chamois de Chamonix	26	15	10	1	100	88	+12	31
5.	Ducs de Dijon	26	15	10	1	107	95	+12	31
6.	Gothiques d'Amiens	26	13	9	4	89	77	+12	30
7.	Pingouins de Morzine	26	14	10	2	95	95	0	30
8.	Rapaces de Gap	26	11	9	6	65	79	-14	28
9.	Brûleurs de Loups de Grenoble	26	13	12	1	88	76	+12	27
10.	Ours de Villard-de-Lans	26	12	13	1	83	92	-9	25
11.	Étoile noire de Strasbourg	26	10	14	2	64	102	-38	22
12.	Dauphins d'Épinal	26	9	14	3	94	106	-12	21
13.	Scorpions de Mulhouse	26	7	16	3	69	113	-44	17
14.	Drakkars de Caen	26	7	18	1	74	134	-60	15

== Playoffs ==
1/8 finals
1	Ducs d’Angers
Bye
8	Rapaces de Gap	0
9	Brûleurs de Loups de Grenoble	3
4	Chamois de Chamonix
Bye
5	Ducs de Dijon	2
12	Dauphins d’Épinal	3
2	Dragons de Rouen
Bye
7	Pingouins de Morzine	3
10	Ours de Villard-de-Lans	1
3	Diables Rouges de Briançon
Bye
6	Gothiques d'Amiens	2
11	Étoile noire de Strasbourg	3

Quarterfinals
1	Ducs d’Angers	3
9	Brûleurs de loups de Grenoble	2
4	Chamois de Chamonix	2
12	Dauphins d’Épinal	3
2	Dragons de Rouen	3
7	Pingouins de Morzine	1
3	Diables rouges de Briançon	3
11	Étoile Noire de Strasbourg	1

Semifinals
1	Ducs d’Angers	3
12	Dauphins d’Épinal	1
2	Dragons de Rouen	3
3	Diables rouges de Briançon	1

Final
1	Ducs d’Angers	3
2	Dragons de Rouen	4

== Relegation ==
- Scorpions de Mulhouse - Drakkars de Caen 0:3 (2:3 SO, 1:6, 0:2)
