= Épinal Hockey Club =

- Nickname: Wildcats
- City: Épinal France
- League: FFHG Division 1
- Founded: 1997
- Home arena: Patinoire de Poissompré
- Colours
- President: Anne Mauffrey
- Head coach: Ján Plch
- Affiliate: ICE amateur
- Website: www.epinalhockeyclub.fr

Franchise history
- Wildcats d'Épinal

The Épinal Hockey Club, known as the Wildcats d'Épinal, is a French ice hockey team based in Épinal playing in the FFHG Division 1. The team was formerly known as the Dauphins d'Épinal (Épinal Dolphins), Image Club d'Épinal and Gamyo Épinal for sponsorship reasons when a French video game company, Gamyo, bought the naming rights in 2014. They rename themselves the Wildcats in 2022. The team was founded in 1997 and plays home games at the Patinoire de Poissompré.

On April 19, 2023, they won the title of French champion of FFHG Division 1.

== Alumni ==
(Canada)

- Shawn Allard
- Marc-Andre Crete
- Charles Joly
- Marc Lefebvre

(Czech Republic)

- Tomáš Jelínek
- Tomáš Klouček
- Tomáš Myšička

(Finland)

- Jan Hagelberg
- Tomi Karlsson
- Simo Romo
- Ilpo Salmivirta

(France)

- Guillaume Chassard
- Tarik Chipaux
- Franck Constantin
- Sebastien Geoffroy
- Stephane Gervais
- César Lefranc
- Luc Mazerolle
- Guillaume Papelier
- Anthony Pernot
- Lionel Simon

(Slovakia)

- Jan Plch
- Jan Simko
- Peter Listiak
- Stanislav Petrik
- Michal Petrak
- Radoslav Regenda
- Peter Slovak

(Serbia)

- Borislav Ilic

(United States)

- John Paulson
- Preston Ames

== Logos ==
Former logo (2009-2014).

Former logo.
