= 2016 IIHF World Championship Group A =

Ice hockey tournament group stage

Group A was one of two groups of the 2016 IIHF World Championship. The four best placed teams advanced to the playoff round, while the last placed team was relegated to Division I in 2017.

== Standings ==
Pos	Team	Pld	W	OTW	OTL	L	GF	GA	GD	Pts	Qualification or relegation
1	Czech Republic	7	5	1	1	0	27	12	+15	18 (Note: Czech Republic 3–0 Russia)	Playoff round
2	Russia (H)	7	6	0	0	1	32	10	+22	18	Playoff round
3	Sweden	7	3	2	0	2	23	18	+5	13	Playoff round
4	Denmark	7	2	2	1	2	17	22	−5	11	Playoff round
5	Norway	7	2	1	0	4	13	22	−9	8 (Note: Norway 4–3 (OT) Switzerland)	
6	Switzerland	7	1	1	3	2	20	26	−6	8	
7	Latvia	7	1	0	3	3	13	22	−9	6	
8	Kazakhstan (R)	7	0	1	0	6	15	28	−13	2	Relegation to Division I A (Note: The rules state that "the bottom ranked two teams will be relegated" and the 2017 hosts (France and Germany) cannot be relegated by rule.)

Source: IIHF
Rules for classification: 1) points; 2) head-to-head points; 3) head-to-head goal difference; 4) head-to-head number of goals scored; 5) result against closest best-ranked team outside tied teams; 6) result against second-best ranked team outside tied teams; 7) seeding before tournament.
(H) Host; (R) Relegated
Notes:

All times are local (UTC+3).

== Matches ==
=== Sweden vs Latvia ===
6 May 2016; 16:15	Sweden	2–1 OT (1–0, 0–0, 0–1); OT (1–0)	Latvia	VTB Ice Palace, Moscow; Attendance: 4,420

Game reference

Jacob Markström
Goalies
Elvis Merzļikins
Referees:
(Finland) Stefan Fonselius
(Belarus) Maxim Sidorenko
Linesmen:
(United States) Fraser McIntyre
(Russia) Alexander Otmakhov

Ericsson (Backlund, Fransson) – 02:52	1–0
	1–1	52:29 – Sotnieks (Rēdlihs, Džeriņš) (PP)
Nyquist (Wennberg) – 64:06	2–1

10 min
Penalties
10 min
44
Shots
21

=== Czech Republic vs Russia ===
6 May 2016; 20:15	Czech Republic	3–0 (1–0, 1–0, 1–0)	Russia	VTB Ice Palace, Moscow; Attendance: 9,696

Game reference

Dominik Furch
Goalies
Sergei Bobrovsky
Referees:
(Germany) Daniel Piechaczek
(Switzerland) Tobias Wehrli
Linesmen:
(Finland) Pasi Nieminen
(Sweden) Henrik Pihlblad

Kundrátek (Kovář, Kempný) – 14:48	1–0
Červenka (Jeřábek, Pastrňák) (PP) – 20:48	2–0
Birner (ENG) – 58:28	3–0

10 min
Penalties
10 min
27
Shots
25

=== Switzerland vs Kazakhstan ===
7 May 2016; 12:15	Switzerland	2–3 GWS (1–0, 0–1, 1–1); OT (0–0); GWS (0–1)	Kazakhstan	VTB Ice Palace, Moscow; Attendance: 5,420

Game reference

Reto Berra
Goalies
Vitali Kolesnik
Referees:
(Russia) Roman Gofman
(Canada) Brett Iverson
Linesmen:
(Canada) Nicolas Chartrand-Piche
(Czech Republic) Vit Lederer

Walser (Diaz, Andrighetto) – 14:56	1–0
	1–1	30:57 – Savchenko (SH)
	1–2	50:30 – Starchenko (Rymarev) (PP)
Hollenstein (Ambühl, Du Bois) (PP) – 52:01	2–2

Hollenstein
Martschini
Niederreiter (miss)
Martschini (miss)
Shootout
Dawes
Starchenko
(miss) Rymarev
Dawes
6 min
Penalties
8 min
51
Shots
27

=== Norway vs Denmark ===
7 May 2016; 16:15	Norway	0–3 (0–0, 0–2, 0–1)	Denmark	VTB Ice Palace, Moscow; Attendance: 6,668

Game reference

Lars Haugen
Goalies
Sebastian Dahm
Referees:
(Finland) Stefan Fonselius
(Switzerland) Tobias Wehrli
Linesmen:
(Sweden) Henrik Pihlblad
(Slovakia) Peter Sefcik

0–1	21:06 – Nick. Jensen (Storm, Madsen)
0–2	34:12 – J. Jensen (Eller, D. Nielsen)
0–3	59:45 – Nick. Jensen (D. Nielsen) (ENG)

4 min
Penalties
16 min
44
Shots
28

=== Latvia vs Czech Republic ===
7 May 2016; 20:15	Latvia	3–4 GWS (0–2, 1–0, 2–1); OT (0–0); GWS (0–1)	Czech Republic	VTB Ice Palace, Moscow; Attendance: 4,650

Game reference

Edgars Masaļskis
Goalies
Pavel Francouz
Referees:
(Slovakia) Jozef Kubuš
(Finland) Aleksi Rantala
Linesmen:
(Russia) Alexander Otmakhov
(Germany) Nikolaj Ponomarjow

	0–1	03:33 – Plekanec (Pastrňák, Červenka)
	0–2	06:23 – Plekanec (Kašpar, Červenka) (PP)
Bukarts (Džeriņš, Rēdlihs) – 35:26	1–2
Girgensons (Ābols, Daugaviņš) (PP) – 48:20	2–2
Rēdlihs (Džeriņš, Bukarts) – 57:41	3–2
	3–3	59:01 – Řepík (Jeřábek, Kovář) (EA)

Ābols (miss)
Daugaviņš (miss)
Bukarts (miss)
Shootout
Kašpar
(miss) Kovář
(miss) Koukal
31 min
Penalties
8 min
25
Shots
39

=== Kazakhstan vs Russia ===
8 May 2016; 12:15	Kazakhstan	4–6 (3–3, 0–1, 1–2)	Russia	VTB Ice Palace, Moscow; Attendance: 10,122

Game reference

Vitali Kolesnik
Goalies
Sergei Bobrovsky
Referees:
(Slovakia) Jozef Kubuš
(Belarus) Maxim Sidorenko
Linesmen:
(Czech Republic) Vit Lederer
(Slovakia) Peter Šefčík

	0–1	06:43 – Dadonov (Shipachyov, Belov)
Boyd (Bochenski, Dawes) (PP) – 08:04	1–1
Starchenko (Khudyakov, Rymarev) – 09:02	2–1
	2–2	09:21 – Lyubimov (Kalinin, Plotnikov)
	2–3	11:11 – Mozyakin (Dadonov, Shipachyov) (PP2)
Rymarev (Starchenko) (PP) – 19:46	3–3
	3–4	38:02 – Belov (Datsyuk, Antipin) (PP)
Semyonov (Boyd, Dawes) (PP) – 41:00	4–4
	4–5	43:57 – Belov (Chudinov, Mozyakin)
	4–6	48:38 – Lyubimov (Belov, Datsyuk) (PP)

10 min
Penalties
8 min
19
Shots
49

=== Norway vs Switzerland ===
8 May 2016; 16:15	Norway	4–3 OT (1–1, 2–0, 0–2); OT (1–0)	Switzerland	VTB Ice Palace, Moscow; Attendance: 4,515

Game reference

Lars Volden
Goalies
Robert Mayer
Referees:
(Germany) Daniel Piechaczek
(Finland) Aleksi Rantala
Linesmen:
(United States) Fraser McIntyre
(Germany) Nikolaj Ponomarjow

	0–1	02:27 – Walser (Weber, Martschini) (PP)
K. Olimb (M. Olimb, Zuccarello) (EA) – 14:07	1–1
Røymark (Forsberg) – 23:03	2–1
M. Olimb (K. Olimb, Olsen) (PP) – 38:03	3–1
	3–2	43:24 – Moser (Diaz, Niederreiter)
	3–3	59:50 – Du Bois (Diaz, Ambühl) (EA)
Martinsen (M. Olimb, Trygg) (PP) – 63:23	4–3

8 min
Penalties
6 min
26
Shots
39

=== Sweden vs Denmark ===
8 May 2016; 20:15	Sweden	5–2 (0–1, 4–0, 1–1)	Denmark	VTB Ice Palace, Moscow; Attendance: 5,385

Game reference

Viktor Fasth
Goalies
Sebastian Dahm
Referees:
(Russia) Roman Gofman
(Canada) Brett Iverson
Linesmen:
(Canada) Nicolas Chartrand-Piche
(Finland) Pasi Nieminen

	0–1	15:05 – Ehlers (J. Jensen, Eller) (PP)
Rosén (Fantenberg, Ritola) – 27:03	1–1
Backlund (Ericsson, Omark) (PP) – 28:30	2–1
Nygren (Omark, Sundström) (PP2) – 37:06	3–1
Backlund (Ericsson, Omark) (PP) – 39:00	4–1
Nyquist (PP) – 49:35	5–1
	5–2	59:54 – J. Jensen (Bjorkstrand, Christensen)

10 min
Penalties
16 min
42
Shots
25

=== Latvia vs Russia ===
9 May 2016; 16:15	Latvia	0–4 (0–0, 0–2, 0–2)	Russia	VTB Ice Palace, Moscow; Attendance: 10,440

Game reference

Elvis Merzļikins
Goalies
Sergei Bobrovsky
Referees:
(Finland) Stefan Fonselius
(Switzerland) Tobias Wehrli
Linesmen:
(Finland) Pasi Nieminen
(Sweden) Henrik Pihlblad

0–1	20:29 – Panarin (Datsyuk)
0–2	27:34 – Dadonov (Shipachyov, Panarin)
0–3	47:02 – Shipachyov (Panarin, Dadonov)
0–4	57:30 – Panarin (Chudinov, Shipachyov) (PP)

8 min
Penalties
35 min
27
Shots
37

=== Sweden vs Czech Republic ===
9 May 2016; 20:15	Sweden	2–4 (2–0, 0–3, 0–1)	Czech Republic	VTB Ice Palace, Moscow; Attendance: 7,780

Game reference

Jacob Markström
Goalies
Pavel Francouz
Referees:
(Germany) Daniel Piechaczek
(Belarus) Maxim Sidorenko
Linesmen:
(United States) Fraser McIntyre
(Russia) Alexander Otmakhov

Rosén (Gustafsson, Wennberg) (PP) – 09:15	1–0
Lundberg (Sjögren) (SH) – 19:52	2–0
	2–1	26:45 – Pastrňák (Červenka, Jeřábek)
	2–2	33:38 – Kovář (Jeřábek, Birner)
	2–3	37:59 – Birner (SH)
	2–4	54:32 – Birner

4 min
Penalties
6 min
28
Shots
33

=== Switzerland vs Denmark ===
10 May 2016; 16:15	Switzerland	3–2 OT (0–2, 0–0, 2–0); OT (1–0)	Denmark	VTB Ice Palace, Moscow; Attendance: 5,962

Game reference

Reto Berra
Robert Mayer
Goalies
Sebastian Dahm
Referees:
(Czech Republic) Antonín Jeřábek
(Russia) Konstantin Olenin
Linesmen:
(Canada) Nicolas Chartrand-Piche
(Russia) Alexander Otmakhov

	0–1	07:08 – Storm (Nielsen, Nick. Jensen) (PP)
	0–2	18:54 – Ehlers (Eller, Hansen) (PP)
Weber (Moser, Niederreiter) – 49:42	1–2
Niederreiter (Moser, Diaz) – 57:58	2–2
Blum (Ambühl) – 64:08	3–2

16 min
Penalties
12 min
42
Shots
28

=== Kazakhstan vs Norway ===
10 May 2016; 20:15	Kazakhstan	2–4 (1–1, 1–2, 0–1)	Norway	VTB Ice Palace, Moscow; Attendance: 7,384

Game reference

Vitali Kolesnik
Goalies
Lars Haugen
Referees:
(United States) Timothy Mayer
(Sweden) Linus Ohlund
Linesmen:
(Sweden) Henrik Pihlblad
(Germany) Nikolaj Ponomarjow

	0–1	03:24 – Johannessen (Forsberg)
Dawes (Boyd, Semyonov) (PP) – 07:00	1–1
	1–2	33:04 – K. Olimb (Olsen, Nørstebø)
Bochenski (Savchenko, Dawes) (PP) – 35:47	2–2
	2–3	38:17 – M. Olimb (K. Olimb, Holøs)
	2–4	57:37 – Zuccarello (Haugen) (ENG)

18 min
Penalties
12 min
19
Shots
43

=== Switzerland vs Latvia ===
11 May 2016; 16:15	Switzerland	5–4 (0–0, 3–3, 2–1)	Latvia	VTB Ice Palace, Moscow; Attendance: 5,692

Game reference

Reto Berra
Goalies
Edgars Masaļskis
Referees:
(United States) Timothy Mayer
(Belarus) Maxim Sidorenko
Linesmen:
(Czech Republic) Vit Lederer
(Finland) Pasi Nieminen

Niederreiter (Andrighetto, Diaz) (PP) – 23:33	1–0
Niederreiter (Du Bois, Diaz) (PP) – 26:06	2–0
Hofmann (Andrighetto, Schäppi) – 28:30	3–0
	3–1	33:24 – Rēdlihs (Sotnieks, Cibuļskis) (PP)
	3–2	37:23 – Rēdlihs (Sotnieks, Cibuļskis) (PP)
	3–3	38:36 – Ķēniņš
Andrighetto (Geering) – 45:56	4–3
	4–4	46:22 – A. Širokovs (Galviņš, Daugaviņš)
Blum – 58:31	5–4

10 min
Penalties
22 min
31
Shots
17

=== Sweden vs Kazakhstan ===
11 May 2016; 20:15	Sweden	7–3 (3–1, 3–0, 1–2)	Kazakhstan	VTB Ice Palace, Moscow; Attendance: 8,729

Game reference

Viktor Fasth
Goalies
Vitali Kolesnik
Pavel Poluektov
Referees:
(Czech Republic) Antonín Jeřábek
(Russia) Konstantin Olenin
Linesmen:
(United States) Fraser McIntyre
(Slovakia) Peter Šefčík

Backlund (Omark, Fantenberg) – 12:20	1–0
Klasen (Nyquist, Wennberg) – 15:11	2–0
Larsson (Norman) – 16:15	3–0
	3–1	19:59 – Boyd (Dawes) (PP)
Nyquist (Wennberg, Klasen) (PP) – 24:25	4–1
Nyquist (Omark, Ericsson) – 28:51	5–1
Wennberg (SH) – 30:42	6–1
	6–2	46:49 – Markelov (Pushkaryov, Solaryov)
	6–3	47:57 – Savchenko (Rymarev, Poluektov)
Nyquist (Fransson, Wennberg) (SH) – 54:02	7–3

14 min
Penalties
8 min
46
Shots
26

=== Czech Republic vs Norway ===
12 May 2016; 16:15	Czech Republic	7–0 (3–0, 4–0, 0–0)	Norway	VTB Ice Palace, Moscow; Attendance: 5,124

Game reference

Dominik Furch
Goalies
Lars Volden
Lars Haugen
Referees:
(Sweden) Tobias Björk
(Switzerland) Marc Wiegand
Linesmen:
(Canada) Nicolas Chartrand-Piche
(Germany) Nikolaj Ponomarjow

Červenka (Pastrňák, Kundrátek) – 05:11	1–0
Zohorna – 09:33	2–0
Kousal – 19:45	3–0
Kašpar (Kundrátek) – 22:10	4–0
Šimek (Birner) – 28:37	5–0
Řepík (Jeřábek, Kovář) – 34:53	6–0
Kašpar (Zohorna, Doudera) (PP) – 39:09	7–0

20 min
Penalties
12 min
33
Shots
26

=== Russia vs Denmark ===
12 May 2016; 20:15	Russia	10–1 (3–0, 4–1, 3–0)	Denmark	VTB Ice Palace, Moscow; Attendance: 11,022

Game reference

Sergei Bobrovsky
Ilya Sorokin
Goalies
Simon Nielsen
Referees:
(Czech Republic) Martin Fraňo
(Sweden) Linus Ohlund
Linesmen:
(Czech Republic) Vit Lederer
(Sweden) Henrik Pihlblad

Marchenko (Dadonov, Zaitsev) – 02:38	1–0
Chudinov (Shipachyov, Panarin) (PP) – 12:45	2–0
Zaitsev (Burmistrov) – 13:06	3–0
	3–1	29:56 – Hansen (Ehlers, Eller)
Mozyakin (Datsyuk, Lyubimov) (PP) – 30:43	4–1
Mozyakin (Datsyuk, Belov) – 33:42	5–1
Shirokov (Voinov) – 33:52	6–1
Dadonov (Shipachyov, Panarin) – 37:37	7–1
Shipachyov (Dadonov, Panarin) (PP) – 41:50	8–1
Shipachyov (Panarin, Dadonov) – 44:38	9–1
Panarin (Voinov, Shipachyov) (PP) – 55:31	10–1

6 min
Penalties
16 min
41
Shots
17

=== Czech Republic vs Kazakhstan ===
13 May 2016; 16:15	Czech Republic	3–1 (1–0, 0–0, 2–1)	Kazakhstan	VTB Ice Palace, Moscow; Attendance: 8,234

Game reference

Pavel Francouz
Goalies
Vitali Kolesnik
Referees:
(Hungary) Péter Gebei
(United States) Timothy Mayer
Linesmen:
(Switzerland) Roman Kaderli
(United States) Judson Ritter

Plekanec (Pastrňák, Červenka) – 06:55	1–0
Plekanec (Pastrňák) – 42:51	2–0
	2–1	55:30 – Dawes (Boyd, Tryasunov)
Kousal (Jordán, Řepík) (ENG) – 58:51	3–1

8 min
Penalties
6 min
36
Shots
20

=== Denmark vs Latvia ===
13 May 2016; 20:15	Denmark	3–2 GWS (1–1, 1–1, 0–0); OT (0–0); GWS (1–0)	Latvia	VTB Ice Palace, Moscow; Attendance: 7,788

Game reference

Sebastian Dahm
Goalies
Elvis Merzļikins
Referees:
(Sweden) Linus Ohlund
(Switzerland) Marc Wiegand
Linesmen:
(United States) Fraser McIntyre
(Russia) Alexander Otmakhov

Nick. Jensen (Madsen, Green) (PP) – 11:57	1–0
	1–1	17:45 – Džeriņš (Bukarts, Cibuļskis) (PP)
	1–2	21:57 – Daugaviņš (Bukarts, Džeriņš) (PP)
Poulsen (Bødker, Christensen) – 28:28	2–2

Eller
Ehlers (miss)
Nick. Jensen
Shootout
(miss) Džeriņš
Indrašis
(miss) Daugaviņš
10 min
Penalties
33 min
36
Shots
32

=== Norway vs Sweden ===
14 May 2016; 12:15	Norway	2–3 (0–0, 0–1, 2–2)	Sweden	VTB Ice Palace, Moscow; Attendance: 6,221

Game reference

Lars Haugen
Goalies
Jacob Markström
Referees:
(Hungary) Péter Gebei
(United States) Timothy Mayer
Linesmen:
(Russia) Alexander Otmakhov
(Germany) Nikolaj Ponomarjow

	0–1	20:56 – Nyquist
	0–2	42:43 – Lundberg (Fransson, Sjögren) (SH)
Olsen (M. Olimb, Johannessen) – 43:41	1–2
	1–3	51:47 – Rosén (Gustafsson, Wennberg) (PP)
Martinsen (Holøs, M. Olimb) (EA) – 58:02	2–3

12 min
Penalties
10 min
25
Shots
35

=== Russia vs Switzerland ===
14 May 2016; 16:15	Russia	5–1 (1–0, 1–0, 3–1)	Switzerland	VTB Ice Palace, Moscow; Attendance: 11,222

Game reference

Sergei Bobrovsky
Ilya Sorokin
Goalies
Reto Berra
Referees:
(Czech Republic) Antonín Jeřábek
(Finland) Aleksi Rantala
Linesmen:
(United States) Fraser McIntyre
(Slovakia) Peter Šefčík

Telegin (Lyubimov) – 05:13	1–0
Kuznetsov (Ovechkin) – 28:40	2–0
Telegin (Lyubimov) – 48:50	3–0
Shirokov (Zaitsev) – 55:20	4–0
	4–1	58:44 – Moser (Weber, Niederreiter)
Mozyakin (Datsyuk, Sannikov) – 59:43	5–1

6 min
Penalties
26 min
38
Shots
35

=== Kazakhstan vs Latvia ===
14 May 2016; 20:15	Kazakhstan	1–2 (1–0, 0–1, 0–1)	Latvia	VTB Ice Palace, Moscow; Attendance: 7,305

Game reference

Vitali Kolesnik
Goalies
Elvis Merzļikins
Referees:
(Sweden) Tobias Björk
(Czech Republic) Martin Fraňo
Linesmen:
(Canada) Nicolas Chartrand-Piche
(Czech Republic) Vit Lederer

Ivanov – 04:37	1–0
	1–1	35:14 – Daugaviņš
	1–2	54:49 – Bičevskis (Indrašis, Cibuļskis)

10 min
Penalties
4 min
20
Shots
38

=== Denmark vs Czech Republic ===
15 May 2016; 16:15	Denmark	2–1 GWS (0–0, 0–1, 1–0); OT (0–0); GWS (1–0)	Czech Republic	VTB Ice Palace, Moscow; Attendance: 8,107

Game reference
Sebastian Dahm	Goalies	Dominik Furch	Referees: (Sweden) Tobias Björk (Finland) Aleksi Rantala; Linesmen: (Canada) Nicolas Chartrand-Piché (Sweden) Henrik Pihlblad
/ 0–1 / 24:09 – Plekanec (Červenka); Madsen (Storm, Nick. Jensen) (PP) – 43:10 / 1–1			Referees: (Sweden) Tobias Björk (Finland) Aleksi Rantala; Linesmen: (Canada) Nicolas Chartrand-Piché (Sweden) Henrik Pihlblad
Eller; Ehlers; Nick. Jensen	Shootout	Kašpar; (miss) Řepík	Referees: (Sweden) Tobias Björk (Finland) Aleksi Rantala; Linesmen: (Canada) Nicolas Chartrand-Piché (Sweden) Henrik Pihlblad
2 min	Penalties	19 min	Referees: (Sweden) Tobias Björk (Finland) Aleksi Rantala; Linesmen: (Canada) Nicolas Chartrand-Piché (Sweden) Henrik Pihlblad
21	Shots	41	Referees: (Sweden) Tobias Björk (Finland) Aleksi Rantala; Linesmen: (Canada) Nicolas Chartrand-Piché (Sweden) Henrik Pihlblad

=== Switzerland vs Sweden ===
15 May 2016; 20:15	Switzerland	2–3 GWS (1–0, 0–1, 1–1); OT (0–0); GWS (0–1)	Sweden	VTB Ice Palace, Moscow; Attendance: 8,214

Game reference

Reto Berra
Goalies
Jacob Markström
Referees:
(Finland) Stefan Fonselius
(Canada) Brett Iverson
Linesmen:
(Finland) Pasi Nieminen
(Germany) Nikolaj Ponomarjow

Andrighetto (Schneeberger) – 18:21	1–0
	1–1	31:12 – Sundström (Omark, Nygren) (PP)
Hollenstein (Blum, Ambühl) (PP) – 44:58	2–1
	2–2	50:02 – Nyquist (Larsson, Rosén) (PP)

Hollenstein (miss)
Andrighetto (miss)
Niederreiter
Niederreiter (miss)
Shootout
Burakovsky
(miss) Klasen
(miss) Omark
Burakovsky
18 min
Penalties
16 min
29
Shots
36

=== Russia vs Norway ===
16 May 2016; 16:15	Russia	3–0 (0–0, 2–0, 1–0)	Norway	VTB Ice Palace, Moscow; Attendance: 12,116

Game reference

Ilya Sorokin
Goalies
Steffen Søberg
Referees:
(Sweden) Tobias Björk
(Germany) Daniel Piechaczek
Linesmen:
(Finland) Pasi Nieminen
(Sweden) Henrik Pihlblad

Telegin (Orlov, Kalinin) – 22:09	1–0
Panarin (Shipachyov) – 37:52	2–0
Lyubimov (Emelin, Orlov) – 42:31	3–0

6 min
Penalties
8 min
28
Shots
27

=== Denmark vs Kazakhstan ===
16 May 2016; 20:15	Denmark	4–1 (3–0, 1–1, 0–0)	Kazakhstan	VTB Ice Palace, Moscow; Attendance: 7,097

Game reference

Sebastian Dahm
Goalies
Pavel Poluektov
Dmitri Malgin
Referees:
(Hungary) Péter Gebei
(Slovakia) Jozef Kubuš
Linesmen:
(Czech Republic) Vit Lederer
(Slovakia) Peter Šefčík

Lauridsen (Eller, Hansen) (PP) – 08:56	1–0
Hansen (Storm) (PP) – 16:46	2–0
Nick. Jensen (Storm) (PP) – 17:50	3–0
	3–1	23:57 – Dawes (Bochenski, Lipin)
Ehlers (Lauridsen) (PP) – 29:53	4–1

2 min
Penalties
12 min
36
Shots
19

=== Czech Republic vs Switzerland ===
17 May 2016; 12:15	Czech Republic	5–4 (1–0, 1–1, 3–3)	Switzerland	VTB Ice Palace, Moscow; Attendance: 7,101

Game reference

Pavel Francouz
Goalies
Reto Berra
Referees:
(Sweden) Tobias Björk
(Germany) Daniel Piechaczek
Linesmen:
(Russia) Alexander Otmakhov
(Slovakia) Peter Šefčík

Birner (Kempný, Řepík) (PP) – 17:00	1–0
	1–1	11:36 – Hollenstein (Andrighetto, Schäppi)
Kašpar (PS) – 24:50	2–1
Zaťovič – 41:45	3–1
	3–2	45:38 – Moser (Du Bois, Trachsler) (PP)
Zohorna (Kousal, Kolář) – 49:59	4–2
Jordán (SH, ENG) – 54:15	5–2
	5–3	55:42 – Schneeberger (Moser, Hofmann)
	5–4	59:34 – Andrighetto (Hollenstein) (EA)

6 min
Penalties
8 min
31
Shots
23

=== Latvia vs Norway ===
17 May 2016; 16:15	Latvia	1–3 (1–1, 0–2, 0–0)	Norway	VTB Ice Palace, Moscow; Attendance: 6,037

Game reference

Elvis Merzļikins
Edgars Masaļskis
Goalies
Steffen Søberg
Referees:
(Hungary) Péter Gebei
(United States) Timothy Mayer
Linesmen:
(Czech Republic) Vit Lederer
(Germany) Nikolaj Ponomarjow

Indrašis (Galviņš) (PP) – 11:42	1–0
	1–1	16:12 – K. Olimb (Olsen)
	1–2	20:40 – Holøs (Martinsen, Zuccarello)
	1–3	20:56 – Johannessen

6 min
Penalties
26 min
24
Shots
26

=== Russia vs Sweden ===
17 May 2016; 20:15	Russia	4–1 (2–0, 2–0, 0–1)	Sweden	VTB Ice Palace, Moscow; Attendance: 12,181

Game reference

Sergei Bobrovsky
Goalies
Jacob Markström
Referees:
(Slovakia) Jozef Kubuš
(Finland) Aleksi Rantala
Linesmen:
(Canada) Nicolas Chartrand-Piché
(United States) Fraser McIntyre

Dadonov (Panarin, Shipachyov) – 14:43	1–0
Panarin (Shipachyov, Marchenko) – 17:52	2–0
Datsyuk (Zaitsev) – 21:34	3–0
Lyubimov (Mozyakin, Datsyuk) – 29:40	4–0
	4–1	41:08 – Ekholm (Larsson, Wennberg) (PP)

4 min
Penalties
8 min
40
Shots
37
