= 2016 IIHF World Championship playoff round =

The playoff round of the 2016 IIHF World Championship was held from 19 to 22 May 2016. The top four of each preliminary group qualified for the playoff round.

== Qualified teams ==
| Group | Winners | Runners-up | Third place | Fourth place |
|---|---|---|---|---|
| A | Czech Republic | Russia | Sweden | Denmark |
| B | Finland | Canada | Germany | United States |

== Bracket ==
Quarterfinals
A1 | Czech Republic | 1
B4 | United States (GWS) | 2
B2 | Canada | 6
A3 | Sweden | 0
B1 | Finland | 5
A4 | Denmark | 1
A2 | Russia | 4
B3 | Germany | 1

Semifinals
B2 | Canada | 4
B4 | United States | 3
B1 | Finland | 3
A2 | Russia | 1

Finals
B1 | Finland | 0
B2 | Canada | 2
Bronze medal game
A2 | Russia | 7
B4 | United States | 2

All times are local (UTC+3).

== Quarterfinals ==
| 19 May 2016; 16:15 | Czech Republic | 1–2 GWS (1–0, 0–1, 0–0); OT (0–0); GWS (0–1) | United States | VTB Ice Palace, Moscow; Attendance: 7,853 |

Game reference
| Dominik Furch | Goalies | Keith Kinkaid | Referees: (Sweden) Linus Ohlund (Switzerland) Tobias Wehrli; Linesmen: (Russia) Alexander Otmakhov (Sweden) Henrik Pihlblad |
| Zohorna (PS) – 15:23 / 1–0; / 1–1 / 21:27 – Matthews (Vatrano, Wideman) | | | Referees: (Sweden) Linus Ohlund (Switzerland) Tobias Wehrli; Linesmen: (Russia) Alexander Otmakhov (Sweden) Henrik Pihlblad |
| Kašpar (miss); Koukal (miss); Zohorna (miss) | Shootout | (miss) Hendricks; Matthews | Referees: (Sweden) Linus Ohlund (Switzerland) Tobias Wehrli; Linesmen: (Russia) Alexander Otmakhov (Sweden) Henrik Pihlblad |
| 12 min | Penalties | 12 min | Referees: (Sweden) Linus Ohlund (Switzerland) Tobias Wehrli; Linesmen: (Russia) Alexander Otmakhov (Sweden) Henrik Pihlblad |
| 32 | Shots | 28 | Referees: (Sweden) Linus Ohlund (Switzerland) Tobias Wehrli; Linesmen: (Russia) Alexander Otmakhov (Sweden) Henrik Pihlblad |

| 19 May 2016; 16:15 | Finland | 5–1 (1–0, 2–1, 2–0) | Denmark | Yubileyny Sports Palace, Saint Petersburg; Attendance: 5,038 |

Game reference

Mikko Koskinen
Goalies
Sebastian Dahm
Referees:
(Czech Republic) Martin Fraňo
(Slovakia) Jozef Kubuš
Linesmen:
(Switzerland) Nicolas Fluri
(Russia) Gleb Lazarev

| Granlund (Koivu, Komarov) – 14:29 | 1–0 |
| Koskiranta (Pyörälä, Ohtamaa) – 21:45 | 2–0 |
| | 2–1 | 31:42 – Eller (Christensen, Ehlers) (PP) |
| Laine (Hietanen, Jaakola) – 38:57 | 3–1 |
| Jokinen (Koivu) (EN) – 57:46 | 4–1 |
| Granlund – 58:07 | 5–1 |

6 min
Penalties
6 min
28
Shots
17

| 19 May 2016; 20:15 | Russia | 4–1 (0–1, 3–0, 1–0) | Germany | VTB Ice Palace, Moscow; Attendance: 12,199 |

Game reference

Sergei Bobrovsky
Goalies
Thomas Greiss
Referees:
(Sweden) Tobias Björk
(Finland) Aleksi Rantala
Linesmen:
(Czech Republic) Miroslav Lhotský
(United States) Fraser McIntyre

| | 0–1 | 04:45 – Reimer |
| Shipachyov (Dadonov, Belov) – 20:40 | 1–1 |
| Dadonov (Shipachyov) – 27:17 | 2–1 |
| Shipachyov (Telegin) – 34:14 | 3–1 |
| Ovechkin (Kuznetsov, Lyubimov) – 42:45 | 4–1 |

2 min
Penalties
4 min
37
Shots
20

| 19 May 2016; 20:15 | Canada | 6–0 (1–0, 3–0, 2–0) | Sweden | Yubileyny Sports Palace, Saint Petersburg; Attendance: 6,090 |

Game reference

Cam Talbot
Goalies
Jacob Markström
Referees:
(Russia) Roman Gofman
(Belarus) Maxim Sidorenko
Linesmen:
(United States) Judson Ritter
(Finland) Sakari Suominen

| Scheifele (O'Reilly, Stone) – 18:39 | 1–0 |
| Dumba (Stone, Scheifele) (PP) – 26:05 | 2–0 |
| Marchand (Dumba, Scheifele) – 32:02 | 3–0 |
| Domi (Reinhart, Matheson) – 32:13 | 4–0 |
| Stone – 51:05 | 5–0 |
| Brassard (Gallagher, Hall) – 53:22 | 6–0 |

10 min
Penalties
18 min
34
Shots
24

== Semifinals ==
| 21 May 2016; 16:15 | Finland | 3–1 (0–1, 3–0, 0–0) | Russia | VTB Ice Palace, Moscow; Attendance: 12,215 |

Game reference

Mikko Koskinen
Goalies
Sergei Bobrovsky
Referees:
(Czech Republic) Martin Fraňo
(Slovakia) Jozef Kubuš
Linesmen:
(United States) Fraser McIntyre
(United States) Judson Ritter

| | 0–1 | 02:52 – Shirokov (Telegin, Marchenko) |
| Aho (Granlund, Lindell) (PP) – 25:34 | 1–1 |
| Jokinen (Laine) – 35:50 | 2–1 |
| Aho (Koskiranta, Koivu) (PP) – 38:15 | 3–1 |

10 min
Penalties
8 min
16
Shots
29

| 21 May 2016; 20:15 | Canada | 4–3 (2–0, 1–3, 1–0) | United States | VTB Ice Palace, Moscow; Attendance: 10,455 |

Game reference

Cam Talbot
Goalies
Keith Kinkaid
Referees:
(Russia) Roman Gofman
(Switzerland) Tobias Wehrli
Linesmen:
(Czech Republic) Miroslav Lhotský
(Russia) Alexander Otmakhov

| Gallagher (Jenner, Reinhart) – 08:59 | 1–0 |
| Marchand (Ceci) – 18:02 | 2–0 |
| | 2–1 | 21:14 – Matthews (Wideman, Larkin) (PP) |
| | 2–2 | 23:57 – Warsofsky (Nelson, Fasching) |
| | 2–3 | 28:25 – Motte (Larkin, Compher) |
| Brassard (O'Reilly, Perry) (PP) – 35:30 | 3–3 |
| Ellis (Murray, McDavid) – 41:34 | 4–3 |

6 min
Penalties
14 min
27
Shots
33

== Bronze medal game ==
| 22 May 2016; 16:15 | Russia | 7–2 (2–0, 3–1, 2–1) | United States | VTB Ice Palace, Moscow; Attendance: 12,043 |

Game reference

Sergei Bobrovsky
Goalies
Keith Kinkaid
Mike Condon
Referees:
(Sweden) Tobias Björk
(Czech Republic) Martin Fraňo
Linesmen:
(Czech Republic) Miroslav Lhotský
(Sweden) Henrik Pihlblad

| Voynov (Kalinin, Shirokov) – 06:23 | 1–0 |
| Mozyakin (Datsyuk, Orlov) (PP) – 13:41 | 2–0 |
| Telegin (Datsyuk, Mozyakin) – 29:36 | 3–0 |
| Dadonov (Panarin, Shipachyov) – 32:49 | 4–0 |
| | 4–1 | 34:29 – Vatrano (Warsofsky, Nelson) (PP) |
| Panarin (Belov, Chudinov) – 35:22 | 5–1 |
| | 5–2 | 43:42 – Vatrano (Warsofsky) |
| Mozyakin (Datsyuk) – 53:13 | 6–2 |
| Shipachyov (Dadonov, Panarin) (PP) – 59:53 | 7–2 |

10 min
Penalties
8 min
29
Shots
30

== Gold medal game ==
| 22 May 2016; 20:45 | Finland | 0–2 (0–1, 0–0, 0–1) | Canada | VTB Ice Palace, Moscow; Attendance: 11,509 |

Game reference
| Mikko Koskinen | Goalies | Cam Talbot | Referees: (Russia) Roman Gofman (Switzerland) Tobias Wehrli; Linesmen: (Russia) Gleb Lazarev (United States) Fraser McIntyre |
| 0–1 / 11:24 – McDavid (Duchene); 0–2 / 59:59 – Duchene (Marchand) (ENG) | | | Referees: (Russia) Roman Gofman (Switzerland) Tobias Wehrli; Linesmen: (Russia) Gleb Lazarev (United States) Fraser McIntyre |
| 6 min | Penalties | 8 min | Referees: (Russia) Roman Gofman (Switzerland) Tobias Wehrli; Linesmen: (Russia) Gleb Lazarev (United States) Fraser McIntyre |
| 16 | Shots | 33 | Referees: (Russia) Roman Gofman (Switzerland) Tobias Wehrli; Linesmen: (Russia) Gleb Lazarev (United States) Fraser McIntyre |
