= 2016 IIHF World Championship final =

Ice hockey match

	1	2	3	Total
Finland	0	0	0	0
Canada	1	0	1	2
- Date: 22 May 2016
- Arena: VTB Ice Palace
- City: Moscow
- Attendance: 11,509

The 2016 IIHF World Championship final was played at the VTB Ice Palace in Moscow, Russia, on 22 May 2016 between Finland and Canada. Canada defeated Finland 2–0 to win the championship. Finland and Canada entered the tournament as the fourth and first place seeds, respectively.

== Road to the final ==
=== Finland ===
Finland's last made the final in 2014, losing out to Russia 2–5. The team went undefeated 7–0 record in round robin play, beating opposing finalists Canada 4–0 in the last group game. They then beat Denmark 5–1 in the quarterfinals and Russia 3–1 in the semifinals.

=== Canada ===
Defending champions Canada were first seeds coming into the championship. The team went 6–1 record in round robin play, losing to opposing finalists Finland 0–4 in the last group game. They then beat Sweden 6–0 in the quarterfinals and the United States 4–3 in the semifinals.

=== Summary ===
Finland
Round
Canada
Opponent
Result
Preliminary round
Opponent
Result
Belarus
6–2
Game 1
United States
5–1
Germany
5–1
Game 2
Hungary
7–1
United States
3–2
Game 3
Belarus
8–0
Hungary
3–0
Game 4
Germany
5–2
France
3–1
Game 5
Slovakia
5–0
Slovakia
5–0
Game 6
France
4–0
Canada
4–0
Game 7
Finland
0–4

Preliminary

Both teams played in Group B:

Pos	Team	Pld	W	OTW	OTL	L	GF	GA	GD	Pts	Qualification or relegation
1	Finland	7	7	0	0	0	29	6	+23	21	Playoff round
2	Canada	7	6	0	0	1	34	8	+26	18	Playoff round
3	Germany	7	4	0	1	2	22	20	+2	13	Playoff round
4	United States	7	3	0	1	3	22	18	+4	10	Playoff round
5	Slovakia	7	2	1	0	4	15	23	−8	8	
6	Belarus	7	2	0	0	5	16	32	−16	6	
7	France	7	1	1	0	5	11	23	−12	5	
8	Hungary (R)	7	1	0	0	6	12	31	−19	3	Relegation to Division I A (Note: The rules state that "the bottom ranked two teams will be relegated" and the 2017 hosts (France and Germany) cannot be relegated by rule.)

Source: IIHF
Rules for classification: 1) points; 2) head-to-head points; 3) head-to-head goal difference; 4) head-to-head number of goals scored; 5) result against closest best-ranked team outside tied teams; 6) result against second-best ranked team outside tied teams; 7) seeding before tournament.
(R) Relegated
Notes:
Opponent
Result
Playoff
Opponent
Result
Denmark
5–1
Quarterfinals
Sweden
6–0
Russia
3–1
Semifinals
United States
4–3

== Match ==
Connor McDavid scored his first goal of the tournament for Canada midway through the first period. The scoreline remained the same throughout the second period, despite a sustained Canadian attack. In an attempt to level the match, Finnish goaltender Mikko Koskinen was substituted with a minute to go in the last period for an extra attacker. The game was heading for a slender 1–0 win for the Canadians before Brad Marchand slotted in a second into an empty net in the final second of normal time. Canada goaltender Cam Talbot finished the game with 16 saves for his tournament leading 4th shutout.

22 May 2016; 20:45	Finland	0–2 (0–1, 0–0, 0–1)	Canada	VTB Ice Palace, Moscow; Attendance: 11,509

Game reference
Mikko Koskinen	Goalies	Cam Talbot	Referees: (Russia) Roman Gofman (Switzerland) Tobias Wehrli; Linesmen: (Russia) Gleb Lazarev (United States) Fraser McIntyre
0–1 / 11:24 – McDavid (Duchene); 0–2 / 59:59 – Duchene (Marchand) (ENG)			Referees: (Russia) Roman Gofman (Switzerland) Tobias Wehrli; Linesmen: (Russia) Gleb Lazarev (United States) Fraser McIntyre
6 min	Penalties	8 min	Referees: (Russia) Roman Gofman (Switzerland) Tobias Wehrli; Linesmen: (Russia) Gleb Lazarev (United States) Fraser McIntyre
16	Shots	33	Referees: (Russia) Roman Gofman (Switzerland) Tobias Wehrli; Linesmen: (Russia) Gleb Lazarev (United States) Fraser McIntyre
