= Eric Blum =

Swiss ice hockey player (born 1986)

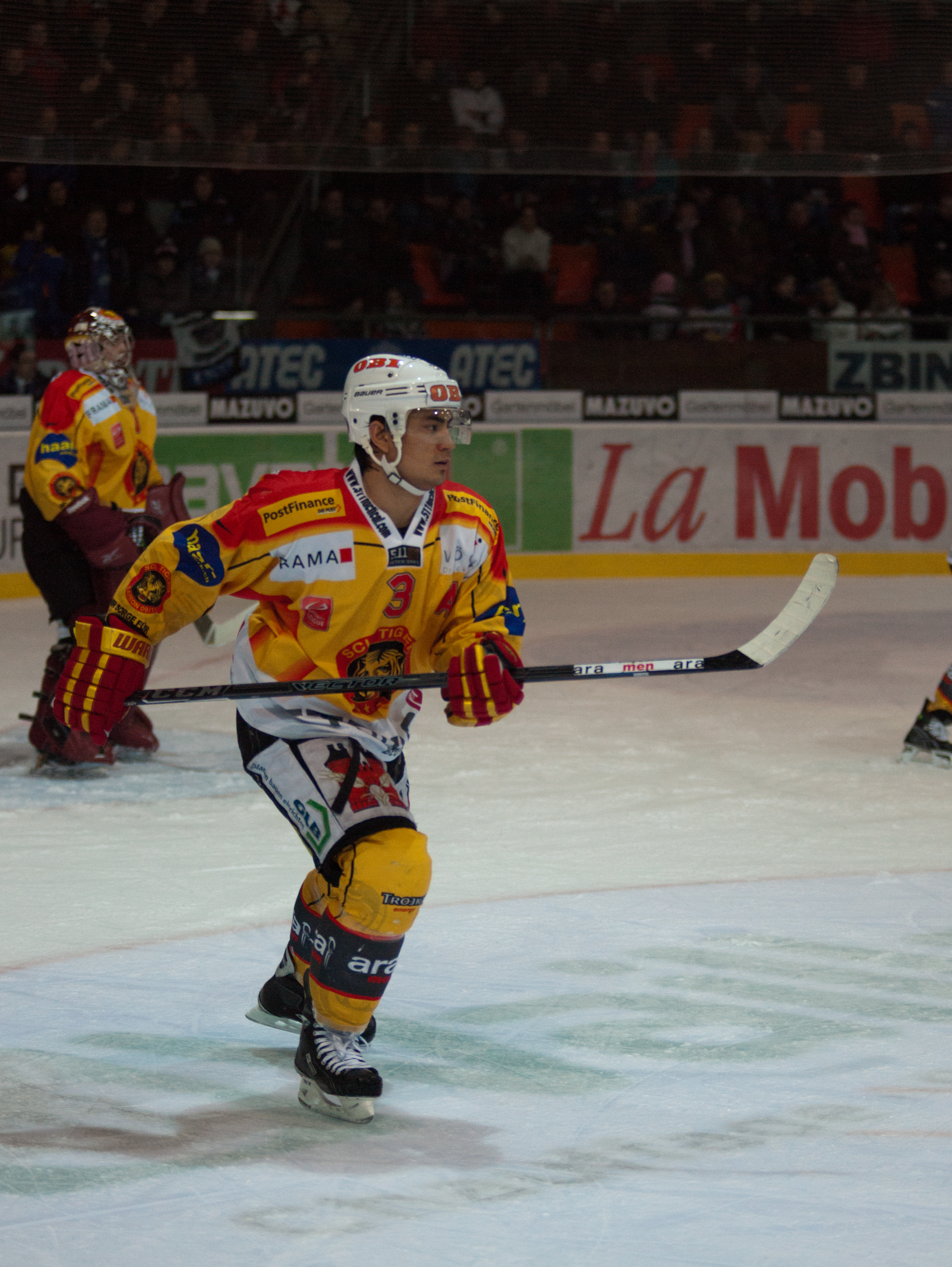
- Born: 13 June 1986 (age 39) Pfaffnau, Switzerland
- Height: 5 ft 10 in (178 cm)
- Weight: 181 lb (82 kg; 12 st 13 lb)
- Position: Defence
- Shot: Left
- Played for: GCK Lions; SCL Tigers; Kloten Flyers; SC Bern
- National team: Switzerland
- Playing career: 2003–2022

Eric Blum (born 13 June 1986) is a Swiss former professional ice hockey player. He last played for SC Bern of the National League (NL).

== Playing career ==
Blum joined SC Bern after four seasons with the Kloten Flyers, signing a three-year deal with an NHL/KHL out clause on May 2, 2014.

On September 26, 2016, Blum agreed to a 5-year contract extension with SC Bern worth CHF 3.5 million.

Blum missed the entire 2021-22 season and subsequently retired from professional hockey, citing concussion issues.

== International play ==
Blum competed in the 2013 IIHF World Championship as a member of the Switzerland men's national ice hockey team.

Representing Switzerland internationally, he participated in four World Championships (winning a silver medal in 2013) and the 2018 Olympic Winter Games. He won a total of 89 caps (5 goals, 14 assists) for the Swiss men's national team, before announcing the end of his international career in April 2018.

== Career statistics ==
=== Regular season and playoffs ===
			Regular season					Playoffs
Season	Team	League	GP	G	A	Pts	PIM	GP	G	A	Pts	PIM
2002–03	GCK Lions	SUI U20	15	0	1	1	10	5	0	1	1	2
2003–04	GCK Lions	SUI U20	9	1	1	2	6	—	—	—	—	—
2003–04	GCK Lions	SUI.2	39	1	3	4	26	6	0	0	0	0
2004–05	GCK Lions	SUI.2	31	2	6	8	6	—	—	—	—	—
2005–06	GCK Lions	SUI.2	40	3	11	14	30	4	1	0	1	16
2006–07	SCL Tigers	NLA	41	0	0	0	20	—	—	—	—	—
2007–08	SCL Tigers	NLA	42	3	5	8	16	—	—	—	—	—
2008–09	SCL Tigers	NLA	36	3	1	4	30	—	—	—	—	—
2009–10	SCL Tigers	NLA	49	4	12	16	58	—	—	—	—	—
2010–11	Kloten Flyers	NLA	48	5	15	20	18	18	0	2	2	12
2011–12	Kloten Flyers	NLA	39	5	12	17	20	5	0	0	0	0
2012–13	Kloten Flyers	NLA	45	5	11	16	22	—	—	—	—	—
2013–14	Kloten Flyers	NLA	46	6	15	21	32	15	3	3	6	12
2014–15	SC Bern	NLA	50	2	23	25	26	11	2	3	5	2
2015–16	SC Bern	NLA	35	4	24	28	12	10	2	1	3	18
2016–17	SC Bern	NLA	47	5	16	21	6	16	3	5	8	2
2017–18	SC Bern	NL	37	3	19	22	14	8	0	2	2	2
2018–19	SC Bern	NL	48	6	12	18	22	18	1	6	7	2
2019–20	SC Bern	NL	45	0	11	11	8	—	—	—	—	—
2020–21	SC Bern	NL	19	2	10	12	10	—	—	—	—	—
NL totals			627	53	186	239	314	101	11	22	33	50

Medal record

Ice hockey

Representing Switzerland

World Championships
Silver medal – second place	2013 Sweden/Finland	

=== International ===
Year	Team	Event	Result	GP	G	A	Pts	PIM
2004	Switzerland	WJC18 D1	11th	5	1	0	1	0
2006	Switzerland	WJC	7th	6	2	3	5	4
2013	Switzerland	WC	2nd place, silver medalist(s)	9	0	1	1	2
2014	Switzerland	WC	10th	7	1	0	1	0
2015	Switzerland	WC	8th	8	0	2	2	2
2016	Switzerland	WC	11th	7	2	1	3	0
2018	Switzerland	OG	10th	4	0	0	0	0
Junior totals				11	3	3	6	4
Senior totals				35	3	4	7	4

== Awards and honours ==
Award	Year
NL
All-Star Team	2015, 2016
Champion (SC Bern)	2016, 2017, 2019
