= Félicien Du Bois =

Swiss ice hockey player (born 1983)

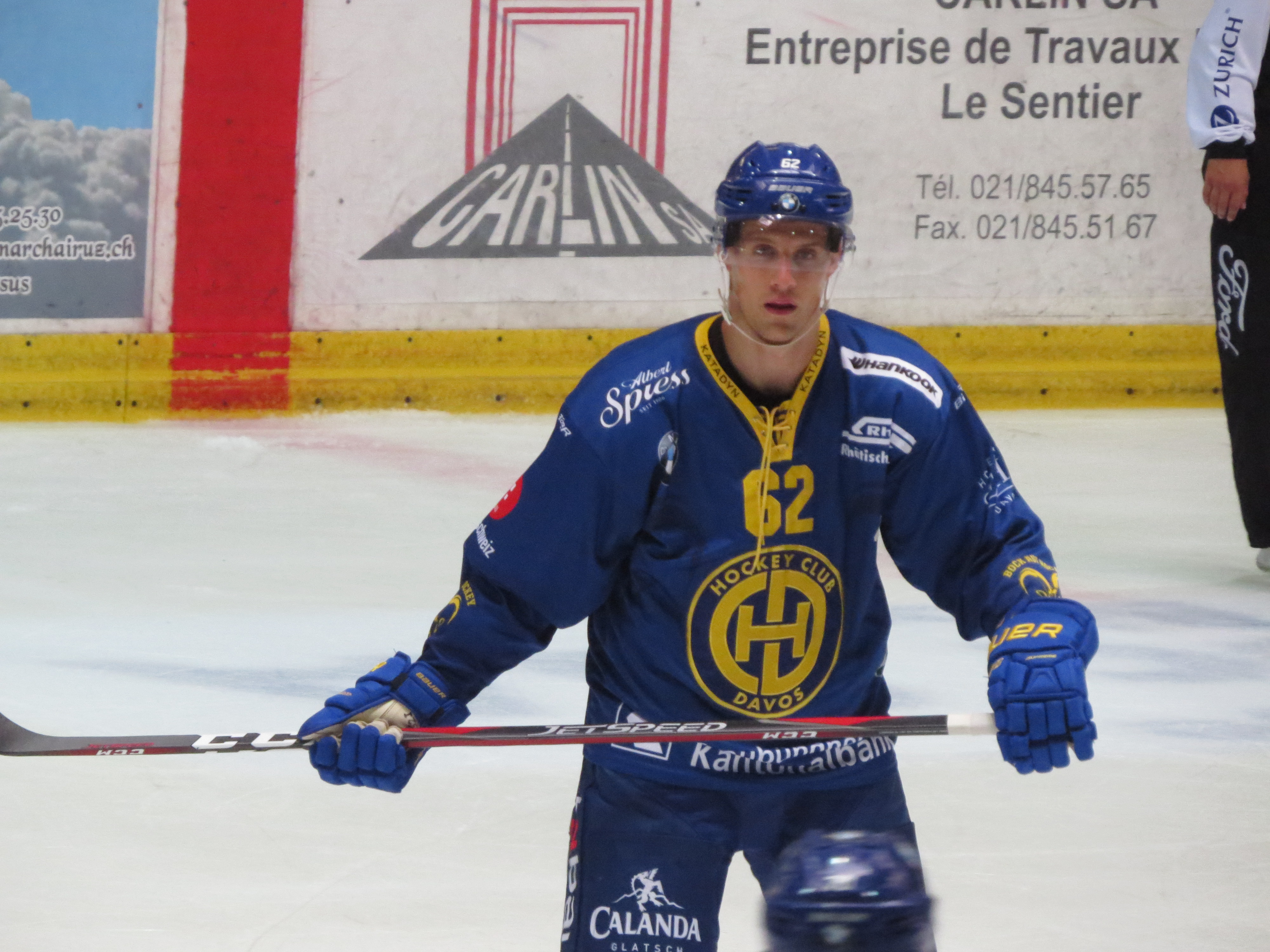
- Born: October 18, 1983 (age 41); Neuchâtel, Switzerland
- Height: 6 ft 2 in (188 cm)
- Weight: 185 lb (84 kg; 13 st 3 lb)
- Position: Defence
- Shot: Right
- Played for: HC Ambrì-Piotta; EHC Kloten; HC Davos
- National team: Switzerland
- Playing career: 2002–2021

Félicien Du Bois (born 18 October 1983) is a Swiss former professional ice hockey defenceman who spent his whole career in the National League (NL).

He currently serves as a color commentator for hockey games on the Swiss francophone TV station, RTS.

== Playing career ==
Du Bois joined Davos from the 2014–15 season on a four-year contract after spending the previous six seasons with the Kloten Flyers.

On November 15, 2020, Du Bois announced that he would retire from professional hockey at the conclusion of the 2020-21 season.

== International play ==
He made his international debut at the 2009 IIHF World Championship and has participated at the 2010, 2011, 2012, 2015 and 2016 as a member of the Switzerland men's national ice hockey team.

== Career statistics ==
=== Regular season and playoffs ===
			Regular season					Playoffs
Season	Team	League	GP	G	A	Pts	PIM	GP	G	A	Pts	PIM
2000–01	HC Ambrì–Piotta	SUI U20	27	4	4	8	6	2	0	0	0	0
2001–02	HC Ambrì–Piotta	SUI U20	36	8	7	15	24	2	0	0	0	0
2002–03	HC Ambrì–Piotta	SUI U20	28	5	8	13	40	—	—	—	—	—
2002–03	HC Ambrì–Piotta	NLA	15	0	0	0	2	4	0	0	0	0
2002–03	HC Sierre	SUI.2	2	0	0	0	0	—	—	—	—	—
2003–04	HC Ambrì–Piotta	NLA	28	0	1	1	8	7	0	0	0	0
2003–04	HC Sierre	SUI.2	1	2	0	2	2	—	—	—	—	—
2004–05	HC Ambrì–Piotta	NLA	44	2	7	9	30	5	0	1	1	0
2005–06	HC Ambrì–Piotta	NLA	36	6	12	18	48	7	1	1	2	6
2006–07	HC Ambrì–Piotta	NLA	44	5	7	12	69	—	—	—	—	—
2007–08	HC Ambrì–Piotta	NLA	41	6	12	18	51	—	—	—	—	—
2008–09	Kloten Flyers	NLA	45	2	27	29	32	15	2	3	5	20
2009–10	Kloten Flyers	NLA	34	5	12	17	26	10	3	4	7	14
2010–11	Kloten Flyers	NLA	47	5	22	27	53	18	1	5	6	8
2011–12	Kloten Flyers	NLA	29	4	7	11	10	5	1	1	2	2
2012–13	Kloten Flyers	NLA	26	1	3	4	10	—	—	—	—	—
2013–14	Kloten Flyers	NLA	31	6	8	14	32	—	—	—	—	—
2014–15	HC Davos	NLA	46	7	10	17	16	15	2	4	6	4
2015–16	HC Davos	NLA	31	5	6	11	10	9	0	5	5	6
2016–17	HC Davos	NLA	42	5	15	20	18	10	1	3	4	6
2017–18	HC Davos	NL	43	1	17	18	28	6	1	4	5	4
2018–19	HC Davos	NL	48	1	15	16	44	—	—	—	—	—
2019–20	HC Davos	NL	41	7	14	21	20	—	—	—	—	—
2020–21	HC Davos	NL	4	0	0	0	26	—	—	—	—	—
NL totals			675	68	195	263	533	111	12	31	43	70

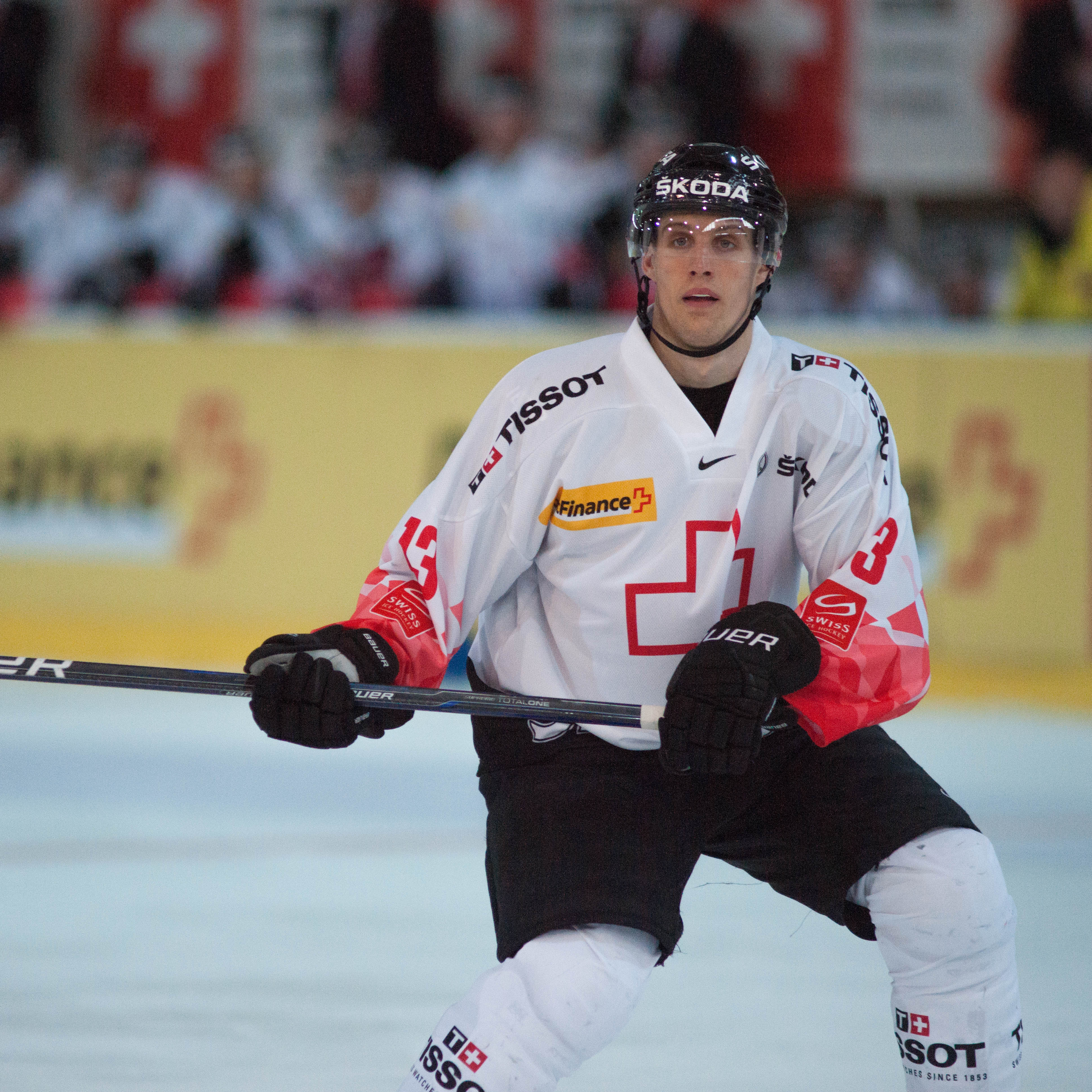
Du Bois representing Switzerland in 2012.

=== International ===
Year	Team	Event	Result	GP	G	A	Pts	PIM
2009	Switzerland	WC	9th	5	0	2	2	6
2010	Switzerland	WC	5th	7	0	0	0	4
2011	Switzerland	WC	9th	6	1	1	2	2
2012	Switzerland	WC	11th	7	1	1	2	2
2015	Switzerland	WC	8th	2	1	0	1	0
2016	Switzerland	WC	11th	7	1	3	4	18
2018	Switzerland	OG	10th	3	1	1	2	4
Senior totals				37	5	8	13	36
