= Noah Schneeberger =

Swiss ice hockey player

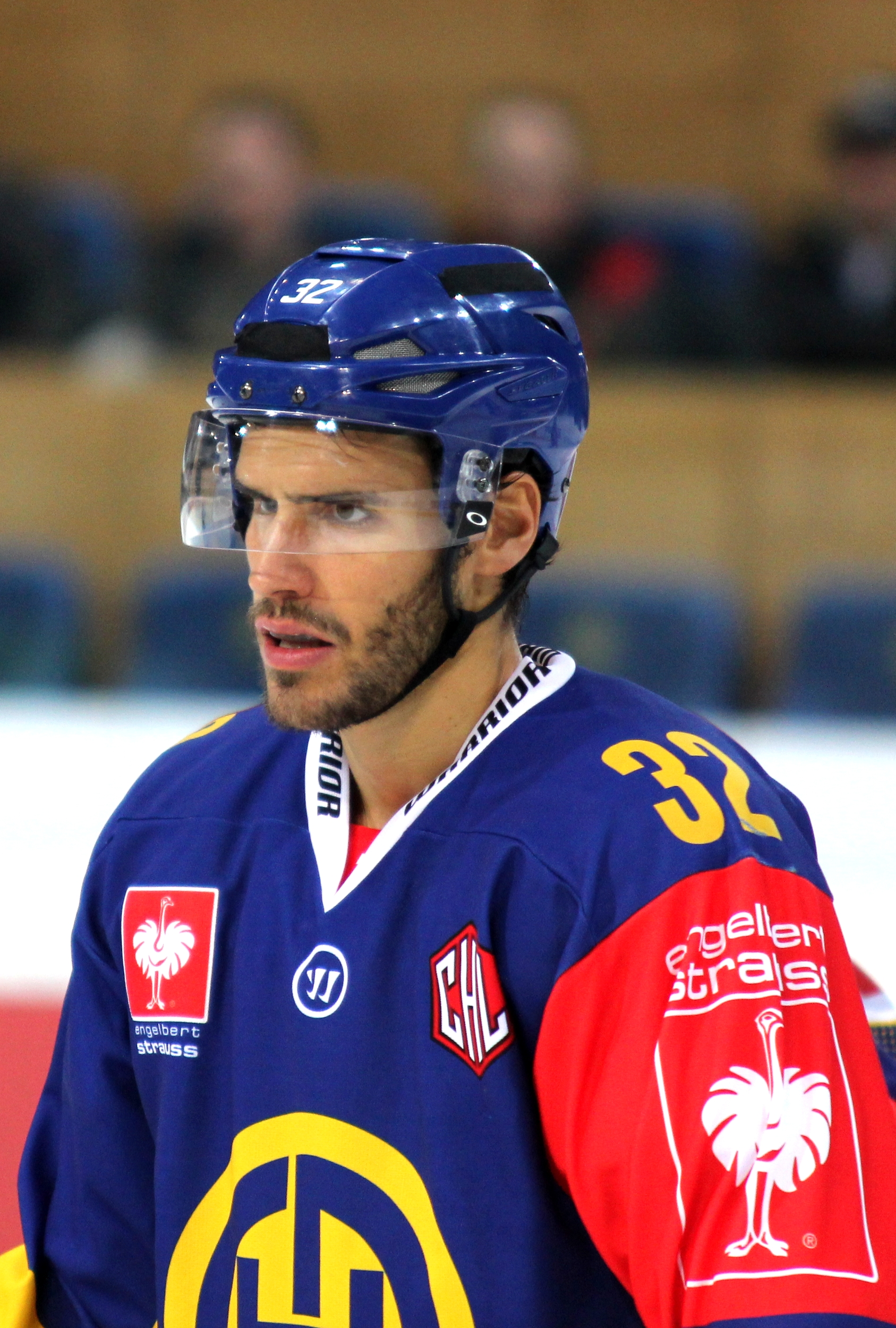
- Born: 23 May 1988 (age 37) Langenthal, Switzerland
- Height: 6 ft 2 in (188 cm)
- Weight: 187 lb (85 kg; 13 st 5 lb)
- Position: Defenceman
- Shoots: Right
- NL team Former teams: EHC Biel; SCL Tigers; Genève-Servette HC; HC Davos; HC Fribourg-Gottéron; SC Rapperswil-Jona Lakers; Lausanne HC
- National team: Switzerland
- Playing career: 2006–present

Noah Schneeberger (born 23 May 1988) is a Swiss professional ice hockey defenceman currently playing for EHC Biel of the National League (NL).
