= Topi Jaakola =

Finnish ice hockey player (born 1983)

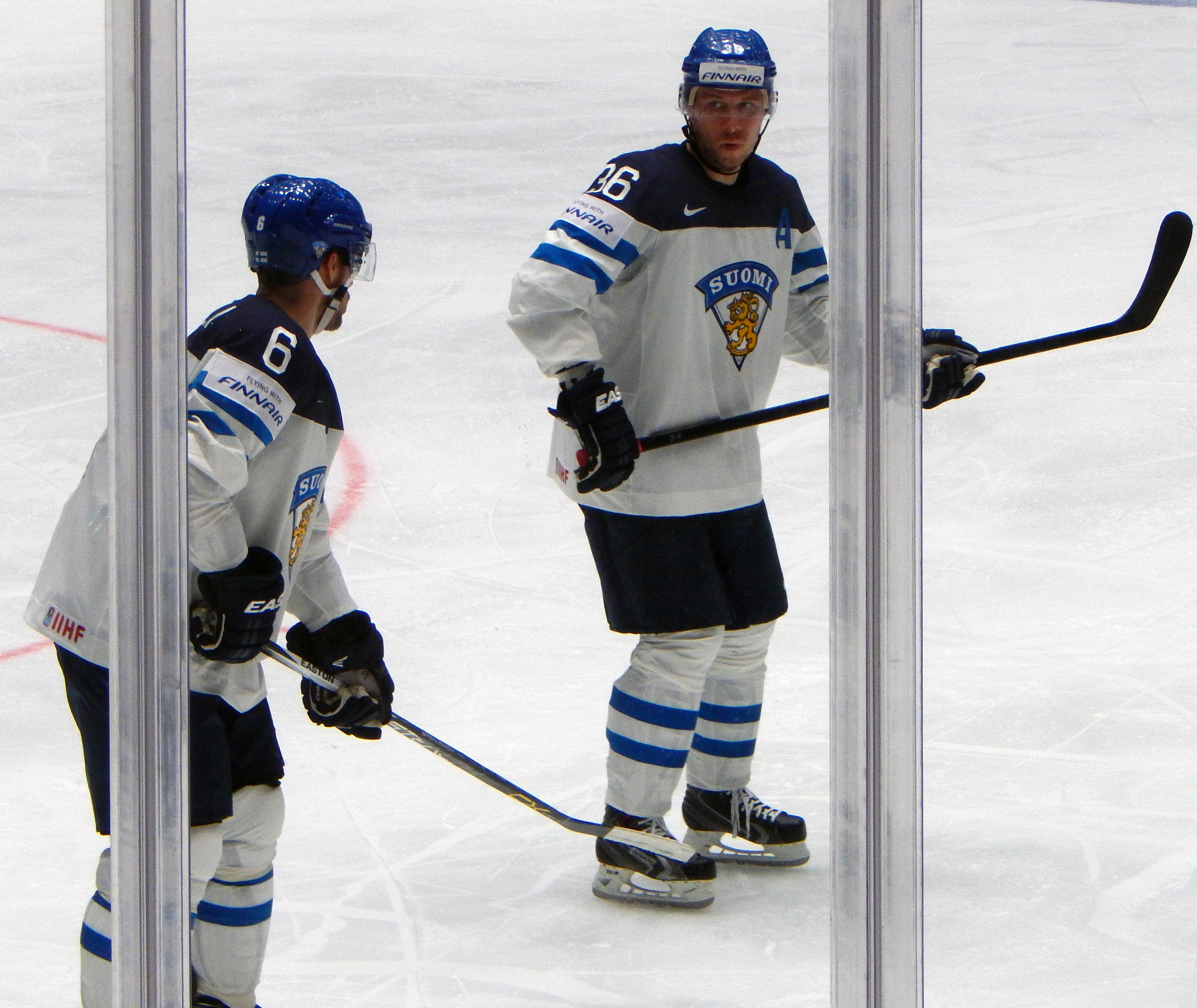
- Jaakola (left) at the 2016 IIHF World Championship
- Born: 15 November 1983 (age 42) Oulu, Finland
- Height: 6 ft 2 in (188 cm)
- Weight: 198 lb (90 kg; 14 st 2 lb)
- Position: Defence
- Shot: Left
- NL team Former teams: ZSC Lions; Oulun Kärpät; Södertälje SK; Luleå HF; Amur Khabarovsk; HC Lev Praha; Jokerit; HV71; HC TPS
- National team: Finland
- NHL draft: 134th overall, 2002; Florida Panthers
- Playing career: 2000–2020
Medal record
World Championships
Gold medal – first place	2011 Slovakia
Silver medal – second place	2016 Russia
World Junior Championships
Bronze medal – third place	2002 Czech Republic
Bronze medal – third place	2003 Canada
World U18 Championships
Bronze medal – third place	2001 Finland

Topi Jaakola (born 15 November 1983) is a Finnish professional ice hockey defenceman who is currently playing for the ZSC Lions in the National League (NL). He was drafted by the Florida Panthers, 134th overall, in the 2002 NHL entry draft however opted to remain in Europe to pursue his professional career. Internationally he has represented Finland at several World Championships, where he won the 2011 World Championship.

== Playing career ==
He played his first games at senior level during the 2000–01 season and became a regular player during the following season. He spent his entire Finnish career in the Liiga with Oulun Kärpät, winning four championships (2004, 2005, 2007, 2008). For the 2008–09 season he moved to Sweden to play in Södertälje SK.

On 30 July 2014, at the completion of his contract with HC Lev Praha, Jaakola remained in the KHL but returned to Finland in agreeing to a two-year contract with Jokerit.

== International play ==
Jaakola has played for Finland at seven World Championships. He won the gold at the 2011 World Championship and a silver in 2016. He also played for the Finnish national junior team, and won bronze medals in 2002 and 2003.

== Career statistics ==
=== Regular season and playoffs ===
			Regular season					Playoffs
Season	Team	League	GP	G	A	Pts	PIM	GP	G	A	Pts	PIM
1999–2000	Kärpät	FIN U18	33	5	12	17	71	5	1	1	2	4
1999–2000	Kärpät	FIN U20	3	0	0	0	0	—	—	—	—	—
2000–01	Kärpät	FIN U18	2	1	1	2	0	—	—	—	—	—
2000–01	Kärpät	FIN U20	33	3	9	12	47	6	0	2	2	6
2000–01	Kärpät	SM-liiga	4	0	0	0	2	4	0	0	0	0
2001–02	Kärpät	FIN U20	3	0	0	0	2	2	1	0	1	0
2001–02	Kärpät	SM-liiga	44	0	4	4	18	4	0	0	0	4
2002–03	Kärpät	FIN U20	1	0	0	0	0	—	—	—	—	—
2002–03	Kärpät	SM-liiga	52	2	2	4	18	15	0	0	0	8
2003–04	Kärpät	SM-liiga	52	0	4	4	12	14	0	1	1	6
2004–05	Kärpät	SM-liiga	33	1	3	4	6	—	—	—	—	—
2005–06	Kärpät	SM-liiga	55	1	7	8	28	11	0	0	0	2
2006–07	Kärpät	SM-liiga	56	2	6	8	36	10	0	3	3	8
2007–08	Kärpät	SM-liiga	55	3	11	14	46	14	4	5	9	10
2008–09	Södertälje SK	SEL	51	0	11	11	22	—	—	—	—	—
2009–10	Södertälje SK	SEL	30	0	4	4	8	—	—	—	—	—
2010–11	Luleå HF	SEL	55	2	5	7	14	13	0	5	5	2
2011–12	Luleå HF	SEL	54	2	13	15	18	5	0	1	1	0
2012–13	Amur Khabarovsk	KHL	27	5	5	10	16	—	—	—	—	—
2013–14	HC Lev Praha	KHL	48	9	4	13	16	11	0	1	1	4
2014–15	Jokerit	KHL	54	4	10	14	24	10	0	2	2	0
2015–16	Jokerit	KHL	57	10	15	25	45	5	0	2	2	25
2016–17	Jokerit	KHL	55	3	16	19	37	4	0	2	2	2
2017–18	HV71	SHL	39	2	6	8	16	—	—	—	—	—
2018–19	TPS	Liiga	1	0	0	0	0	—	—	—	—	—
2019–20	Pelicans	Liiga	38	3	14	17	33	—	—	—	—	—
2019–20	ZSC Lions	NL	1	0	0	0	0	—	—	—	—	—
SM-liiga/Liiga totals			390	12	51	63	199	72	4	9	13	38
SEL/SHL totals			229	6	39	45	78	38	2	11	13	12
KHL totals			241	31	50	81	138	30	0	7	7	31

=== International ===
Year	Team	Event	GP	G	A	Pts	PIM
2000	Finland	U17	3	0	0	0	0
2001	Finland	WJC18	6	1	1	2	4
2002	Finland	WJC	6	0	0	0	2
2003	Finland	WJC	7	1	1	2	4
2009	Finland	WC	7	0	0	0	4
2010	Finland	WC	7	0	1	1	4
2011	Finland	WC	9	0	1	1	6
2012	Finland	WC	10	0	0	0	2
2015	Finland	WC	8	0	1	1	6
2016	Finland	WC	10	0	2	2	0
2017	Finland	WC	10	1	0	1	2
Junior totals			22	2	2	4	10
Senior totals			61	1	5	6	24
