= 2016 IIHF World Championship =

2016 edition of the IIHF World Championship

Tournament details
- Host country: Russia
- Venues: 2 (in 2 host cities)
- Dates: 6–22 May
- Opened by: Dmitry Medvedev
- Teams: 16

Final positions
- Champions: Canada (26th title)
- Runners-up: Finland
- Third place: Russia
- Fourth place: United States

Tournament statistics
- Games played: 64
- Goals scored: 363 (5.67 per game)
- Attendance: 417,414 (6,522 per game)
- Scoring leader: (Russia) Vadim Shipachyov (18 points)

Awards
- MVP: (Finland) Patrik Laine

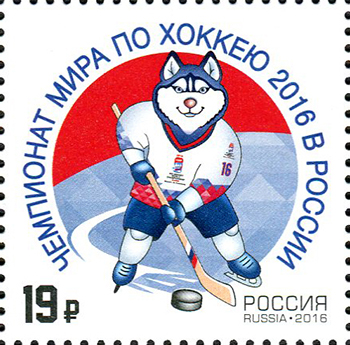
2016 postage stamp of Russia, dedicated to 2016 IIHF World Championship. Laika, the mascot of the championship, is in the centre.

The 2016 IIHF World Championship was the 80th such event hosted by the International Ice Hockey Federation (IIHF), being held from 6 to 22 May 2016 in Moscow and Saint Petersburg, Russia. Canada entered the tournament as the defending 2015 champions. Hungary returned to the Championship after a 6-year absence, and Kazakhstan after a 1-year absence.

Canada won their 26th gold medal, defeating Finland 2–0 in the gold medal game. With the win Corey Perry became the second consecutive Canadian team captain to earn membership in the Triple Gold Club. Russia won the bronze medal, defeating the United States 7–2 in the bronze medal game.

== Bids ==
There were three official bids to host these championships. The decision on who hosts the tournament was decided during the final weekend of the 2011 IIHF World Championship in Bratislava, Slovakia.

- Denmark
  - Copenhagen/Herning

Denmark has never hosted these championships. The tournament was proposed to run from May 6–22, 2016 in Parken Stadium (Copenhagen, 15,000 seats) and Jyske Bank Boxen (Herning, 12,000 seats).

- Russia
  - Moscow/Saint Petersburg

Russia was the only bidder to ever have hosted these championships, with the most recent being in 2007. The tournament was proposed to run from April 29 – May 15, 2016 in Megasport Arena (Moscow, 13,577 seats) and Ice Palace (Saint Petersburg, 12,300 seats).

- Ukraine
  - Kyiv

Ukraine, like Denmark, has never hosted these championships. The tournament was proposed to run from May 6–22, 2016 in Palace of Sports (Kyiv, 7,000 seats) and a new 12,000 seat arena to be built by 2015 in Kyiv.

== Venues ==
Moscow	2016 IIHF World Championship is located in European Russia	Saint Petersburg
VTB Ice Palace	2016 IIHF World Championship is located in European Russia	Yubileyny Sports Palace
Capacity: 12,100	2016 IIHF World Championship is located in European Russia	Capacity: 7,300

== Participants ==
- Belarus (Note: Automatic qualifier after a top 14 placement at the 2015 IIHF World Championship)
- Canada
- Czech Republic
- Denmark
- Finland
- France
- Germany
- Hungary (Note: Qualified through winning a promotion at the 2015 IIHF World Championship Division I)
- Kazakhstan
- Latvia
- Norway
- Russia (Note: Qualified as host)
- Slovakia
- Sweden
- Switzerland
- United States

== Format ==
The 16 teams were split into two groups of eight teams. After playing a round-robin, the top four teams advance to the knockout stage, to play out the winner. The last team of each group will be relegated to Division I the following year.

== Seeding ==
The seeding in the preliminary round was based on the 2015 IIHF World Ranking, which ended at the conclusion of the 2015 IIHF World Championship.

Group A (Moscow)

- Russia (2)
- Sweden (3)
- Czech Republic (6)
- Switzerland (7)
- Latvia (10)
- Norway (11)
- Denmark (15)
- Kazakhstan (17)

Group B (St. Petersburg)

- Canada (1)
- Finland (4)
- United States (5)
- Slovakia (8)
- Belarus (9)
- France (12)
- Germany (13)
- Hungary (19)

== Rosters ==
Each team's roster consisted of at least 15 skaters (forwards and defencemen) and two goaltenders, and at most 22 skaters and three goaltenders. All 16 participating nations, through the confirmation of their respective national associations, had to submit a roster by the first IIHF directorate meeting.

== Officials ==
The IIHF selected 16 referees and 16 linesmen to work the tournament.

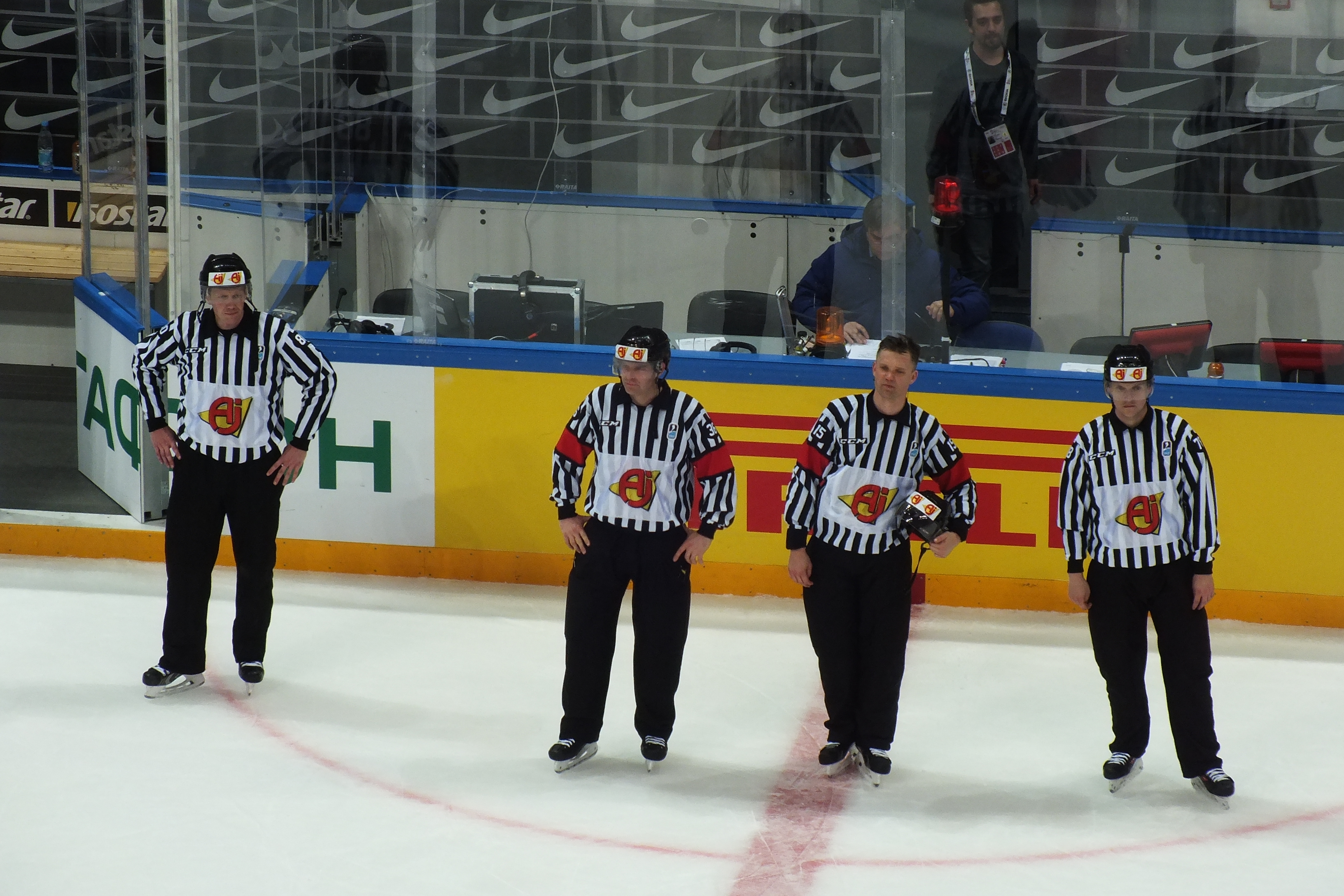
Henrik Pihlblad, Tobias Wehrli, Stefan Fonselius and Peter Šefčík during Norway vs. Denmark match

Referees	Linesmen
(Sweden) Tobias Björk; (Finland) Stefan Fonselius; (Czech Republic) Martin Fraňo; (Hungary) Péter Gebei; (Russia) Roman Gofman; (Canada) Brett Iverson; (Czech Republic) Antonín Jeřábek; (Slovakia) Jozef Kubuš; (United States) Timothy Mayer; (Sweden) Linus Ohlund; (Russia) Konstantin Olenin; (Germany) Daniel Piechaczek; (Finland) Aleksi Rantala; (Belarus) Maxim Sidorenko; (Switzerland) Tobias Wehrli; (Switzerland) Marc Wiegand	(Canada) Nicolas Chartrand-Piché; (Switzerland) Nicolas Fluri; (Switzerland) Roman Kaderli; (Norway) Jon Killian; (Russia) Gleb Lazarev; (Czech Republic) Vit Lederer; (Czech Republic) Miroslav Lhotský; (Sweden) Andreas Malmqvist; (United States) Fraser McIntyre; (Finland) Pasi Nieminen; (Russia) Alexander Otmakhov; (Sweden) Henrik Pihlblad; (Germany) Nikolaj Ponomarjow; (United States) Judson Ritter; (Slovakia) Peter Šefčík; (Finland) Sakari Suominen

== Preliminary round ==
The schedule was released on 15 July 2015.

=== Group A ===
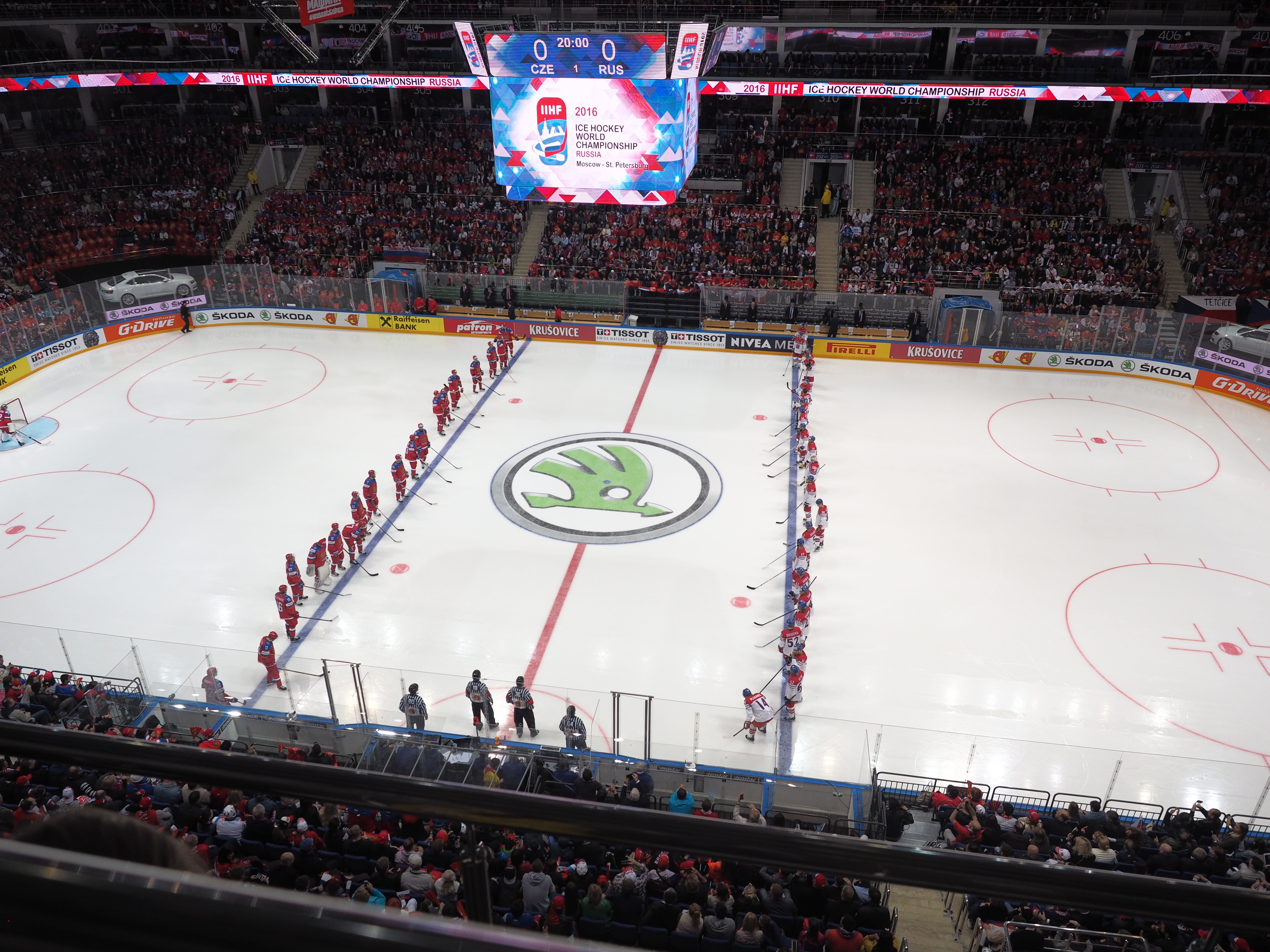
Russia vs Czech Republic at the VTB Ice Palace

Pos	Team	Pld	W	OTW	OTL	L	GF	GA	GD	Pts	Qualification or relegation
1	Czech Republic	7	5	1	1	0	27	12	+15	18 (Note: Czech Republic 3–0 Russia)	Playoff round
2	Russia (H)	7	6	0	0	1	32	10	+22	18	Playoff round
3	Sweden	7	3	2	0	2	23	18	+5	13	Playoff round
4	Denmark	7	2	2	1	2	17	22	−5	11	Playoff round
5	Norway	7	2	1	0	4	13	22	−9	8 (Note: Norway 4–3 (OT) Switzerland)	
6	Switzerland	7	1	1	3	2	20	26	−6	8	
7	Latvia	7	1	0	3	3	13	22	−9	6	
8	Kazakhstan (R)	7	0	1	0	6	15	28	−13	2	Relegation to Division I A (Note: The rules state that "the bottom ranked two teams will be relegated" and the 2017 hosts (France and Germany) cannot be relegated by rule.)

Source: IIHF
Rules for classification: 1) points; 2) head-to-head points; 3) head-to-head goal difference; 4) head-to-head number of goals scored; 5) result against closest best-ranked team outside tied teams; 6) result against second-best ranked team outside tied teams; 7) seeding before tournament.
(H) Host; (R) Relegated
Notes:

6 May 2016
Sweden	2–1 (OT)	Latvia
Czech Republic	3–0	Russia
7 May 2016
Switzerland	2–3 (GWS)	Kazakhstan
Norway	0–3	Denmark
Latvia	3–4 (GWS)	Czech Republic
8 May 2016
Kazakhstan	4–6	Russia
Norway	4–3 (OT)	Switzerland
Sweden	5–2	Denmark
9 May 2016
Latvia	0–4	Russia
Sweden	2–4	Czech Republic
10 May 2016
Switzerland	3–2 (OT)	Denmark
Kazakhstan	2–4	Norway
11 May 2016
Switzerland	5–4	Latvia
Sweden	7–3	Kazakhstan
12 May 2016
Czech Republic	7–0	Norway
Russia	10–1	Denmark
13 May 2016
Czech Republic	3–1	Kazakhstan
Denmark	3–2 (GWS)	Latvia
14 May 2016
Norway	2–3	Sweden
Russia	5–1	Switzerland
Kazakhstan	1–2	Latvia
15 May 2016
Denmark	2–1 (GWS)	Czech Republic
Switzerland	2–3 (GWS)	Sweden
16 May 2016
Russia	3–0	Norway
Denmark	4–1	Kazakhstan
17 May 2016
Czech Republic	5–4	Switzerland
Latvia	1–3	Norway
Russia	4–1	Sweden

=== Group B ===
Pos	Team	Pld	W	OTW	OTL	L	GF	GA	GD	Pts	Qualification or relegation
1	Finland	7	7	0	0	0	29	6	+23	21	Playoff round
2	Canada	7	6	0	0	1	34	8	+26	18	Playoff round
3	Germany	7	4	0	1	2	22	20	+2	13	Playoff round
4	United States	7	3	0	1	3	22	18	+4	10	Playoff round
5	Slovakia	7	2	1	0	4	15	23	−8	8	
6	Belarus	7	2	0	0	5	16	32	−16	6	
7	France	7	1	1	0	5	11	23	−12	5	
8	Hungary (R)	7	1	0	0	6	12	31	−19	3	Relegation to Division I A (Note: The rules state that "the bottom ranked two teams will be relegated" and the 2017 hosts (France and Germany) cannot be relegated by rule.)

Source: IIHF
Rules for classification: 1) points; 2) head-to-head points; 3) head-to-head goal difference; 4) head-to-head number of goals scored; 5) result against closest best-ranked team outside tied teams; 6) result against second-best ranked team outside tied teams; 7) seeding before tournament.
(R) Relegated
Notes:

6 May 2016
United States	1–5	Canada
Finland	6–2	Belarus
7 May 2016
Slovakia	4–1	Hungary
France	3–2 (GWS)	Germany
Belarus	3–6	United States
8 May 2016
Hungary	1–7	Canada
Finland	5–1	Germany
France	1–5	Slovakia
9 May 2016
Belarus	0–8	Canada
Finland	3–2	United States
10 May 2016
Slovakia	1–5	Germany
Hungary	2–6	France
11 May 2016
Slovakia	2–4	Belarus
Finland	3–0	Hungary
12 May 2016
United States	4–0	France
Canada	5–2	Germany
13 May 2016
United States	5–1	Hungary
Germany	5–2	Belarus
14 May 2016
France	1–3	Finland
Hungary	5–2	Belarus
Canada	5–0	Slovakia
15 May 2016
Germany	3–2	United States
Slovakia	0–5	Finland
16 May 2016
Canada	4–0	France
Germany	4–2	Hungary
17 May 2016
United States	2–3 (OT)	Slovakia
Belarus	3–0	France
Canada	0–4	Finland

== Playoff round ==
Quarterfinals
A1	Czech Republic	1
B4	United States (GWS)	2
B2	Canada	6
A3	Sweden	0
B1	Finland	5
A4	Denmark	1
A2	Russia	4
B3	Germany	1

Semifinals
B2	Canada	4
B4	United States	3
B1	Finland	3
A2	Russia	1

Finals
B1	Finland	0
B2	Canada	2
Bronze medal game
A2	Russia	7
B4	United States	2

=== Quarterfinals ===
19 May 2016; 16:15	Czech Republic	1–2 GWS (1–0, 0–1, 0–0); OT (0–0); GWS (0–1)	United States	VTB Ice Palace, Moscow; Attendance: 7,853

Game reference
Dominik Furch	Goalies	Keith Kinkaid	Referees: (Sweden) Linus Ohlund (Switzerland) Tobias Wehrli; Linesmen: (Russia) Alexander Otmakhov (Sweden) Henrik Pihlblad
Zohorna (PS) – 15:23 / 1–0; / 1–1 / 21:27 – Matthews (Vatrano, Wideman)			Referees: (Sweden) Linus Ohlund (Switzerland) Tobias Wehrli; Linesmen: (Russia) Alexander Otmakhov (Sweden) Henrik Pihlblad
Kašpar (miss); Koukal (miss); Zohorna (miss)	Shootout	(miss) Hendricks; Matthews	Referees: (Sweden) Linus Ohlund (Switzerland) Tobias Wehrli; Linesmen: (Russia) Alexander Otmakhov (Sweden) Henrik Pihlblad
12 min	Penalties	12 min	Referees: (Sweden) Linus Ohlund (Switzerland) Tobias Wehrli; Linesmen: (Russia) Alexander Otmakhov (Sweden) Henrik Pihlblad
32	Shots	28	Referees: (Sweden) Linus Ohlund (Switzerland) Tobias Wehrli; Linesmen: (Russia) Alexander Otmakhov (Sweden) Henrik Pihlblad

19 May 2016; 16:15	Finland	5–1 (1–0, 2–1, 2–0)	Denmark	Yubileyny Sports Palace, Saint Petersburg; Attendance: 5,038

Game reference

Mikko Koskinen
Goalies
Sebastian Dahm
Referees:
(Czech Republic) Martin Fraňo
(Slovakia) Jozef Kubuš
Linesmen:
(Switzerland) Nicolas Fluri
(Russia) Gleb Lazarev

Granlund (Koivu, Komarov) – 14:29	1–0
Koskiranta (Pyörälä, Ohtamaa) – 21:45	2–0
	2–1	31:42 – Eller (Christensen, Ehlers) (PP)
Laine (Hietanen, Jaakola) – 38:57	3–1
Jokinen (Koivu) (EN) – 57:46	4–1
Granlund – 58:07	5–1

6 min
Penalties
6 min
28
Shots
17

19 May 2016; 20:15	Russia	4–1 (0–1, 3–0, 1–0)	Germany	VTB Ice Palace, Moscow; Attendance: 12,199

Game reference

Sergei Bobrovsky
Goalies
Thomas Greiss
Referees:
(Sweden) Tobias Björk
(Finland) Aleksi Rantala
Linesmen:
(Czech Republic) Miroslav Lhotský
(United States) Fraser McIntyre

	0–1	04:45 – Reimer
Shipachyov (Dadonov, Belov) – 20:40	1–1
Dadonov (Shipachyov) – 27:17	2–1
Shipachyov (Telegin) – 34:14	3–1
Ovechkin (Kuznetsov, Lyubimov) – 42:45	4–1

2 min
Penalties
4 min
37
Shots
20

19 May 2016; 20:15	Canada	6–0 (1–0, 3–0, 2–0)	Sweden	Yubileyny Sports Palace, Saint Petersburg; Attendance: 6,090

Game reference

Cam Talbot
Goalies
Jacob Markström
Referees:
(Russia) Roman Gofman
(Belarus) Maxim Sidorenko
Linesmen:
(United States) Judson Ritter
(Finland) Sakari Suominen

Scheifele (O'Reilly, Stone) – 18:39	1–0
Dumba (Stone, Scheifele) (PP) – 26:05	2–0
Marchand (Dumba, Scheifele) – 32:02	3–0
Domi (Reinhart, Matheson) – 32:13	4–0
Stone – 51:05	5–0
Brassard (Gallagher, Hall) – 53:22	6–0

10 min
Penalties
18 min
34
Shots
24

=== Semifinals ===
21 May 2016; 16:15	Finland	3–1 (0–1, 3–0, 0–0)	Russia	VTB Ice Palace, Moscow; Attendance: 12,215

Game reference

Mikko Koskinen
Goalies
Sergei Bobrovsky
Referees:
(Czech Republic) Martin Fraňo
(Slovakia) Jozef Kubuš
Linesmen:
(United States) Fraser McIntyre
(United States) Judson Ritter

	0–1	02:52 – Shirokov (Telegin, Marchenko)
Aho (Granlund, Lindell) (PP) – 25:34	1–1
Jokinen (Laine) – 35:50	2–1
Aho (Koskiranta, Koivu) (PP) – 38:15	3–1

10 min
Penalties
8 min
16
Shots
29

21 May 2016; 20:15	Canada	4–3 (2–0, 1–3, 1–0)	United States	VTB Ice Palace, Moscow; Attendance: 10,455

Game reference

Cam Talbot
Goalies
Keith Kinkaid
Referees:
(Russia) Roman Gofman
(Switzerland) Tobias Wehrli
Linesmen:
(Czech Republic) Miroslav Lhotský
(Russia) Alexander Otmakhov

Gallagher (Jenner, Reinhart) – 08:59	1–0
Marchand (Ceci) – 18:02	2–0
	2–1	21:14 – Matthews (Wideman, Larkin) (PP)
	2–2	23:57 – Warsofsky (Nelson, Fasching)
	2–3	28:25 – Motte (Larkin, Compher)
Brassard (O'Reilly, Perry) (PP) – 35:30	3–3
Ellis (Murray, McDavid) – 41:34	4–3

6 min
Penalties
14 min
27
Shots
33

=== Bronze medal game ===
22 May 2016; 16:15	Russia	7–2 (2–0, 3–1, 2–1)	United States	VTB Ice Palace, Moscow; Attendance: 12,043

Game reference

Sergei Bobrovsky
Goalies
Keith Kinkaid
Mike Condon
Referees:
(Sweden) Tobias Björk
(Czech Republic) Martin Fraňo
Linesmen:
(Czech Republic) Miroslav Lhotský
(Sweden) Henrik Pihlblad

Voynov (Kalinin, Shirokov) – 06:23	1–0
Mozyakin (Datsyuk, Orlov) (PP) – 13:41	2–0
Telegin (Datsyuk, Mozyakin) – 29:36	3–0
Dadonov (Panarin, Shipachyov) – 32:49	4–0
	4–1	34:29 – Vatrano (Warsofsky, Nelson) (PP)
Panarin (Belov, Chudinov) – 35:22	5–1
	5–2	43:42 – Vatrano (Warsofsky)
Mozyakin (Datsyuk) – 53:13	6–2
Shipachyov (Dadonov, Panarin) (PP) – 59:53	7–2

10 min
Penalties
8 min
29
Shots
30

=== Gold medal game ===
22 May 2016; 20:45	Finland	0–2 (0–1, 0–0, 0–1)	Canada	VTB Ice Palace, Moscow; Attendance: 11,509

Game reference
Mikko Koskinen	Goalies	Cam Talbot	Referees: (Russia) Roman Gofman (Switzerland) Tobias Wehrli; Linesmen: (Russia) Gleb Lazarev (United States) Fraser McIntyre
0–1 / 11:24 – McDavid (Duchene); 0–2 / 59:59 – Duchene (Marchand) (ENG)			Referees: (Russia) Roman Gofman (Switzerland) Tobias Wehrli; Linesmen: (Russia) Gleb Lazarev (United States) Fraser McIntyre
6 min	Penalties	8 min	Referees: (Russia) Roman Gofman (Switzerland) Tobias Wehrli; Linesmen: (Russia) Gleb Lazarev (United States) Fraser McIntyre
16	Shots	33	Referees: (Russia) Roman Gofman (Switzerland) Tobias Wehrli; Linesmen: (Russia) Gleb Lazarev (United States) Fraser McIntyre

== Final ranking ==
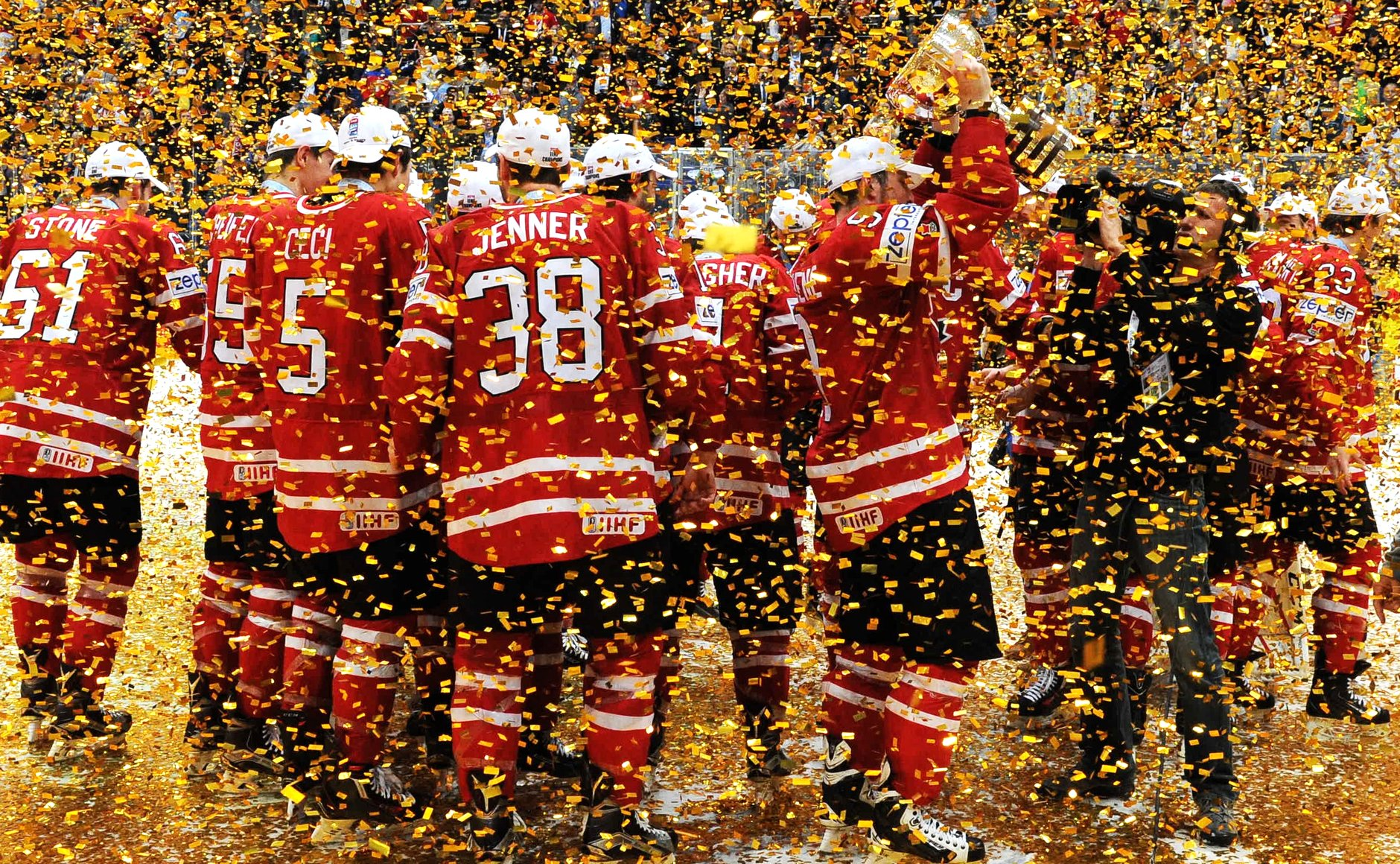
Team Canada celebrates with the cup

Pos	Grp	Team	Pld	W	OTW	OTL	L	GF	GA	GD	Pts	Final result
1	B	Canada	10	9	0	0	1	46	11	+35	27	Champions
2	B	Finland	10	9	0	0	1	37	10	+27	27	Runners-up
3	A	Russia (H)	10	8	0	0	2	44	16	+28	24	Third place
4	B	United States	10	3	1	1	5	29	30	−1	12	Fourth place
5	A	Czech Republic	8	5	1	2	0	28	14	+14	19	Eliminated in Quarter-finals
6	A	Sweden	8	3	2	0	3	23	24	−1	13	Eliminated in Quarter-finals
7	B	Germany	8	4	0	1	3	23	24	−1	13	Eliminated in Quarter-finals
8	A	Denmark	8	2	2	1	3	18	27	−9	11	Eliminated in Quarter-finals
9	B	Slovakia	7	2	1	0	4	15	23	−8	8	Eliminated in Group stage
10	A	Norway	7	2	1	0	4	13	22	−9	8	Eliminated in Group stage
11	A	Switzerland	7	1	1	3	2	20	26	−6	8	Eliminated in Group stage
12	B	Belarus	7	2	0	0	5	16	32	−16	6	Eliminated in Group stage
13	A	Latvia	7	1	0	3	3	13	22	−9	6	Eliminated in Group stage
14	B	France	7	1	1	0	5	11	23	−12	5	Eliminated in Group stage
15	B	Hungary	7	1	0	0	6	12	31	−19	3	2017 IIHF World Championship Division I
16	A	Kazakhstan	7	0	1	0	6	15	28	−13	2	2017 IIHF World Championship Division I

Source: IIHF.com
(H) Host

=== Awards and statistics ===
==== Awards ====
- Best players selected by the directorate:
  - Best Goaltender: (Finland) Mikko Koskinen
  - Best Defenceman: (Canada) Mike Matheson
  - Best Forward: (Finland) Patrik Laine

Source: IIHF.com

- Media All-Stars:
  - MVP: (Finland) Patrik Laine
  - Goaltender: (Finland) Mikko Koskinen
  - Defencemen: (Russia) Nikita Zaitsev / (Canada) Mike Matheson
  - Forwards: (Finland) Patrik Laine / (Russia) Vadim Shipachyov / (Finland) Mikael Granlund

Source: IIHF.com

=== Scoring leaders ===
List shows the top skaters sorted by points, then goals.

Player	GP	G	A	Pts	+/−	PIM	POS
(Russia) Vadim Shipachyov	10	6	12	18	+10	8	F
(Russia) Artemi Panarin	10	6	9	15	+9	4	F
(Russia) Evgenii Dadonov	10	6	7	13	+10	6	F
(Finland) Patrik Laine	10	7	5	12	+4	4	F
(Finland) Mikael Granlund	10	4	8	12	+6	2	F
(Canada) Derick Brassard	10	5	6	11	+9	4	F
(Russia) Pavel Datsyuk	10	1	10	11	+6	0	F
(Canada) Matt Duchene	10	5	5	10	+10	2	F
(Finland) Mikko Koivu	10	4	6	10	+8	12	F
(Canada) Mark Stone	10	4	6	10	+8	6	F

GP = Games played; G = Goals; A = Assists; Pts = Points; +/− = Plus/minus; PIM = Penalties in minutes; POS = Position
Source: IIHF.com

=== Goaltending leaders ===
Only the top five goaltenders, based on save percentage, who have played at least 40% of their team's minutes, are included in this list.

Player	TOI	GA	GAA	SA	Sv%	SO
(Czech Republic) Dominik Furch	255:00	4	0.94	100	96.00	2
(Finland) Mikko Koskinen	479:01	9	1.13	169	94.67	1
(Canada) Cam Talbot	480:00	10	1.25	167	94.01	4
(Denmark) Sebastian Dahm	434:04	16	2.21	248	93.55	1
(Russia) Sergei Bobrovsky	520:51	15	1.73	218	93.12	1

TOI = Time on ice (minutes:seconds); SA = Shots against; GA = Goals against; GAA = Goals against average; Sv% = Save percentage; SO = Shutouts
Source: IIHF.com

== IIHF honors and awards ==
The 2016 IIHF Hall of Fame inductees and award recipients were honored during the World Championship medal ceremonies in Moscow.

IIHF Hall of Fame inductees

- Peter Bondra, Slovakia
- Sergei Fedorov, Russia
- Valeri Kamensky, Russia
- Ville Peltonen, Finland
- Pat Quinn, Canada
- Ben Smith, United States

Award recipients

- Nikolai Ozerov of Russia posthumously received the Paul Loicq Award for outstanding contributions to international ice hockey.
- Gábor Ocskay of Hungary posthumously received the Torriani Award for a player with an outstanding career from non-top hockey nation.
