= Jarno Koskiranta =

Finnish ice hockey player

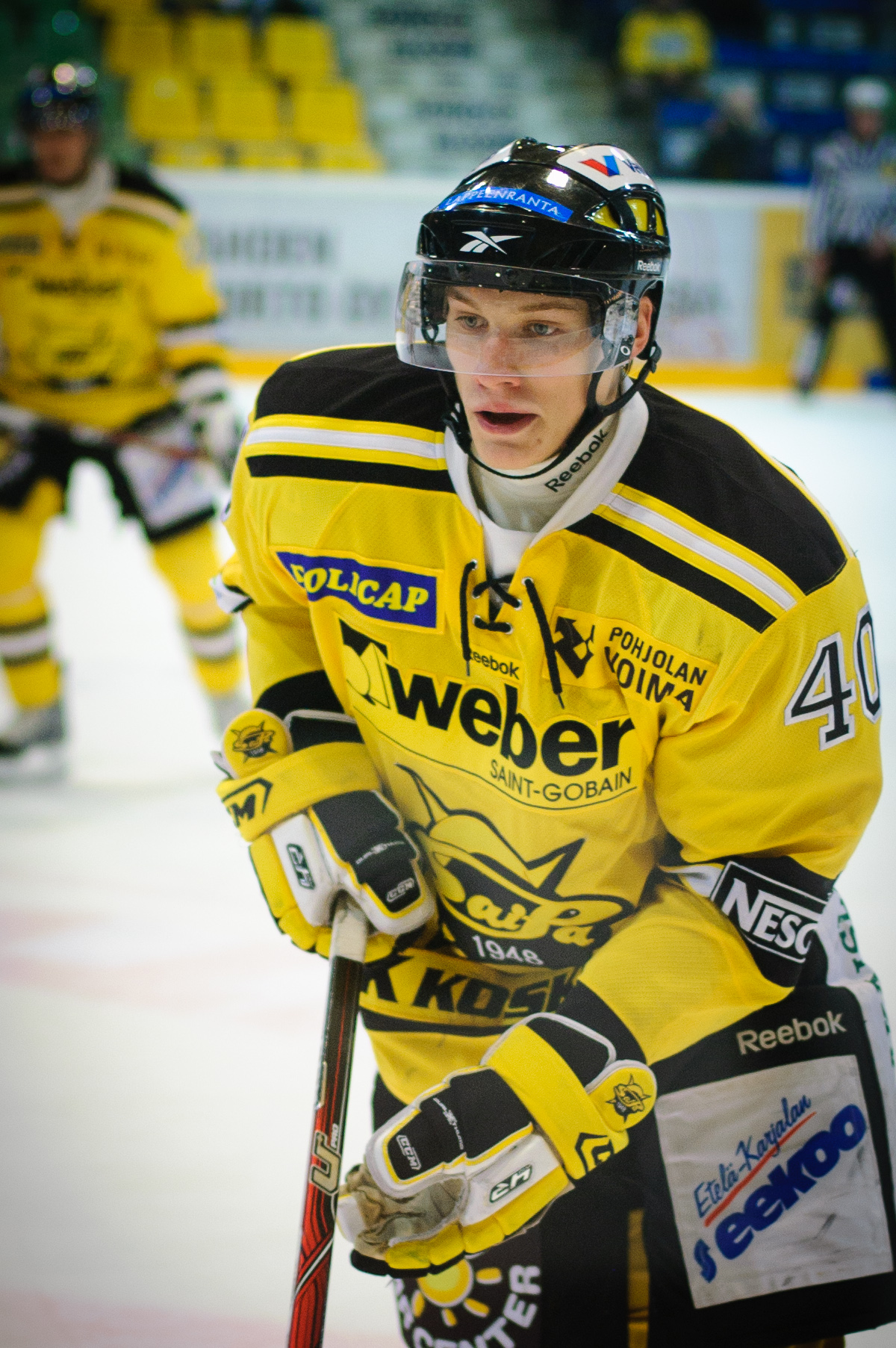
- Born: December 9, 1986 (age 38); Paimio, Finland
- Height: 6 ft 3 in (191 cm)
- Weight: 198 lb (90 kg; 14 st 2 lb)
- Position: Forward
- Shot: Left
- Liiga team Former teams: SaiPa; Tappara; Sibir Novosibirsk; SKA Saint Petersburg
- National team: Finland
- Playing career: 2007–2023

Jarno Koskiranta (born December 9, 1986) is a Finnish professional ice hockey forward. He is currently playing with SaiPa of the Liiga.

== Playing career ==
Koskiranta made his Finnish SM-liiga debut playing with SaiPa during the 2009–10 SM-liiga season. After two seasons with HC Sibir Novosibirsk on May 1, 2015, Koskiranta left to sign with newly crowned KHL champions SKA Saint Petersburg.

Koskiranta remained with SKA over the following five seasons, before returning to original Finnish club, SaiPa, on a three-year contract on 20 May 2020.

== Career statistics ==
=== Regular season and playoffs ===
			Regular season					Playoffs
Season	Team	League	GP	G	A	Pts	PIM	GP	G	A	Pts	PIM
2002–03	Kiekko–Espoo	FIN.2 U16	14	6	7	13	0	2	0	0	0	0
2003–04	GrIFK	FIN.2 U18	10	11	7	18	0	—	—	—	—	—
2003–04	GrIFK	FIN.3 U20	2	0	0	0	0	—	—	—	—	—
2004–05	Blues II	FIN U18	19	3	3	6	6	—	—	—	—	—
2005–06	Blues	FIN U20	28	2	4	6	10	10	0	0	0	2
2006–07	Blues	FIN U20	12	2	1	3	4	2	1	1	2	4
2006–07	Kiekko–Espoo	FIN.2 U20	9	7	5	12	2	—	—	—	—	—
2007–08	HC Salamat	Mestis	43	11	15	26	26	—	—	—	—	—
2008–09	Jokipojat	Mestis	45	12	17	29	24	11	4	7	11	6
2009–10	SaiPa	SM-l	58	15	16	31	28	—	—	—	—	—
2010–11	SaiPa	SM-l	60	8	24	32	20	—	—	—	—	—
2011–12	SaiPa	SM-l	60	17	22	39	26	—	—	—	—	—
2012–13	Tappara	SM-l	58	22	18	40	24	14	9	1	10	4
2013–14	Sibir Novosibirsk	KHL	54	7	6	13	20	10	2	2	4	6
2014–15	Sibir Novosibirsk	KHL	58	13	32	45	18	16	5	1	6	4
2015–16	SKA St. Petersburg	KHL	54	15	13	28	26	15	4	1	5	0
2016–17	SKA St. Petersburg	KHL	57	12	6	18	22	18	6	4	10	12
2017–18	SKA St. Petersburg	KHL	41	7	7	14	6	15	4	0	4	14
2018–19	SKA St. Petersburg	KHL	47	8	4	12	6	18	2	2	4	2
2019–20	SKA St. Petersburg	KHL	42	9	10	19	12	4	0	0	0	0
2020–21	SaiPa	Liiga	53	7	15	22	20	—	—	—	—	—
2021–22	SaiPa	Liiga	4	0	0	0	2	—	—	—	—
2022–23	SaiPa	Liiga	37	1	6	7	12	—	—	—	—	—
2022–23	Ilves	Liiga	19	1	3	4	6	11	2	3	5	0
Liiga totals			349	71	104	175	138	25	11	4	15	4
KHL totals			353	71	78	149	110	96	23	10	33	38

Medal record

Representing Finland

Ice hockey

World Championships
Silver medal – second place	2016 Russia	

=== International ===
Year	Team	Event	GP	G	A	Pts	PIM
2013	Finland	WC	10	2	1	3	2
2016	Finland	WC	10	3	1	4	0
2018	Finland	OG	5	0	2	2	0
Senior totals			25	5	4	9	2

== Awards and honors ==
Award	Year
KHL
Gagarin Cup (SKA Saint Petersburg)	2017
