= Maxim Chudinov =

Russian ice hockey player (born 1990)

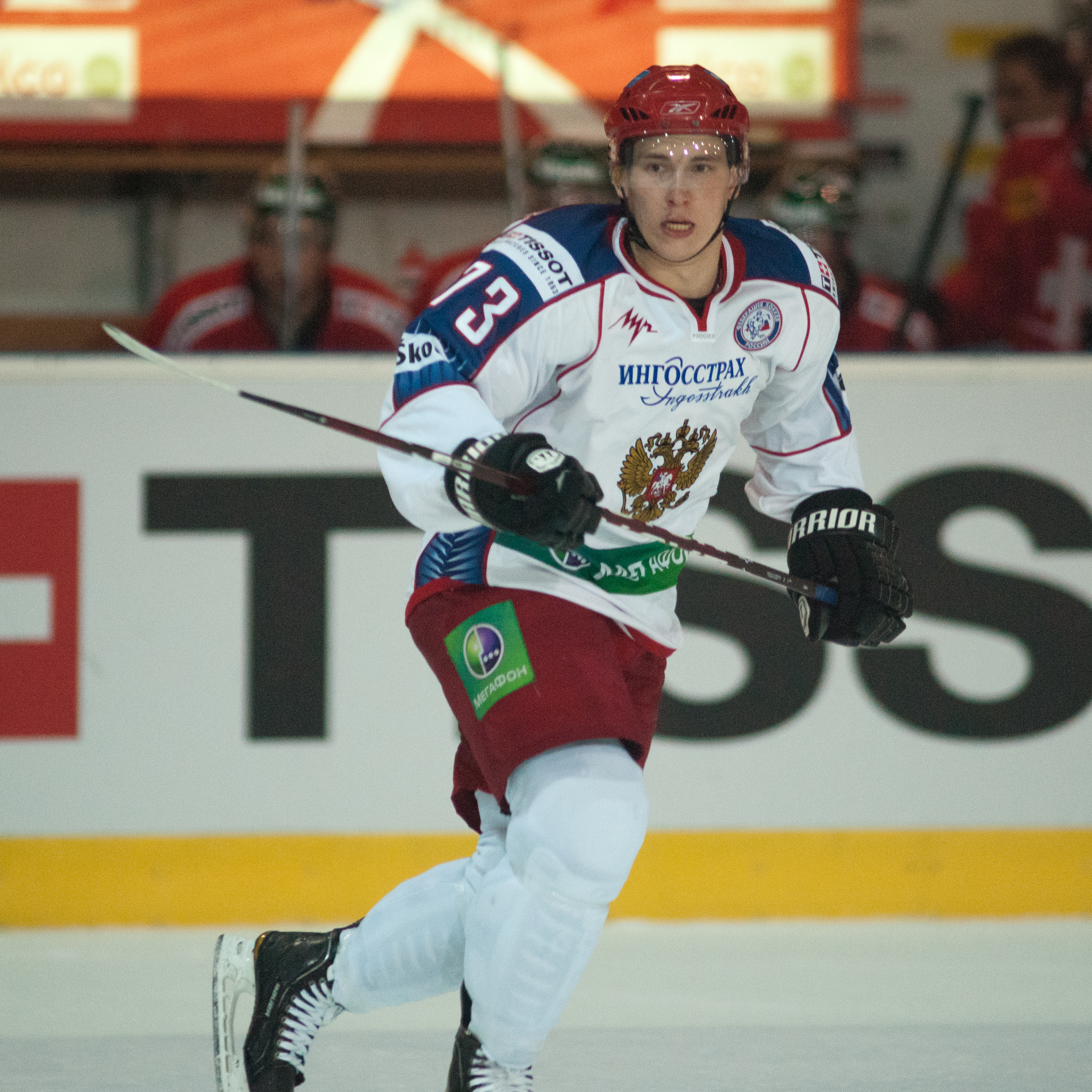
- Born: 25 March 1990 (age 36) Cherepovets, Russian SFSR, Soviet Union
- Height: 5 ft 11 in (180 cm)
- Weight: 187 lb (85 kg; 13 st 5 lb)
- Position: Defence
- Shoots: Right
- KHL team Former teams: Free agent Severstal Cherepovets; SKA Saint Petersburg; Avangard Omsk; Ak Bars Kazan; Spartak Moscow; Admiral Vladivostok
- National team: Russia
- NHL draft: 195th overall, 2010; Boston Bruins
- Playing career: 2007–present

Maxim Valeryevich Chudinov (Russian: Максим Валерьевич Чудинов; born 25 March 1990) is a Russian professional ice hockey player who is currently an unrestricted free agent. He most recently played under contract with Admiral Vladivostok of the Kontinental Hockey League (KHL). Chudinov was drafted by the Boston Bruins in the 7th round (195th overall) of the 2010 NHL entry draft.

== Playing career ==
During the 2017–18 season, his sixth with SKA Saint Petersburg, Chudinov was traded to Avangard Omsk in exchange for prospect Dmitry Zavgorodniy on October 15, 2017.

After sitting out the 2021–22 season, Chudinov attempted a return to the KHL in agreeing to a try-out deal to attend the pre-season training camp with Ak Bars Kazan on 5 July 2022.

Chudinov made the opening night roster for Ak Bars for the 2022–23 season and made 7 appearances before he was signed to a one-year contract with fellow KHL team, HC Spartak Moscow, on 22 November 2022.

In the following off-season, Chudinov left Spartak as a free agent and agreed to a one-year contract for the 2023–24 season with Admiral Vladivostok on 15 May 2023.

== Career statistics ==
=== Regular season and playoffs ===
			Regular season					Playoffs
Season	Team	League	GP	G	A	Pts	PIM	GP	G	A	Pts	PIM
2006–07	Severstal Cherepovets	RSL	2	0	0	0	0	3	0	0	0	2
2007–08	Severstal Cherepovets	RSL	18	0	0	0	10	1	0	0	0	0
2008–09	Severstal Cherepovets	KHL	25	0	0	0	14	—	—	—	—	—
2009–10	Severstal Cherepovets	KHL	47	6	8	14	30	—	—	—	—	—
2010–11	Severstal Cherepovets	KHL	52	8	15	23	30	6	0	2	2	4
2011–12	Severstal Cherepovets	KHL	52	9	26	35	62	6	0	2	2	10
2012–13	SKA Saint Petersburg	KHL	47	2	8	10	46	12	1	1	2	6
2013–14	SKA Saint Petersburg	KHL	50	7	11	18	44	10	0	1	1	11
2014–15	SKA Saint Petersburg	KHL	51	5	12	17	56	21	1	8	9	20
2015–16	SKA Saint Petersburg	KHL	56	8	10	18	87	15	1	4	5	6
2016–17	SKA Saint Petersburg	KHL	42	4	10	14	26	1	0	1	1	0
2017–18	SKA Saint Petersburg	KHL	14	0	2	2	56	—	—	—	—	—
2017–18	Avangard Omsk	KHL	31	5	11	16	50	7	2	2	4	2
2018–19	Avangard Omsk	KHL	59	9	10	19	22	19	3	4	7	4
2019–20	Avangard Omsk	KHL	12	2	2	4	6	—	—	—	—	—
2020–21	Avangard Omsk	KHL	32	2	6	8	16	2	0	1	1	2
2022–23	Ak Bars Kazan	KHL	7	0	1	1	2	—	—	—	—	—
2022–23	Spartak Moscow	KHL	33	3	2	5	24	—	—	—	—	—
2023–24	Admiral Vladivostok	KHL	40	2	8	10	24	—	—	—	—	—
KHL totals			651	72	142	214	595	99	8	26	34	65

Medal record

Representing Russia

Ice hockey

World Championships
Gold medal – first place	2014 Belarus	
Silver medal – second place	2015 Czech Republic	
Bronze medal – third place	2016 Russia	

World Junior Championships
Bronze medal – third place	2008 Czech Republic	
Bronze medal – third place	2009 Canada	

=== International ===
Year	Team	Event	Result	GP	G	A	Pts	PIM
2007	Russia	U18	1st place, gold medalist(s)	7	2	2	4	8
2008	Russia	U18	2nd place, silver medalist(s)	6	1	4	5	27
2008	Russia	WJC	3rd place, bronze medalist(s)	7	0	1	1	0
2009	Russia	WJC	3rd place, bronze medalist(s)	7	0	5	5	6
2010	Russia	WJC	6th	6	2	2	4	6
2014	Russia	WC	1st place, gold medalist(s)	10	0	1	1	4
2015	Russia	WC	2nd place, silver medalist(s)	10	1	3	4	4
2016	Russia	WC	3rd place, bronze medalist(s)	9	1	3	4	4
Junior totals				33	5	14	19	47
Senior totals				29	2	7	9	12

== Awards and honors ==
Award	Year
KHL
All-Star Game	2012, 2014
First All-Star Team	2015
Gagarin Cup (SKA Saint Petersburg)	2015, 2017
Gagarin Cup (Avangard Omsk)	2021
