= Roman Lyubimov =

Russian ice hockey player (born 1992)

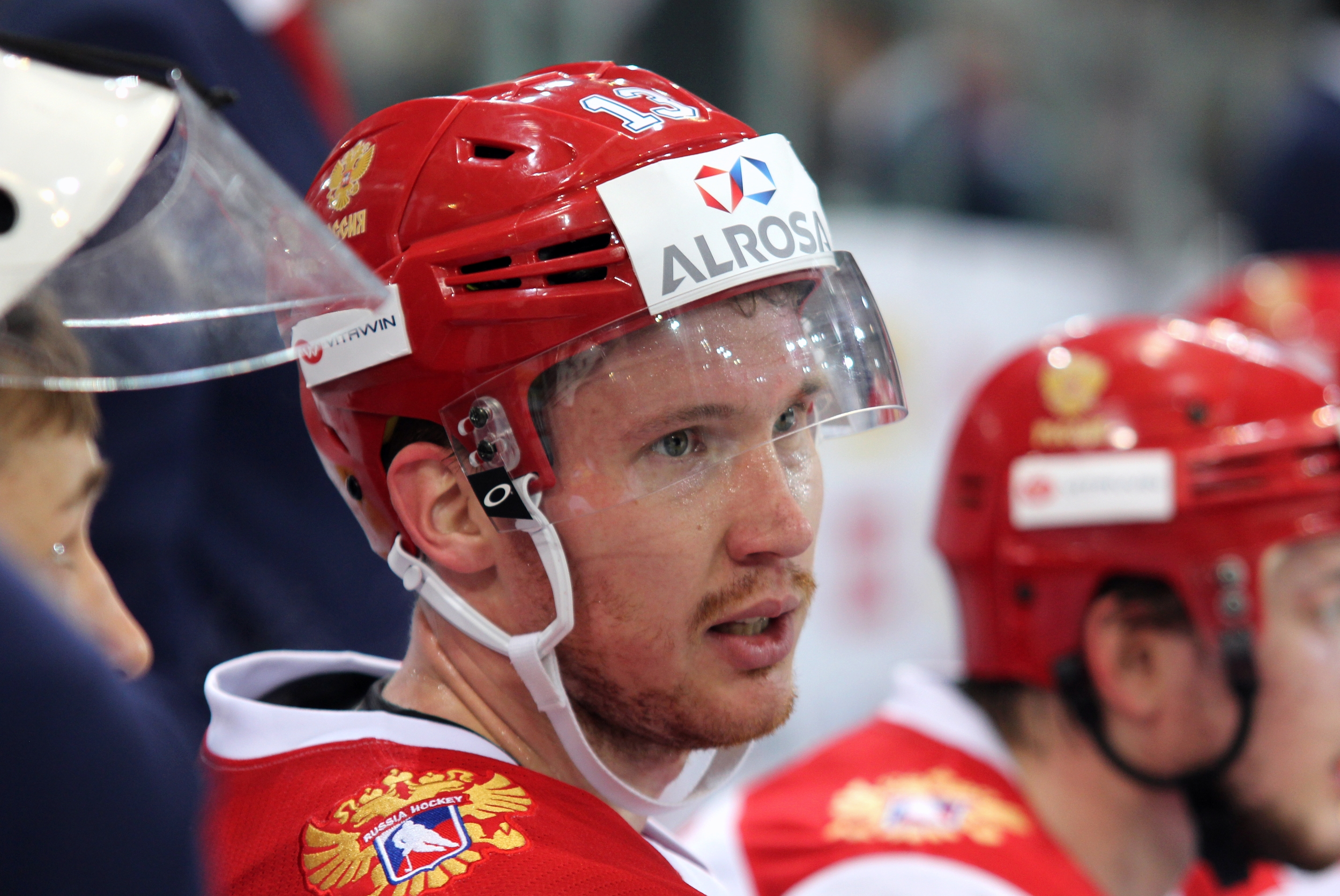
- Born: 6 January 1992 (age 34) Tver, Russia
- Height: 6 ft 2 in (188 cm)
- Weight: 207 lb (94 kg; 14 st 11 lb)
- Position: Forward
- Shoots: Right
- Ligue Magnus team Former teams: Brûleurs de Loups; CSKA Moscow; Philadelphia Flyers; Metallurg Magnitogorsk; Ak Bars Kazan; Amur Khabarovsk; Spartak Moscow
- National team: Russia
- NHL draft: Undrafted
- Playing career: 2010–present

Roman Lyubimov (born 6 January 1992) is a Russian professional ice hockey player who is currently under contract with Brûleurs de Loups of the French Synerglace Ligue Magnus.

== Playing career ==
As a youth, Lyubimov played in the 2005 Quebec International Pee-Wee Hockey Tournament with a team from Moscow. He later played exclusively within the development program of HC CSKA Moscow from the age of 15. He played the first six seasons of his pro career for CSKA in the KHL. Undrafted, and following the 2015–16 season, he agreed to sign a one-year, entry-level contract with the Philadelphia Flyers on 11 July 2016.

In the ensuing 2016–17 season, Lyubimov remained with the Flyers through training camp to make the opening night roster. As a depth forward for the Flyers, Lyubimov appeared in 47 games, totaling 4 goals and 6 points. With his rights retained by the Flyers, Lyubimov opted to return to CSKA after his solitary season in North America by signing a three-year contract on July 3, 2017.

Before the 2018–19 season, Lyubimov was released from his contract with CSKA to sign a two-year deal with Metallurg Magnitogorsk on August 23, 2018. Following the conclusion of his contract with Metallurg, Lyubimov continued in the KHL by signing a one-year deal as a free agent with HC Spartak Moscow on 10 May 2020. In the following 2020–21 season, Lyubimov split the season between Spartak, registering 5 points in 25 games, and Ak Bars Kazan, featuring in 9 games for 2 assists.

Remaining with Ak Bars in the following pre-season, Lyubimov left the club by mutual consent before the 2021–22 season on 28 August 2021. He was later signed to a one-year deal with fellow KHL outfit, Amur Khabarovsk, registering 9 points through 30 regular season games.

As a free agent, Lyubimov returned to his former club, Spartak Moscow, agreeing to a one-year contract on 4 May 2022.

== Career statistics ==
=== Regular season and playoffs ===
			Regular season					Playoffs
Season	Team	League	GP	G	A	Pts	PIM	GP	G	A	Pts	PIM
2009–10	Krasnaya Armiya	MHL	39	14	12	26	90	4	1	0	1	8
2010–11	Krasnaya Armiya	MHL	49	21	19	40	90	16	8	8	16	10
2010–11	CSKA Moscow	KHL	7	0	0	0	0	—	—	—	—	—
2011–12	Krasnaya Armiya	MHL	50	17	27	44	64	17	4	2	6	12
2011–12	CSKA Moscow	KHL	7	0	1	1	0	—	—	—	—	—
2012–13	CSKA Moscow	KHL	31	0	0	0	4	8	0	0	0	14
2012–13	THK Tver	VHL	14	6	3	9	14	—	—	—	—	—
2013–14	CSKA Moscow	KHL	42	2	4	6	6	4	0	0	0	0
2013–14	Kuban Krasnodar	VHL	2	0	1	1	0	—	—	—	—	—
2014–15	CSKA Moscow	KHL	46	6	7	13	20	12	4	2	6	29
2015–16	CSKA Moscow	KHL	52	7	7	14	25	15	4	4	8	8
2016–17	Philadelphia Flyers	NHL	47	4	2	6	8	—	—	—	—	—
2017–18	CSKA Moscow	KHL	40	5	6	11	26	11	0	0	0	2
2018–19	Metallurg Magnitogorsk	KHL	62	13	8	21	20	6	0	2	2	2
2019–20	Metallurg Magnitogorsk	KHL	61	4	6	10	53	3	0	0	0	2
2020–21	Spartak Moscow	KHL	25	3	2	5	8	—	—	—	—	—
2020–21	Khimik Voskresensk	VHL	3	1	1	2	0	—	—	—	—	—
2020–21	Ak Bars Kazan	KHL	9	0	2	2	2	—	—	—	—	—
2021–22	Amur Khabarovsk	KHL	30	3	6	9	18	—	—	—	—	—
2022–23	Spartak Moscow	KHL	43	2	1	3	10	—	—	—	—	—
2022–23	Khimik Voskresensk	VHL	11	1	1	2	6	—	—	—	—	—
KHL totals			455	45	50	95	192	59	8	8	16	57
NHL totals			47	4	2	6	8	—	—	—	—	—

Medal record

Representing Russia

Men's ice hockey

World Championships
Bronze medal – third place	2016 Russia	

=== International ===
Year	Team	Event	Result	GP	G	A	Pts	PIM
2010	Russia	WJC18	4th	7	0	1	1	6
2016	Russia	WC	3rd place, bronze medalist(s)	10	4	4	8	0
Junior totals				7	0	1	1	6
Senior totals				10	4	4	8	0

== Awards and honors ==
Award	Year
MHL
All-Star Game	2012
