= Dominik Furch =

Czech ice hockey player

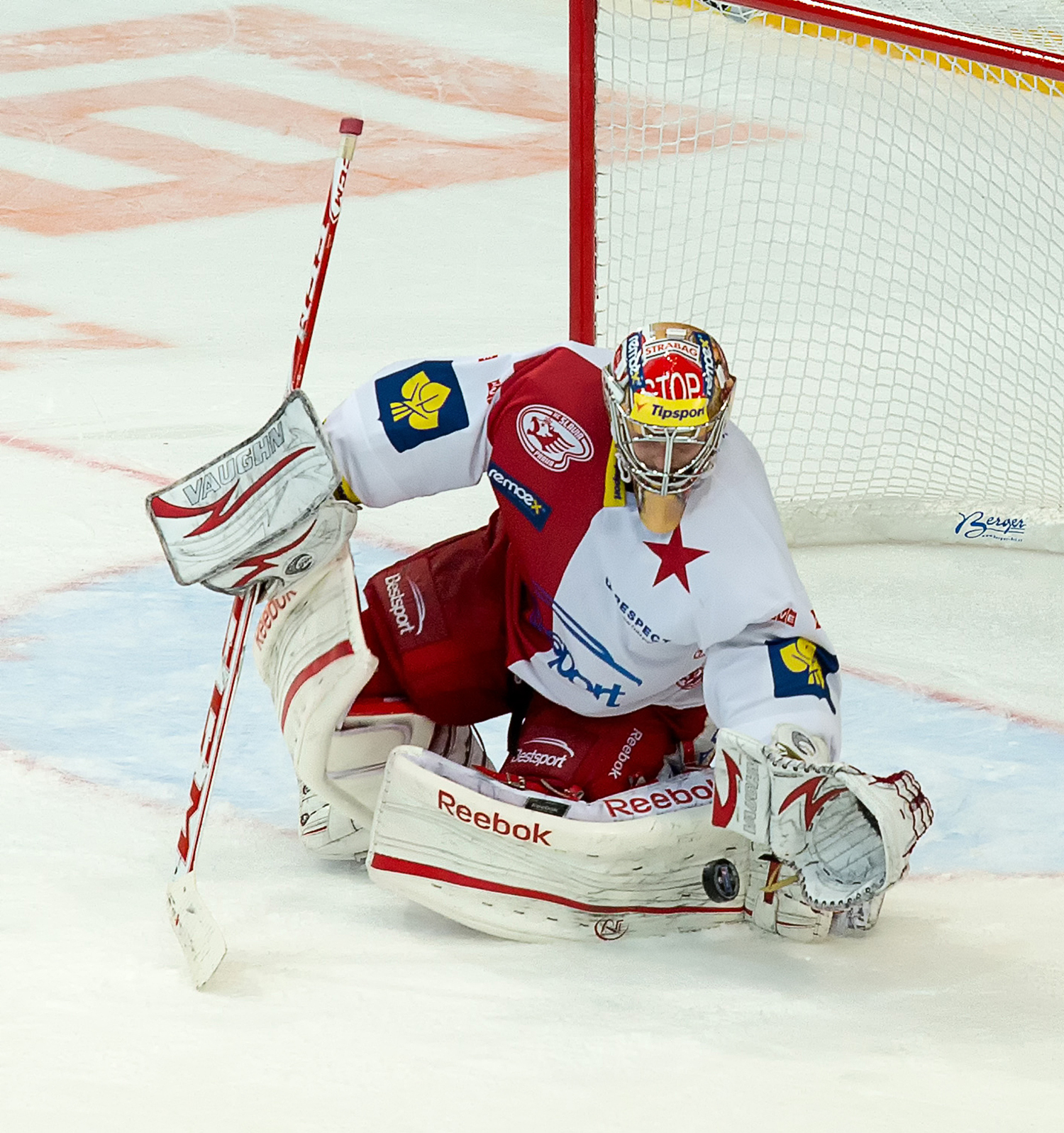
- Born: April 19, 1990 (age 34); Prague, Czechoslovakia
- Height: 188 cm (6 ft 2 in)
- Weight: 91 kg (201 lb; 14 st 5 lb)
- Position: Goaltender
- Catches: Left
- ELH team Former teams: HC Kometa Brno; HC Slavia Praha; BK Havlíčkův Brod; HC Berounští Medvědi; Avangard Omsk; Severstal Cherepovets; Örebro HK; Dinamo Minsk; HC Škoda Plzeň; Färjestad BK
- National team: Czech Republic
- Playing career: 2007–present

Dominik Furch (born April 19, 1990) is a Czech professional ice hockey goaltender who is currently playing for HC Kometa Brno of the Czech Extraliga (ELH).

== Playing career ==
He was previously under contract with Severstal Cherepovets and Avangard Omsk of the Kontinental Hockey League (KHL) and has played in the Czech Extraliga with HC Slavia Praha.

On 2 May 2019, Furch signed his first contract in Sweden as a free agent, agreeing to a one-year deal with Örebro HK of the Swedish Hockey League (SHL). As the starting goaltender for Örebro HK, Furch enjoyed a successful 2019–20 season, posting a 2.26 goals against average in 46 regular season games.

In the off-season, Furch opted to return to the KHL, agreeing to a one-year contract with Belarusian club, HC Dinamo Minsk, on 3 July 2020.
