= Sebastian Dahm =

Danish ice hockey player (born 1987)

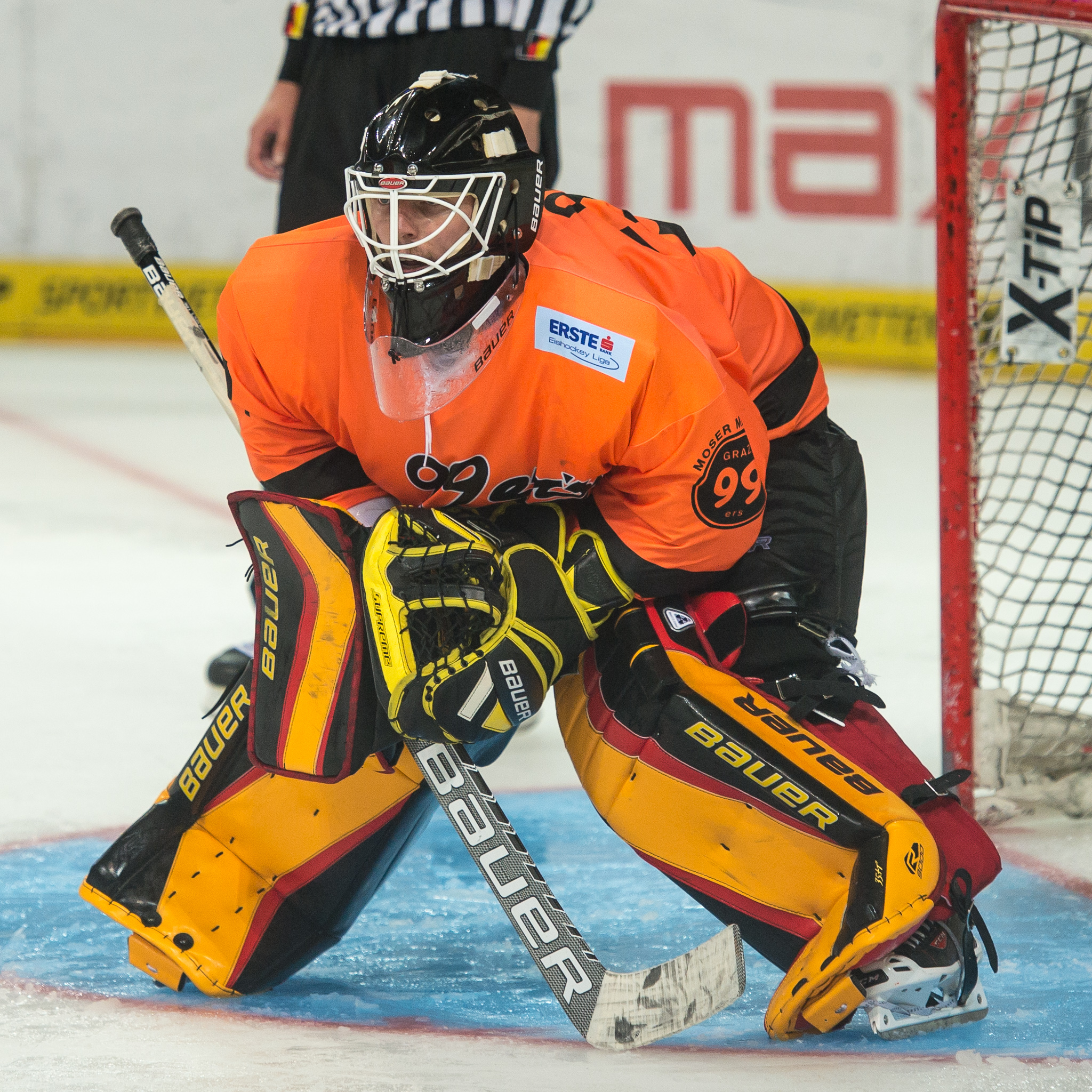
- Dahm with the Moser Medical Graz 99ers in 2015
- Born: 28 February 1987 (age 39) Copenhagen, Denmark
- Height: 6 ft 0 in (183 cm)
- Weight: 176 lb (80 kg; 12 st 8 lb)
- Position: Goaltender
- Catches: Left
- ICEHL team Former teams: EC KAC; Syracuse Crunch; Rødovre Mighty Bulls; Esbjerg IK; Graz 99ers Iserlohn Roosters; Eisbären Berlin
- National team: Denmark
- NHL draft: Undrafted
- Playing career: 2008–present

Sebastian Dahm (born 28 February 1987) is a Danish professional ice hockey goaltender who is currently playing under contract with EC KAC of the ICE Hockey League (ICEHL).

== Playing career ==
=== Junior ===
In 2003 Dahm left Denmark and moved to Swedish club, Malmö Redhawks, and played on Malmö's junior teams. In 2005 Dahm was drafted by the Belleville Bulls of the OHL. He played the 2005–06 season with the Bulls before being traded to the Sarnia Sting in the off-season. Dahm was named to the OHL Rookie second team for the 2005–06 season. During the 2006–07 season, Dahm was traded again, this time to the Sudbury Wolves. Dahm enjoyed a strong playoffs with the Wolves backstopping the team to the OHL finals, where they would eventually succumb to the Plymouth Whalers. He decided to stay with the Wolves for the 2007–08 season as an overager. During the 2007–08 OHL season, Dahm was traded again, moving to his fourth team in the OHL, the Niagara IceDogs. He is the first Danish goaltender to play in the Canadian Hockey League.

Dahm was named the CHL Goaltender of the Week for the week ending 13 January 2008 and the week ending 27 January 2008. He was also named OHL player of the week for the week ending 27 January 2008.

Following the 2008 OHL playoffs' first week, Dahm was again named the OHL player of the week for the week ending 24 March. During the week, he recorded three wins and 0 losses with two shutouts in the opening three games of their first round series versus Mississauga St. Michael's Majors. For the week, he had a 0.33 goals against average and a .989 save percentage. He was the first star in two games and the third star in the third.

=== Professional ===
Following his junior career, Dahm signed with the Columbus Blue Jackets organization and spent the 2008–09 season split between the Syracuse Crunch of the AHL and the Johnstown Chiefs of the ECHL. The following season, Dahm spent with the Alaska Aces of the ECHL, part of the season on loan with Bloomington PrairieThunder of the IHL.

Dahm did not secure a contract before the 2010–11 season and waited until the start of December to sign a short-term contract with his childhood team Rødovre Mighty Bulls. Rødovre needed instant cover as one of their goalies was injured, and another was away with the Denmark men's national junior ice hockey team for the 2011 World Junior Ice Hockey Championships Division I in Slovenia. While his stay with Rødovre was successful, the two sides could not agree on an extension of the contract, and after only two games with Rødovre, Dahm was snapped up by EfB Ishockey, another Danish League team.

In a surprising move, Dahm returned to play for Rødovre Mighty Bulls for the 2011–12 season. After four seasons with the Mighty Bulls, Dahm opted to leave the Metal Ligaen and signed a one-year contract to be the starting goaltender with Austrian club Graz 99ers of the EBEL on 20 May 2015. He later had his contract renewed for a second season. After two years in Austria, he headed to Germany, signing with the Iserlohn Roosters of the Deutsche Eishockey Liga in May 2017.

After two seasons with the Roosters, Dahm left at the conclusion of his contract, signing as a free agent to continue in the DEL with Eisbären Berlin on 15 May 2019.

== International play ==
In December 2006, Dahm played a key role as he backstopped the Danish team, playing on home ice in Odense, as it gained promotion from the World Junior Ice Hockey Championships Pool I to the top flight for the first time ever. Dahm posted a .918 save percentage and a 2.20 GAA in 5 games.

The Danish national team coach Per Bäckman has stated that provided Dahm gets sufficient playing time, he would be considered for the 2011 IIHF World Championship team Denmark roster.
