= 2024–25 FFHG Division 1 season =

2024–25 FFHG Division 1
- League: FFHG Division 1
- Sport: Ice hockey
- Duration: 5 October 2024 – 27 April 2025
- Teams: 16

Regular season
- Best record: Brûleurs de Loups
- Runners-up: Ducs d'Angers
- Promoted to Ligue Magnus: none
- Relegated to Division 2: Brest Albatros Hockey

Playoffs
- Finals champions: Épinal Hockey Club
- Runners-up: Drakkars de Caen

FFHG Division 1 seasons
- ← 2023–24 2025–26 →

The 2024–25 FFHG Division 1 season was the 27th season of FFHG Division 1 and the 94th season of second-tier professional ice hockey in France. The regular season ran from 5 October 2024 to 8 March 2025. The Épinal Hockey Club finished atop the standings. The postseason ran from 11 March to 27 April 2025. The Épinal Hockey Club defeated the Drakkars de Caen 3 games to 2 for the league championship, however, as Épinal did not submit an application for a license with Ligue Magnus, they were not promoted. The Brest Albatros Hockey finished last in the relegation round and were demoted to FFHG Division 2.

== Membership changes ==
- With Division 1 expanding from 14 to 16 teams, the two Division 2 finalists, the Ours de Villard-de-Lans and Courchevel-Méribel-Pralognan Bouquetins were both promoted to Division 1.

== Teams ==
2024–25 teams in Division 1

Team	City	Arena	Founded
Brest Albatros Hockey	Brest	Rinkla Stadium	(Canada) Claude Devèze
Drakkars de Caen	Caen	Patinoire de Caen la mer	(Slovakia) Jaroslav Prosvic
Éléphants de Chambéry	Chambéry	Patinoire de Buisson rond	(France) Alexandre Rouillard
Dogs de Cholet	Cholet	Glisséo	(France) Julien Pihant
Corsaires de Dunkerque	Dunkirk	Patinoire Michel-Raffoux	(Canada) Jonathan Lafrance
Épinal Hockey Club	Épinal	Patinoire de Poissompré	(Slovakia) Ján Plch
Yétis du Mont-Blanc	Megève; Saint-Gervais-les-Bains	Le Palais, Megève; Patinoire municipale, Saint-Gervais-les-Bains	(France) Romain Sadoine
Courchevel-Méribel-Pralognan Bouquetins	Méribel	Patinoire de Méribel	(Canada) Sylvain Codère
Les Comètes de Meudon	Meudon	UCPA Sport Station	(Canada) Kévin Arrault
Pingouins de Morzine-Avoriaz	Morzine	Škoda Arena	(France) Anthony Mortas
Corsaires de Nantes	Nantes	Centre de loisirs du Petit Port	(Canada) Alex Stein
Bisons de Neuilly-sur-Marne	Neuilly-sur-Marne	Patinoire municipale	(Czech Republic) Radek Míka
Étoile Noire de Strasbourg	Strasbourg	Patinoire Iceberg	(Canada) Daniel Bourdages
Remparts de Tours	Tours	Centre Municpial des Sports	(France) Stéphane Gros
Diables Rouges de Valenciennes	Valenciennes	Patinoire Valigloo	(France) Julien Guimard
Ours de Villard-de-Lans	Villard-de-Lans	Patinoire municipale de Villard-de-Lans	(Canada) Eric Medeiros

== Regular season ==
=== Standings ===
Pos	Team	Pld	W	OTW	OTL	L	GF	GA	GD	Pts	Qualification
1	Épinal Hockey Club	30	22	2	1	5	126	76	+50	71	Qualification to Quarterfinals
2	Corsaires de Dunkerque	30	19	2	4	5	137	87	+50	65	Qualification to Quarterfinals
3	Drakkars de Caen	30	17	3	5	5	86	63	+23	62	Qualification to Quarterfinals
4	Remparts de Tours	30	16	2	2	10	96	88	+8	54	Qualification to Quarterfinals
5	Les Comètes de Meudon	30	14	4	0	12	111	103	+8	50	Qualification to Eighthfinals
6	Yétis du Mont-Blanc	30	14	2	4	10	114	105	+9	50	Qualification to Eighthfinals
7	Étoile Noire de Strasbourg	30	12	4	2	12	91	79	+12	46	Qualification to Eighthfinals
8	Pingouins de Morzine-Avoriaz	30	12	2	6	10	103	98	+5	46	Qualification to Eighthfinals
9	Dogs de Cholet	30	12	3	3	12	87	84	+3	45	Qualification to Eighthfinals
10	Éléphants de Chambéry	30	11	3	0	16	100	111	−11	39	Qualification to Eighthfinals
11	Bisons de Neuilly-sur-Marne	30	10	2	4	14	97	110	−13	38	Qualification to Eighthfinals
12	Corsaires de Nantes (Note: Corsaires de Nantes were deprived of 9 points by a decision of the Federation.)	30	11	3	4	12	82	91	−9	34	Qualification to Eighthfinals
13	Diables Rouges de Valenciennes	30	9	2	1	18	85	109	−24	32	Qualification to Play Out
14	Brest Albatros Hockey	30	9	0	1	20	79	110	−31	28	Qualification to Play Out
15	Courchevel-Méribel-Pralognan Bouquetins	30	6	4	1	19	90	119	−29	27	Qualification to Play Out
16	Ours de Villard-de-Lans	30	5	3	3	19	70	121	−51	24	Qualification to Play Out

Updated to match(es) played on unknown. Source: Ligue Magnus
Rules for classification: 1) Points; 2) Head-to-head points.

=== Statistics ===
==== Scoring leaders ====
Player	Team	Pos	GP	G	A	Pts	PIM
(Czech Republic) Vít Budínský	Corsaires de Dunkerque	RW	29	20	35	55	24
(Canada) Zackary Daneau	Corsaires de Dunkerque	C	30	28	24	52	11
(Sweden) Pontus Eklöf	Les Comètes de Meudon	C/W	30	24	27	51	12
(Slovakia) Peter Hrehorčák	Épinal Hockey Club	W	30	23	27	50	19
(Sweden) Elliot Lorraine	Les Comètes de Meudon	C/W	29	14	32	46	36
(Belarus) Vladimir Dzhig	Yétis du Mont-Blanc	F	30	13	33	46	12
(Canada) Carson MacKinnon	Bisons de Neuilly-sur-Marne	LW	30	16	29	45	6
(France) Hugo Sarlin	Épinal Hockey Club	C/LW	30	16	29	45	29
(Slovakia) Dominik Fujerik	Épinal Hockey Club	C	30	15	30	45	14
(United States) Jeremiah Luedtke	Corsaires de Dunkerque	C/RW	29	14	29	43	14

==== Leading goaltenders ====
The following goaltenders led the league in goals against average, provided that they have played at least 1/3 of their team's minutes.

Player	Team	GP	TOI	W	L	GA	SO	SV%	GAA
(France) Ronan Quemener	Drakkars de Caen	30	1888	17	10	59	3	.943	1.88
(France) Antoine Bonvalot	Épinal Hockey Club	17	1025	12	3	37	2	.925	2.17
(France) Sébastien Raibon	Remparts de Tours	25	1508	14	9	62	2	.925	2.47
(Sweden) Simon Zurawski	Pingouins de Morzine-Avoriaz	21	1213	12	7	50	3	.908	2.47
(Canada) Mark Grametbauer	Dogs de Cholet	29	1736	11	14	74	4	.925	2.56
(Slovakia) Tomáš Hiadlovský	Étoile Noire de Strasbourg	30	1809	12	14	77	1	.901	2.56

== Playoffs ==
=== Championship ===
Eighthfinals (best-of-3)
5	Les Comètes de Meudon	1	4*	4
12	Corsaires de Nantes	2	3	3
6	Yétis du Mont-Blanc	0	3	1
11	Bisons de Neuilly-sur-Marne	2	2	0
7	Étoile Noire de Strasbourg	5	1	4
10	Éléphants de Chambéry	3	5	1
8	Pingouins de Morzine-Avoriaz	3	3	-
9	Dogs de Cholet	7	6	-

Quarterfinals (best-of-5)
1	Épinal Hockey Club	3	3	3*	1	6
9	Dogs de Cholet	1	5	2	2	3
4	Remparts de Tours	8	3	0	2	4
5	Les Comètes de Meudon	1	2	4	3	2
2	Corsaires de Dunkerque	3	4*	1	4	6
7	Étoile Noire de Strasbourg	2	3	2**	5*	7*
3	Drakkars de Caen	3	2	2	1	5*
6	Yétis du Mont-Blanc	1	3	0	2	4

Semifinals (best-of-5)
1	Épinal Hockey Club	2	5	2	1	-
4	Remparts de Tours	0	2	4	0	-
(Pairings are re-seeded after the first round)
7	Étoile Noire de Strasbourg	1	2*	5	3	4
3	Drakkars de Caen	3	1	1	4	7

Championship (best-of-5)
1	Épinal Hockey Club	3	3	2	3*	3
3	Drakkars de Caen	1	7	3*	2	0

Note: * denotes overtime
Note: ** denotes overtime and shootout

=== Relegation ===
Semifinals (best-of-5)
13	Diables Rouges de Valenciennes	4**	6	5	-	-
16	Ours de Villard-de-Lans	3	3	4	-	-
14	Brest Albatros Hockey	1	4	3	2	-
15	Courchevel-Méribel-Pralognan Bouquetins	4	0	4*	3	-

Finals (best-of-5)
16	Ours de Villard-de-Lans	0	3*	3	2	-
14	Brest Albatros Hockey	1	2	1	0	-

Note: * denotes overtime
Note: ** denotes overtime and shootout
