= 2023–24 FFHG Division 1 season =

2023–24 FFHG Division 1
- League: FFHG Division 1
- Sport: Ice hockey
- Duration: 10 October 2023 – 21 April 2024
- Number of teams: 14

Regular season
- Best record: Corsaires de Nantes
- Runners-up: Ducs d'Angers
- Promoted to Ligue Magnus: none
- Relegated to Division 2: none

Playoffs
- Finals champions: Corsaires de Nantes
- Runners-up: Éléphants de Chambéry

FFHG Division 1 seasons
- ← 2022–23 2024–25 →

The 2023–24 FFHG Division 1 season was the 28th season of FFHG Division 1 and the 93rd season of second-tier professional ice hockey in France. The regular season ran from 10 October 2023 to 6 March 2024. The Corsaires de Nantes finished atop the standings. The postseason ran from 16 March to 21 April 2024. The Corsaires de Nantes defeated the Éléphants de Chambéry 3 games to 2 for the league championship, however, as Nantes did not submit an application for a license with Ligue Magnus, they were not promoted. The Diables Rouges de Valenciennes finished last in the relegation round, however, as the league was set to expand by 2 teams for the 2024–25 season, no demotion occurred.

== Membership changes ==
- The Spartiates de Marseille were promoted to Ligue Magnus. The Diables Rouges de Briançon were slated to take their place in Division 1, however, due to the bankruptcy of Scorpions de Mulhouse, Briançon remained in the top division. Because Mulhouse was dropped to Division 2, the league offered their potential spot in the league was available for another Division 2 team. In the end, the Diables Rouges de Valenciennes were able to purchase a license and joined Division 1.
- The Vipers de Montpellier were relegated to Division 2 and replaced by Les Comètes de Meudon.

== Teams ==
2023–24 teams in Division 1

Team	City	Arena	Founded
Brest Albatros Hockey	Brest	Rinkla Stadium	(Finland) Tommy Flinck
Drakkars de Caen	Caen	Patinoire de Caen la mer	(France) Julien Guimard
Éléphants de Chambéry	Chambéry	Patinoire de Buisson rond	(Canada) Pierre Bergeron
Dogs de Cholet	Cholet	Glisséo	(France) Julien Pihant
Corsaires de Dunkerque	Dunkirk	Patinoire Michel-Raffoux	(Canada) Jonathan Lafrance
Épinal Hockey Club	Épinal	Patinoire de Poissompré	(Slovakia) Ján Plch
Yétis du Mont-Blanc	Megève; Saint-Gervais-les-Bains	Le Palais, Megève; Patinoire municipale, Saint-Gervais-les-Bains	(France) Etienne Croz (France) Rémi Peronnard
Les Comètes de Meudon	Meudon	UCPA Sport Station	(Canada) Kévin Arrault
Pingouins de Morzine-Avoriaz	Morzine	Škoda Arena	(France) Anthony Mortas
Corsaires de Nantes	Nantes	Centre de loisirs du Petit Port	(Canada) Martin Lacroix
Bisons de Neuilly-sur-Marne	Neuilly-sur-Marne	Patinoire municipale	(Canada) Serge Forcier
Étoile Noire de Strasbourg	Strasbourg	Patinoire Iceberg	(Canada) Daniel Bourdages
Remparts de Tours	Tours	Centre Municpial des Sports	(Canada) Frank Spinozzi
Diables Rouges de Valenciennes	Valenciennes	Patinoire Valigloo	(France) Romain Sadoine

== Regular season ==
=== Standings ===
Pos	Team	Pld	W	OTW	OTL	L	GF	GA	GD	Pts	Qualification
1	Corsaires de Nantes (Note: Corsaires de Nantes were deprived of 6 points by a decision of the Federation.)	26	20	0	2	4	117	49	+68	56	Qualification to Playoffs
2	Drakkars de Caen	26	14	5	3	4	109	65	+44	55	Qualification to Playoffs
3	Épinal Hockey Club	26	14	5	1	6	97	80	+17	53	Qualification to Playoffs
4	Corsaires de Dunkerque	26	13	4	2	7	119	79	+40	49	Qualification to Playoffs
5	Étoile Noire de Strasbourg	26	12	4	2	8	91	71	+20	46	Qualification to Playoffs
6	Remparts de Tours	26	10	3	3	10	89	79	+10	39	Qualification to Playoffs
7	Éléphants de Chambéry	26	11	3	0	12	84	89	−5	39	Qualification to Playoffs
8	Dogs de Cholet	26	10	1	5	10	99	101	−2	37	Qualification to Playoffs
9	Les Comètes de Meudon	26	6	6	6	8	95	108	−13	36	Missed Playoffs
10	Bisons de Neuilly-sur-Marne	26	8	3	4	11	94	103	−9	34	Missed Playoffs
11	Brest Albatros Hockey	26	8	3	2	13	84	116	−32	32	Qualification to Play Out
12	Yétis du Mont-Blanc	26	7	0	8	11	78	115	−37	29	Qualification to Play Out
13	Diables Rouges de Valenciennes	26	5	3	2	16	81	111	−30	23	Qualification to Play Out
14	Pingouins de Morzine-Avoriaz	26	3	1	1	21	75	146	−71	12	Qualification to Play Out

Updated to match(es) played on unknown. Source: Ligue Magnus
Rules for classification: 1) Points; 2) Head-to-head points.

=== Statistics ===
==== Scoring leaders ====
Player	Team	Pos	GP	G	A	Pts	PIM
(United States) Jeremiah Luedtke	Corsaires de Nantes	C/RW	26	15	31	46	28
(Czech Republic) Mikuláš Bícha	Drakkars de Caen	LW	26	10	30	40	14
(Canada) Joé Dubé	Brest Albatros Hockey	C	26	20	18	38	10
(France) Joseph Broutin	Corsaires de Dunkerque	C	26	11	27	38	16
(Canada) Marc Beckstead	Drakkars de Caen	C/RW	26	21	16	37	18
(Czech Republic) Vít Budínský	Corsaires de Dunkerque	RW	24	20	16	36	43
(Russia) Ilya Altybarmakyan	Diables Rouges de Valenciennes	F	25	17	19	36	22
(Canada) Félix Chamberland	Drakkars de Caen	LW	26	15	21	36	26
(Canada) Raphaël Bastille	Bisons de Neuilly-sur-Marne	LW	16	13	23	36	18
(United States) Max Kaufman	Les Comètes de Meudon	F	23	20	15	35	16
(Slovakia) Peter Hrehorčák	Épinal Hockey Club	W	26	16	19	35	22
(France) Gauthier Gibert	Corsaires de Nantes	RW	26	15	20	35	12
(Russia) Alexei Mikhnov	Brest Albatros Hockey	LW/RW	25	14	21	35	38
(Latvia) Gatis Sprukts	Dogs de Cholet	C/LW	26	8	27	35	12

==== Leading goaltenders ====
The following goaltenders led the league in goals against average, provided that they have played at least 1/3 of their team's minutes.

Player	Team	GP	TOI	W	L	GA	SO	SV%	GAA
(Poland) Michael Luba	Corsaires de Nantes	25	1468	19	4	40	7	.946	1.64
(France) Sébastien Raibon	Remparts de Tours	19	1053	7	7	40	2	.924	2.28
(France) Ronan Quemener	Drakkars de Caen	26	1563	14	6	61	2	.936	2.34
(Slovakia) Tomáš Hiadlovský	Étoile Noire de Strasbourg	26	1576	12	9	68	1	.917	2.59
(France) Antoine Bonvalot	Épinal Hockey Club	21	1239	12	4	54	1	.910	2.62

== Playoffs ==
=== Championship ===
Quarterfinals (best-of-5)
1	Corsaires de Nantes	5	6	3	5	-
8	Dogs de Cholet	2	0	4	3	-
4	Corsaires de Dunkerque	5	3	2	4	5
5	Étoile Noire de Strasbourg	2	5	3*	1	2
3	Épinal Hockey Club	2	6	2	-	-
6	Remparts de Tours	1	0	0	-	-
2	Drakkars de Caen	1	3*	2	1	-
7	Éléphants de Chambéry	4	2	3	3	-

Semifinals (best-of-5)
1	Corsaires de Nantes	0	4	7	4	-
4	Corsaires de Dunkerque	3	1	5	3	-
3	Épinal Hockey Club	2	3**	0	3	-
7	Éléphants de Chambéry	3	2	4	6	-

Championship (best-of-5)
1	Corsaires de Nantes	4	1	3	4*	5
7	Éléphants de Chambéry	2	2	4*	3	2

Note: * denotes overtime
Note: ** denotes overtime and shootout

=== Relegation ===
Home \ Away	BRE	MON	MOR	VAL	BRE	MON	MOR	VAL
Brest Albatros Hockey	—	5–2	1–2	2–3	—	4–8	3–7	4–3
Yétis du Mont-Blanc	2–5	—	5–4 ^{(OT)}	1–4	8–4	—	4–3	5–2
Pingouins de Morzine-Avoriaz	2–1	4–5 ^{(OT)}	—	3–1	7–3	3–4	—	6–2
Diables Rouges de Valenciennes	3–2	4–1	1–3	—	3–4	2–5	2–6	—

Updated to match(es) played on Final. Source: Ligue Magnus
Legend: Blue = home team win; Yellow = draw; Red = away team win.

Pos	Team	Pld	W	OTW	OTL	L	GF	GA	GD	Pts	Qualification
1	Brest Albatros Hockey (Note: Teams retained their points from regular season common games.)	6	2	0	0	4	19	25	−6	23	Saved
2	Yétis du Mont-Blanc	6	3	1	0	2	25	22	+3	19	Saved
3	Pingouins de Morzine-Avoriaz	6	4	0	1	1	25	16	+9	17	Saved
4	Diables Rouges de Valenciennes	6	2	0	0	4	15	21	−6	13	Saved

Updated to match(es) played on unknown. Source: Ligue Magnus
Rules for classification: 1) Points; 2) Head-to-head points.
