= Courchevel-Méribel-Pralognan Bouquetins =

- City: Méribel, France
- League: FFHG Division 1
- Founded: 1964
- Home arena: Patinoire de Méribel
- Colors: Blue, white, gray

Franchise history
- 1964–1985: Pralognan-la-Vanoise
- 1985–1990: Tarentaise
- 1990–2017: Hockey Club Val Vanoise
- 2017–present: Hockey Courchevel-Méribel-Pralognan

Championships
- Regular season titles: 2014, 2015
- Division titles: 2014, 2015, 2024
- FFHG Division 2: 1980, 2015

The Hockey Courchevel-Méribel-Pralognan (Les Bouquetins) are a French professional ice hockey team in Méribel, that plays in FFHG Division 1.

== History ==
Originally founded in 1964 as 'Pralognan-la-Vanoise', the ice hockey club played out of the second French league for its first nine years. In 1973 the third French league was founded with Pralognan-la-Vanoise becoming a founding member. The club remained with the league until 1980 when they won their first championship and earned a promotion back to the second league. The team didn't have much success after their return, having to save themselves in relegation four times over the next five years. However, in 1985, just before relegation was set to begin, the team withdrew from the league and announced their merger with Hockey Club Méribel. The combined team, called 'Tarentaise' remained in the second league for one season before being relegated in 1986. In 1990 the team merged with a third club, Courchevel, to form 'Hockey Club Val Vanoise'.

Val Vanoise had an up-and-down stretch throughout the 90s, avoiding relegation several times while also making a few appearances in the final group. In 2002, French hockey was reorganized and Val Vanoise was assigned to FFHG Division 1. Unfortunately, the team lost in relegation and ended up dropping all the way down to the fourth French league. It took a few years for Val Vanoise to recover but they were able to take advantage of an opening in Division 2 in 2009. In just six years, the club won its second championship and returned to Division 1. Two years later, Val Vanoise rebranded as Hockey Courchevel-Méribel-Pralognan (HCMP) referencing the three separate clubs that merged to form the current team. However, the name change didn't seem to do the team any favors as they were relegated in their first year under the new name.

Courchevel-Méribel-Pralognan was one of the top teams in Division 2. They finished as the league runners-up in both 2019 and 2024 and had opportunities for promotion on both occasions. In 2019, they were unable to accept due to financial constraints, however, they were able to return to Division 1 in 2024.

== Season-by-season results ==
Since 2010

=== Hockey Club Val Vanoise ===
| Season | GP | W | OTW | OTL | L | Pts | GF | GA | Finish | Playoffs |
|---|---|---|---|---|---|---|---|---|---|---|
| 2010–11 | 18 | 4 | 0 | 3 | 11 | 11 | 77 | 107 | 10th of 10, Group B 16th of 20, Division 2 | Won Relegation Round-Robin, 2–1–2–1 |
| 2011–12 | 18 | 11 | 1 | 1 | 5 | 25 | 98 | 73 | t-3rd of 10, Group B t-5th of 20, Division 2 | Won First Round series, 15–11 (Jets d'Évry-Viry); Lost Quarterfinal series, 4–16 (Remparts de Tours) |
| 2012–13 | 16 | 10 | 1 | 1 | 4 | 23 | 103 | 71 | t-2nd of 9, Group B t-4th of 18, Division 2 | Lost First Round series, 9–16 (Éléphants de Chambéry) |
| 2013–14 | 16 | 9 | 5 | 2 | 0 | 30 | 95 | 58 | 1st of 9, Group A 1st of 18, Division 2 | Won First Round series, 2–0 (Étoile Noire de Strasbourg); Won Quarterfinal series, 2–0 (Sangliers Arvernes de Clermont-Ferrand); Lost Semifinal series, 0–2 (Remparts de Tours) |
| 2014–15 | 16 | 15 | - | 0 | 1 | 30 | 106 | 45 | 1st of 10, Poule B t-1st of 20, Division 2 | Won First Round series, 2–0 (Jets d'Évry-Viry); Won Quarterfinal series, 2–0 (Taureaux de feu de Limoges); Won Semifinal series, 2–0 (Jokers de Cergy-Pontoise); Won Championship series, 2–0 (Aigles de La Roche-sur-Yon) |
| 2015–16 | 26 | 9 | 2 | 1 | 14 | 32 | 94 | 122 | 9th of 14, Division 1 | Won Play-down Semifinal series, 2–0 (Aigles de La Roche-sur-Yon) |
| 2016–17 | 24 | 8 | 3 | 4 | 9 | 34 | 77 | 78 | 8th of 13, Division 1 | Won Quarterfinal series, 2–1 (Diables Rouges de Briançon); Lost Semifinal series, 1–2 (Brest Albatros Hockey) |

=== Hockey Courchevel-Méribel-Pralognan ===
| Season | GP | W | OTW | OTL | L | Pts | GF | GA | Finish | Playoffs |
|---|---|---|---|---|---|---|---|---|---|---|
| 2017–18 | 26 | 5 | 3 | 4 | 14 | 25 | 71 | 109 | 13th of 14, Division 1 | Lost Relegation series, 0–2 (Jokers de Cergy-Pontoise) |
| 2018–19 | 18 | 13 | 0 | 3 | 2 | 42 | 94 | 49 | 2nd of 10, Poule B 3rd of 20, Division 2 | Won First Round series, 2–0 (Les Comètes de Meudon); Won Quarterfinal series, 2–0 (Lions de Wasquehal); Won Semifinal series, 2–1 (Renards de Roanne); Lost Championship series, 0–2 (Sangliers Arvernes de Clermont-Ferrand) |
| 2019–20 | 18 | 9 | 2 | 1 | 6 | 32 | 92 | 60 | 4th of 10, Poule B 8th of 20, Division 2 | Won First Round series, 2–1 (Moselle Amnéville Hockey Club); Lost Quarterfinal series, 0–2 (Épinal Hockey Club) |
| 2020–21 | 2 | 1 | 0 | 0 | 1 | 3 | 10 | 6 | N/A | postseason cancelled |
| 2021–22 | 18 | 9 | 2 | 1 | 6 | 32 | 105 | 82 | t-3rd of 10, Poule B t-5th of 20, Division 2 | Won First Round series, 2–0 (Lions de Wasquehal); Won Quarterfinal series, 2–1 (Diables Rouges de Valenciennes); Lost Semifinal series, 0–2 (Pingouins de Morzine-Avoriaz) |
| 2022–23 | 18 | 11 | 1 | 0 | 6 | 35 | 96 | 56 | 3rd of 10, Poule B 6th of 20, Division 2 | Won First Round series, 2–0 (Dragons de Rouen II); Won Quarterfinal series, 2–1 (Diables Rouges de Valenciennes); Lost Semifinal series, 0–3 (Les Grizzlys de Vaujany) |
| 2023–24 | 18 | 13 | 1 | 0 | 4 | 40 | 93 | 69 | 1st of 10, Poule B 2nd of 20, Division 2 | Won First Round series, 2–0 (Jets d'Évry-Viry); Won Quarterfinal series, 2–0 (Renards de Roanne); Won Semifinal series, 3–0 (Les Grizzlys de Vaujany); Lost Championship series, 1–3 (Ours de Villard-de-Lans) |
| 2024–25 | 30 | 6 | 4 | 1 | 19 | 27 | 90 | 119 | 15th of 16, Division 1 | Won Relegation Semifinal series, 3–1 (Brest Albatros Hockey) |
