= Michal Divíšek =

Czech ice hockey defenceman

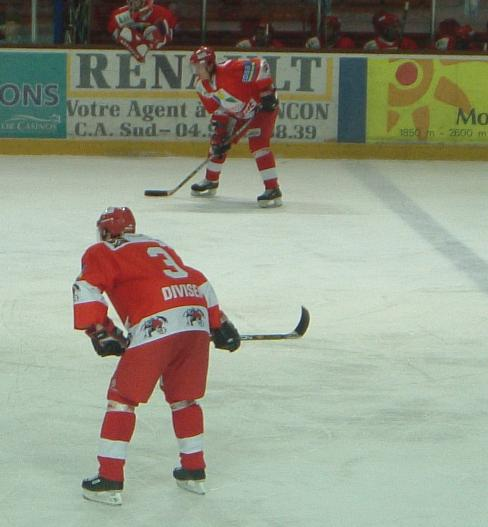
- Michal Divíšek
- Born: April 22, 1976 (age 50) Hořice, Czechoslovakia
- Height: 6 ft 0 in (183 cm)
- Weight: 205 lb (93 kg; 14 st 9 lb)
- Position: Defence
- Shot: Right
- Played for: Stadion Hradec Králové; HC Vsetín; HC Dukla Jihlava; HC Karlovy Vary; HC Pardubice; HC Litvínov; HC Havířov Panthers; HC Plzeň; Diables Rouges de Briançon; Diables Noirs de Tours
- Playing career: 1993–2010

Michal Divíšek (born April 22, 1976) is a Czech former professional ice hockey defenceman.

Divísek began his career with Stadion Hradec Králové and played one game for the team during the 1993–94 Czech Extraliga season. He then moved to North America to play in the junior Canadian Hockey League system, where he was drafted 26th overall by the Western Hockey League's Seattle Thunderbirds in the 1994 CHL Import Draft.

After two seasons in the WHL, Divíšek returned to the Czech Extraliga and played 249 regular season games over the next seven seasons, playing for HC Vsetín, HC Dukla Jihlava, HC Karlovy Vary, HC Pardubice, HC Litvínov, HC Havířov Panthers and HC Plzeň. He would also play in France's Ligue Magnus for Diables Rouges de Briançon and Diables Noirs de Tours.

Since 2008, Divíšek has worked as a coach in France, beginning with a player-coach role at Peaux Rouges d'Evry in France's third-tier FFHG Division 2. He retired in 2010 and became an assistant coach for Aigles de Nice of Division 1. In 2018, he became head coach for Division 3 side Ducs de Dijon.

== Career statistics ==
			Regular season					Playoffs
Season	Team	League	GP	G	A	Pts	PIM	GP	G	A	Pts	PIM
1991–92	Mountfield HK U18	Czechoslovakia U18	36	7	18	25	—	—	—	—	—	—
1993–94	HC Stadion Hradec Králové	Czech	1	0	0	0	0	—	—	—	—	—
1994–95	Seattle Thunderbirds	WHL	61	0	21	21	83	4	0	1	1	10
1995–96	Seattle Thunderbirds	WHL	69	10	42	52	91	5	1	2	3	6
1996–97	HC Vsetin	Czech	46	2	8	10	56	9	2	2	4	24
1997–98	HC Vsetin	Czech	33	0	5	5	12	5	0	1	1	2
1998–99	HC Dukla Jihlava	Czech	33	1	3	4	36	—	—	—	—	—
1999–00	HC Karlovy Vary	Czech	47	2	4	6	52	—	—	—	—	—
2000–01	HC Pardubice	Czech	41	3	4	7	44	5	0	0	0	6
2001–02	HCM Slovan Rosice	Czech2	29	1	7	8	28	—	—	—	—	—
2001–02	HC Chemopetrol	Czech	9	0	0	0	8	—	—	—	—	—
2002–03	HC Plzen	Czech	30	2	2	4	28	—	—	—	—	—
2002–03	HC Havirov Panthers	Czech	10	0	0	0	6	—	—	—	—	—
2003–04	Diables Rouges de Briançon	France	25	2	10	12	92	4	1	0	1	6
2004–05	Diables Rouges de Briançon	Ligue Magnus	27	10	7	17	91	4	0	2	2	6
2005–06	HC Havirov Panthers	Czech2	27	1	6	7	36	—	—	—	—	—
2005–06	Neumarkt/Egna	Italy2	17	4	1	5	28	3	0	1	1	4
2006–07	Remparts de Tours	France2	28	4	11	15	106	—	—	—	—	—
2007–08	Remparts de Tours	Ligue Magnus	26	7	7	14	44	5	1	2	3	6
2008–09	Jets de Viry-Essonne	France3	17	12	6	18	22	2	0	2	2	18
2009–10	Jets de Viry-Essonne	France3	18	5	11	16	24	2	0	3	3	29
Czech totals			250	10	26	36	242	20	2	3	5	32
