= Dogs de Cholet =

- City: Cholet, France
- League: FFHG Division 1
- Founded: 1976
- Home arena: Glisséo
- Colors: Red, black, gray

Championships
- FFHG Division 2: 1997, 2013

The Dogs de Cholet (Les Dogs) are a French professional ice hockey team in Cholet, that plays in FFHG Division 1.

== History ==
The Dogs de Cholet began in the French third league some time in the mid-1970s. While it isn't clear what their inaugural year was, the team was active at least by the 1976–77 season. The club played in the league until 1982 when they withdrew from the league. The team was brought back in 1986 when the French fourth league was created. In 1994, the team received a promotion back to Division 2. Just 4 years later, the Dogs won the league championship and joined Division 1 (French second league) for the first time. The team was not very successful following their first championship, saving themselves in relegation several times before finally dropping back down to Division 2 in 2001. It took the club quite a bit longer to earn their second championship but, in 2013, Cholet won their second title and were promoted back to FFHG Division 1. Since then, the team has been a middling team but usually makes an appearance in the league playoffs. (as of 2025)

== Season-by-season results ==
Since 2013

=== Division 1 ===
Season	GP	W	OTW	OTL	L	Pts	GF	GA	Finish	Playoffs
2013–14	26	11	1	3	11	27	79	82	8th	Lost Quarterfinal series, 0–2 (LHC Les Lions)
2014–15	24	8	0	1	15	17	71	86	11th	missed postseason
2015–16	26	17	4	1	4	60	110	72	2nd	Lost Quarterfinal series, 1–2 (Drakkars de Caen)
2016–17	24	11	0	3	10	36	86	93	7th	Lost Quarterfinal series, 0–2 (Scorpions de Mulhouse)
2017–18	26	9	0	6	11	33	89	103	10th	missed postseason
2018–19	26	12	0	6	8	42	89	85	7th	Lost Quarterfinal series, 2–3 (Jokers de Cergy-Pontoise)
2019–20	26	7	1	7	11	30	99	117	12th	relegation cancelled
2020–21	12	3	4	0	5	17	41	39	3rd in group A	missed postseason
2021–22	26	17	1	2	6	55	109	58	2nd	Won Quarterfinal series, 3–1 (Épinal Hockey Club); Won Semifinal series, 3–0 (Corsaires de Nantes); Lost Championship series, 1–3 (Brest Albatros Hockey)
2022–23	26	11	2	5	8	42	83	63	7th	Lost Quarterfinal series, 1–3 (Drakkars de Caen)
2023–24	26	10	1	5	10	37	99	101	8th	Lost Quarterfinal series, 1–3 (Corsaires de Nantes)
2024–25	30	12	3	3	12	45	87	84	9th	Lost Quarterfinal series, 2–3 (Épinal Hockey Club)
