= Les Comètes de Meudon =

- City: Meudon, France
- League: FFHG Division 1
- Founded: 1982
- Home arena: Patinoire de Meudon
- Colors: Red, gold, black

Championships
- Regular season titles: 2022

Les Comètes de Meudon (Eng: Meudon Comets) are a French professional ice hockey team in Meudon, that plays in FFHG Division 1.

== History ==
The town of Meudon saw its first ice hockey team in 1976 as part of the larger municipal sports federation. The club played in various leagues in the late 1970s and early 80s before establishing itself as a fully independent club in 1982. While initially established in the French third league, the Meudon Hockey Club ran into trouble and were out of the league by 1984. When the French fourth league was established in 1986, Meudon was one of the founding teams an they remained with the league for nearly two decades.

In 2003, French professional hockey was reorganized and Meudon received a promotion back to the third league. The club was largely unsuccessful, facing relegation many times over the next five years. In both 2006 and 2008, Meudon was scheduled to be demoted back to the fourth league, however, they were able to remain in the third league thanks to other teams folding. Eventually the club was able to change fortune in their favor and became a consistent playoff team beginning in 2009. In 2020, Meudon rose to the top of the league. Though the COVID-19 pandemic caused the cancellation of the postseason that season, the club remained in good standing afterwards. After finishing as the league runners-up in 2023, Meudon was able to take advantage of an opening in the French second league and accepted a promotion to FFHG Division 1 for the first time.

== Season-by-season results ==
Since 2010

Season	GP	W	OTW	OTL	L	Pts	GF	GA	Finish	Playoffs
FFHG Division 2
2010–11	18	5	1	1	11	13	74	93	t–7th of 10, Poule B t-12th of 20, Division 2	Last 16 loss
2011–12	18	8	2	1	7	21	73	62	5th of 10, Poule A 10th of 20, Division 2	Quarterfinal loss
2012–13	16	5	2	1	8	15	50	66	6th of 9, Poule A 11th of 18, Division 2	Last 16 loss
2013–14	16	6	1	2	7	16	52	59	4th of 9, Poule A 10th of 18, Division 2	Quarterfinal loss
2014–15	16	9	-	0	7	18	57	57	t-3rd of 9, Poule A t-7th of 18, Division 2	Quarterfinal loss
2015–16	16	9	0	0	7	27	78	68	5th of 9, Poule B t-8th of 18, Division 2	Last 16 loss
2016–17	18	4	2	2	10	18	61	77	7th of 10, Poule A 16th of 20, Division 2	Eighthfinal loss
2017–18	16	8	1	1	6	27	66	57	t-4th of 10, Poule A t-9th of 20, Division 2	Eighthfinal loss
2018–19	18	8	0	1	9	25	83	77	7th of 10, Poule A 12th of 20, Division 2	Eighthfinal loss
2019–20	18	14	0	1	3	43	81	43	2nd of 10, Poule A 3rd of 20, Division 2	Postseason cancelled
2020–21	2	2	0	0	0	6	11	5	1st of 10, Poule A t-2nd of 20, Division 2	Postseason cancelled
2021–22	18	16	1	0	1	50	108	41	1st of 10, Poule A 1st of 20, Division 2	Quarterfinal loss
2022–23	18	11	2	2	3	39	97	59	3rd of 10, Poule A t-4th of 20, Division 2	Final loss
FFHG Division 1
2023–24	26	6	6	6	8	36	95	108	9th of 14, Division 1	Did not qualify
2024–25	30	14	4	0	12	50	111	103	5th of 16, Division 1	Won Eighthfinal series, 2–1 (Corsaires de Nantes); Lost Quarterfinal series, 2–3 (Remparts de Tours)
