= 2006–07 FFHG Division 1 season =

The 2006–07 FFHG Division 1 season was contested by 16 teams, and saw the Diables Noirs de Tours win the championship. They were promoted to the Ligue Magnus as result. The Corsaires de Dunkerque, Jokers de Cergy-Pontoise and Jets de Viry-Châtillon were relegated to FFHG Division 2.

== Regular season ==
=== Northern Group ===
	Team	GP	W	T	L	Goals	Diff.	Pts
1	Coqs de Courbevoie	14	12	0	2	81 - 48	+33	24
2	Bisons de Neuilly-sur-Marne	14	8	2	4	52 - 44	+8	18
3	Galaxiens d'Amnéville	14	8	1	5	65 - 47	+18	17
4	Anges du Vésinet	14	7	2	5	53 - 48	+5	16
5	Chiefs de Garges-lès-Gonnesse	14	7	0	7	51 - 48	+3	14
6	Jokers de Cergy	14	5	2	7	44 - 56	-12	12
7	Jets de Viry	14	3	1	10	29 - 51	-22	7
8	Corsaires de Dunkerque	14	2	0	12	35 - 68	-33	4

=== Southern Group ===
	Team	GP	W	T	L	Goals	Diff.	Pts
1	Diables Noirs de Tours	14	13	0	1	77 - 29	+48	26
2	Rapaces de Gap	14	9	2	3	75 - 46	+29	20
3	Vipers de Montpellier	14	5	3	6	57 - 60	-3	13
4	Lynx de Valence	14	6	0	8	38 - 52	-14	12
5	Castors d’Avignon	14	4	3	7	41 - 45	-4	11
6	Boxers de Bordeaux	14	4	3	7	50 - 65	-15	11
7	Chevaliers du Lac d’Annecy	14	4	2	8	43 - 64	-21	10
8	Taureaux de Feu de Limoges	14	3	3	8	36 - 56	-20	9

== Second round ==
=== Final round ===
	Team	GP	W	T	L	Goals	Diff.	Pts
1	Diables Noirs de Tours	14	12	2	0	63 - 21	+42	26
2	Rapaces de Gap	14	8	2	4	68 - 53	+15	18
3	Coqs de Courbevoie	10	7	3	4	58 - 52	+6	17
4	Bisons de Neuilly-sur-Marne	14	7	2	5	55 - 40	+15	16
5	Galaxiens d'Amnéville	14	6	3	5	59 - 61	-2	15
6	Lynx de Valence	14	4	2	8	53 - 68	-15	10
7	Vipers de Montpellier	14	2	2	10	43 - 57	-14	6
8	Anges du Vésinet	14	1	2	11	37 - 84	-47	4

=== Relegation round ===
	Team	GP	W	T	L	Goals	Diff.	Pts
1	Castors d’Avignon	14	9	2	3	59 - 34	+25	20
2	Boxers de Bordeaux	14	7	4	3	58 - 50	+8	18
3	Chevaliers du Lac d’Annecy	14	7	3	4	53 - 49	+4	17
4	Chiefs de Garges-lès-Gonnesse	14	5	4	5	48 - 48	0	14
5	Taureaux de Feu de Limoges	14	5	4	5	51 - 52	-1	14
6	Corsaires de Dunkerque	14	5	3	6	52 - 55	-3	13
7	Jokers de Cergy	14	4	4	6	46 - 49	-3	12
8	Jets de Viry-Châtillon	14	0	4	10	39 - 69	-30	4

==== Relegation ====
- Taureaux de Feu de Limoges - Albatros de Brest 7:4/7:6
