= List of CBR Brave players =

The CBR Brave is an ice hockey team based in Canberra, ACT, Australia and is a member of the Australian Ice Hockey League (AIHL). Founded in 2014 to replace the defunct Canberra Knights, the Brave's first season in the AIHL was 2014. Canberra have qualified for AIHL Finals eight times and won two championship titles (Goodall Cup) and four premiership titles (H Newman Reid Trophy). The Brave have signed 113 players in the team's history, 99 skaters and 14 goaltenders, and dressed 107 of them for at least one AIHL game. Six signed players have never dressed for a Brave game, including two skaters and four goaltenders.

== Legend ==
Goaltenders
GP	Games played	G	Goals	A	Assists
PIM	Penalties in minutes	SO	Shutouts	MP	Minutes played
GA	Goals against	GAA	Goals against average	SH	Shots faced
SA	Saves made	SV%	Save percentage	GK	Goaltender

Skaters
GP	Games played	G	Goals	A	Assists
Pts	Points	PPG	Points per game average	PIM	Penalties in minutes
Pos	Position	F	Forward	D	Defenceman
LW	Left winger	RW	Right winger	C	Centre

Statistics complete as of the end of the 2023 AIHL season (2023 CBR Brave season).

== Goaltenders ==
#
#
1
2
3
4
5
6
7
8
9
10
11
12
13
14
15
16

Name	1st Nat	2nd Nat	Seasons	GP	G	A	PIM	SO	MP	GA	GAA	SH	SA	SV%	GP	G	A	PIM	SO	MP	GA	GAA	SH	SA	SV%	Notes
Name	1st Nat	2nd Nat	Seasons	Regular season											Finals											Notes
Matt Climie	(Canada)		2019	20	0	4	4	1	953	42	2.20	480	438	0.913	1	0	0	0	0	50	6	6.00	40	34	0.850	2019 AIHL goaltender of the year
Jakob Doornbos	(Australia)		2018-19	1	0	0	0	0	20	2	5.00	12	10	0.833	—											
Nickolas Eckhardt	(Australia)		2014-19	—											—											
Luke Fiveash	(Australia)		2022	—											—											
Andrew Glass	(Australia)		2023	—											—											
Matt Hewitt	(Canada)		2018	26	0	3	2	2	1182	46	1.95	614	568	0.925	2	0	0	0	0	108	5	2.31	66	61	0.924	First Brave shutout
Wylie Hodder	(Australia)		2022	—											—											
Brad Hunt	(Australia)		2014	4	0	0	0	0	100	13	6.50	67	54	0.806	—											2nd Brave head coach
Petri Pitkänen	(Finland)		2014	25	0	1	4	0	1227	72	2.93	764	692	0.906	1	0	0	0	0	50	6	6.00	40	34	0.850	2014 AIHL goaltender of the year
Victor Sjodin	(Australia)	(United States)	2024	—											—											
Alexandre Tetreault	(Australia)	(Canada)	2015-24	58	0	3	4	1	2583	156	3.02	1287	1131	0.879	2	0	0	0	0	120	3	1.25	50	47	0.940	
Tynan Theobald	(Australia)		2018	1	0	0	0	0	4	3	37.50	5	2	0.400	—											
Aleksi Toivonen	(Australia)	(Finland)	2015–17, 2022-24	79	0	4	2	0	3921	269	3.43	2229	1960	0.879	7	0	0	0	0	375	17	2.27	215	198	0.921	
Josh Unice	(United States)		2015	14	0	1	2	0	679	42	3.09	533	491	0.921	—											3rd Brave head coach
Lachlan White	(Australia)		2024	—											—											
Stuart Woodall	(Australia)		2014-15	7	0	0	0	0	218	21	4.82	133	112	0.842	—											

== Skaters ==
#
#
1
2
3
4
5
6
7
8
9
10
11
12
13
14
15
16
17
18
19
20
21
22
23
24
25
26
27
28
29
30
31
32
33
34
35
36
37
38
39
40
41
42
43
44
45
46
47
48
49
50
51
52
53
54
55
56
57
58
59
60
61
62
63
64
65
66
67
68
69
70
71
72
73
74
75
76
77
78
79
80
81
82
83
84
85
86
87
88
89
90
91
92
93
94
95
96
97
98
99
100
101
102
103
104
105
106
107
108

Name	1st Nat	2nd Nat	Pos	Seasons	GP	G	A	Pts	PPG	PIM	GP	G	A	Pts	PPG	PIM	Notes
Name	1st Nat	2nd Nat	Pos	Seasons	Regular season						Finals						Notes
Austin Albrecht	(United States)		LW	2023	19	39	37	76	4.0	14	2	1	1	2	1.0	0	
Maximilian Astner	(Germany)		F	2024	—						—						
Spencer Austin	(Australia)	(Canada)	D	2019	2	0	1	1	0.5	0	—						
Brian Bales	(Australia)	(United States)	C	2017	21	10	30	40	1.9	8	2	1	1	2	1.0	2	
Corey Banks	(Australia)		F	2017	1	0	0	0	0.0	0	—						
David Bell	(Australia)		D	2014	17	0	0	0	0.0	0	1	0	0	0	0.0	0	
Art Bidlevskii	(Canada)		D	2016	6	0	3	3	0.5	0	—						
Stephen Blunden	(Canada)		LW	2014-17	78	108	122	230	2.9	220	5	6	3	9	1.8	37	
William Bourgault	(Australia)		F	2017	—						—						
Zachary Boyle	(Australia)		D	2016	27	1	8	9	0.3	10	2	0	0	0	0.0	0	
Nicola Brandi	(Switzerland)	(Italy)	LW	2016	10	8	6	14	1.4	14	2	0	1	1	0.5	0	
Channing Bresciani	(Canada)		D	2018	24	3	42	45	1.9	48	2	0	2	2	1.0	0	
Declan Bronte	(Australia)		D	2022	16	3	8	11	0.7	8	2	0	1	1	0.5	0	
Jordan Brunt	(Australia)		F	2015-24	99	4	16	20	0.2	8	4	0	1	1	0.3	0	
Matt Buskas	(Canada)	(Australia)	D	2017–19, 2024	32	2	3	5	0.2	117	1	0	0	0	0.0	0	
Harrison Byers	(Australia)		C	2014-16	65	6	7	13	0.2	321	3	0	0	0	0.0	2	
James Byers	(Australia)		D	2014-18	126	6	27	33	0.3	98	8	0	0	0	0.0	8	
Andy Camenzind	(Australia)	(Switzerland)	C/D	2019-23	40	30	47	77	1.9	30	5	0	3	3	0.6	8	
Austin Cangelosi	(United States)		C	2024	—						—						
Jacob Carey	(New Zealand)		C	2024	—						—						
Nick Christensen	(Australia)		F/D	2019-24	58	6	19	25	0.4	18	5	0	0	0	0.0	0	
Aaron Clayworth	(Australia)		D	2014-15	44	1	9	10	0.2	40	1	0	0	0	0.0	0	
Garret Cockerill	(United States)		D	2022	6	6	6	12	2.0	12	2	0	2	2	1.0	4	
Darren Cope	(Australia)		F	2014	1	0	0	0	0.0	0	—						
Timothy Cox	(Australia)		D	2016	4	0	0	0	0.0	0	—						
Wehebe Darge	(Australia)		LW/RW	2017-22	88	69	116	185	2.1	100	7	3	10	13	1.9	8	2018 AIHL Local Player of the year
Hayden Dawes	(Australia)	(Canada)	RW	2018-19	43	23	33	56	1.3	93	3	0	2	2	0.7	6	
Nicholas Doornbos	(Australia)		D	2019-22	21	2	1	3	0.1	6	1	0	0	0	0.0	0	
Jordan Draper	(Canada)		LW/RW	2019	15	17	28	45	3.0	20	—						
David Dunwoodie	(Australia)	(New Zealand)	D/F	2015	20	4	18	22	1.1	120	1	0	0	0	0.0	4	
Jean Dupuy	(Canada)		C/W	2024	—						—						
Lachlan Fahmy	(Australia)		D	2023-24	26	2	10	12	0.5	18	2	0	0	0	0.0	0	
Darcy Flanagan	(Australia)		D	2018	15	0	1	1	0.1	8	—						
Jesse Gabrielle	(Canada)		LW	2019	19	37	26	63	3.3	50	1	1	2	3	3.0	0	
Jackson Gallagher	(Australia)		D	2019-24	48	3	7	10	0.2	2	4	0	0	0	0.0	0	
Jordan Gavin	(Australia)		F	2014-18	87	14	10	24	0.3	84	6	0	0	0	0.0	4	Captain (2016)
Kelly Geoffrey	(Canada)		LW	2015	21	28	33	61	2.9	40	1	1	2	3	3.0	0	
Trevor Gerling	(United States)		RW	2018	24	24	43	67	2.8	12	2	3	1	4	2.0	10	2018 AIHL Top Scorer & Finals MVP
Matt Gilpin	(Australia)		D/F	2016	4	0	0	0	0.0	0	—						
Mike Giorgi	(Australia)	(Canada)	D	2014–15, 2019-23	50	5	27	32	0.6	73	4	0	1	1	0.3		
Per Daniel Göransson	(Australia)	(Sweden)	D	2018	21	4	10	14	0.7	65	2	0	0	0	0.0	0	
Mathieu Guertin	(Canada)		LW	2016	20	18	31	49	2.5	86	—						
Jeff Harvey	(New Zealand)	(Canada)	F	2014	12	1	1	2	0.2	2	—						
Matthew Harvey	(New Zealand)	(Canada)	D/C	2014–19, 2023-24	145	44	86	130	0.9	181	11	1	1	2	0.2	6	Captain (2018–19)
Mitchell Henning	(Australia)		F	2016-24	138	22	44	66	0.5	69	6	1	2	3	0.5	0	
Joseph Hughes	(Australia)		RW	2018-23	57	41	53	94	1.6	150	7	6	3	9	1.3	2	2022 Finals MVP
Dominic Jalbert	(Canada)		D	2017	28	16	37	53	1.9	72	2	1	4	5	2.5	0	
Ryan Johnson	(United States)	(Australia)	F	2014-16	54	5	5	10	0.2	195	1	0	0	0	0.0	0	
Adam Kambeitz	(Canada)		C/LW	2019	24	12	20	32	1.3	55	1	0	1	1	1.0	0	
Anton Kokkonen	(Finland)		F	2014	25	17	42	59	2.4	18	1	0	1	1	1.0	10	
Bayley Kubara	(Australia)		D	2017-24	104	10	37	47	0.5	137	9	2	0	2	0.2	8	2017 AIHL Rookie of the year
Casey Kubara	(Australia)		RW	2016-24	130	83	140	223	1.7	78	9	3	2	5	0.6	2	2016 AIHL Rookie & Local Player of the year; 2022 MVP & Local player
Toby Kubara	(Australia)		F	2017, 2022-24	42	0	2	2	0.0	14	4	0	0	0	0.0	0	
Tyler Kubara	(Australia)		F	2015-24	151	44	74	118	0.8	100	9	2	1	3	0.3	0	
Matthew Lehoczky	(Australia)		F	2014	20	2	1	3	0.2	16	1	0	0	0	0.0	0	
Tom Letki	(Australia)		F	2014-17	26	0	1	1	0.0	4	1	0	0	0	0.0	0	
Chris Leveille	(Canada)		RW	2018	15	20	27	47	3.1	47	2	1	2	3	1.5	0	
David Lewis	(Australia)		F	2014–15, 2018-19	66	1	4	5	0.1	10	3	0	0	0	0.0	2	
Jayden Lewis	(Australia)		F	2015, 2018-19	29	0	8	8	0.3	12	1	0	0	0	0.0	0	
Lynden Lodge	(Australia)		F	2022	6	2	3	5	0.8	4	2	0	2	2	1.0	2	
Brayden Low	(Canada)		C	2019	7	8	9	17	2.4	35	—						
Matti Luoma	(Australia)	(Finland)	RW	2014, 2016-17	18	3	7	10	0.6	2	3	0	0	0	0.0	0	
Joseph Maatouk	(Australia)		D/F	2019-24	33	4	0	4	0.1	4	1	0	0	0	0.0	0	
Tomas Manco	(Australia)	(Czech Republic)	D	2015	23	0	6	6	0.3	20	1	0	0	0	0.0	0	
Matthew Marasco	(United States)	(Australia)	D	2022, 2024	9	1	0	1	0.1	16	1	0	0	0	0.0	0	
Kyle Mariani	(Canada)		D	2015	24	10	18	28	1.2	46	1	0	1	1	1.0	16	
Cameron Marks	(Canada)		D	2023-24	23	6	20	26	1.1	16	2	0	0	0	0.0	0	
Bodhi Matthew	(Australia)		D	2024	—						—						
Tyler Mayea	(Canada)		D	2019	7	0	9	9	1.3	6	—						
Justin Maylan	(Canada)		C	2024	—						—						
Brandon McNally	(Italy)	(United States)	LW/RW	2022	—						—						Named in EP roster but never joined the team after representing Italy at the 2022 IIHF World Championship.
Christopher McPhail	(Australia)		D/F	2014, 2017-18	68	11	7	18	0.3	12	4	0	0	0	0.0	0	
Kai Miettinen	(Australia)	(Finland)	F	2014-24	203	46	60	106	0.5	212	13	1	2	3	0.2	8	Captain (2022–Present)
Ricki Miettinen	(Australia)	(Finland)	F	2023-24	9	0	2	2	0.2	0	—						
Luke Moore	(Australia)		D	2016	17	0	0	0	0.0	0	—						
Hamish Murray	(Australia)		F	2019-22	14	0	0	0	0.0	0	1	0	0	0	0.0	0	
Mathieu Ouellette	(Canada)		LW	2014	22	17	40	57	2.6	16	1	0	0	0	0.0	0	
Ben Pagett	(Australia)		D	2014-15	5	0	0	0	0.0	2	—						
Jordan Peddle	(Canada)		C	2015	7	2	8	10	1.4	24	—						
Luke Philps	(Australia)		F	2016-17	20	1	0	1	0.1	2	—						
Scott Pitt	(Canada)		C	2015	19	18	24	42	2.2	18	—						
Felix Plouffe	(Canada)		C	2023	23	20	44	64	2.8	10	2	1	1	2	1.0	0	
Ainars Podzins	(Latvia)	(Russia)	LW	2018	17	16	19	35	2.1	22	—						
Matthew Price	(Australia)		D	2019-22	35	2	12	14	0.4	10	3	0	0	0	0.0	0	
Neal Prokop	(Canada)		C	2016	20	16	14	30	1.5	8	1	0	1	1	1.0	0	
Alastair Punler	(Australia)		D	2022	6	0	7	7	1.2	10	—						
Shai Rabinowitz	(Australia)	(Canada)	F	2014	19	0	2	2	0.1	4	1	0	0	0	0.0	0	
Jacob Ratcliffe	(New Zealand)		LW	2024	—						—						
Alain Riesen	(Australia)	(Switzerland)	F	2014-15	18	0	2	2	0.1	8	2	0	0	0	0.0	0	
Conor Riley	(United States)		F/D	2019	13	7	19	26	2.0	30	1	0	2	2	2.0	0	
Jake Riley	(Australia)		F	2023	3	0	2	2	0.7	0	2	0	0	0	0.0	0	
Mark Rummukainen	(Australia)		D	2014-19	110	7	29	36	0.3	122	5	0	2	2	0.4	0	Captain (2014–15, 2017)
Jonatan Ruth	(Sweden)		F/D	2024	—						—						
Jan Safar	(Czech Republic)		D	2016-17	44	15	59	74	1.7	124	4	3	3	6	1.5	8	2016 AIHL Defenceman of the year
Lachlan Seary	(Australia)		F	2019	7	0	0	0	0.0	0	—						
Thomas Steven	(Australia)	(New Zealand)	F	2024	—						—						
Christopher Stoikos	(Canada)		F	2023	6	4	7	11	1.8	2	—						
Darren Taylor	(Australia)		D	2014	1	0	0	0	0.0	0	—						
Peter Taylor	(Australia)		D/F	2014-15	44	1	5	6	0.1	26	1	0	0	0	0.0	0	
Mario Valery-Trabucco	(Canada)		C	2022	15	20	26	46	3.1	22	2	0	2	2	1.0	4	
Carson Vance	(United States)		D	2023	19	10	33	43	2.3	8	2	0	1	1	0.5	0	
Derek Walker	(Canada)		F	2014	1	0	0	0	0.0	12	—						
Corey Wilkie	(Canada)		F	2014	5	4	0	4	0.8	10	—						
Chris Williamson	(Switzerland)	(Canada)	C	2019	1	0	0	0	0.0	0	—						
Jamie Woodman	(Australia)		D	2022	2	1	3	4	2.0	2	—						
Geordie Wudrick	(Canada)		LW	2016-17	45	40	64	104	2.3	62	4	4	3	7	1.8	12	
Charlie York	(Australia)		F	2022-24	33	4	9	13	0.4	20	2	0	0	0	0.0	0	
Henry York	(Australia)		C	2022-24	20	1	1	2	0.1	4	2	0	0	0	0.0	0	
