= Marko Halonen =

Finnish ice hockey defencman

- Born: August 26, 1967 (age 57); Helsinki, Finland
- Height: 5 ft 11 in (180 cm)
- Weight: 203 lb (92 kg; 14 st 7 lb)
- Position: Defence
- Shot: Left
- Played for: Jokerit; Kiekko-Espoo; HPK; Brest Albatros Hockey
- Playing career: 1988–2001

Marko Halonen (born August 15, 1967) is a Finnish former professional ice hockey defenceman.

Halonen played 179 games in the SM-liiga for Jokerit, Kiekko-Espoo and HPK. He won a championship in 1992 with Jokerit. Halonen also played in France for Brest Albatros Hockey.
