= Nicolas Favarin =

French ice hockey defenceman

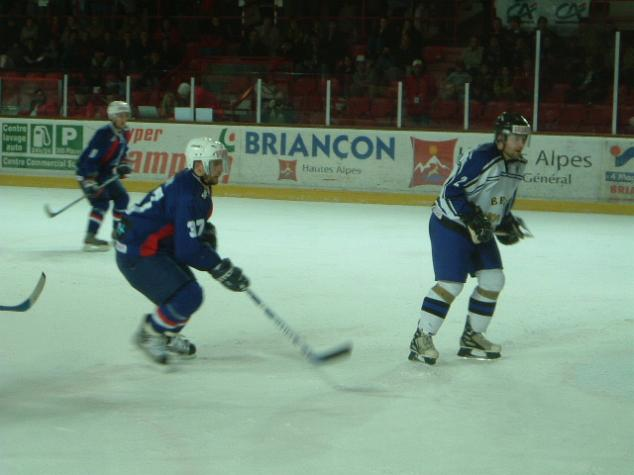
- Nicolas favarin
- Born: April 29, 1980 (age 44); Saint-Martin-d'Hères, France
- Height: 5 ft 10 in (178 cm)
- Weight: 183 lb (83 kg; 13 st 1 lb)
- Position: Defence
- Shoots: Right
- FFHG Division 1 team Former teams: Brest Albatros Hockey; Ours de Villard-de-Lans; Brûleurs de Loups; Gothiques d'Amiens
- National team: France
- Playing career: 1997–present

Nicolas Favarin (born April 29, 1980) is a French professional ice hockey defenceman. He currently serves as player-head coach and general manager for Brest Albatros Hockey of the FFHG Division 1.

Favarin previously played in the Ligue Magnus for Ours de Villard-de-Lans, Brûleurs de Loups and Gothiques d'Amiens. He also played for the France men's national ice hockey team in the 2004 IIHF World Championship.
