= Peter Bohunický =

Slovak ice hockey forward

- Born: June 24, 1979 (age 46)
- Height: 6 ft 4 in (193 cm)
- Weight: 203 lb (92 kg; 14 st 7 lb)
- Position: Forward
- Shot: Left
- Played for: MHK Dubnica; HK Dukla Trenčín; HC Kladno; HC Karlovy Vary; HC Zlín; Diables Noirs de Tours; Ours de Villard-de-Lans; MHC Martin
- Playing career: 1996–2010

Peter Bohunický (born June 24, 1979) is a Slovak former professional ice hockey forward.

== Career ==
Bohunický played in the Czech Extraliga for HC Kladno, HC Karlovy Vary and HC Zlín, playing 45 regular season over three seasons. He also played in the Tipsport Liga for MHK Dubnica, HK Dukla Trenčín and MHC Martin and the Ligue Magnus for Diables Noirs de Tours and Ours de Villard-de-Lans.

Bohunický also played one season in the Ontario Hockey League with the Sault Ste. Marie Greyhounds who drafted him 24th overall in the 1997 CHL Import Draft.
