= 2011 IIHF Women's World Championship Division II =

Tournament details
- Host country: France
- City: Caen
- Venue: 1 (in 1 host city)
- Dates: 4–10 April 2011
- Teams: 6

The 2011 IIHF Women's World Championship Division II was an international ice hockey tournament organized by the International Ice Hockey Federation. It was played in Caen, France, from 4 to 10 April 2011. Division II represented the third tier of the IIHF Women's World Championship.

The winner of this tournament was promoted to Division I (renamed I A) for the 2012 championships, while the last-placed team in the group was relegated to Division III (renamed II A).

Prior to the start of the tournament, the North Korean team announced they would withdraw, citing financial reasons. All games against them are to be counted as a forfeit, with a score of 5–0 for the opposing team.

== Participating teams ==
| Team | Qualification |
|---|---|
| Czech Republic | placed 5th in 2009 Division I and were relegated |
| France | hosts; placed 6th in 2009 Division I and were relegated |
| ~~North Korea~~ | placed 2nd in 2009 Division II; withdrew from 2011 tournament |
| Great Britain | placed 3rd in 2009 Division II |
| Italy | placed 4th in 2009 Division II |
| Denmark | placed 5th in 2009 Division II |

== Final standings ==
| Pos | Team | Pld | W | OTW | OTL | L | GF | GA | GD | Pts | Promotion, qualification or relegation |
|---|---|---|---|---|---|---|---|---|---|---|---|
| 1 | Czech Republic | 5 | 5 | 0 | 0 | 0 | 23 | 2 | +21 | 15 | Promoted to the 2012 Division I A |
| 2 | France (H) | 5 | 4 | 0 | 0 | 1 | 13 | 5 | +8 | 12 | Qualified for the 2012 Division I B |
| 3 | Denmark | 5 | 3 | 0 | 0 | 2 | 17 | 12 | +5 | 9 | Qualified for the 2012 Division I B |
| 4 | Italy | 5 | 2 | 0 | 0 | 3 | 11 | 9 | +2 | 6 | Qualified for the 2012 Division I B |
| 5 | Great Britain | 5 | 1 | 0 | 0 | 4 | 10 | 21 | −11 | 3 | Qualified for the 2012 Division I B |
| 6 | ~~North Korea~~ | 5 | 0 | 0 | 0 | 5 | 0 | 25 | −25 | 0 | Withdrawn; relegated to the 2012 Division II A |

Source: IIHF
(H) Host

== Match results ==
All times are local (Central European Summer Time – UTC+2).

| 4 April 2011; 13:30 | Denmark | 8–1 (3–1, 3–0, 2–0) | Great Britain | Patinoire de Caen la mer |

Game reference

| 4 April 2011; 17:00 | North Korea | 0–5 (Forfeit) | Czech Republic | Patinoire de Caen la mer |

| 4 April 2011; 20:30 | France | 1–0 (0–0, 1–0, 0–0) | Italy | Patinoire de Caen la mer |

Game reference

| 5 April 2011; 13:30 | Czech Republic | 5–1 (1–0, 3–1, 1–0) | Great Britain | Patinoire de Caen la mer |

Game reference

| 5 April 2011; 17:00 | France | 5–0 (Forfeit) | North Korea | Patinoire de Caen la mer |

| 5 April 2011; 20:30 | Italy | 1–3 (0–0, 1–1, 0–2) | Denmark | Patinoire de Caen la mer |

Game reference

| 7 April 2011; 13:30 | Italy | 1–3 (1–1, 0–0, 0–2) | Czech Republic | Patinoire de Caen la mer |

Game reference

| 7 April 2011; 17:00 | North Korea | 0–5 (Forfeit) | Great Britain | Patinoire de Caen la mer |

| 7 April 2011; 20:30 | France | 3–1 (1–0, 2–0, 0–1) | Denmark | Patinoire de Caen la mer |

Game reference

| 9 April 2011; 13:30 | Italy | 5–0 (Forfeit) | North Korea | Patinoire de Caen la mer |

| 9 April 2011; 17:00 | Denmark | 0–7 (0–3, 0–3, 0–1) | Czech Republic | Patinoire de Caen la mer |

Game reference

| 9 April 2011; 20:30 | Great Britain | 1–4 (0–0, 0–1, 1–3) | France | Patinoire de Caen la mer |

Game reference

| 10 April 2011; 13:30 | North Korea | 0–5 (Forfeit) | Denmark | Patinoire de Caen la mer |

| 10 April 2011; 17:00 | Great Britain | 2–4 (1–1, 1–0, 0–3) | Italy | Patinoire de Caen la mer |

Game reference

| 10 April 2011; 20:30 | Czech Republic | 3–0 (1–0, 0–0, 2–0) | France | Patinoire de Caen la mer |

Game reference

== Statistics ==
=== Scoring leaders ===
| Pos | Player | Country | GP | G | A | Pts | +/− | PIM |
|---|---|---|---|---|---|---|---|---|
| 1 | Nikola Tomigová | Czech Republic | 4 | 6 | 2 | 8 | +10 | 2 |
| 2 | Josefine Jakobsen | Denmark | 4 | 6 | 1 | 7 | +5 | 2 |
| 3 | Alena Polenská | Czech Republic | 4 | 1 | 6 | 7 | +8 | 0 |
| 4 | Lucie Povová | Czech Republic | 4 | 2 | 3 | 5 | +9 | 8 |
| 5 | Simona Študentová | Czech Republic | 4 | 3 | 1 | 4 | 0 | 2 |
| 6 | Betty Jouanny | France | 4 | 2 | 2 | 4 | –1 | 0 |
| 7 | Marie Henriksen | Denmark | 4 | 1 | 3 | 4 | +5 | 0 |
| 8 | Lore Baudrit | France | 4 | 3 | 0 | 3 | +0 | 0 |
| 9 | Barbora Pekárková | Czech Republic | 4 | 2 | 1 | 3 | +2 | 4 |
| 10 | Nicole Jensen | Denmark | 4 | 1 | 2 | 3 | +4 | 2 |
| 10 | Denisa Křížová | Czech Republic | 4 | 1 | 2 | 3 | +3 | 0 |

GP = Games played; G = Goals; A = Assists; Pts = Points; +/− = Plus-minus; PIM = Penalties In Minutes

Source: IIHF.com

=== Goaltending leaders ===
(minimum 40% team's total ice time)

| Pos | Player | Country | TOI | GA | GAA | Sv% | SO |
|---|---|---|---|---|---|---|---|
| 1 | Radka Lhotská | Czech Republic | 239:59 | 2 | 0.50 | 96.49 | 2 |
| 2 | Caroline Baldin | France | 232:29 | 4 | 1.03 | 96.19 | 1 |
| 3 | Giulia Mazzocchi | Italy | 236:58 | 8 | 2.03 | 92.66 | 0 |
| 4 | Nanna Glaas | Denmark | 187:06 | 9 | 2.89 | 92.17 | 0 |
| 5 | Nicole Jackson | Great Britain | 228:10 | 21 | 5.52 | 86.79 | 0 |

TOI = Time On Ice (minutes:seconds); GA = Goals against; GAA = Goals against average; Sv% = Save percentage; SO = Shutouts

Source: IIHF.com

=== Directorate Awards ===
- Goaltender: Caroline Baldin, France
- Defenseman: Kateřina Flachsová, Czech Republic
- Forward: Josefine Jakobsen, Denmark

Source: IIHF.com
