= Josefine Jakobsen =

Danish ice hockey player (born 1991)

- Born: 17 May 1991 (age 34) Aalborg, North Jutland, Denmark
- Height: 170 cm (5 ft 7 in)
- Position: Centre
- Shoots: Left
- SDHL team Former teams: Brynäs IF: Djurgårdens IF; UND Fighting Hawks; Segeltorps IF
- National team: Denmark
- Playing career: 2004–present

Josefine Jakobsen (born 17 May 1991) is a Danish ice hockey centre and member of the Danish national team, currently playing in the Swedish Women's Hockey League (SDHL) with Brynäs IF. Known for her strong two-way play, she is the thirteenth leading scorer in SDHL history and the second leading scorer in Djurgården history. She has won the Swedish Championship three times and was the first player to be named Danish Women's Player of the Year twice by the Danish Ice Hockey Union.

== Playing career ==
In 2008, at the age of 17, Jakobsen left home to sign with Segeltorps IF in Sweden. She would score 27 points in 20 games in her rookie SDHL season, fifth highest among all scorers in the league, as the team lost in the SDHL (then Riksserien) playoff finals. She would go on to win the Swedish Championship with the club in both of the following two seasons, leading the league in goals and points in 2011. She was not only the first Dane to lead the Swedish league in scoring, but her 33 goals that year set an SDHL record for most goals in a single season that would hold until 2016.

She moved to North America ahead of the 2011–12 season to study and play ice hockey at the University of North Dakota, a member institution of the Western Collegiate Hockey Association. Across the next four seasons of NCAA Division I play with the North Dakota Fighting Hawks, she scored 137 points in 147 games, serving as the team's alternate captain in her senior season. Peter Elander, the Fighting Hawks' head coach during Jakobsen's time with the team, has described her as “one of Europe’s absolute best two-way centres.”

After graduating, she returned to Sweden to sign with Djurgårdens IF. In 2017, she would win her third SDHL championship, finishing first among all players for playoff points, as the team beat HV71 in the finals.

=== International ===
Jakobsen has played for the Danish senior national team since 2008. She was named Best Forward of the tournament at the 2011 Women's World Ice Hockey Championships – Division II, and would help the team earn promotion to Division IB in 2012 and to Division IA in 2013.

== Personal life ==
Jakobsen experienced significant hearing loss when she was four years old, which she identifies as a result of complications related to the whooping cough vaccine, and she uses hearing aids. Her four-years older brother, Julian Jakobsen, plays professional ice hockey with the Aalborg Pirates of the Metal Ligaen and with the Danish men's national team.
