= Hockey Club Dijon =

- Nickname: Ducs (Dukes)
- City: Dijon, France
- League: FFHG Division 2
- Founded: 2018
- Home arena: Patinoire Trimolet (capacity: 1,200)
- Colours: Red, black, white

Hockey Club Dijon (Les Ducs HC Dijon) is a French ice hockey team based in Dijon that currently plays in FFHG Division 2. The team was founded in 2018 after the dissolution of Ducs de Dijon, the city's previous professional team.
