= 2023 CBR Brave season =

Australian ice hockey team season

2023 CBR Brave
- Rurak Conference champions
- League: 1st AIHL
- Conference: 1st Rurak
- 2023 record: 20–1–1–4
- Home record: 10–1–0–2
- Road record: 10–0–1–2
- Goals for: 170
- Goals against: 77

Team information
- Coach: (Australia) Stuart Philps
- Assistant coach: (Australia) Jeff Helbren
- Captain: (Australia) Kai Miettinen
- Alternate captains: (Australia) Bayley Kubara (Australia) Casey Kubara
- Arena: Phillip Ice Skating Centre

Team leaders
- Goals: (United States) Austin Albrecht (39)
- Assists: (Canada) Felix Plouffe (44)
- Points: (United States) Austin Albrecht (76)
- Penalty minutes: (Australia) Mike Giorgi (45)
- Goals against average: (Australia) Aleksi Toivonen (2.86)

The 2023 CBR Brave season was the Brave's 8th season in the Australian Ice Hockey League since being founded and entering the league in 2014. Canberra won a fourth consecutive premiership title and lifted the H Newman Reid Trophy, by finishing top of the regular season standings. The Brave also finished top of the newly formed Rurak Conference and held aloft the inaugural Rurak Conference Cup. Canberra finished second in the AIHL Finals, being beaten by the Melbourne Mustangs in the championship grand final in Melbourne to miss out on the Goodall Cup.

== Season notes ==
Pre-season, the Brave organised exhibition games against the Brisbane Lightning in Brisbane and Canberra. Former Sydney Sirens head coach, Jeff Helbren, was signed to take on the role of assistant coach. Caribou Kingston became the first ever Brave naming rights sponsor, with the team to be known as the Caribou CBR Brave for 2023 and Peter Di Salvo was added to the coaching roster as a goaltender coach for Toivonen and Tétreault. During the season the Brave revealed special one-off jerseys for Caribou Kingston, Menslink and Hockey Fights Cancer. All special jerseys were auctioned with proceeds going towards the team, Menslink and Cure Brain Cancer Foundation. Off the ice, CBR Brave super-fan, Emma Easton, died in 2023. Before her death, the Brave faithful celebrated Emma's 35th birthday with a rendition of ‘happy birthday’ at a home game at the Brave Cave. Brave players and supporters then came together to produce a memorial video and give Emma a hockey guard of honour at her funeral.

== Roster ==
Team roster for the 2023 AIHL season.

CBR Brave roster - 2023 AIHL season
Active roster		Coaching staff
Goaltenders: -- (Australia) Andrew Glass; 29 (Australia) Alexandre Tétreault; 35 (Australia) Aleksi Toivonen; Defencemen: 71 (Australia) Jordan Brunt; 44 (Australia) Nick Christensen; 4 (Australia) Lachlan Fahmy; 22 (Australia) Mike Giorgi; 7 (Australia) Bayley Kubara (A); 61 (Australia) Joseph Maatouk; 8 (Canada) Cameron Marks (I); 28 (United States) Carson Vance (I)	Forwards: 11 (United States) Austin Albrecht (I); 27 (Australia) Andreas Camenzind; 42 (Australia) Jackson Gallagher; 81 (Canada) Matthew Harvey; 3 (Australia) Mitchell Henning; 21 (Australia) Joseph Hughes; 15 (Australia) Casey Kubara (A); 85 (Australia) Toby Kubara; 16 (Australia) Tyler Kubara; 64 (Australia) Kai Miettinen (C); 96 (Australia) Ricki Miettinen; 93 (Canada) Félix Plouffe (I); 92 (Australia) Jake Riley; 90 (Canada) Christopher Stoikos (I) (REL); 14 (Australia) Charlie York; 91 (Australia) Henry York	Head Coach: (Australia) Stuart Philps; Coaches: (Australia) Jeff Helbren; (Australia) Peter Di Salvo; (Australia) Andrew Deans; (Australia) Darryl Day; (Australia) Rob Reid; (Australia) Jono Carey; Legend (C) Captain (A) Alternate Captain (I) Import player Statistics; Average age: 27.0; Average height: 184.9 cm Average weight: 84.18 kg Locals: 21; Imports: 5 Acquired 2023: 9 Acquired pre-2023: 17
Last updated on: 7 August 2023
Elite Prospects IHNA

== Transfers ==
All transfers in and out of the team since the last AIHL season. Kale Costa was announced as a signing in pre-season, but in May 2023 it was revealed he would not be joining the team, instead choosing to stay in the Czech Republic to play for HC Stadion Litoměřice in the Czech 1.liga. In July 2024, the Brave signed goaltender Curtis Villani to an affiliate contract. Villani was added to the roster as an emergency backup but was never dressed or used and was subsequently removed from the roster without playing a game.

=== In ===
Pos	Player	Transferred From	Local / Import
W	(United States) Austin Albrecht	Maine Mariners	Import
D	(Australia) Lachlan Fahmy	The Coast	Local
G	(Australia) Andrew Glass	Adelaide Tigers	Local
D/F	(New Zealand) Matthew Harvey	No team	Local
D	(Canada) Cameron Marks	Corsaires de Nantes	Import
F	(Australia) Ricki Miettinen	Jokerit (ACT)	Local
C	(Canada) Felix Plouffe	Corsaires de Nantes	Import
F	(Australia) Jake Riley*	Melbourne Ice	Local
F	(Canada) Christopher Stoikos	Waterloo Maroons	Import
D	(United States) Carson Vance	South Carolina Stingrays	Import

* Mid-season transfer

=== Out ===
Pos	Player	Transferred To	Local / Import
D	(Australia) Declan Bronte	Salem State Vikings	Local
D	(United States) Garret Cockerill	Jacksonville Icemen	Import
F	(Australia) Wehebe Darge	Newcastle Northstars	Local
F	(Australia) Nicholas Doornbos	Steele County Blades	Local
G	(Australia) Luke Fiveash	No team	Local
G	(Australia) Wylie Hodder	No team	Local
D	(Australia) Lynden Lodge	Perth Thunder	Local
D	(United States) Matthew Marasco	No team	Local
F	(Italy) Brandon McNally	Sheffield Steelers	Import
F	(Australia) Hamish Murray	No team	Local
D	(Australia) Matthew Price	Newcastle Northstars	Local
D	(Australia) Alastair Punler	Perth Thunder	Local
F	(Canada) Christopher Stoikos*	Saint-Roch-de-l'Achigan Jaguars	Import
F	(Canada) Mario Valery-Trabucco	No team	Import
D	(Australia) Jamie Woodman	Perth Thunder	Local

* Mid-season transfer

== Staff ==
Current as of 2023 AIHL season.

CBR Brave Staff
Role	Staff
Head Coach	(Australia) Stuart Philps
Assistant Coach	(Australia) Jeff Helbren
Team Manager	(Australia) Andrew Deans
Equipment Manager	(Australia) Darryl Day
Team Doctor	(Australia) Rob Reid
Physiotherapist	(Australia) Jono Carey
General Manager (hockey operations)	(Australia) Jordan Gavin
Chief Operating Officer	(Australia) Steve Moeller
Chief Executive Officer	(Australia) Stephen Campbell
Bench Official	(Australia) Darren Sault
Bench Official	(Australia) Kelly Sault

== Standings ==
=== Regular season ===
Summary

Season	Overall										Home								Away							
Season	P	W	L	OW	OL	GF	GA	GD	Pts	Finish	P	W	L	OW	OL	GF	GA	GD	P	W	L	OW	OL	GF	GA	GD
2023	26	20	4	1	1	170	77	+93	63	1st	13	10	2	1	0	88	37	+51	13	10	2	0	1	82	33	+49

Position by round

Round	1	2	3	4	5	6	7	8	9	10	11	12	13	14	15	16	17	18	19
Position	5	5	5	5	4	3	4	3	2	1	1	1	1	1	1	1	1	1	1

Updated to match(es) played on Completed. Source: www.icehockeynewsaustralia.com

League table

Pos	Team	Pld	W	OTW	OTL	L	GF	GA	GD	Pts	Qualification or relegation
1	CBR Brave (P)	26	20	1	1	4	170	77	+93	63	2023 Goodall Cup Finals
2	Sydney Bears	26	21	0	0	5	132	81	+51	60	2023 Goodall Cup Finals
3	Newcastle Northstars	26	18	1	0	7	162	112	+50	56	2023 Goodall Cup Finals
4	Melbourne Mustangs	26	17	2	0	7	147	94	+53	55	2023 Goodall Cup Finals
5	Perth Thunder	26	17	0	1	8	141	90	+51	52	2023 Goodall Cup Finals
6	Melbourne Ice	26	10	0	0	16	144	165	−21	30	
7	Brisbane Lightning	26	9	1	1	15	156	136	+20	30	2023 Goodall Cup Finals
8	Sydney Ice Dogs	26	7	0	2	17	104	159	−55	23	
9	Adelaide Adrenaline	26	4	0	1	21	90	162	−72	13	
10	Central Coast Rhinos	26	1	1	0	24	75	245	−170	5	

Source: AIHL Elite Prospects
Rules for classification:
Tie-break: 1) points; 2) points percentage; 3) head to head; 4) goal difference; 5) goals scored; 6) coin toss
Points: 3 points for regulation win; 2 points for OT or SO win; 1 point for OT or SO loss; 0 points for regulation loss
Note: Sydney Bears deducted 3 points by the league for accidentally breaching player cap regulations in June 2023.
(P) Premiers

Rurak Conference

Pos	Team	Pld	W	OTW	OTL	L	GF	GA	GD	Pts	Qualification or relegation
1	CBR Brave	26	20	1	1	4	170	77	+93	63	2023 Goodall Cup Finals
2	Newcastle Northstars	26	18	1	0	7	162	112	+50	56	2023 Goodall Cup Finals
3	Brisbane Lightning	26	9	1	1	15	156	136	+20	30	2023 Goodall Cup Finals
4	Adelaide Adrenaline	26	4	0	1	21	90	162	−72	13	
5	Central Coast Rhinos	26	1	1	0	24	75	245	−170	5	

Updated to match(es) played on 6 August 2023. Source: AIHL Elite Prospects
Rules for classification:
Tie-break: 1) points; 2) points percentage; 3) head to head; 4) goal difference; 5) goals scored; 6) coin toss
Points: 3 points for regulation win; 2 points for OT or SO win; 1 point for OT or SO loss; 0 points for regulation loss

=== Finals ===
Summary

Season	Finals weekend								
Season	P	W	L	GF	GA	Result	Play-in final	Semi-final	Goodall Cup final
2022	2	1	1	4	2	Silver	–	Won 4-1 (Thunder)	Lost 0-1 (Mustangs)

Bracket

Play-ins
20 August – Melbourne
Melbourne Mustangs	8
Brisbane Lightning	3
19 August – Newcastle
Newcastle Northstars	1
Perth Thunder	4

Semi-finals
26 August – Melbourne
Sydney Bears	0
Melbourne Mustangs	4
26 August – Melbourne
CBR Brave	4
Perth Thunder	1

Grand final
27 August – Melbourne
Melbourne Mustangs	1
CBR Brave	0

== Schedule & results ==
=== Exhibition games ===
2023 exhibition fixtures and results
Date	Time	Away	Score	Home	Location	Recap
4 MAR	17:00	CBR Brave	5–2	Brisbane Lightning	Iceworld Boondall	Ref
5 MAR	15:30	CBR Brave	6–0	Brisbane Lightning	Iceworld Boondall	Ref
1 APR	17:00	Brisbane Lightning	5–6	CBR Brave	Phillip Ice Skating Centre	Ref

=== Regular season ===
Matchday	1	2	3	4	5	6	7	8	9	10	11	12	13	14	15	16	17	18	19	20	21	22	23	24	25	26
Arena	A	H	A	A	A	H	A	A	H	H	H	H	H	H	A	A	A	H	H	H	H	A	A	A	H	A
Result	W	W	L	W	L	W	W	W	L	W	W	W	W	W	W	W	W	W	W	L	W	W	W	W	W	L

Updated to match(es) played on Completed. Source: AIHL
A = Away; H = Home; W = Win; L = Loss

2023 fixtures and results
Date	Time	Away	Score	Home	Location	Recap
16 APR	15:30	CBR Brave	5–3	Central Coast Rhinos	Erina Ice Arena	
22 APR	17:15	Sydney Ice Dogs	2–3 (OT)	CBR Brave	Phillip Ice Skating Centre	
23 APR	17:00	CBR Brave	2–8	Sydney Bears	Macquarie Ice Rink	
29 APR	17:00	CBR Brave	7–1	Melbourne Ice	O’Brien Icehouse	
30 APR	14:00	CBR Brave	2–3 (SO)	Melbourne Mustangs	O’Brien Icehouse	
06 MAY	17:15	Newcastle Northstars	3–4	CBR Brave	Phillip Ice Skating Centre	
13 MAY	15:30	CBR Brave	9–1	Central Coast Rhinos	Erina Ice Arena	
20 MAY	17:00	CBR Brave	4–1	Sydney Ice Dogs	Macquarie Ice Rink	
27 MAY	17:15	Sydney Bears	3–2	CBR Brave	Phillip Ice Skating Centre	
03 JUN	17:15	Brisbane Lightning	5–9	CBR Brave	Phillip Ice Skating Centre	
04 JUN	16:45	Brisbane Lightning	2–7	CBR Brave	Phillip Ice Skating Centre	
11 JUN	16:45	Melbourne Mustangs	2–8	CBR Brave	Hunter Ice Skating Stadium	
17 JUN	17:15	Newcastle Northstars	4–5	CBR Brave	Phillip Ice Skating Centre	
18 JUN	16:45	Melbourne Ice	7–9	CBR Brave	Phillip Ice Skating Centre	
24 JUN	16:30	CBR Brave	7–4	Perth Thunder	Perth Ice Arena	
01 JUL	17:00	CBR Brave	7–3	Brisbane Lightning	IceWorld Boondall	
02 JUL	16:30	CBR Brave	9–2	Brisbane Lightning	IceWorld Boondall	
08 JUL	17:15	Adelaide Adrenaline	3–8	CBR Brave	Phillip Ice Skating Centre	
09 JUL	16:45	Adelaide Adrenaline	1–8	CBR Brave	Phillip Ice Skating Centre	
15 JUL	17:15	Perth Thunder	4–3	CBR Brave	Phillip Ice Skating Centre	
23 JUL	16:45	Central Coast Rhinos	0–10	CBR Brave	Phillip Ice Skating Centre	
29 JUL	17:00	CBR Brave	6–2	Newcastle Northstars	Hunter Ice Skating Stadium	
05 AUG	16:30	CBR Brave	13–3	Adelaide Adrenaline	IceArenA	
06 AUG	12:30	CBR Brave	6–2	Adelaide Adrenaline	IceArenA	
12 AUG	17:15	Central Coast Rhinos	1–12	CBR Brave	Phillip Ice Skating Centre	
13 AUG	16:00	CBR Brave	5–7	Newcastle Northstars	Hunter Ice Skating Stadium	

=== Finals ===
Goodall Cup semi-final

26 August 2023; 18:30	CBR Brave	4–1 (2–1, 0–0, 2–0)	Perth Thunder	O’Brien Icehouse

Game reference

(Australia) Aleksi Toivonen
Goalies
(Canada) Kristian Stead
Referees:
Rob Love
Mark Peruzzo
Linesmen:
Russell Dow
Hayden Rogers

(Plouffe) Albrecht	1 – 0
(Camenzind) T Kubara	2 – 0
	2 – 1	Breault (Jean)
(Hughes, Harvey) B Kubara	3 – 1
(Albrecht, Vance) Plouffe	4 – 1

6 min
Penalties
4 min
50
Shots
39

Goodall Cup final

27 August 2023; 14:00	Melbourne Mustangs	1–0 (0–0, 1–0, 0–0)	CBR Brave	O’Brien Icehouse

Game reference
(Canada) Liam Hughes	Goalies	(Australia) Aleksi Toivonen	Referees: Kent Unwin; David Gal; Linesmen: Russell Dow; Hayden Rogers
(Lawrence, Timmins) McDowell / 1 – 0			Referees: Kent Unwin; David Gal; Linesmen: Russell Dow; Hayden Rogers
2 min	Penalties	2 min	Referees: Kent Unwin; David Gal; Linesmen: Russell Dow; Hayden Rogers
22	Shots	33	Referees: Kent Unwin; David Gal; Linesmen: Russell Dow; Hayden Rogers

== Awards ==
No team awards announced by the Brave for 2023. No Canberra players or staff were awarded any AIHL season awards for the first time in team history.
