= Radek Míka =

Czech ice hockey defenceman

- Born: March 18, 1984 (age 41); Prague, Czechoslovakia
- Height: 6 ft 1 in (185 cm)
- Weight: 181 lb (82 kg; 12 st 13 lb)
- Position: Defence
- Shot: Right
- Played for: HC Sparta Praha; HC Mladá Boleslav; HC Klatovy; SK Horácká Slavia Třebíč; HC Berounští Medvědi; HC Dukla Jihlava; HC Zlín; HC Stadion Litoměřice; Bisons de Neuilly-sur-Marne; Corsaires de Dunkerque
- Playing career: 2003–2023

Radek Míka (born March 18, 1984) is a Czech professional ice hockey defenceman playing for Bisons de Neuilly-sur-Marne of the FFHG Division 1 in France. He previously played with HC Sparta Praha and HC Zlín in the Czech Extraliga.

== Career statistics ==
			Regular season					Playoffs
Season	Team	League	GP	G	A	Pts	PIM	GP	G	A	Pts	PIM
1999–00	HC Kobra Praha U18	Czech U18 2	24	0	6	6	35	13	1	4	5	10
2000–01	HC Kobra Praha U18	Czech U18 2	2	0	0	0	0	—	—	—	—	—
2000–01	HC Sparta Praha U18	Czech U18	45	3	10	13	22	—	—	—	—	—
2001–02	HC Sparta Praha U20	Czech U20	25	2	1	3	22	4	0	0	0	2
2001–02	HC Kobra Praha U20	Czech U20 2	3	1	1	2	4	—	—	—	—	—
2002–03	HC Sparta Praha U20	Czech U20	45	1	12	13	22	3	1	0	1	4
2003–04	HC Sparta Praha U20	Czech U20	37	2	10	12	61	—	—	—	—	—
2003–04	HC Sparta Praha	Czech	9	0	0	0	8	—	—	—	—	—
2003–04	HC Mladá Boleslav	Czech2	10	0	1	1	6	—	—	—	—	—
2003–04	HC Klatovy	Czech3	1	0	0	0	0	5	0	1	1	2
2004–05	HC Sparta Praha U20	Czech U20	22	3	12	15	44	8	1	3	4	16
2004–05	SK Horácká Slavia Třebíč	Czech2	36	5	6	11	26	—	—	—	—	—
2005–06	HC Berounští Medvědi	Czech2	46	0	1	1	46	—	—	—	—	—
2006–07	HC Berounští Medvědi	Czech2	20	1	1	2	30	—	—	—	—	—
2006–07	HC Dukla Jihlava	Czech2	28	0	4	4	46	4	0	1	1	4
2007–08	HC Dukla Jihlava	Czech2	44	6	9	15	115	4	0	1	1	4
2008–09	HC Zlín	Czech	48	2	5	7	54	5	0	0	0	2
2009–10	HC Zlín	Czech	52	1	6	7	50	6	0	0	0	4
2010–11	HC Zlín	Czech	48	0	1	1	42	—	—	—	—	—
2011–12	HC Zlín	Czech	23	0	0	0	18	6	0	0	0	6
2011–12	SK Horácká Slavia Třebíč	Czech2	2	0	1	1	0	—	—	—	—	—
2012–13	HC Stadion Litoměřice	Czech2	12	0	3	3	24	—	—	—	—	—
2013–14	HC Stadion Litoměřice	Czech2	30	2	5	7	32	6	0	2	2	0
2014–15	HC Stadion Litoměřice	Czech2	52	2	17	19	50	3	0	1	1	4
2015–16	Bisons de Neuilly-sur-Marne	France2	26	1	11	12	58	5	1	1	2	2
2016–17	Bisons de Neuilly-sur-Marne	France2	24	0	4	4	40	—	—	—	—	—
2017–18	Bisons de Neuilly-sur-Marne	France2	26	2	15	17	42	10	0	4	4	12
2018–19	Bisons de Neuilly-sur-Marne	France2	17	0	4	4	30	11	0	6	6	4
2019–20	Bisons de Neuilly-sur-Marne	France2	20	0	5	5	22	3	0	0	0	6
2021–22	Corsaires de Dunkerque	France2	26	0	8	8	58	—	—	—	—	—
2022–23	Bisons de Neuilly-sur-Marne	France2	26	0	3	3	20	4	0	1	1	8
Czech totals			180	3	12	15	172	17	0	0	0	12
Czech2 totals			280	16	48	64	375	17	0	5	5	12
France2 totals			165	3	50	53	270	33	1	12	13	32
