= Asnières Castors =

Castors d'Asnières
- Nickname: Castors; Beavers
- City: Asnières-sur-Seine (France)
- Division: FFHG Division 2
- Founded: 1971
- Home arena: Patinoire olympique d'Asnières
- Colours: Blue, red, white
- President: Fabien Chevalier
- Website: https://www.asniereshockeyclub.fr/

Franchise history
- Asnières Hockey Club

The Asnières Castors is a French ice hockey team based in Asnières-sur-Seine playing in the FFHG Division 2.

The team currently use the name of "Castors d'Asnières".

== History ==
The team was founded in 1972 and plays home games at the Patinoire olympique d'Asnières.

HC Asnieres

== Players ==
=== Captains and Assistant Captains ===
Captains and Assistant Captains' list

Captains and Assistant Captains' list
Season	Captains	Assistants
2004–2005	Marc Dussaucy (France)	
2005–2006	Marc Dussaucy (France)	Sylvain Boulot (France) and David Machon (France)
2006–2007	Sylvain Bourcet (France)	Guillaume Baskakoff (France)
2007–2008	Sylvain Bourcet (France)	Guillaume Pfeiffer (France) and Guillaume Baskakoff (France)
2008–2009	Sylvain Bourcet (France)	Guillaume Pfeiffer (France) and David St. Cyr (Canada)
2009–2010	Antoine Amsellem (France)	Jayson Zilkie (Canada) et Guillaume Pfeiffer (France)
2010–2011	Guillaume Pfeiffer (France)	Arthur Cuzin (France) and Dave Bertrand (Canada)
2011–2012	Guillaume Pfeiffer (France)	Émilien Rouyer (France) and Dave Bertrand (Canada)
2012–2013	Guillaume Pfeiffer (France)	Franz Ehrhart (France) and Ray Tremblay (Canada)
2013–2014	next season	next season

=== Players who played for Asnières Hockey Club ===
In alphabetical order (who have a French Wikipedia page)

Team Players
Name	Nationality	AHC period
Antoine Amsellem	Française (France)	2009–11
Christian Deschênes	Canadienne (Canada)	1997–01
Roger Dubé	Franco-Canadienne (France)	2001–02
Kévin Igier	Française (France)	Young team
