= Corsaires de Nantes =

- City: Nantes, France
- League: Division 1; 2013–present
- Founded: 1984; 42 years ago
- Home arena: Patinoire du Petit Port
- Colors: Black, navy blue
- Website: www.corsairesdenantes.fr

Franchise history
- 1984–1999: Nantes Hockey Glace Les Corsaires
- 1999–present: Nantes Atlantique Hockey Glace Les Corsaires

The Corsaires de Nantes (English: Nantes Corsairs) are an ice hockey team based in Nantes, Loire-Atlantique, France.

== History ==
=== Early years and short top-flight stay ===
The club was founded in 1984, following the opening of the Petit Port Leisure Center, a sports complex featuring a brand new ice rink. It succeeded another club, simply called Hockey sur glace nantais, in the market. Its nickname is a reference to the corsairs, privateers sailing on behalf of the French crown from the Middle Ages to the early 19th century, a number of which were based in Nantes.

The Corsaires briefly figured in the French top tier for the 1992–93 and 1993–94 seasons. The National League, as the top level was then called, was so depleted that it was merged into the second-tier Nationale 1 to form a single, 16-team semi-professional league. Furthermore, five eligible teams were unable or unwilling to participate in the new circuit, allowing Nantes to jump straight from the third to the top level. The Corsaires survived the next two seasons on the ice, but in 1994–95, the championship reverted to its previous formula and an 8-team top tier. Nantes was thus reassigned to the second tier. The team was further relegated to the third tier in the spring of 1995, although it quickly gained promotion back to the second tier.

=== Second-tier final and decline ===
In 1996 the Corsaires recruited winger Dany Fortin (sometimes spelled Danny Fortin), a former team captain and league all-star with the Gaillards de Jonquière of the Quebec Major Collegiate Hockey League. He would spend the better part of his professional career, which lasted until 2011, with the organization and become its all-time leading scorer.

1997 saw the arrival of player-coach fr:Dany Gélinas and defenseman Hubert Dogémont, who had previously been teammates in Valenciennes. Gélinas would be with the team for four seasons before hanging up his skates to pursue a coaching career in Switzerland, while Dogémont would settle in Nantes long term, serving as the club's director of minor hockey and president after his playing career ended.

In their first year under Gélinas, the Corsaires reached the Nationale 1 (second tier) final, losing to the Léopards de Caen. Yet the club was saddled by financial problems, resulting in part from a legal dispute with Gélinas' predecessor Vladimir Zubkov. Due to these difficulties, the city of Nantes threatened to pull the plug on the men's team in 2002. The Conseil général de Loire-Atlantique pledged its support and the club obtained a court judgment allowing it to continue its activities. However, during the delay caused by the proceedings, all vacancies had been filled in Division 1 and the Corsaires were forced to accept relegation to Division 2 (third tier) once more, where they would remain for the next decade.

=== Rebuild and Ligue Magnus ambitions ===
In 2013, Nantes was promoted to Division 1 together with their regional rival and victor in the Division 2 finals, Cholet. For the Division 2 playoffs and ensuing offseason, recently elected president Dogémont summoned longtime collaborator Gélinas—then between jobs in Basel and Lausanne—back to the fold to serve as a special coaching consultant.

In 2019, the club signed a farm team agreement with the Ligue Magnus' Boxers de Bordeaux. The Boxers moved their prospects to Tours after one season.

Since the late 2010s, the Corsaires have emerged as one of the leading candidates for promotion to the Ligue Magnus.

== Venues ==
The club's regular venue is the Patinoire du Petit Port, located slightly north of downtown Nantes inside the eponymous Centre de loisirs du Petit Port. On occasion, it uses a second rink located in the southern suburb of Rezé, which is reserved for the training activities of local clubs.

== In popular culture ==
In 2015, the Corsaires introduced an unusual partnership with Hellfest, a major heavy metal music festival held every June in Clisson. The team wears a Hellfest jersey for away games, and hosts a Hellfest-themed game during the regular season. In 2019, the festival staged a song contest to find the club's anthem, with Sepultura vocalist Derrick Green and Biohazard guitarist Billy Graziadei among the jury members.

== Notable personnel ==
- Dany Gélinas, former EHC Basel head coach/general manager and former HC Fribourg-Gottéron director of player development
- Vladimir Zubkov, former USSR international

== Notable alumni ==
- Antoine Roussel (started playing in Deuil-la-Barre but spent the majority of his French minor hockey career in Nantes)
