= Ronan Quemener =

French ice hockey player

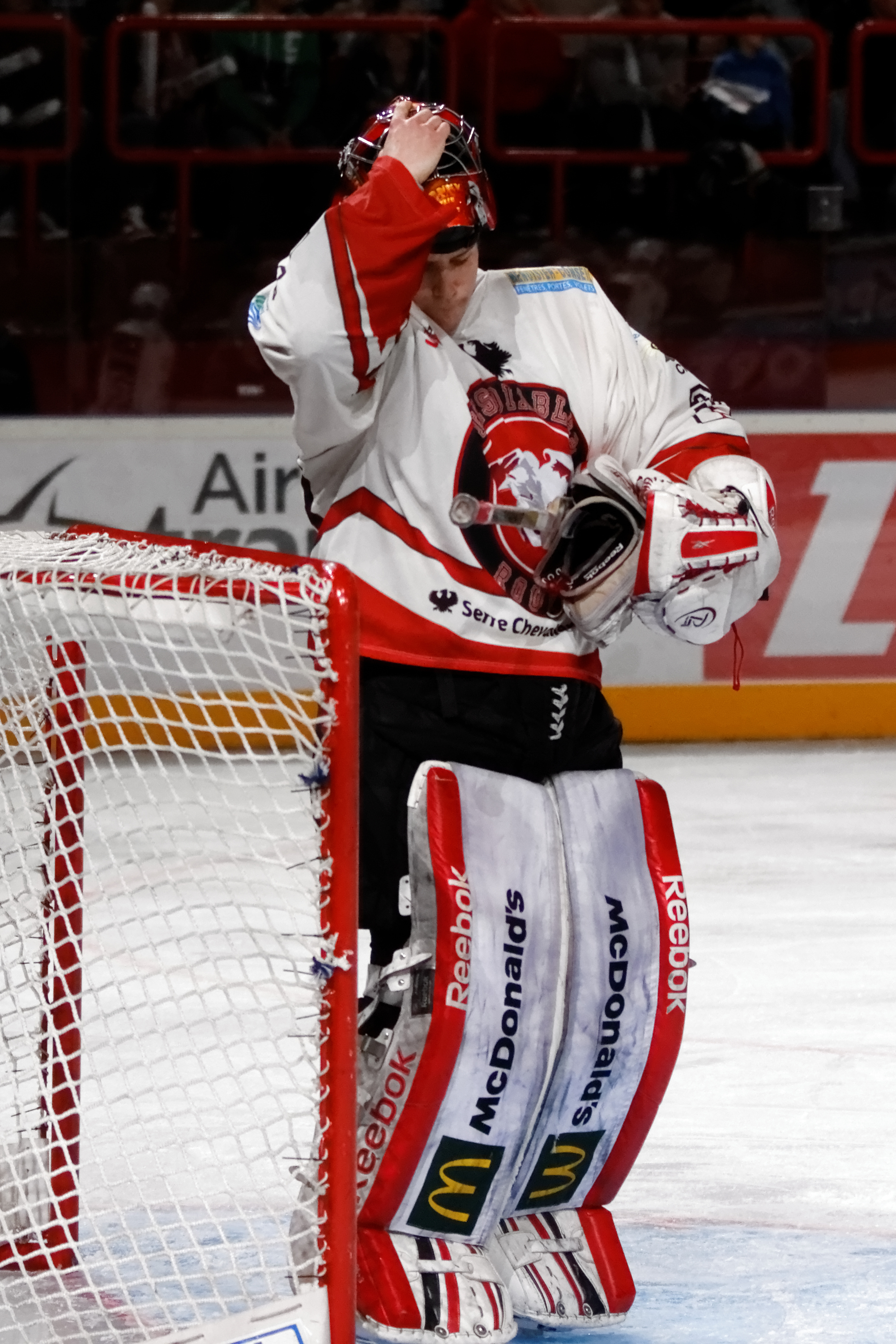
- Born: October 27, 1988 (age 38) Paris, France
- Height: 6 ft 1 in (185 cm)
- Weight: 190 lb (86 kg; 13 st 8 lb)
- Position: Goaltender
- Catches: Left
- Div 1 team Former teams: Drakkars de Caen; Dragons de Rouen; Rapaces de Gap; Brûleurs de Loups; Diables Rouges de Briançon; Aalborg Pirates; Dornbirner EC; Boxers de Bordeaux
- National team: France
- NHL draft: Undrafted
- Playing career: 2009–present

Ronan Quemener (born February 13, 1988) is a French ice hockey goaltender who is currently playing for Drakkars de Caen of the FFHG Division 1.

Quemener previously played in the Ligue Magnus for Dragons de Rouen, Rapaces de Gap, Brûleurs de Loups, Diables Rouges de Briançon and Boxers de Bordeaux.

Quemener has also played for France at the 2011, 2014, 2015, 2016, 2017 and 2018 IIHF World Championship.
