= Vladimir Zubkov =

Soviet ice hockey player

Vladimir Zubkov (born January 14, 1958) is a Russian former professional ice hockey player who played in the Soviet Hockey League for HC Spartak Moscow and HC CSKA Moscow. He was inducted into the Russian and Soviet Hockey Hall of Fame in 1983. Even if he got drafted by the Edmonton Oilers at the 1988 NHL entry draft, Zubkov went on to play in France in Amiens, Chamonix, Cholet and Nantes from 1988 to 2000.
