= FFHG Division 3 =

FFHG Division 3 logo.

FFHG Division 3 (Fédération Française de Hockey sur Glace Division 3 or French Ice Hockey Federation Division 3) is an amateur ice hockey league in France. It is the fourth of four levels of national ice hockey in France.

== Teams ==
FFHG Division 3 consists of 32 teams divided into four pools with eight teams each.

Pool A

- Boxers de Bordeaux II
- Albatros de Brest II
- Dogs de Cholet II
- Taureaux de feu de Limoges II
- Corsaires de Nantes II
- Dragons de Poitiers
- Cormorans de Rennes
- Aigles de La Roche-sur-Yon II

Pool B

- Tigres de l'ACBB
- Drakkars de Caen II
- Coqs de Courbevoie II
- Chiefs de Deuil-Garges
- Corsaires de Dunkerque II
- Renards d'Orléans
- Remparts dre Tours II
- Diables rouges de Valenciennes

Pool C

- Gaulois de Châlons-en-Champagne
- Élans de Champigny
- Titans de Colmar
- Caribous de Seine-et-Marne
- Ducs de Dijon II
- Dauphins d'Épinal II
- Jets d'Évry Viry II
- Tornado Luxembourg

Pool D

- Chevaliers du lac d'Annecy II
- Éléphants de Chambéry II
- Sangliers Arvernes de Clermont II
- Vipers de Montpellier
- Aigles de Nice II
- Boucaniers de Toulon
- Lynx de Valence II
- Bouquetins de Val-Vanoise II

== Season ==
Each team plays the other teams in their pool at home and away. At the end of this regular season the 4 highest-ranking teams in each pool enter a combined knock-out play-off series while the four lowest-ranking teams (two from each pool) enter a play-off series of their own. The winner of the former play-off series is promoted to FFHG Division 2.

== Champions ==
Year	Denomination	Champion
1986-87	Division 3	Brûleurs de Loups de Grenoble II
1987-88	Division 3	Gothiques d'Amiens II
1988-89	Division 3	Galaxians d'Amnéville
1989-90	Division 3	Ours de Villard-de-Lans II
1990-91	Division 3	Wild Horses de Nîmes
1991-92	Division 3	Vikings de Cherbourg
1992-93	Division 3	No competition
1993-94	Division 3	No competition
1994-95	Division 3	Éléphants de Chambéry
1995-96	Division 3	Peaux-Rouges d'Évry
1996-97	Division 3	Castors d'Asnières
1997-98	Division 3	Albatros de Brest
1998-99	Division 3	Vikings de Cherbourg
1999-00	Division 3	Brûleurs de Loups de Grenoble
2000-01	Division 3	Bisons de Neuilly-sur-Marne
2001-02	Division 3	Brûleurs de Loups de Grenoble II
2002-03	Division 3	Vipers de Montpellier
2003-04	Division 3	Aigles de Nice
2004-05	Division 3	Élans de Champigny
2005-06	Division 3	Avalanche Mont-Blanc II
2006-07	Division 3	Aigles des Pyrénées de Font-Romeu
2007-08	Division 3	Dragons de Rouen II
2008-09	Division 3	Orques d'Anglet
2009-10	Division 3	Boucaniers de Toulon
2010-11	Division 3	Lions de Compiègne
2011-12	Division 3	Étoile noire de Strasbourg II
2012-13	Division 3	Renards de Roanne
2013-14	Division 3	Castors d'Avignon
2014-15	Division 3	Lions de Wasquehal
2015-16	Division 3	Vipers de Montpellier
2016-17	Division 3	Gaulois de Châlons-en-Champagne
2017-18	Division 3	Pingouins de Morzine-Avoriaz
2018-19	Division 3	Épinal Hockey Club
2021-22	Division 3	Drakkars de Caen II
2022-23	Division 3	Aigles de La Roche-sur-Yon
2023-24	Division 3	Ducs de Dijon
2024-25	Division 3	Scorpions de Mulhouse
2025-26	Division 3	Lions de Wasquehal
