= Pontus Eklöf =

Swedish ice hockey player

- Born: January 2, 1998 (age 27); Linköping, Sweden
- Height: 5 ft 7 in (170 cm)
- Weight: 130 lb (59 kg; 9 st 4 lb)
- Position: Forward
- Shoots: Right
- Hockeyettan team Former teams: Tranås AIF; Linköpings HC
- Playing career: 2016–present

Pontus Eklöf (born January 2, 1998) is a Swedish ice hockey player. He previously played with Linköpings HC of the Swedish Hockey League (SHL).

== Career ==
Born in Linköping, Sweden, Eklöf played junior hockey with local team Linköpings HC. In 2012–13, he debuted at the under-16 level, playing twelve games in the J16 Elit. The following season he played in ten U-18 games. That same year, he also competed with a regional all-star team from Östergötland in the annual TV-pucken, an under-15 national tournament, and recorded two goals and five assists over eight games. In 2015–16, Eklöf played twenty one games with Linköpings HC's J20 SuperElit team. After impressive performances in the youth ranks, Eklöf made his Swedish Hockey League debut against Brynäs IF.

== Career statistics ==
=== Regular season and playoffs ===
			Regular season					Playoffs
Season	Team	League	GP	G	A	Pts	PIM	GP	G	A	Pts	PIM
2015–16	Linköpings HC	J20	21	2	7	9	8	—	—	—	—	—
2016–17	Linköpings HC	J20	42	13	26	39	16	2	1	0	1	0
2016–17	Linköpings HC	SHL	8	0	0	0	0	—	—	—	—	—
2017–18	Linköpings HC	J20	42	17	29	46	18	3	0	2	2	4
