= Éléphants de Chambéry =

- City: Chambéry, France
- League: FFHG Division 1
- Founded: 1972
- Home arena: Patinoire de Buisson rond
- Colors: yellow, silver, black

Championships
- Playoff championships: FFHG Division 3; 1995; FFHG Division 2; 2018

The Éléphants de Chambéry (Chambéry Elephants) are a French professional ice hockey team in Chambéry, Auvergne-Rhône-Alpes that plays in FFHG Division 1. The team is named in honor of the city's famous landmark, the Fontaine des Éléphants

== History ==
The Chambéry landmark: the Elephants Fountain.

The Éléphants de Chambéry was founded as a low level team in 1972. Much of their early history is unavailable but the team began play in FFHG Division 2 (French 3rd Division) and was at that level in the mid-1980s when they were relegated to FFHG Division 3. The team spent almost a decade in the fourth league before winning the league championship in 1995 and earning a promotion back to Division 2. Chambéry spent much of the next 20 years trying to stave off relegation and saved themselves several times. However, the Elephants tempted fate one too many times and lost the relegation series in 2011. Fortunately, the team was saved by financial difficulties for other clubs and they were allowed to remain in Division 2. The near-disaster seemed to rekindle the club and Chambéry swiftly built itself into contender. In 2018, the team won its second championship and earned a promotion to Division 1, where they remain as of 2024.

== Season-by-season results ==
=== Division 1 ===
Season	GP	W	L	OTW	OTL	Pts	GF	GA	Finish	Playoffs
2018–19	26	3	16	0	6	15	85	149	14th	saved in relegation
2019–20	26	8	12	5	1	34	78	97	10th	missed postseason
2020–21	11	4	6	0	1	14	39	54	4th in group B	missed postseason
2021–22	26	8	11	4	3	35	80	99	11th	saved in relegation
2022–23	26	9	13	2	2	33	78	88	12th	saved in relegation
2023–24	26	11	12	3	0	39	84	89	7th	Lost Finals, 2–3
Totals	141	43	70	14	13	—	444	576	—	—

== Roster ==
=== Current roster ===
As of April 23, 2024.

No.	Nat	Player	Pos	S/G	Age	Acquired	Birthplace	Contract
5	(France)	Valentin Grossetete	RW	L	21	2023 (Loan)	Clermont-Ferrand	Grenoble
6	(Canada)	Samuel Régis (A)	D	L	24	2023 (Loan)	Châteauguay	Grenoble
11	(France)	Joran Reynaud (C)	C/LW	L	28	2022	Montmorency	Chambéry
12	(France)	Thomas Maguin	D	L	22	2024 (Loan)	Pontoise	Grenoble
17	(France)	Titouan Blanchard (A)	C	L	25	2022	Grenoble	Chambéry
19	(Canada)	Brad Belisle	D	L	27	2023	Thunder Bay	Chambéry
20	(France)	Tanguy Franzini	D	L	25	2017	Chambéry	Chambéry
24	(France)	Léo Lesage	F	R	23	2022	Les Abymes	Chambéry
29	(Canada)	Colby Muise	G	L	27	2023	Yarmouth	Chambéry
37	(France)	Maxime Corvez	D	R	23	2023	Grenoble	Chambéry
38	(France)	Dov Reboh (A)	D	L	22	2023	Grenoble	Chambéry
68	(France)	César Perret	D	L	23	2023	Grenoble	Chambéry
76	(Canada)	Mathis Despatie	D	L	22	2023 (Loan)	Sainte-Agathe-des-Monts	Grenoble
77	(France)	Antoine Fertin	D	R	22	2023 (Loan)	La Tronche	Grenoble
81	(France)	Hugo Letellier	F	L	22	2023	Grenoble	Chambéry
82	(Canada)	Zackary Daneau	C	R	25	2021	Trois-Rivières	Chambéry
86	(Finland)	Justus Mikkonen	F	L	28	2023	Jyväskylä	Chambéry
88	(France)	Sacha Reboh	F/D	R	28	2021	Grenoble	Chambéry
91	(United States)	Henry McKinney	F	R	28	2023	Washington, D.C.	Chambéry
92	(France)	Téo Besnier	D	R	20	2023 (Loan)	Briançon	Grenoble
96	(France)	Tom Guidoux	W	R	21	2024 (Loan)	Grenoble	Grenoble
98	(France)	Hugo Nogaretto	F	R	20	2023 (Loan)	Grenoble	Grenoble
