= Centre de loisirs du Petit Port =

Sports complex located in France

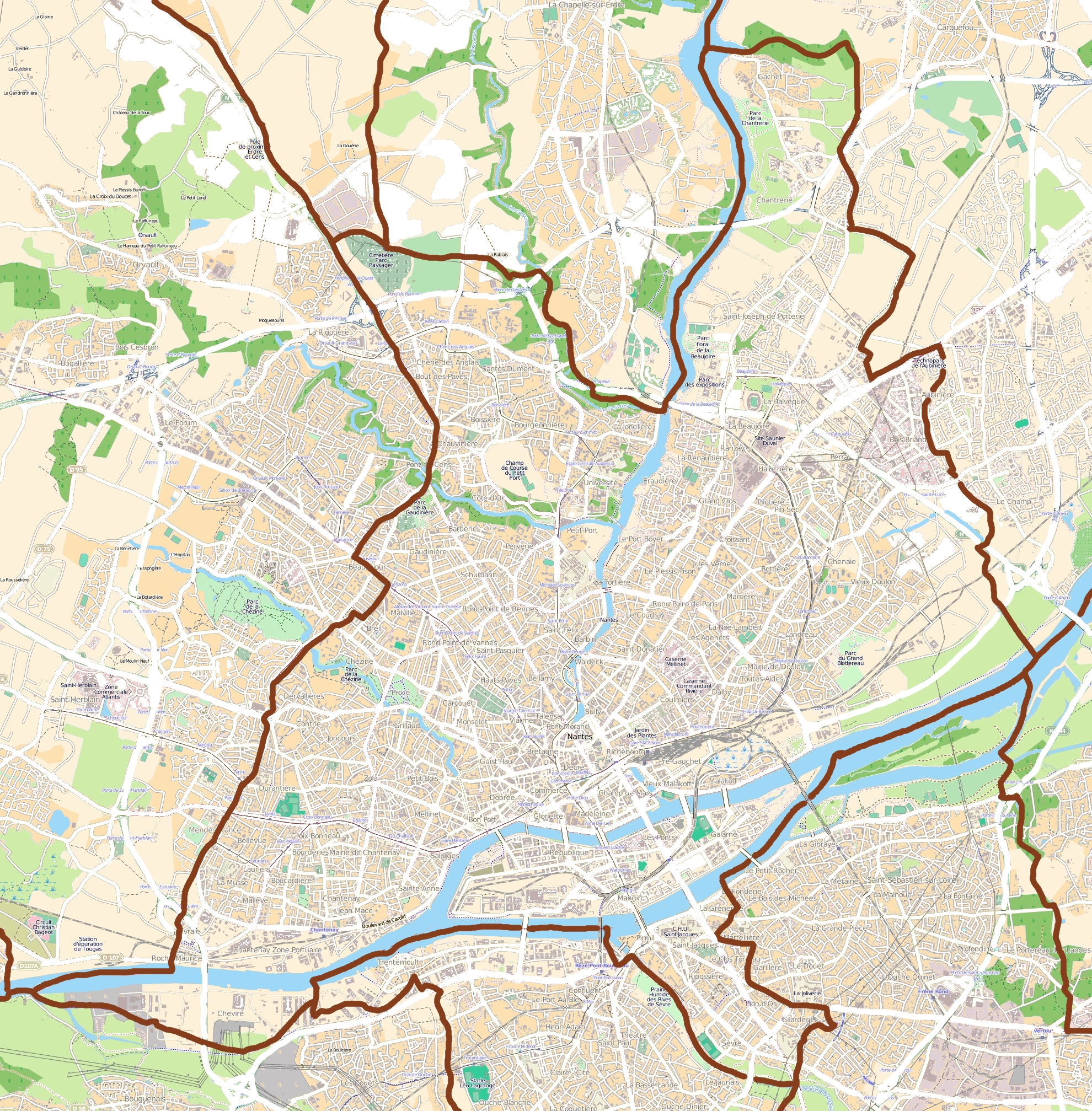
- Location within Nantes Location within Loire-Atlantique Location within France
- Coordinates: 47.24273°N 1.55525°W
- Operator: Nantes-métropole Gestion Équipements
- Main venue: Ice rink
- Facilities: Aquatic center Gymnasiums
- Acreage: 14,700 m^{2} (158,000 sq ft)

Construction
- Opened: 1984
- Renovated: 2017
- Expanded: 2007–08

Centre de loisirs du Petit Port (English: Petit Port Leisure Center; Breton: Kreizenn dudi Porzh bihan), also marketed by the metonym Le Petit Port, is a sports complex in Nantes, Loire-Atlantique, France. It is part of the eponymous Petit Port sports and recreation district. Opened in 1984, the building underwent two major restructurings in 2007–08 and 2017.

== History ==
The complex was built in 1984 and originally consisted of an ice rink, a swimming pool, a billiard hall and a bowling center, in addition to various catering options. Prior to being incorporated into the Petit Port project, the ice rink was planned as a separate facility, next to the city's mediatheque in downtown Nantes.

In the early 2000s, an extension incorporating resort-like features for both the ice rink and swimming pool was considered. However, the swimming pool's technical layout made the extension impractical. Instead the original pool was closed, and a new one was built from scratch to the east, on the complex's last vacant side. Save for standard renovations, the ice rink was left unchanged. The revamp—pegged at €17.2 million—was completed in two phases across 2007 and 2008.

In 2009, the billiards hall and bowling center shut down due to increased competition from suburban operators which, following the closure of the old swimming pool, left the southern part of the complex virtually empty.

The unoccupied premises were zoned for a day care center and a 2500 m^{2} play park consisting of five discovery zones, each dedicated to a different family of sports. However, when several downtown clubs were displaced to the Petit Port by safety issues affecting their historic venue, the play park was cancelled and replaced with a set of gyms matching their activities. The remodel, which also optimized the ice rink's backstage space, was completed in 2017 at a cost of €5.2 million.

From its inception in 1984, the center has used a photovoltaic system, which was expanded during a 2010 renovation of the ice rink's roof, bringing its total surface to 1160 m^{2}.

== Ice rink ==
Patinoire du Petit Port
- Interactive map of Patinoire du Petit Port
- Capacity: 1243
- Executive suites: 1
- Field size: 60 × 30 metre

Tenant
- Corsaires de Nantes (1984–present)

Website
- www.patinoire-nantes.fr

Patinoire du Petit Port (English: Petit Port Ice Rink) is an Olympic-size facility with a single lateral stand seating 1034, and six club locker rooms. It is home to the Corsaires de Nantes ice hockey team, and hosted the 2017 French Ice Skating Championships.

Transformative enhancements to the ice rink section of the building have struggled to get past the decision phase, leaving the visitor experience mostly unchanged throughout the years. Initial plans for the 2007–08 rebuild included an additional, 1000 m^{2} sound-insulated ice surface for dance parties, and the play park projected for 2013 featured a 200 m^{2} children's discovery zone made of synthetic ice, but neither materialized.

Instead, modest improvements have been made to the existing structure. In 2013, the old billiards hall was transformed into the 160 m^{2} Espace Boréal, which can be used as a video room, conditioning room or hospitality space. Some office space shuffling, combined with the scaling down of a bar, allowed for the creation of three new locker rooms in 2017.

Due to its outdated design, the venue has long lacked proper executive suites, and remains dependent on repurposed space for its corporate experience. In 2021, the Corsaires ice hockey team offered to share costs on a new VIP stand with the city, although due to space constraints capacity will only increase to about 1200.

== Swimming pool ==
The current aquatic center opened in 2007 inside a newly constructed east wing, while the original from 1984 was converted for other sports (see Gymnasiums).
The new version replicates the original's core facilities : a six-lane, 25-metre swimming pool, and a freeform teaching pool with a small water slide. Added features include a separate paddling area next to the teaching pool, an ellipse-shaped relaxation area and a second, pitch-black water slide. The total water surface is 900 m^{2}.

A 600 m^{2} spa is located next to the swimming pool and connected to it. Furnished at a cost of €1.5 million, it opened in 2010.

The east wing is connected to the original building via a new, 1900 m^{2} central aisle, which has translucent panels in both floor and ceiling to illuminate a stream running under the leisure center. The 2007 extension is credited to architect Jean-Louis Berthomieu, a swimming pool specialist who went on to design the Cercle des Nageurs de Cannes' Grand Bleu complex.

== Gymnasiums ==
In 2017, a suite of gyms opened in a space formerly occupied by the bowling center and original swimming pool. They consist of a nine-piste fencing hall, a dojo, a boxing and savate gym, a gymnastics hall and a weight room. The combined exercise area is 1600 m^{2}.
