= Patinoire de Caen la mer =

Ice rink in Caen, France

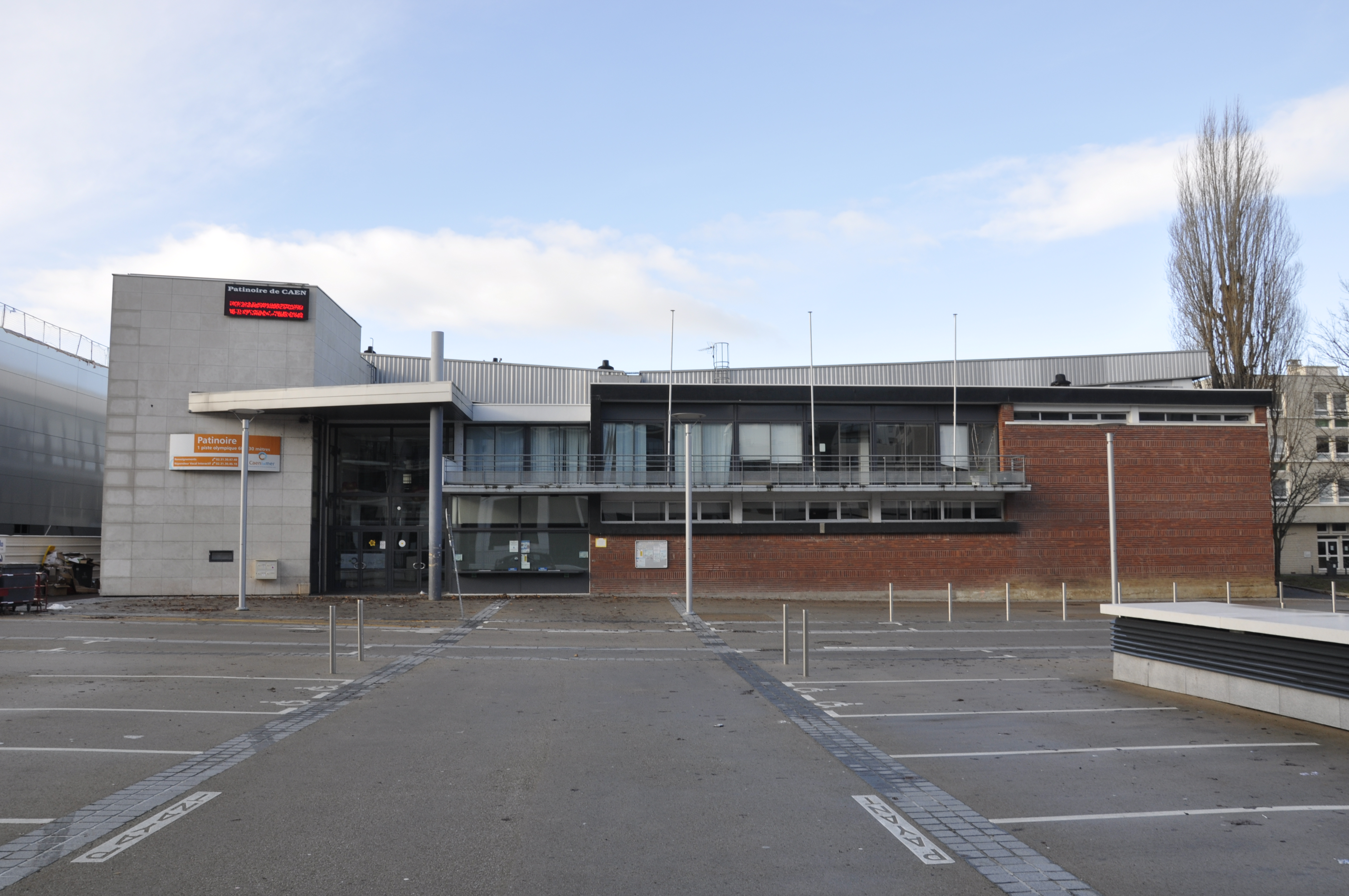
- Interactive map of Patinoire de Caen la mer
- Location: 8 rue Jean de la Varende; 14000 Caen, France
- Coordinates: 49°10′38″N 0°22′06″W
- Capacity: Hockey: 1,499

Construction
- Opened: 27 Dec 1971
- Renovated: 2000

Tenants
- Drakkars de Caen (1971-present); ACSEL (1990-present)

Website
- (in French) http://www.caenlamer.fr/patinoire/index.asp

The Patinoire de Caen la mer (English: Ice rink of Caen la mer) is an ice rink in Caen, France. It is the home arena of the Drakkars de Caen of the Ligue Magnus, and the ACSEL figure skating club. It also offers public access to the ice rink for free skating and lessons.

== History ==
The arena was opened on December 27, 1971. It was renovated in 2000.

=== Competitions ===
- The 1989 French Figure Skating Championships for singles and pairs were held here.
- The 2011 Women's World Ice Hockey Championships – Division II were held here.
- The Italian Men's National Ice Hockey Team beat the French National Team in a friendly warmup match for the 2012 Men's World Ice Hockey Championships here.
