= Diables Rouges de Valenciennes =

- City: Valenciennes, France
- League: FFHG Division 1
- Founded: 1971
- Home arena: Valigloo
- Colors: red, black, white

Championships
- Playoff championships: FFHG Division 2: 1991

The Diables Rouges de Valenciennes (Valenciennes Red Devils) are a French professional ice hockey team in Valenciennes, Hauts-de-France that plays in FFHG Division 1. The team was previously known as the 'Valenciennes Hainaut Hockey Club'.

== History ==
The team's foundation is uncertain as various websites list either 1970 or 1971 as the club's first year, however, FFHG lists 1971 as the inaugural season. The Red Devils began play as in the second division of French ice hockey, then called the Deuxième Série (Second Series). Little information is available for the team at this time but Les Diables Rouges were forced to withdraw from competition during their first season. Two years later, the team found itself in the third division but then vanish from the record for the next four years.

By at least 1978, Valenciennes was active in the third division. They received a promotion back to the second division in 1980 and played well enough the following year to participate in the relegation round. After Valenciennes failed in their bid to reach the top level, the team took a precipitous tumble and found themselves in the fourth division (lowest tier) of French hockey in 1987. The club wallowed at the bottom for a few years but lucked into a promotion in 1990 when the second team from Amiens suspended operations. The timing could not have been better for Valenciennes as they won the league championship the very next season, earning a promotion to the second division. Unfortunately, the team was unable to accept at the time but after earning a second promotion the following year they were able to return to the second division. Their stay lasted all of one year as the Devils went winless and dropped back to the third tier.

In 1996 the team declared bankruptcy and were forced into a demotion despite finishing with one of their best seasons in years. They remained in the fourth league for most of the next 20 years when they were chosen as a replacement for the second Épinal club in 2017. After staving off relegation for a few years, as well as surviving the upheaval of the COVID-19 troubles, Valenciennes rose to the top of the league in the early 2020s. Despite their sterling record in the regular seasons, the Red Devils were twice eliminated in the quarterfinal rounds. Luckily for them, a spot opened up in FFHG Division 1 in 2023 and Valenciennes was able to afford the promotion back to the second tier.

== Season-by-season results ==
Last five seasons.

Season	GP	W	L	OTW	OTL	Pts	GF	GA	Finish	Playoffs
FFHG Division 2
2019–20	18	6	11	1	0	20	68	96	8th in Poule A	postseason cancelled
2020–21	1	0	1	0	0	0	3	6	—	season cancelled
2021–22	18	12	4	1	1	39	75	52	2nd in Poule A	Quarterfinal loss
2022–23	18	15	2	0	1	46	121	52	2nd in Poule A	Quarterfinal loss
FFHG Division 1
2023–24	26	3	21	1	1	12	75	146	14th	saved in relegation

== Roster ==
=== Current roster ===
As of March 25, 2025.

No.	Nat	Player	Pos	S/G	Age	Acquired	Birthplace	Contract
2	(France)	Gaspard Vanwormhoudt	D	L	18	2025 (Loan)	Dunkerque	Amiens
5	(France)	Anatole De Mali	F	L	20	2025 (Loan)	Enghien-les-Bains	Amiens
6	(United States)	Maxwell Roth (A)	D	L	28	2024	Evanston	Valenciennes
7	(France)	Valentin Detouteville	F	L	21	2025 (Loan)	Rouen	Amiens
10	(France)	Jules Renault	F	R	21	2024	Charleville-Mézières	Valenciennes
11	(France)	Mathieu Buttin (A)	D	L	26	2024	Grenoble	Valenciennes
13	(France)	Clément Garrido (A)	RW	L	26	2024	Amiens	Valenciennes
14	(France)	Thomas Malhouitre	D	R	23	2024	Mont-Saint-Aignan	Valenciennes
16	(France)	Victor Breton	F	L	27	2023	Épinal	Valenciennes
21	(France)	Ugo Tocquin	F	L	21	2025 (Loan)	Amiens	Amiens
22	(Canada)	Kevin Altidor (C)	F	L	32	2024	Montreal	Valenciennes
39	(France)	Tonin Caubet	G	L	23	2024	Bayonne	Valenciennes
55	(France)	Raphaël Chateauvieux	G	L	21	2025 (Loan)	Rouen	Amiens
71	(United States)	Reilly Moran	F	R	25	2024	Hingham	Valenciennes
74	(France)	Peter Gincourt	D	L	20	2024	Sallanches	Valenciennes
77	(France)	Lévy Raux	F	L	25	2024	Vernon	Valenciennes
78	(France)	Arille Dupont	F	R	21	2025	Chambray-lès-Tours	Valenciennes
80	(Sweden)	Marcus Karlsson	D	R	24	2024	Uppsala	Valenciennes
90	(Finland)	Risto Saarinen	RW	R	25	2024	Rauma	Valenciennes
91	(Finland)	Patrik Jääskeläinen	F	L	27	2024	Jyväskylä	Valenciennes
92	(Canada)	Levi Glasman	LW	L	26	2025	Minnedosa	Valenciennes
93	(France)	Maxime Bataillé (A)	D	L	25	2024	Nogent-sur-Marne	Valenciennes
96	(France)	Thomas Vandeputte	F/D	R	21	2025	Nice	Valenciennes
