= Hockey Club de Caen =

- Nickname: Drakkars (Longships)
- City: Caen, France
- League: Division 1 (2015-present); Ligue Magnus (1977-78) (2005-2008) (2010-2015)
- Founded: 1968; 58 years ago
- Home arena: Patinoire de Caen la mer (capacity: 1,499)
- Colours: Blue, red and white
- President: Christophe Lanes
- Head coach: Jaroslav Prosvic
- Captain: Alexandre Mulle
- Website: Les Drakkars

Franchise history
- Hockey Club de Caen

Hockey Club de Caen is a French ice hockey team based in Caen, Normandy playing in the Division 1. The team is also known as "Drakkars de Caen" (Caen Longships). The team was formerly called the Léopards de Caen.

The team was founded in 1968 and plays home games at the Patinoire de Caen la mer.

== Prize list ==
=== Major Hockey ===
- Continental Cup:

The best route: 1st tour in 2000–01.

- Ligue Magnus:
  - Vice champion: 2000.
- Division 1: (4)
  - Champion: 1979, 1989, 1998, 2010.
  - Vice champion: 2009.
- Division 2: (1)
  - Champion: 1994.
  - Vice-champion: 1993, 2003.
- Division 3:
  - Vice champion: 2002.
- Coupe de France: (1)
  - Winner: 2000.
- Coupe de la Ligue:

The best route: Quarter-finals in 2008.

=== Minor Hockey ===
- Championnat de France Cadet excellence:
  - Champion: 2003.

== Notable players ==
- Luc Tardif

=== 2025–26 season ===
- Jonathan Janil, defender
- Ronan Quemener, goaltender
