= Remparts de Tours =

- City: Tours
- League: FFHG Division 1
- Founded: 2010
- Home arena: Patinoire municipale de Tours
- Colors: Blue, white and black

Franchise history
- 2010–present: Remparts de Tours

Remparts de Tours is a professional ice hockey based out of Tours, France. The team currently competes in the French second league.

== History ==
After the Diables Noirs de Tours folded in 2010, the city immediately got another professional ice hockey team when the Remparts de Tours were founded that summer. Though they began play in Division 3, the Remparts were promoted up to Division 2 for their second year thanks to their playoff performance. Just three years later, the team reached the league final and were promoted again to Division 1, where they have remained ever since (as of 2025).
