= FFHG Division 2 =

Amateur ice hockey league in France

FFHG Division 2 Fédération Française de Hockey sur Glace Division 2
- Current season, competition or edition: 2024–2025
- Association: French Ice Hockey Federation Division 2
- Classification: Amateur
- Sport: Ice hockey
- No. of teams: 20
- Country: France
- Most titles: Albatros de Brest (3)
- Promotion to: FFHG Division 1
- Relegation to: FFHG Division 3
- Website: Official website

FFHG Division 2 (Fédération Française de Hockey sur Glace Division 2 or French Ice Hockey Federation Division 2) is an amateur ice hockey league in France. It is the third of four levels of national ice hockey in France. The teams that end at the bottom of the table get relegated to FFHG Division 3 while the top get promoted to FFHG Division 1.

== Teams ==
FFHG Division 2 consists of 19 teams. (As of the 2025–26 season)

- Anglet Hormadi II
- Chevaliers du Lac d'Annecy
- Brest Albatros Hockey
- Gaulois de Châlons-en-Champagne
- Sangliers Arvernes de Clermont-Ferrand
- Coqs de Courbevoie
- Jets d'Évry-Viry
- Français Volants de Paris
- Hogly La Roche-sur-Yon
- Vipers de Montpellier
- Scorpions de Mulhouse
- Renards d'Orléans
- Les Phénix de Reims
- Renards de Roanne
- Dragons de Rouen II
- Tornado Luxembourg
- Bélougas de Toulouse-Blagnac
- Lynx de Valence
- Les Grizzlys de Vaujany

== Season ==
Each team plays the other teams in their pool at home and away. At the end of this regular season the 8 highest-ranking teams in each pool enter a combined knock-out play-off series while the four lowest-ranking teams (two from each pool) enter a play-off series of their own. The winner of the former play-off series is promoted to FFHG Division 1 while the loser of the latter play-off series is demoted to FFHG Division 3.

== Champions ==
Year	Champion	Runner-Up
1972-1973	Brûleurs de Loups de Grenoble	
1973-1974	Français Volants (Paris)	
1974-1975	Diables Noirs de Tours	
1975-1976	Diables Noirs de Tours II	
1976-1977	Les Houches	
1977-1978	Brûleurs de Loups de Grenoble	
1978-1979	Épinal	
1979-1980	Hockey Club Val Vanoise	
1980-1981	Nîmes	
1981-1982	Français Volants	
1982-1983	Viry II	
1983-1984	Aigles de Nice	Orléans
1984-1985	Bordeaux	Français Volants Paris II
1985-1986	Épinal	Pingouins de Morzine-Avoriaz
1986-1987	Clermont	Pingouins de Morzine-Avoriaz
1987-1988	Ducs de Dijon	Lyon
1988-1989	Lyon	Deuil-la-barre
1989-1990	Pingouins de Morzine-Avoriaz	Anges du Vésinet
1990-1991	Valenciennes	Anges du Vésinet
1991-1992	Annecy	Pingouins de Morzine-Avoriaz
1992-1993	Bordeaux	Diables Noirs de Tours
1993-1994	Diables Rouges de Briançon	Dogs de Cholet
1994-1995	Diables Rouges de Briançon	Étoile Noire de Strasbourg
1995-1996	Pingouins de Morzine-Avoriaz	Valenciennes
1996-1997	Dogs de Cholet	Anges du Vésinet
1997-1998	Toulouse	Diables Noirs de Tours
1998-1999	Albatros de Brest	Castors d'Asnières
1999-2000	Ducs de Dijon	Morzine
2000-2001	Séquanes de Besançon	Castors d'Asnières
2001-2002	Albatros de Brest	Castors d'Asnières
2002-2003	Castors d'Avignon	Drakkars de Caen
2003-2004	Montpellier	Toulouse
2004-2005	Chevaliers du Lac d'Annecy	Jets de Viry-Essonne
2005-2006	Diables Noirs de Tours	Boxers de Bordeaux
2006-2007	ASM Belfort Hockey	Albatros de Brest
2007-2008	Aigles de Nice	LHC Les Lions
2008-2009	Albatros de Brest	Scorpions de Mulhouse
2009-2010	Orques d'Anglet	Bélougas de Toulouse
2010-2011	Corsaires de Dunkerque	LHC Les Lions
2011-2012	Chevaliers du Lac d'Annecy	Galaxians d'Amnéville
2012-2013	Dogs de Cholet	Corsaires de Nantes
2013-2014	Bélougas de Toulouse	Remparts de Tours
2014-2015	Bouquetins de Val-Vanoise	Aigles de La Roche-sur-Yon
2015-2016	Sangliers Arvernes de Clermont	Jokers de Cergy-Pontoise
2016-2017	Chevaliers du Lac d'Annecy	Yétis du Mont-Blanc
2017-2018	Éléphants de Chambéry	Vipers de Montpellier
2018-2019	Sangliers Arvernes de Clermont	Bouquetins du HCMP
2021-2022	Pingouins de Morzine-Avoriaz	Bélougas de Toulouse-Blagnac
2022-2023	Grizzlys de Vaujany	Les Comètes de Meudon
2023-2024	Ours de Villard-de-Lans	Bouquetins du HCMP
2024-2025	Lions de Lyon	Vipers de Montpellier
2025-2026	Lynx de Valence	Vipers de Montpellier
