= FFHG Division 1 =

Semi-professional ice hockey league in France

- Sport: Ice hockey
- Country: France
- Level on pyramid: 2
- Promotion to: Ligue Magnus
- Relegation to: FFHG Division 2

FFHG Division 1 (Fédération Française de Hockey sur Glace Division 1 or French Ice Hockey Federation Division 1) is a semi-professional ice hockey league in France. In France, there are four levels of national ice hockey. The teams that end at the bottom of the table get relegated to FFHG Division 2 while the top get promoted to Ligue Magnus.

== 2025/26 teams ==
FFHG Division 1 consists of 16 teams.

Teams currently participating in Division 1

Team	City	Arena	Founded
Bisons de Neuilly-sur-Marne	Neuilly-sur-Marne	Patinoire municipale	1974
Corsaires de Dunkerque	Dunkirk	Patinoire Michel-Raffoux	1970
Corsaires de Nantes	Nantes	Centre de loisirs du Petit Port	1984
Courchevel-Méribel-Pralognan Bouquetins	Méribel	Patinoire de Méribel	1990
Diables Rouges de Valenciennes	Valenciennes	Patinoire Valigloo	1971
Dogs de Cholet	Cholet	Glisséo	1992
Drakkars de Caen	Caen	Patinoire de Caen la mer	1968
Éléphants de Chambéry	Chambéry	Patinoire de Buisson rond	1972
Épinal Hockey Club	Épinal	Patinoire de Poissompré	2018
Étoile Noire de Strasbourg	Strasbourg	Patinoire Iceberg	2000
Les Comètes de Meudon	Meudon	UCPA Sport Station	1982
Lyon Hockey Club	Lyon	Patinoire Charlemagne	1898
Ours de Villard-de-Lans	Villard-de-Lans	Patinoire municipale de Villard-de-Lans	1931
Pingouins de Morzine-Avoriaz	Morzine	Škoda Arena	1963
Remparts de Tours	Tours	Centre Municpial des Sports	2010
Yétis du Mont-Blanc	Megève; Saint-Gervais-les-Bains	Le Palais, Megève; Patinoire municipale, Saint-Gervais-les-Bains	1986

== Season ==
During the regular season, each team plays each of the other teams twice: once at home and once away (26 games). In the event of a tie at the end of three periods, one 10-minute overtime period is played based sudden-death rules. If the game is still tied after this period, the teams proceed to a shoot-out to determine a winner.

At the end of this regular season the eight highest-ranking teams enter a series of play-offs. In order to be promoted to the division above (the Ligue Magnus), the winner of the Division 1 play-offs then plays a best-of-three series against the losing team that division. The winning team of that series then qualifies for play in Ligue Magnus the following season, while the losing team stays in (or is relegated to) Division 1.

The four lowest-ranking teams also enter a play-off series in which the losing teams continue, and the overall losing team must play (and win) a best-of-three series against the champion of the FFHG Division 2 in order to avoid being relegated.

== Champions ==
Year	Denomination	Champion
1930–31	second series	Chamonix 2
1931–32	second series	Racing club de France 2
1932–33	second series	Club des Sports d'Hiver de Paris
1933–34	second series	Chamonix 2
1934–35	second series	Stade Français 2
1935–36	second series	Stade Français 2
1936–37	no championship	
1937–38	second series	Unavailable
1938–39	second series	Unavailable
1941–42	second series	Chamonix 2
1942–43	second series	Racing club de France
1943–44	second series	Club des Sports d'Hiver de Paris
1944–45	no championship	
1945–46	no championship	
1946–47	second series	Club des Sports d'Hiver de Paris
1947–48	second series	CO Billancourt
1948–49	second series	Chamonix 2
1949–50	second series	CO Billancourt
1950–51	second series	Paris Université Club
1951–52	second series	Chamonix 2
1952–53	second series	Villard-de-Lans
1953–54	second series	Unavailable
1954–55	second series	Unavailable
1955–56	second series	Saint Gervais
1956–57	second series	Chamonix 2
1957–58	second series	Villard-de-Lans
1958–59	second series	Unavailable
1959–60	second series	Villard-de-Lans
1960–61	second series	US Métro
1961–62	second series	Saint-Gervais
1962–63	second series	ACBB 2
1963–64	second series	ACBB 2
1964–65	second series	Unavailable
1965–66	second series	Unavailable
1966–67	second series	Unavailable
1967–68	second series	Grenoble/Villard 2
1968–69	second series	Grenoble HC
1969–70	second series	Unavailable
1970–71	second series	Grenoble HC
1971–72	second series	Lyon
1972–73	second series	A.S. Grenoble
1973–74	Série B	Megève
1974–75	Série B	Viry-Châtillon
1975–76	Nationale B	Tours
1976–77	Nationale B	Tours
1977–78	Nationale B	Français Volants
1978–79	Nationale B	Caen
1979–80	Nationale B	Lyon
1980–81	Nationale B	Épinal
1981–82	Nationale B	Amiens
1982–83	Nationale B	Lyon
1983–84	Nationale B	Français Volants
1984–85	Nationale B	Rouen
1985–86	Nationale 2	Bordeaux
1986–87	Nationale 1B	Tours
1987–88	Nationale 1B	Viry-Châtillon
1988–89	Nationale 1B	Caen
1989–90	Nationale 1B	Chamonix
1990–91	Division 1	Viry-Châtillon
1991–92	Division 1	Bordeaux
1992–93	Nationale 2	Angers
1993–94	Nationale 2	Reims
1994–95	Nationale 1B	Cherbourg
1995–96	Division 1	Gap
1996–97	Nationale 1B	Briançon
1997–98	Nationale 1	Caen
1998–99	Nationale 1	Clermont
1999-00	Nationale 1	Brest
2000–01	Nationale 1	Villard-de-Lans
2001–02	Division 1	Villard-de-Lans
2002–03	Division 1	Épinal
2003–04	Division 1	Morzine
2004–05	Division 1	Mont-Blanc
2005–06	Division 1	Strasbourg
2006–07	Division 1	Tours
2007–08	Division 1	Neuilly-sur-Marne
2008–09	Division 1	Gap
2009–10	Division 1	Caen
2010–11	Division 1	Neuilly-sur-Marne
2011–12	Division 1	Mulhouse
2012–13	Division 1	Brest
2013–14	Division 1	Lyon
2014–15	Division 1	Bordeaux
2015–16	Division 1	Nice
2016–17	Division 1	Mulhouse
2017–18	Division 1	Hormadi Anglet
2018–19	Division 1	Diables Rouges de Briançon
2019–20	Division 1	not attributed
2020–21	Division 1	Spartiates de Marseille
2021–22	Division 1	Albatros de Brest
2022–23	Division 1	Wildcats d'Épinal
2023–24	Division 1	Corsaires de Nantes
2024–25	Division 1	Wildcats d'Épinal
2025–26	Division 1	Dogs de Cholet
