= Brest Albatros Hockey =

Albatros de Brest
- City: Brest, France
- League: FFHG Division 2
- Founded: 1985, became active in 1991
- Home arena: Rinkla Stadium
- Colours: Black, white and gray
- General manager: Nicolas Favarin
- Head coach: Nicolas Favarin

Brest Albatros Hockey is an ice hockey team in Brest, France. They were founded in 1991, and currently play in the FFHG Division 1, the second level of ice hockey in France. Albatros won the league championship in 1996 and 1997. The team also previously played in the Ligue Magnus.

== Achievements ==
- Ligue Magnus champion (2) : 1996, 1997.
