= 2016 IIHF World Championship rosters =

Ice hockey championship rosters

Each team's roster consisted of at least 15 skaters (forwards and defencemen) and two goaltenders, and at most 22 skaters and three goaltenders. All 16 participating nations, through the confirmation of their respective national associations, had to submit a roster by the first IIHF directorate meeting.

Age and team as of 6 May 2016.

== Group A ==
=== Czech Republic ===
A 25-man roster was announced on 16 April 2016. It was renewed to 27 players on 24 April 2016 and 3 May 2016.

Head coach: Vladimír Vůjtek

No.	Pos.	Name	Height	Weight	Birthdate	Team
5	D	Jakub Jeřábek	1.81 m (5 ft 11 in)	89 kg (196 lb)	May 12, 1991 (aged 24)	(Czech Republic) HC Plzeň
6	D	Michal Kempný – A	1.83 m (6 ft 0 in)	88 kg (194 lb)	September 8, 1990 (aged 25)	(Russia) Avangard Omsk
10	F	Roman Červenka – A	1.81 m (5 ft 11 in)	85 kg (187 lb)	December 10, 1985 (aged 30)	(Switzerland) Fribourg-Gottéron
12	F	Radek Faksa	1.91 m (6 ft 3 in)	96 kg (212 lb)	January 9, 1994 (aged 22)	(United States) Dallas Stars
14	F	Tomáš Plekanec – C	1.79 m (5 ft 10 in)	79 kg (174 lb)	October 31, 1982 (aged 33)	(Canada) Montreal Canadiens
16	F	Michal Birner	1.83 m (6 ft 0 in)	83 kg (183 lb)	March 2, 1986 (aged 30)	(Czech Republic) Bílí Tygři Liberec
22	F	Lukáš Kašpar	1.89 m (6 ft 2 in)	97 kg (214 lb)	September 23, 1985 (aged 30)	(Slovakia) Slovan Bratislava
24	D	Petr Zámorský	1.80 m (5 ft 11 in)	86 kg (190 lb)	August 3, 1992 (aged 23)	(Sweden) Örebro HK
26	F	Martin Zaťovič	1.80 m (5 ft 11 in)	91 kg (201 lb)	January 25, 1985 (aged 31)	(Russia) Lada Togliatti
29	D	Jan Kolář	1.90 m (6 ft 3 in)	95 kg (209 lb)	November 22, 1986 (aged 29)	(Russia) Amur Khabarovsk
33	G	Pavel Francouz	1.82 m (6 ft 0 in)	81 kg (179 lb)	June 3, 1990 (aged 25)	(Russia) Traktor Chelyabinsk
35	G	Matěj Machovský	1.89 m (6 ft 2 in)	85 kg (187 lb)	July 25, 1993 (aged 22)	(Czech Republic) HC Plzeň
38	G	Dominik Furch	1.88 m (6 ft 2 in)	91 kg (201 lb)	April 19, 1990 (aged 26)	(Russia) Avangard Omsk
41	F	Tomáš Filippi	1.85 m (6 ft 1 in)	85 kg (187 lb)	May 4, 1992 (aged 24)	(Russia) Metallurg Magnitogorsk
42	F	Petr Koukal	1.80 m (5 ft 11 in)	82 kg (181 lb)	August 16, 1982 (aged 33)	(Russia) Avtomobilist Yekaterinburg
43	F	Jan Kovář	1.80 m (5 ft 11 in)	94 kg (207 lb)	March 20, 1990 (aged 26)	(Russia) Metallurg Magnitogorsk
45	D	Radim Šimek	1.80 m (5 ft 11 in)	89 kg (196 lb)	September 20, 1992 (aged 23)	(Czech Republic) Bílí Tygři Liberec
47	D	Michal Jordán	1.85 m (6 ft 1 in)	90 kg (200 lb)	July 17, 1990 (aged 25)	(United States) Carolina Hurricanes
52	D	Milan Doudera	1.83 m (6 ft 0 in)	90 kg (200 lb)	January 1, 1993 (aged 23)	(Czech Republic) Oceláři Třinec
62	F	Michal Řepík	1.78 m (5 ft 10 in)	82 kg (181 lb)	December 31, 1988 (aged 27)	(Czech Republic) Bílí Tygři Liberec
79	F	Tomáš Zohorna	1.85 m (6 ft 1 in)	91 kg (201 lb)	January 3, 1988 (aged 28)	(Russia) Amur Khabarovsk
84	D	Tomáš Kundrátek	1.87 m (6 ft 2 in)	91 kg (201 lb)	December 26, 1989 (aged 26)	(Slovakia) Slovan Bratislava
88	F	David Pastrňák	1.83 m (6 ft 0 in)	82 kg (181 lb)	May 25, 1996 (aged 19)	(United States) Boston Bruins
90	F	Robert Kousal	1.86 m (6 ft 1 in)	89 kg (196 lb)	October 7, 1990 (aged 25)	(Russia) Metallurg Novokuznetsk
96	F	Richard Jarůšek	1.89 m (6 ft 2 in)	98 kg (216 lb)	August 8, 1991 (aged 24)	(Czech Republic) BK Mladá Boleslav

=== Denmark ===
A 23-man roster was announced on 11 April 2016. A 25-player roster was unveiled on 25 April 2016. The final was roster was revealed on 1 May 2016.

Head coach: Janne Karlsson

No.	Pos.	Name	Height	Weight	Birthdate	Team
4	D	Mads Bødker	1.75 m (5 ft 9 in)	80 kg (180 lb)	August 31, 1987 (aged 28)	(Denmark) SønderjyskE
5	D	Daniel Nielsen	1.82 m (6 ft 0 in)	83 kg (183 lb)	October 31, 1980 (aged 35)	(Denmark) Herning Blue Fox
6	D	Stefan Lassen	1.90 m (6 ft 3 in)	90 kg (200 lb)	November 1, 1985 (aged 30)	(Finland) Lahti Pelicans
9	F	Frederik Storm	1.80 m (5 ft 11 in)	86 kg (190 lb)	February 20, 1989 (aged 27)	(Sweden) Malmö Redhawks
11	F	Patrick Bjorkstrand	1.84 m (6 ft 0 in)	87 kg (192 lb)	July 1, 1992 (aged 23)	(Croatia) KHL Medveščak Zagreb
12	F	Mads Christensen	1.79 m (5 ft 10 in)	80 kg (180 lb)	April 2, 1987 (aged 29)	(Germany) EHC München
13	F	Morten Green – C	1.83 m (6 ft 0 in)	88 kg (194 lb)	March 19, 1981 (aged 35)	(Denmark) Rungsted Seier Capital
14	F	Kirill Starkov	1.84 m (6 ft 0 in)	95 kg (209 lb)	March 31, 1987 (aged 29)	(Switzerland) HC Red Ice
17	F	Nicklas Jensen	1.91 m (6 ft 3 in)	85 kg (187 lb)	March 6, 1993 (aged 23)	(United States) Hartford Wolf Pack
20	F	Mathias From	1.85 m (6 ft 1 in)	73 kg (161 lb)	December 16, 1997 (aged 18)	(Sweden) Rögle BK
22	D	Markus Lauridsen	1.88 m (6 ft 2 in)	89 kg (196 lb)	February 28, 1991 (aged 25)	(Sweden) AIK
24	F	Nikolaj Ehlers	1.85 m (6 ft 1 in)	80 kg (180 lb)	February 14, 1996 (aged 20)	(Canada) Winnipeg Jets
25	D	Oliver Lauridsen	1.97 m (6 ft 6 in)	104 kg (229 lb)	March 24, 1989 (aged 27)	(Sweden) Frölunda HC
28	D	Emil Kristensen	1.84 m (6 ft 0 in)	84 kg (185 lb)	September 20, 1992 (aged 23)	(Sweden) IK Oskarshamn
29	F	Morten Madsen – A	1.90 m (6 ft 3 in)	87 kg (192 lb)	January 16, 1987 (aged 29)	(Germany) Hamburg Freezers
31	G	Simon Nielsen	1.88 m (6 ft 2 in)	80 kg (180 lb)	October 27, 1986 (aged 29)	(Denmark) Herning Blue Fox
32	G	Sebastian Dahm	1.86 m (6 ft 1 in)	82 kg (181 lb)	February 28, 1987 (aged 29)	(Austria) Graz 99ers
36	F	Jannik Hansen	1.85 m (6 ft 1 in)	92 kg (203 lb)	March 15, 1986 (aged 30)	(Canada) Vancouver Canucks
38	F	Morten Poulsen	1.84 m (6 ft 0 in)	84 kg (185 lb)	September 9, 1988 (aged 27)	(Austria) Graz 99ers
39	G	Georg Sørensen	1.76 m (5 ft 9 in)	75 kg (165 lb)	May 15, 1995 (aged 20)	(Denmark) Frederikshavn White Hawks
41	D	Jesper Jensen – A	1.83 m (6 ft 0 in)	84 kg (185 lb)	July 30, 1991 (aged 24)	(Finland) Jokerit
42	F	Mikkel Aagaard	1.80 m (5 ft 11 in)	81 kg (179 lb)	October 18, 1995 (aged 20)	(Canada) Sudbury Wolves
48	D	Nicholas Jensen	1.89 m (6 ft 2 in)	90 kg (200 lb)	April 8, 1989 (aged 27)	(Denmark) Esbjerg Energy
50	F	Mathias Bau Hansen	2.00 m (6 ft 7 in)	108 kg (238 lb)	July 3, 1993 (aged 22)	(Denmark) Frederikshavn White Hawks
81	F	Lars Eller	1.85 m (6 ft 1 in)	90 kg (200 lb)	May 8, 1989 (aged 26)	(Canada) Montreal Canadiens

=== Kazakhstan ===
A 54-man roster was announced on 24 March 2016.

Head coach: Andrei Nazarov

No.	Pos.	Name	Height	Weight	Birthdate	Team
1	G	Pavel Poluektov	1.81 m (5 ft 11 in)	80 kg (180 lb)	January 20, 1992 (aged 24)	(Kazakhstan) Barys Astana
2	D	Roman Savchenko	1.89 m (6 ft 2 in)	87 kg (192 lb)	July 28, 1988 (aged 27)	(Kazakhstan) Barys Astana
3	D	Vyacheslav Tryasunov	1.82 m (6 ft 0 in)	86 kg (190 lb)	June 24, 1985 (aged 30)	(Kazakhstan) Barys Astana
5	D	Andrei Korabeinikov	1.84 m (6 ft 0 in)	82 kg (181 lb)	April 1, 1987 (aged 29)	(Russia) Toros Neftekamsk
7	D	Maxim Semyonov	1.82 m (6 ft 0 in)	81 kg (179 lb)	February 9, 1984 (aged 32)	(Kazakhstan) Barys Astana
9	F	Nigel Dawes – A	1.73 m (5 ft 8 in)	81 kg (179 lb)	February 9, 1985 (aged 31)	(Kazakhstan) Barys Astana
15	F	Maxim Khudyakov	1.71 m (5 ft 7 in)	75 kg (165 lb)	August 18, 1986 (aged 29)	(Kazakhstan) Barys Astana
17	F	Mikhail Panshin	1.82 m (6 ft 0 in)	78 kg (172 lb)	May 2, 1983 (aged 33)	(Kazakhstan) Barys Astana
20	G	Vitali Kolesnik	1.90 m (6 ft 3 in)	92 kg (203 lb)	August 20, 1979 (aged 36)	(Russia) Lokomotiv Yaroslavl
22	F	Roman Starchenko – C	1.78 m (5 ft 10 in)	82 kg (181 lb)	May 12, 1986 (aged 29)	(Kazakhstan) Barys Astana
27	F	Brandon Bochenski – A	1.84 m (6 ft 0 in)	86 kg (190 lb)	April 4, 1982 (aged 34)	(Kazakhstan) Barys Astana
29	F	Dmitri Grents	1.85 m (6 ft 1 in)	85 kg (187 lb)	June 10, 1996 (aged 19)	(Kazakhstan) Barys Astana
32	G	Dmitri Malgin	1.86 m (6 ft 1 in)	83 kg (183 lb)	July 28, 1987 (aged 28)	(Kazakhstan) Barys Astana
41	F	Dustin Boyd	1.83 m (6 ft 0 in)	85 kg (187 lb)	July 16, 1986 (aged 29)	(Kazakhstan) Barys Astana
46	D	Alexander Lipin	1.87 m (6 ft 2 in)	100 kg (220 lb)	December 19, 1985 (aged 30)	(Kazakhstan) Barys Astana
49	F	Alexander Shin	1.85 m (6 ft 1 in)	74 kg (163 lb)	November 21, 1985 (aged 30)	(Kazakhstan) Kazzinc-Torpedo
52	F	Ilya Solaryov	1.92 m (6 ft 4 in)	91 kg (201 lb)	August 2, 1982 (aged 33)	(Kazakhstan) Barys Astana
53	F	Vladimir Markelov	1.75 m (5 ft 9 in)	82 kg (181 lb)	August 31, 1987 (aged 28)	(Kazakhstan) Arlan Kokshetau
62	F	Vadim Krasnoslobodtsev	1.90 m (6 ft 3 in)	90 kg (200 lb)	August 16, 1983 (aged 32)	(Kazakhstan) Barys Astana
69	D	Ilya Lobanov	1.99 m (6 ft 6 in)	97 kg (214 lb)	December 1, 1996 (aged 19)	(Kazakhstan) Barys Astana
81	F	Konstantin Pushkaryov	1.81 m (5 ft 11 in)	78 kg (172 lb)	February 12, 1985 (aged 31)	(Kazakhstan) Barys Astana
87	D	Artemi Lakiza	1.78 m (5 ft 10 in)	82 kg (181 lb)	July 2, 1987 (aged 28)	(Kazakhstan) Barys Astana
88	F	Evgeni Rymarev	1.75 m (5 ft 9 in)	76 kg (168 lb)	September 9, 1988 (aged 27)	(Kazakhstan) Kazzinc-Torpedo
91	F	Nikita Ivanov	1.93 m (6 ft 4 in)	95 kg (209 lb)	March 31, 1989 (aged 27)	(Kazakhstan) Saryarka Karagandy
94	D	Daniar Kairov	1.82 m (6 ft 0 in)	95 kg (209 lb)	April 5, 1994 (aged 22)	(Kazakhstan) Barys Astana

=== Latvia ===
A 22-man roster was announced on 13 April 2016. The final roster was revealed on 4 May 2016.

Head coach: Leonīds Beresņevs

No.	Pos.	Name	Height	Weight	Birthdate	Team
1	G	Jānis Kalniņš	1.82 m (6 ft 0 in)	87 kg (192 lb)	December 13, 1991 (aged 24)	(Hungary) Fehérvár AV19
3	D	Maksims Širokovs	1.81 m (5 ft 11 in)	87 kg (192 lb)	December 13, 1982 (aged 33)	(Italy) WSV Sterzing Broncos
5	D	Edgars Siksna	1.86 m (6 ft 1 in)	93 kg (205 lb)	January 15, 1993 (aged 23)	(Kazakhstan) Saryarka Karaganda
8	F	Aleksejs Širokovs	1.80 m (5 ft 11 in)	89 kg (196 lb)	February 20, 1981 (aged 35)	(Russia) Neftyanik Almetievsk
11	D	Kristaps Sotnieks	1.83 m (6 ft 0 in)	93 kg (205 lb)	January 29, 1987 (aged 29)	(Latvia) Dinamo Riga
13	D	Guntis Galviņš	1.86 m (6 ft 1 in)	87 kg (192 lb)	January 25, 1986 (aged 30)	(Latvia) Dinamo Riga
16	F	Kaspars Daugaviņš – C	1.83 m (6 ft 0 in)	97 kg (214 lb)	May 18, 1988 (aged 27)	(Russia) Torpedo Nizhny Novgorod
18	F	Rodrigo Ābols	1.95 m (6 ft 5 in)	84 kg (185 lb)	January 5, 1996 (aged 20)	(United States) Portland Winterhawks
21	F	Gunārs Skvorcovs	1.87 m (6 ft 2 in)	97 kg (214 lb)	January 13, 1990 (aged 26)	(Latvia) Dinamo Riga
22	D	Jānis Andersons	1.87 m (6 ft 2 in)	88 kg (194 lb)	October 7, 1986 (aged 29)	(Slovakia) HKM Zvolen
23	D	Aleksandrs Jerofejevs	1.90 m (6 ft 3 in)	93 kg (205 lb)	April 12, 1984 (aged 32)	(Latvia) Dinamo Riga
24	F	Miķelis Rēdlihs	1.81 m (5 ft 11 in)	81 kg (179 lb)	July 1, 1984 (aged 31)	(Latvia) Dinamo Riga
25	F	Andris Džeriņš	1.85 m (6 ft 1 in)	85 kg (187 lb)	February 14, 1988 (aged 28)	(Latvia) Dinamo Riga
27	D	Oskars Cibuļskis	1.88 m (6 ft 2 in)	86 kg (190 lb)	April 9, 1988 (aged 28)	(Latvia) Dinamo Riga
28	F	Zemgus Girgensons – A	1.88 m (6 ft 2 in)	92 kg (203 lb)	January 5, 1994 (aged 22)	(United States) Buffalo Sabres
29	D	Ralfs Freibergs	1.80 m (5 ft 11 in)	87 kg (192 lb)	May 17, 1991 (aged 24)	(United States) Toledo Walleye
30	G	Elvis Merzļikins	1.91 m (6 ft 3 in)	85 kg (187 lb)	April 13, 1994 (aged 22)	(Switzerland) HC Lugano
31	G	Edgars Masaļskis	1.75 m (5 ft 9 in)	78 kg (172 lb)	March 31, 1980 (aged 36)	(Russia) Lada Togliatti
70	F	Miks Indrašis	1.92 m (6 ft 4 in)	85 kg (187 lb)	September 30, 1990 (aged 25)	(Latvia) Dinamo Riga
71	F	Roberts Bukarts	1.84 m (6 ft 0 in)	84 kg (185 lb)	June 27, 1990 (aged 25)	(Czech Republic) PSG Zlín
79	F	Vitalijs Pavlovs	1.93 m (6 ft 4 in)	101 kg (223 lb)	June 17, 1989 (aged 26)	(Latvia) Dinamo Riga
87	F	Gints Meija – A	1.85 m (6 ft 1 in)	90 kg (200 lb)	September 4, 1987 (aged 28)	(Latvia) Dinamo Riga
91	F	Ronalds Ķēniņš	1.82 m (6 ft 0 in)	91 kg (201 lb)	July 29, 1994 (aged 21)	(Canada) Vancouver Canucks
94	F	Edgars Kulda	1.84 m (6 ft 0 in)	86 kg (190 lb)	November 13, 1994 (aged 21)	(Latvia) Dinamo Riga
96	F	Māris Bičevskis	1.80 m (5 ft 11 in)	82 kg (181 lb)	August 3, 1991 (aged 24)	(Latvia) Dinamo Riga

=== Norway ===
A 26-man roster was announced on 11 April 2016. It was made of 28 players on 28 April 2016. The final roster was announced 1 May 2016.

Head coach: Roy Johansen

No.	Pos.	Name	Height	Weight	Birthdate	Team
4	D	Johannes Johannessen	1.81 m (5 ft 11 in)	85 kg (187 lb)	March 1, 1997 (aged 19)	(Norway) Stavanger Oilers
6	D	Jonas Holøs	1.80 m (5 ft 11 in)	93 kg (205 lb)	August 27, 1987 (aged 28)	(Sweden) Färjestad BK
8	F	Mathias Trettenes	1.79 m (5 ft 10 in)	76 kg (168 lb)	November 8, 1993 (aged 22)	(Norway) Stavanger Oilers
10	D	Mattias Nørstebø	1.78 m (5 ft 10 in)	82 kg (181 lb)	June 3, 1995 (aged 20)	(Sweden) Brynäs IF
11	F	Andreas Stene	1.90 m (6 ft 3 in)	91 kg (201 lb)	March 1, 1991 (aged 25)	(Sweden) Mora IK
12	F	Michael Haga	1.80 m (5 ft 11 in)	77 kg (170 lb)	March 10, 1992 (aged 24)	(Sweden) Almtuna IS
14	D	Dennis Sveum	1.85 m (6 ft 1 in)	86 kg (190 lb)	November 27, 1986 (aged 29)	(Norway) Stavanger Oilers
20	F	Anders Bastiansen – A	1.90 m (6 ft 3 in)	93 kg (205 lb)	October 31, 1980 (aged 35)	(Norway) Frisk Asker Ishockey
21	F	Morten Ask	1.85 m (6 ft 1 in)	88 kg (194 lb)	May 14, 1980 (aged 35)	(Norway) Vålerenga Ishockey
22	F	Martin Røymark	1.84 m (6 ft 0 in)	86 kg (190 lb)	November 10, 1986 (aged 29)	(Sweden) Färjestad BK
23	D	Mats Trygg – A	1.79 m (5 ft 10 in)	85 kg (187 lb)	June 1, 1976 (aged 39)	(Norway) Lørenskog IK
24	F	Andreas Martinsen	1.90 m (6 ft 3 in)	100 kg (220 lb)	June 13, 1990 (aged 25)	(United States) Colorado Avalanche
26	F	Kristian Forsberg	1.83 m (6 ft 0 in)	88 kg (194 lb)	May 5, 1986 (aged 30)	(Norway) Stavanger Oilers
28	F	Niklas Roest	1.74 m (5 ft 9 in)	80 kg (180 lb)	August 3, 1986 (aged 29)	(Norway) Sparta Warriors
29	F	Robin Dahlstrøm	1.83 m (6 ft 0 in)	100 kg (220 lb)	January 29, 1988 (aged 28)	(Norway) Lørenskog IK
30	G	Lars Haugen	1.85 m (6 ft 1 in)	83 kg (183 lb)	March 19, 1987 (aged 29)	(Sweden) Färjestad BK
31	G	Lars Volden	1.90 m (6 ft 3 in)	95 kg (209 lb)	July 26, 1992 (aged 23)	(Sweden) Rögle BK
36	F	Mats Zuccarello	1.71 m (5 ft 7 in)	74 kg (163 lb)	September 1, 1987 (aged 28)	(United States) New York Rangers
40	F	Ken André Olimb	1.79 m (5 ft 10 in)	81 kg (179 lb)	January 21, 1989 (aged 27)	(Germany) Düsseldorfer EG
42	D	Henrik Ødegaard	1.80 m (5 ft 11 in)	89 kg (196 lb)	February 12, 1988 (aged 28)	(Norway) Lørenskog IK
46	F	Mathis Olimb	1.77 m (5 ft 10 in)	79 kg (174 lb)	February 1, 1986 (aged 30)	(Finland) Jokerit
51	F	Mats Rosseli Olsen	1.80 m (5 ft 11 in)	83 kg (183 lb)	April 29, 1991 (aged 25)	(Sweden) Frölunda HC
55	D	Ole-Kristian Tollefsen – C	1.87 m (6 ft 2 in)	94 kg (207 lb)	March 29, 1984 (aged 32)	(Sweden) Färjestad BK
70	G	Steffen Søberg	1.80 m (5 ft 11 in)	78 kg (172 lb)	August 6, 1993 (aged 22)	(Norway) Vålerenga Ishockey
93	F	Thomas Valkvæ Olsen	1.86 m (6 ft 1 in)	88 kg (194 lb)	May 18, 1993 (aged 22)	(Norway) Frisk Asker Ishockey

=== Russia ===
A 26-man roster was announced on 7 April 2016. It was reduced to 23 on 30 April 2016. The final roster was announced on 4 May 2016.

Head coach: Oleg Znarok

No.	Pos.	Name	Height	Weight	Birthdate	Team
7	F	Ivan Telegin	1.93 m (6 ft 4 in)	92 kg (203 lb)	February 28, 1992 (aged 24)	(Russia) CSKA Moscow
8	F	Alexander Ovechkin	1.90 m (6 ft 3 in)	100 kg (220 lb)	September 17, 1985 (aged 30)	(United States) Washington Capitals
9	D	Viktor Antipin	1.75 m (5 ft 9 in)	80 kg (180 lb)	December 6, 1992 (aged 23)	(Russia) Metallurg Magnitogorsk
10	F	Sergei Mozyakin – A	1.80 m (5 ft 11 in)	87 kg (192 lb)	March 30, 1981 (aged 35)	(Russia) Metallurg Magnitogorsk
13	F	Pavel Datsyuk – C	1.80 m (5 ft 11 in)	88 kg (194 lb)	July 20, 1978 (aged 37)	(United States) Detroit Red Wings
16	F	Sergei Plotnikov	1.88 m (6 ft 2 in)	90 kg (200 lb)	June 3, 1990 (aged 25)	(United States) Arizona Coyotes
22	D	Nikita Zaitsev	1.89 m (6 ft 2 in)	89 kg (196 lb)	October 29, 1991 (aged 24)	(Canada) Toronto Maple Leafs
23	F	Roman Lyubimov	1.88 m (6 ft 2 in)	94 kg (207 lb)	January 6, 1992 (aged 24)	(Russia) CSKA Moscow
26	D	Slava Voynov	1.82 m (6 ft 0 in)	84 kg (185 lb)	January 15, 1990 (aged 26)	(Russia) SKA Saint Petersburg
27	F	Artemi Panarin	1.80 m (5 ft 11 in)	77 kg (170 lb)	October 30, 1991 (aged 24)	(United States) Chicago Blackhawks
30	G	Igor Shestyorkin	1.85 m (6 ft 1 in)	85 kg (187 lb)	December 30, 1995 (aged 20)	(Russia) SKA Saint Petersburg
31	G	Ilya Sorokin	1.88 m (6 ft 2 in)	78 kg (172 lb)	August 4, 1995 (aged 20)	(Russia) CSKA Moscow
39	F	Stepan Sannikov	1.83 m (6 ft 0 in)	91 kg (201 lb)	September 25, 1990 (aged 25)	(Russia) Sibir Novosibirsk
40	F	Sergei Kalinin	1.90 m (6 ft 3 in)	86 kg (190 lb)	March 17, 1991 (aged 25)	(United States) New Jersey Devils
52	F	Sergei Shirokov	1.78 m (5 ft 10 in)	89 kg (196 lb)	March 10, 1986 (aged 30)	(Russia) SKA Saint Petersburg
53	D	Alexei Marchenko	1.88 m (6 ft 2 in)	96 kg (212 lb)	January 2, 1992 (aged 24)	(United States) Detroit Red Wings
63	F	Evgenii Dadonov	1.79 m (5 ft 10 in)	84 kg (185 lb)	March 12, 1989 (aged 27)	(Russia) SKA Saint Petersburg
72	G	Sergei Bobrovsky	1.88 m (6 ft 2 in)	86 kg (190 lb)	September 20, 1988 (aged 27)	(United States) Columbus Blue Jackets
73	D	Maxim Chudinov	1.80 m (5 ft 11 in)	92 kg (203 lb)	March 25, 1990 (aged 26)	(Russia) SKA Saint Petersburg
74	D	Alexei Emelin	1.85 m (6 ft 1 in)	97 kg (214 lb)	April 25, 1986 (aged 30)	(Canada) Montreal Canadiens
77	D	Anton Belov	1.93 m (6 ft 4 in)	97 kg (214 lb)	July 29, 1986 (aged 29)	(Russia) SKA Saint Petersburg
81	D	Dmitry Orlov	1.82 m (6 ft 0 in)	91 kg (201 lb)	July 23, 1991 (aged 24)	(United States) Washington Capitals
87	F	Vadim Shipachyov – A	1.83 m (6 ft 0 in)	85 kg (187 lb)	March 12, 1987 (aged 29)	(Russia) SKA Saint Petersburg
92	F	Evgeny Kuznetsov	1.86 m (6 ft 1 in)	87 kg (192 lb)	May 19, 1992 (aged 23)	(United States) Washington Capitals
96	F	Alexander Burmistrov	1.85 m (6 ft 1 in)	82 kg (181 lb)	October 21, 1991 (aged 24)	(Canada) Winnipeg Jets

=== Sweden ===
A 24-man roster was announced on 22 April 2016. The final roster was announced on 2 May 2016.

Head coach: Pär Mårts

No.	Pos.	Name	Height	Weight	Birthdate	Team
4	D	Mattias Ekholm	1.93 m (6 ft 4 in)	93 kg (205 lb)	May 24, 1990 (aged 25)	(United States) Nashville Predators
5	D	Adam Larsson	1.91 m (6 ft 3 in)	93 kg (205 lb)	November 12, 1992 (aged 23)	(United States) New Jersey Devils
6	D	Oscar Fantenberg	1.84 m (6 ft 0 in)	92 kg (203 lb)	October 7, 1991 (aged 24)	(Sweden) Frölunda HC
7	F	Patrick Cehlin	1.80 m (5 ft 11 in)	76 kg (168 lb)	July 27, 1991 (aged 24)	(Sweden) Rögle BK
10	D	Johan Fransson	1.87 m (6 ft 2 in)	90 kg (200 lb)	February 18, 1985 (aged 31)	(Switzerland) Genève-Servette HC
13	F	Mattias Ritola	1.82 m (6 ft 0 in)	89 kg (196 lb)	March 14, 1987 (aged 29)	(Sweden) Skellefteå AIK
14	F	Gustav Nyquist	1.82 m (6 ft 0 in)	83 kg (183 lb)	September 1, 1989 (aged 26)	(United States) Detroit Red Wings
15	F	Mattias Sjögren	1.89 m (6 ft 2 in)	97 kg (214 lb)	November 27, 1987 (aged 28)	(Russia) Ak Bars Kazan
18	F	Mikael Backlund – A	1.84 m (6 ft 0 in)	90 kg (200 lb)	March 17, 1989 (aged 27)	(Canada) Calgary Flames
21	F	Jimmie Ericsson – C	1.87 m (6 ft 2 in)	94 kg (207 lb)	February 22, 1980 (aged 36)	(Sweden) Skellefteå AIK
25	G	Jacob Markström	1.98 m (6 ft 6 in)	89 kg (196 lb)	January 31, 1990 (aged 26)	(Canada) Vancouver Canucks
27	F	Martin Lundberg	1.84 m (6 ft 0 in)	95 kg (209 lb)	June 7, 1990 (aged 25)	(Sweden) Skellefteå AIK
28	F	Johan Sundström	1.89 m (6 ft 2 in)	91 kg (201 lb)	September 21, 1992 (aged 23)	(Sweden) Frölunda HC
29	D	Erik Gustafsson – A	1.80 m (5 ft 11 in)	82 kg (181 lb)	December 15, 1988 (aged 27)	(Switzerland) Kloten Flyers
30	G	Viktor Fasth	1.83 m (6 ft 0 in)	87 kg (192 lb)	August 8, 1982 (aged 33)	(Russia) CSKA Moscow
32	D	Magnus Nygren	1.85 m (6 ft 1 in)	87 kg (192 lb)	June 7, 1990 (aged 25)	(Sweden) Färjestad BK
35	G	Joel Lassinantti	1.75 m (5 ft 9 in)	80 kg (180 lb)	January 8, 1993 (aged 23)	(Sweden) Luleå HF
37	F	John Norman	1.80 m (5 ft 11 in)	80 kg (180 lb)	January 6, 1991 (aged 25)	(Sweden) Skellefteå AIK
41	F	Alexander Wennberg	1.86 m (6 ft 1 in)	85 kg (187 lb)	September 22, 1994 (aged 21)	(United States) Columbus Blue Jackets
54	D	Anton Lindholm	1.80 m (5 ft 11 in)	88 kg (194 lb)	November 29, 1994 (aged 21)	(Sweden) Skellefteå AIK
56	D	Erik Gustafsson	1.84 m (6 ft 0 in)	80 kg (180 lb)	March 14, 1992 (aged 24)	(United States) Chicago Blackhawks
65	F	André Burakovsky	1.87 m (6 ft 2 in)	92 kg (203 lb)	February 9, 1995 (aged 21)	(United States) Washington Capitals
67	F	Linus Omark	1.80 m (5 ft 11 in)	82 kg (181 lb)	February 5, 1987 (aged 29)	(Russia) Salavat Yulaev Ufa
86	F	Linus Klasen	1.76 m (5 ft 9 in)	82 kg (181 lb)	February 19, 1986 (aged 30)	(Switzerland) HC Lugano
87	F	Robert Rosén	1.80 m (5 ft 11 in)	80 kg (180 lb)	June 25, 1987 (aged 28)	(Sweden) Växjö Lakers

=== Switzerland ===
A 30-man roster was announced on 16 April 2016. It was reduced to 28 on 25 April 2016. The final roster was announced on 1 May 2016.

Head coach: Patrick Fischer

No.	Pos.	Name	Height	Weight	Birthdate	Team
4	D	Patrick Geering	1.78 m (5 ft 10 in)	88 kg (194 lb)	February 12, 1990 (aged 26)	(Switzerland) ZSC Lions
6	D	Yannick Weber	1.79 m (5 ft 10 in)	89 kg (196 lb)	September 23, 1988 (aged 27)	(Canada) Vancouver Canucks
10	F	Andres Ambühl – C	1.76 m (5 ft 9 in)	82 kg (181 lb)	September 14, 1983 (aged 32)	(Switzerland) HC Davos
13	D	Félicien Du Bois	1.87 m (6 ft 2 in)	84 kg (185 lb)	October 18, 1983 (aged 32)	(Switzerland) HC Davos
15	F	Grégory Hofmann	1.82 m (6 ft 0 in)	80 kg (180 lb)	November 13, 1992 (aged 23)	(Switzerland) HC Lugano
16	D	Raphael Diaz – A	1.81 m (5 ft 11 in)	88 kg (194 lb)	January 9, 1986 (aged 30)	(United States) New York Rangers
19	F	Reto Schäppi	1.94 m (6 ft 4 in)	97 kg (214 lb)	January 27, 1991 (aged 25)	(Switzerland) ZSC Lions
20	G	Reto Berra	1.94 m (6 ft 4 in)	89 kg (196 lb)	January 3, 1987 (aged 29)	(United States) Colorado Avalanche
22	F	Nino Niederreiter	1.85 m (6 ft 1 in)	92 kg (203 lb)	September 8, 1992 (aged 23)	(United States) Minnesota Wild
29	G	Robert Mayer	1.85 m (6 ft 1 in)	89 kg (196 lb)	October 9, 1989 (aged 26)	(Switzerland) Genève-Servette HC
32	D	Noah Schneeberger	1.87 m (6 ft 2 in)	85 kg (187 lb)	May 23, 1988 (aged 27)	(Switzerland) HC Davos
39	G	Sandro Zurkirchen	1.78 m (5 ft 10 in)	75 kg (165 lb)	February 25, 1990 (aged 26)	(Switzerland) HC Ambrì-Piotta
43	F	Morris Trachsler	1.83 m (6 ft 0 in)	90 kg (200 lb)	July 15, 1984 (aged 31)	(Switzerland) ZSC Lions
53	D	Christian Marti	1.92 m (6 ft 4 in)	95 kg (209 lb)	March 29, 1993 (aged 23)	(United States) Lehigh Valley Phantoms
56	F	Dino Wieser	1.80 m (5 ft 11 in)	83 kg (183 lb)	June 13, 1989 (aged 26)	(Switzerland) HC Davos
58	D	Eric Blum	1.78 m (5 ft 10 in)	82 kg (181 lb)	June 13, 1986 (aged 29)	(Switzerland) SC Bern
65	F	Marc Wieser	1.81 m (5 ft 11 in)	83 kg (183 lb)	October 13, 1987 (aged 28)	(Switzerland) HC Davos
70	F	Denis Hollenstein	1.83 m (6 ft 0 in)	90 kg (200 lb)	October 15, 1989 (aged 26)	(Switzerland) Kloten Flyers
77	D	Robin Grossmann	1.80 m (5 ft 11 in)	85 kg (187 lb)	August 17, 1987 (aged 28)	(Switzerland) EV Zug
82	F	Simon Moser – A	1.87 m (6 ft 2 in)	95 kg (209 lb)	March 10, 1989 (aged 27)	(Switzerland) SC Bern
85	F	Sven Andrighetto	1.75 m (5 ft 9 in)	83 kg (183 lb)	March 21, 1993 (aged 23)	(Canada) Montreal Canadiens
92	F	Gaëtan Haas	1.81 m (5 ft 11 in)	80 kg (180 lb)	January 31, 1992 (aged 24)	(Switzerland) EHC Biel
93	F	Lino Martschini	1.68 m (5 ft 6 in)	65 kg (143 lb)	January 21, 1993 (aged 23)	(Switzerland) EV Zug
94	F	Samuel Walser	1.90 m (6 ft 3 in)	95 kg (209 lb)	June 5, 1992 (aged 23)	(Switzerland) HC Davos
95	F	Julian Walker	1.87 m (6 ft 2 in)	94 kg (207 lb)	September 10, 1986 (aged 29)	(Switzerland) HC Lugano

== Group B ==
=== Belarus ===
A 29-man roster was announced on 13 April 2016.

Head coach: Dave Lewis

No.	Pos.	Name	Height	Weight	Birthdate	Team
1	G	Vitali Koval	1.88 m (6 ft 2 in)	97 kg (214 lb)	March 31, 1980 (aged 36)	(Sweden) VIK Västerås
2	D	Kirill Gotovets	1.83 m (6 ft 0 in)	84 kg (185 lb)	June 25, 1991 (aged 24)	(United States) Rockford IceHogs
8	D	Ilya Shinkevich	1.89 m (6 ft 2 in)	86 kg (190 lb)	September 1, 1989 (aged 26)	(Belarus) Dinamo Minsk
9	D	Roman Dyukov	1.87 m (6 ft 2 in)	92 kg (203 lb)	September 29, 1995 (aged 20)	(Belarus) Yunost Minsk
13	F	Sergei Drozd	1.81 m (5 ft 11 in)	77 kg (170 lb)	April 14, 1990 (aged 26)	(Belarus) Dinamo Minsk
14	D	Yevgeni Lisovets	1.83 m (6 ft 0 in)	90 kg (200 lb)	November 12, 1994 (aged 21)	(Belarus) Dinamo Minsk
15	F	Artyom Demkov	1.78 m (5 ft 10 in)	78 kg (172 lb)	September 26, 1989 (aged 26)	(Belarus) Shakhtyor Soligorsk
16	F	Geoff Platt	1.76 m (5 ft 9 in)	82 kg (181 lb)	July 10, 1985 (aged 30)	(Russia) CSKA Moscow
17	F	Alexei Kalyuzhny – C	1.77 m (5 ft 10 in)	86 kg (190 lb)	June 13, 1977 (aged 38)	(Belarus) Dinamo Minsk
18	D	Kristian Khenkel	1.82 m (6 ft 0 in)	85 kg (187 lb)	November 7, 1995 (aged 20)	(Belarus) Yunost Minsk
19	F	Nikita Komarov	1.87 m (6 ft 2 in)	90 kg (200 lb)	June 28, 1988 (aged 27)	(Belarus) Dinamo Minsk
23	F	Andrei Stas	1.89 m (6 ft 2 in)	88 kg (194 lb)	October 18, 1988 (aged 27)	(Russia) Neftekhimik Nizhnekamsk
25	D	Oleg Yevenko	2.01 m (6 ft 7 in)	104 kg (229 lb)	January 21, 1991 (aged 25)	(United States) Lake Erie Monsters
26	D	Nikita Ustinenko	1.86 m (6 ft 1 in)	78 kg (172 lb)	April 22, 1995 (aged 21)	(Belarus) Dinamo Minsk
35	G	Kevin Lalande	1.82 m (6 ft 0 in)	83 kg (183 lb)	February 19, 1987 (aged 29)	(Belarus) Dinamo Minsk
40	G	Dmitry Milchakov	1.83 m (6 ft 0 in)	78 kg (172 lb)	March 2, 1986 (aged 30)	(Belarus) Dinamo Minsk
46	F	Andrei Kostitsyn – A	1.83 m (6 ft 0 in)	103 kg (227 lb)	February 3, 1985 (aged 31)	(Russia) HC Sochi
61	F	Andrei Stepanov	1.78 m (5 ft 10 in)	91 kg (201 lb)	April 14, 1986 (aged 30)	(Belarus) Dinamo Minsk
70	F	Charles Linglet	1.88 m (6 ft 2 in)	92 kg (203 lb)	June 22, 1982 (aged 33)	(Belarus) Dinamo Minsk
71	F	Alexander Pavlovich	1.84 m (6 ft 0 in)	86 kg (190 lb)	July 12, 1988 (aged 27)	(Belarus) Dinamo Minsk
74	F	Sergei Kostitsyn	1.83 m (6 ft 0 in)	96 kg (212 lb)	March 20, 1987 (aged 29)	(Russia) Torpedo Nizhny Novgorod
77	F	Alexander Kitarov	1.90 m (6 ft 3 in)	96 kg (212 lb)	June 18, 1987 (aged 28)	(Russia) Neftekhimik Nizhnekamsk
88	F	Yevgeni Kovyrshin	1.78 m (5 ft 10 in)	78 kg (172 lb)	January 25, 1986 (aged 30)	(Russia) Severstal Cherepovets
89	D	Dmitry Korobov – A	1.90 m (6 ft 3 in)	108 kg (238 lb)	March 12, 1989 (aged 27)	(Russia) Atlant Moscow Oblast
91	F	Artur Gavrus	1.79 m (5 ft 10 in)	84 kg (185 lb)	January 3, 1994 (aged 22)	(Belarus) Dinamo Minsk

=== Canada ===
An 18-man roster was announced on 11 April 2016. Derick Brassard, Mathew Dumba and Corey Perry were added on 28 April 2016. The final roster was announced on 4 May 2016.

Head coach: Bill Peters

No.	Pos.	Name	Height	Weight	Birthdate	Team
4	F	Taylor Hall	1.85 m (6 ft 1 in)	90 kg (200 lb)	November 14, 1991 (aged 24)	(Canada) Edmonton Oilers
5	D	Cody Ceci	1.90 m (6 ft 3 in)	93 kg (205 lb)	December 21, 1993 (aged 22)	(Canada) Ottawa Senators
6	D	Ryan Ellis	1.78 m (5 ft 10 in)	80 kg (180 lb)	January 3, 1991 (aged 25)	(United States) Nashville Predators
7	D	Mike Matheson	1.88 m (6 ft 2 in)	86 kg (190 lb)	February 27, 1994 (aged 22)	(United States) Florida Panthers
8	D	Chris Tanev	1.88 m (6 ft 2 in)	84 kg (185 lb)	December 20, 1989 (aged 26)	(Canada) Vancouver Canucks
9	F	Matt Duchene – A	1.85 m (6 ft 1 in)	90 kg (200 lb)	January 16, 1991 (aged 25)	(United States) Colorado Avalanche
10	D	Ben Hutton	1.88 m (6 ft 2 in)	83 kg (183 lb)	April 20, 1993 (aged 23)	(Canada) Vancouver Canucks
11	F	Brendan Gallagher	1.73 m (5 ft 8 in)	81 kg (179 lb)	May 6, 1992 (aged 24)	(Canada) Montreal Canadiens
14	D	Matt Dumba	1.83 m (6 ft 0 in)	83 kg (183 lb)	July 25, 1994 (aged 21)	(United States) Minnesota Wild
16	F	Max Domi	1.75 m (5 ft 9 in)	84 kg (185 lb)	March 2, 1995 (aged 21)	(United States) Arizona Coyotes
19	F	Derick Brassard	1.84 m (6 ft 0 in)	76 kg (168 lb)	September 20, 1987 (aged 28)	(United States) New York Rangers
23	F	Sam Reinhart	1.85 m (6 ft 1 in)	84 kg (185 lb)	November 6, 1995 (aged 20)	(United States) Buffalo Sabres
24	F	Corey Perry – C	1.90 m (6 ft 3 in)	95 kg (209 lb)	May 16, 1985 (aged 30)	(United States) Anaheim Ducks
27	D	Ryan Murray	1.84 m (6 ft 0 in)	91 kg (201 lb)	September 27, 1993 (aged 22)	(United States) Columbus Blue Jackets
31	G	Calvin Pickard	1.85 m (6 ft 1 in)	92 kg (203 lb)	April 15, 1992 (aged 24)	(United States) Colorado Avalanche
33	G	Cam Talbot	1.90 m (6 ft 3 in)	82 kg (181 lb)	July 5, 1987 (aged 28)	(Canada) Edmonton Oilers
38	F	Boone Jenner	1.86 m (6 ft 1 in)	93 kg (205 lb)	June 15, 1993 (aged 22)	(United States) Columbus Blue Jackets
44	D	Morgan Rielly	1.85 m (6 ft 1 in)	93 kg (205 lb)	March 9, 1994 (aged 22)	(Canada) Toronto Maple Leafs
55	F	Mark Scheifele	1.88 m (6 ft 2 in)	89 kg (196 lb)	March 15, 1993 (aged 23)	(Canada) Winnipeg Jets
61	F	Mark Stone	1.90 m (6 ft 3 in)	93 kg (205 lb)	May 13, 1992 (aged 23)	(Canada) Ottawa Senators
63	F	Brad Marchand	1.76 m (5 ft 9 in)	83 kg (183 lb)	May 11, 1988 (aged 27)	(United States) Boston Bruins
90	F	Ryan O'Reilly – A	1.83 m (6 ft 0 in)	96 kg (212 lb)	February 7, 1991 (aged 25)	(United States) Buffalo Sabres
97	F	Connor McDavid	1.85 m (6 ft 1 in)	85 kg (187 lb)	January 13, 1997 (aged 19)	(Canada) Edmonton Oilers

=== Finland ===
A 28-man roster was announced on 18 April 2016. It was 29 players on 25 April 2016. Aleksander Barkov, Jussi Jokinen, Mikael Granlund, Mikko Koivu, Ville Pokka joined on 26 and 28 April 2016. The final roster was announced on 1 May 2016.

Head coach: Kari Jalonen

No.	Pos.	Name	Height	Weight	Birthdate	Team
1	G	Juuse Saros	1.79 m (5 ft 10 in)	82 kg (181 lb)	April 19, 1995 (aged 21)	(United States) Nashville Predators
2	D	Ville Pokka	1.83 m (6 ft 0 in)	89 kg (196 lb)	June 3, 1994 (aged 21)	(United States) Chicago Blackhawks
4	D	Tommi Kivistö	1.86 m (6 ft 1 in)	89 kg (196 lb)	June 7, 1991 (aged 24)	(Russia) Avtomobilist Yekaterinburg
5	D	Lasse Kukkonen – A	1.83 m (6 ft 0 in)	85 kg (187 lb)	September 18, 1981 (aged 34)	(Finland) Oulun Kärpät
6	D	Topi Jaakola	1.88 m (6 ft 2 in)	90 kg (200 lb)	November 15, 1983 (aged 32)	(Finland) Jokerit
7	D	Esa Lindell	1.91 m (6 ft 3 in)	94 kg (207 lb)	May 23, 1994 (aged 21)	(United States) Dallas Stars
9	F	Mikko Koivu – C	1.89 m (6 ft 2 in)	92 kg (203 lb)	March 12, 1983 (aged 33)	(United States) Minnesota Wild
19	G	Mikko Koskinen	2.00 m (6 ft 7 in)	87 kg (192 lb)	July 18, 1988 (aged 27)	(Russia) SKA Saint Petersburg
20	F	Sebastian Aho	1.81 m (5 ft 11 in)	80 kg (180 lb)	July 26, 1997 (aged 18)	(Finland) Oulun Kärpät
24	F	Jani Lajunen	1.85 m (6 ft 1 in)	75 kg (165 lb)	June 16, 1990 (aged 25)	(Finland) Tappara
28	D	Anssi Salmela	1.85 m (6 ft 1 in)	86 kg (190 lb)	August 13, 1984 (aged 31)	(Sweden) Brynäs IF
29	F	Patrik Laine	1.94 m (6 ft 4 in)	94 kg (207 lb)	April 19, 1998 (aged 18)	(Finland) Tappara
32	G	Niklas Bäckström	1.87 m (6 ft 2 in)	85 kg (187 lb)	February 13, 1978 (aged 38)	(Canada) Calgary Flames
36	F	Jussi Jokinen – A	1.83 m (6 ft 0 in)	87 kg (192 lb)	April 1, 1983 (aged 33)	(United States) Florida Panthers
37	F	Mika Pyörälä	1.82 m (6 ft 0 in)	81 kg (179 lb)	July 13, 1981 (aged 34)	(Finland) Oulun Kärpät
38	D	Juuso Hietanen	1.80 m (5 ft 11 in)	85 kg (187 lb)	June 14, 1985 (aged 30)	(Russia) Dynamo Moscow
40	F	Jarno Koskiranta	1.92 m (6 ft 4 in)	89 kg (196 lb)	December 9, 1986 (aged 29)	(Russia) SKA Saint Petersburg
41	F	Antti Pihlström	1.80 m (5 ft 11 in)	82 kg (181 lb)	October 22, 1984 (aged 31)	(Russia) CSKA Moscow
51	F	Tomi Sallinen	1.84 m (6 ft 0 in)	80 kg (180 lb)	February 11, 1989 (aged 27)	(Sweden) Djurgårdens IF
55	D	Atte Ohtamaa	1.88 m (6 ft 2 in)	92 kg (203 lb)	November 6, 1987 (aged 28)	(Finland) Jokerit
56	F	Teemu Pulkkinen	1.80 m (5 ft 11 in)	90 kg (200 lb)	January 2, 1992 (aged 24)	(United States) Detroit Red Wings
61	F	Aleksander Barkov	1.91 m (6 ft 3 in)	96 kg (212 lb)	September 2, 1995 (aged 20)	(United States) Florida Panthers
64	F	Mikael Granlund	1.79 m (5 ft 10 in)	83 kg (183 lb)	February 26, 1992 (aged 24)	(United States) Minnesota Wild
71	F	Leo Komarov	1.80 m (5 ft 11 in)	90 kg (200 lb)	January 23, 1987 (aged 29)	(Canada) Toronto Maple Leafs
96	F	Mikko Rantanen	1.92 m (6 ft 4 in)	98 kg (216 lb)	October 29, 1996 (aged 19)	(United States) Colorado Avalanche

=== France ===
A 26-man roster was announced on 22 April 2016. It was reduced to 25 on 29 April 2016. The final roster was revealed on 3 May 2016.

Head coach: Dave Henderson

No.	Pos.	Name	Height	Weight	Birthdate	Team
3	D	Jonathan Janil	1.89 m (6 ft 2 in)	93 kg (205 lb)	September 24, 1987 (aged 28)	(France) Boxers de Bordeaux
7	F	Yorick Treille	1.90 m (6 ft 3 in)	97 kg (214 lb)	July 15, 1980 (aged 35)	(France) Dragons de Rouen
9	F	Damien Fleury – A	1.80 m (5 ft 11 in)	84 kg (185 lb)	February 1, 1986 (aged 30)	(Germany) Schwenninger Wild Wings
10	F	Laurent Meunier – C	1.81 m (5 ft 11 in)	82 kg (181 lb)	January 16, 1979 (aged 37)	(Switzerland) HC La Chaux-de-Fonds
12	F	Valentin Claireaux	1.80 m (5 ft 11 in)	90 kg (200 lb)	April 5, 1991 (aged 25)	(Finland) KeuPa HT
18	D	Yohann Auvitu	1.82 m (6 ft 0 in)	90 kg (200 lb)	July 27, 1989 (aged 26)	(Finland) HIFK
20	F	Eliot Berthon	1.71 m (5 ft 7 in)	83 kg (183 lb)	April 27, 1992 (aged 24)	(Switzerland) EHC Biel
25	F	Nicolas Ritz	1.82 m (6 ft 0 in)	87 kg (192 lb)	February 26, 1992 (aged 24)	(Norway) Lillehammer IK
26	D	Benjamin Dieude-Fauvel	1.88 m (6 ft 2 in)	98 kg (216 lb)	August 26, 1986 (aged 29)	(United States) Kalamazoo Wings
27	F	Loïc Lampérier	1.87 m (6 ft 2 in)	90 kg (200 lb)	August 7, 1989 (aged 26)	(France) Dragons de Rouen
28	F	Damien Raux	1.78 m (5 ft 10 in)	83 kg (183 lb)	November 3, 1984 (aged 31)	(France) Dragons de Rouen
33	G	Ronan Quemener	1.86 m (6 ft 1 in)	86 kg (190 lb)	February 13, 1988 (aged 28)	(Sweden) Asplöven HC
39	G	Cristobal Huet	1.83 m (6 ft 0 in)	93 kg (205 lb)	September 3, 1975 (aged 40)	(Switzerland) Lausanne HC
41	F	Pierre-Édouard Bellemare – A	1.82 m (6 ft 0 in)	90 kg (200 lb)	March 6, 1985 (aged 31)	(United States) Philadelphia Flyers
42	F	Julien Desrosiers	1.78 m (5 ft 10 in)	83 kg (183 lb)	October 14, 1980 (aged 35)	(France) Boxers de Bordeaux
46	D	Grégory Beron	1.81 m (5 ft 11 in)	87 kg (192 lb)	July 31, 1989 (aged 26)	(France) Gothiques d'Amiens
49	G	Florian Hardy	1.83 m (6 ft 0 in)	83 kg (183 lb)	February 8, 1985 (aged 31)	(Austria) Dornbirner EC
57	D	Teddy Trabichet	1.79 m (5 ft 10 in)	89 kg (196 lb)	March 10, 1987 (aged 29)	(France) Rapaces de Gap
62	D	Florian Chakiachvili	1.86 m (6 ft 1 in)	87 kg (192 lb)	March 18, 1992 (aged 24)	(France) Dragons de Rouen
72	F	Jordann Perret	1.78 m (5 ft 10 in)	79 kg (174 lb)	October 15, 1994 (aged 21)	(France) Brûleurs de Loups
77	F	Sacha Treille	1.94 m (6 ft 4 in)	95 kg (209 lb)	November 6, 1987 (aged 28)	(France) Dragons de Rouen
80	F	Teddy Da Costa	1.80 m (5 ft 11 in)	85 kg (187 lb)	February 17, 1986 (aged 30)	(Finland) Vaasan Sport
82	F	Charles Bertrand	1.85 m (6 ft 1 in)	92 kg (203 lb)	February 5, 1991 (aged 25)	(Finland) Vaasan Sport
90	D	Maxime Moisand	1.76 m (5 ft 9 in)	82 kg (181 lb)	June 11, 1990 (aged 25)	(France) Dauphins d'Épinal
93	F	Tim Bozon	1.86 m (6 ft 1 in)	88 kg (194 lb)	March 24, 1994 (aged 22)	(Canada) St. John's IceCaps

=== Germany ===
A 28-man roster was announced on 18 April 2016. It was 31 players on 26 April 2016, with Christian Ehrhoff joining later. Korbinian Holzer joined on 1 May 2016.

Head coach: Marco Sturm

No.	Pos.	Name	Height	Weight	Birthdate	Team
1	G	Thomas Greiss	1.88 m (6 ft 2 in)	94 kg (207 lb)	January 29, 1986 (aged 30)	(United States) New York Islanders
2	D	Denis Reul	1.93 m (6 ft 4 in)	110 kg (240 lb)	June 29, 1989 (aged 26)	(Germany) Adler Mannheim
5	D	Korbinian Holzer	1.90 m (6 ft 3 in)	94 kg (207 lb)	February 16, 1988 (aged 28)	(United States) Anaheim Ducks
7	D	Daryl Boyle	1.85 m (6 ft 1 in)	89 kg (196 lb)	February 24, 1987 (aged 29)	(Germany) EHC München
8	F	Tobias Rieder	1.80 m (5 ft 11 in)	82 kg (181 lb)	January 10, 1993 (aged 23)	(United States) Arizona Coyotes
9	F	Jerome Flaake	1.90 m (6 ft 3 in)	92 kg (203 lb)	March 2, 1990 (aged 26)	(Germany) Hamburg Freezers
10	D	Christian Ehrhoff – A	1.88 m (6 ft 2 in)	92 kg (203 lb)	July 6, 1982 (aged 33)	(United States) Chicago Blackhawks
12	F	Brooks Macek	1.81 m (5 ft 11 in)	82 kg (181 lb)	May 15, 1992 (aged 23)	(Germany) Iserlohn Roosters
17	F	Marcus Kink – A	1.86 m (6 ft 1 in)	96 kg (212 lb)	January 13, 1985 (aged 31)	(Germany) Adler Mannheim
29	F	Leon Draisaitl	1.89 m (6 ft 2 in)	96 kg (212 lb)	October 27, 1995 (aged 20)	(Canada) Edmonton Oilers
31	G	Felix Brueckmann	1.81 m (5 ft 11 in)	83 kg (183 lb)	December 16, 1990 (aged 25)	(Germany) EHC Wolfsburg
36	F	Yannic Seidenberg	1.72 m (5 ft 8 in)	82 kg (181 lb)	January 11, 1984 (aged 32)	(Germany) EHC München
37	F	Patrick Reimer	1.79 m (5 ft 10 in)	86 kg (190 lb)	October 16, 1982 (aged 33)	(Germany) Thomas Sabo Ice Tigers
43	F	Gerrit Fauser	1.82 m (6 ft 0 in)	87 kg (192 lb)	July 13, 1989 (aged 26)	(Germany) EHC Wolfsburg
50	F	Patrick Hager	1.78 m (5 ft 10 in)	83 kg (183 lb)	September 8, 1988 (aged 27)	(Germany) Kölner Haie
51	G	Timo Pielmeier	1.83 m (6 ft 0 in)	82 kg (181 lb)	July 7, 1989 (aged 26)	(Germany) ERC Ingolstadt
55	F	Felix Schütz	1.78 m (5 ft 10 in)	84 kg (185 lb)	November 3, 1987 (aged 28)	(Sweden) Rögle BK
57	F	Marcel Goc – C	1.85 m (6 ft 1 in)	92 kg (203 lb)	August 24, 1983 (aged 32)	(Germany) Adler Mannheim
74	F	Dominik Kahun	1.80 m (5 ft 11 in)	80 kg (180 lb)	July 2, 1995 (aged 20)	(Germany) EHC München
81	D	Torsten Ankert	1.88 m (6 ft 2 in)	87 kg (192 lb)	June 22, 1988 (aged 27)	(Germany) Kölner Haie
82	D	Sinan Akdag	1.90 m (6 ft 3 in)	89 kg (196 lb)	November 5, 1989 (aged 26)	(Germany) Adler Mannheim
87	F	Philip Gogulla	1.88 m (6 ft 2 in)	88 kg (194 lb)	July 31, 1987 (aged 28)	(Germany) Kölner Haie
90	D	Constantin Braun	1.91 m (6 ft 3 in)	97 kg (214 lb)	March 11, 1988 (aged 28)	(Germany) Eisbären Berlin
91	D	Moritz Müller	1.87 m (6 ft 2 in)	92 kg (203 lb)	November 19, 1986 (aged 29)	(Germany) Kölner Haie
92	F	Marcel Noebels	1.89 m (6 ft 2 in)	87 kg (192 lb)	March 14, 1992 (aged 24)	(Germany) Eisbären Berlin

=== Hungary ===
A 31-man roster was announced on 20 April 2016.

Head coach: Rich Chernomaz

No.	Pos.	Name	Height	Weight	Birthdate	Team
2	F	Csaba Kovács – A	1.78 m (5 ft 10 in)	83 kg (183 lb)	March 18, 1984 (aged 32)	(Hungary) Fehérvár AV19
5	D	Bence Stipsicz	1.86 m (6 ft 1 in)	85 kg (187 lb)	February 3, 1997 (aged 19)	(Hungary) MAC Budapest
6	D	Bence Szirányi	1.87 m (6 ft 2 in)	78 kg (172 lb)	February 17, 1988 (aged 28)	(Hungary) Fehérvár AV19
9	F	András Benk	1.89 m (6 ft 2 in)	93 kg (205 lb)	September 3, 1987 (aged 28)	(Hungary) Fehérvár AV19
10	F	Gergő Nagy	1.92 m (6 ft 4 in)	96 kg (212 lb)	October 10, 1989 (aged 26)	(Hungary) Fehérvár AV19
13	F	Krisztián Nagy	1.77 m (5 ft 10 in)	84 kg (185 lb)	July 28, 1994 (aged 21)	(Hungary) MAC Budapest
16	F	Dániel Kóger	1.91 m (6 ft 3 in)	82 kg (181 lb)	November 10, 1989 (aged 26)	(Hungary) Fehérvár AV19
20	F	István Sofron	1.89 m (6 ft 2 in)	91 kg (201 lb)	February 24, 1988 (aged 28)	(Austria) EC KAC
21	F	János Vas – A	1.86 m (6 ft 1 in)	89 kg (196 lb)	January 29, 1984 (aged 32)	(Czech Republic) HC Slavia Praha
22	F	Vilmos Galló	1.83 m (6 ft 0 in)	86 kg (190 lb)	July 31, 1996 (aged 19)	(Sweden) Linköpings HC
25	F	Bálint Magosi	1.88 m (6 ft 2 in)	90 kg (200 lb)	August 15, 1989 (aged 26)	(France) Diables Rouges de Briançon
26	D	Kevin Wehrs	1.78 m (5 ft 10 in)	78 kg (172 lb)	April 7, 1988 (aged 28)	(Hungary) Fehérvár AV19
28	F	István Bartalis	1.86 m (6 ft 1 in)	88 kg (194 lb)	September 7, 1990 (aged 25)	(Hungary) Fehérvár AV19
29	G	Zoltán Hetényi	1.88 m (6 ft 2 in)	97 kg (214 lb)	August 22, 1988 (aged 27)	(Hungary) Fehérvár AV19
30	G	Ádám Vay	1.96 m (6 ft 5 in)	104 kg (229 lb)	March 22, 1994 (aged 22)	(Hungary) Debreceni HK
31	G	Miklós Rajna	1.80 m (5 ft 11 in)	85 kg (187 lb)	June 22, 1991 (aged 24)	(Hungary) Fehérvár AV19
36	F	Csanád Erdély	1.88 m (6 ft 2 in)	90 kg (200 lb)	April 5, 1996 (aged 20)	(United States) Sioux Falls Stampede
38	F	Frank Banham	1.85 m (6 ft 1 in)	88 kg (194 lb)	April 14, 1975 (aged 41)	(Hungary) Fehérvár AV19
41	F	Balázs Sebők	1.85 m (6 ft 1 in)	90 kg (200 lb)	December 14, 1994 (aged 21)	(Finland) KalPa
42	D	Márton Vas – C	1.86 m (6 ft 1 in)	96 kg (212 lb)	March 2, 1980 (aged 36)	(Italy) HC Fassa
52	D	Jesse Dudas	1.88 m (6 ft 2 in)	102 kg (225 lb)	March 31, 1988 (aged 28)	(Hungary) Miskolci Jegesmedvék
55	F	Andrew Sarauer	1.94 m (6 ft 4 in)	93 kg (205 lb)	November 17, 1984 (aged 31)	(Hungary) Fehérvár AV19
61	D	István Mestyán	1.90 m (6 ft 3 in)	92 kg (203 lb)	March 31, 1989 (aged 27)	(Hungary) MAC Budapest
65	D	Kalvin Sagert	1.87 m (6 ft 2 in)	107 kg (236 lb)	January 20, 1987 (aged 29)	(Hungary) Miskolci Jegesmedvék
70	D	Zsombor Garát	1.87 m (6 ft 2 in)	90 kg (200 lb)	July 27, 1997 (aged 18)	(Hungary) MAC Budapest

=== Slovakia ===
A 25-man roster was announced on 18 April 2016. It was renewed on 30 April 2016.

Head coach: Zdeno Cíger

No.	Pos.	Name	Height	Weight	Birthdate	Team
2	D	Andrej Sekera – C	1.83 m (6 ft 0 in)	87 kg (192 lb)	June 8, 1986 (aged 29)	(Canada) Edmonton Oilers
8	D	Michal Sersen – A	1.88 m (6 ft 2 in)	92 kg (203 lb)	December 28, 1985 (aged 30)	(Slovakia) Slovan Bratislava
10	F	Martin Réway – A	1.78 m (5 ft 10 in)	79 kg (174 lb)	January 24, 1995 (aged 21)	(Switzerland) HC Fribourg-Gottéron
13	F	Tomáš Jurčo	1.88 m (6 ft 2 in)	85 kg (187 lb)	December 28, 1992 (aged 23)	(United States) Detroit Red Wings
14	D	Andrej Meszároš	1.88 m (6 ft 2 in)	99 kg (218 lb)	October 13, 1985 (aged 30)	(Russia) Sibir Novosibirsk
15	D	Ivan Švarný	1.87 m (6 ft 2 in)	95 kg (209 lb)	October 31, 1984 (aged 31)	(Slovakia) Slovan Bratislava
21	F	Peter Cehlárik	1.88 m (6 ft 2 in)	91 kg (201 lb)	August 2, 1995 (aged 20)	(Sweden) Luleå HF
22	F	Vladimír Dravecký	1.82 m (6 ft 0 in)	90 kg (200 lb)	June 3, 1985 (aged 30)	(Czech Republic) HC Oceláři Třinec
25	F	Marek Viedenský	1.92 m (6 ft 4 in)	88 kg (194 lb)	August 18, 1990 (aged 25)	(Slovakia) Slovan Bratislava
26	D	Juraj Mikuš	1.94 m (6 ft 4 in)	100 kg (220 lb)	November 30, 1988 (aged 27)	(Czech Republic) HC Sparta Praha
28	F	Pavol Skalický	1.95 m (6 ft 5 in)	94 kg (207 lb)	October 9, 1995 (aged 20)	(Slovakia) Slovan Bratislava
30	G	Samuel Baroš	1.82 m (6 ft 0 in)	82 kg (181 lb)	February 10, 1994 (aged 22)	(Slovakia) HKm Zvolen
33	G	Július Hudáček	1.84 m (6 ft 0 in)	84 kg (185 lb)	August 9, 1988 (aged 27)	(Sweden) Örebro HK
41	F	Patrik Lušňák	1.80 m (5 ft 11 in)	85 kg (187 lb)	November 6, 1988 (aged 27)	(Slovakia) Slovan Bratislava
42	G	Branislav Konrád	1.88 m (6 ft 2 in)	85 kg (187 lb)	October 10, 1987 (aged 28)	(Czech Republic) HC Olomouc
51	D	Dominik Graňák	1.82 m (6 ft 0 in)	81 kg (179 lb)	June 11, 1983 (aged 32)	(Sweden) Rögle BK
52	D	Martin Marinčin	1.92 m (6 ft 4 in)	88 kg (194 lb)	February 18, 1992 (aged 24)	(Canada) Toronto Maple Leafs
56	F	Marko Daňo	1.82 m (6 ft 0 in)	90 kg (200 lb)	November 30, 1994 (aged 21)	(Canada) Winnipeg Jets
59	F	Andrej Šťastný	1.91 m (6 ft 3 in)	99 kg (218 lb)	January 24, 1991 (aged 25)	(Slovakia) Slovan Bratislava
61	F	Marek Bartánus	1.90 m (6 ft 3 in)	99 kg (218 lb)	February 13, 1987 (aged 29)	(Slovakia) HC Košice
62	D	Christián Jaroš	1.92 m (6 ft 4 in)	93 kg (205 lb)	April 2, 1996 (aged 20)	(Sweden) Luleå HF
65	F	Tomáš Marcinko	1.93 m (6 ft 4 in)	97 kg (214 lb)	April 11, 1988 (aged 28)	(Czech Republic) HC Pardubice
79	F	Libor Hudáček	1.75 m (5 ft 9 in)	75 kg (165 lb)	September 7, 1990 (aged 25)	(Sweden) Örebro HK
80	F	Tomáš Hrnka	1.96 m (6 ft 5 in)	97 kg (214 lb)	November 11, 1991 (aged 24)	(Slovakia) HC Košice
83	F	Martin Bakoš	1.88 m (6 ft 2 in)	90 kg (200 lb)	April 18, 1990 (aged 26)	(Czech Republic) HC Bílí Tygři Liberec

=== United States ===
A 12-man roster was announced on 12 April 2016. It was built up to 20 on 25 April 2016. The final roster was announced on 3 May 2016.

Head coach: John Hynes

No.	Pos.	Name	Height	Weight	Birthdate	Team
1	G	Keith Kinkaid	1.91 m (6 ft 3 in)	88 kg (194 lb)	July 4, 1989 (aged 26)	(United States) New Jersey Devils
5	D	Connor Murphy – A	1.93 m (6 ft 4 in)	96 kg (212 lb)	March 26, 1993 (aged 23)	(United States) Arizona Coyotes
6	D	Chris Wideman	1.78 m (5 ft 10 in)	82 kg (181 lb)	January 7, 1990 (aged 26)	(Canada) Ottawa Senators
7	F	J. T. Compher	1.80 m (5 ft 11 in)	87 kg (192 lb)	April 8, 1995 (aged 21)	(United States) University of Michigan
10	F	Jordan Schroeder	1.75 m (5 ft 9 in)	80 kg (180 lb)	September 29, 1990 (aged 25)	(United States) Minnesota Wild
11	F	Brock Nelson	1.91 m (6 ft 3 in)	93 kg (205 lb)	October 15, 1991 (aged 24)	(United States) New York Islanders
14	F	Tyler Motte	1.75 m (5 ft 9 in)	86 kg (190 lb)	March 10, 1995 (aged 21)	(United States) University of Michigan
15	D	Noah Hanifin	1.91 m (6 ft 3 in)	93 kg (205 lb)	January 25, 1997 (aged 19)	(United States) Carolina Hurricanes
16	D	Steven Santini	1.88 m (6 ft 2 in)	94 kg (207 lb)	March 7, 1995 (aged 21)	(United States) Boston College
18	F	Kyle Connor	1.85 m (6 ft 1 in)	79 kg (174 lb)	December 9, 1996 (aged 19)	(United States) University of Michigan
19	F	Patrick Maroon	1.91 m (6 ft 3 in)	104 kg (229 lb)	April 23, 1988 (aged 28)	(Canada) Edmonton Oilers
21	F	Dylan Larkin	1.85 m (6 ft 1 in)	86 kg (190 lb)	July 30, 1996 (aged 19)	(United States) Detroit Red Wings
23	F	Matt Hendricks – C	1.83 m (6 ft 0 in)	94 kg (207 lb)	June 17, 1981 (aged 34)	(Canada) Edmonton Oilers
24	F	Hudson Fasching	1.88 m (6 ft 2 in)	98 kg (216 lb)	July 28, 1995 (aged 20)	(United States) Buffalo Sabres
28	F	Miles Wood	1.85 m (6 ft 1 in)	88 kg (194 lb)	September 13, 1995 (aged 20)	(United States) Boston College
29	D	Jake McCabe	1.83 m (6 ft 0 in)	97 kg (214 lb)	October 12, 1993 (aged 22)	(United States) Buffalo Sabres
30	G	Mike Condon	1.88 m (6 ft 2 in)	89 kg (196 lb)	April 27, 1990 (aged 26)	(Canada) Montreal Canadiens
31	G	Thatcher Demko	1.93 m (6 ft 4 in)	95 kg (209 lb)	December 8, 1995 (aged 20)	(United States) Boston College
34	F	Auston Matthews	1.88 m (6 ft 2 in)	88 kg (194 lb)	September 17, 1997 (aged 18)	(Switzerland) ZSC Lions
48	F	Vinnie Hinostroza	1.78 m (5 ft 10 in)	82 kg (181 lb)	April 3, 1994 (aged 22)	(United States) Chicago Blackhawks
55	D	David Warsofsky	1.75 m (5 ft 9 in)	77 kg (170 lb)	May 30, 1990 (aged 25)	(United States) New Jersey Devils
71	F	Nick Foligno – A	1.83 m (6 ft 0 in)	95 kg (209 lb)	October 31, 1987 (aged 28)	(United States) Columbus Blue Jackets
72	F	Frank Vatrano	1.78 m (5 ft 10 in)	98 kg (216 lb)	March 14, 1994 (aged 22)	(United States) Boston Bruins
76	D	Brady Skjei	1.91 m (6 ft 3 in)	93 kg (205 lb)	March 26, 1994 (aged 22)	(United States) New York Rangers
