= Ryan Ellis =

Canadian ice hockey player (born 1991)

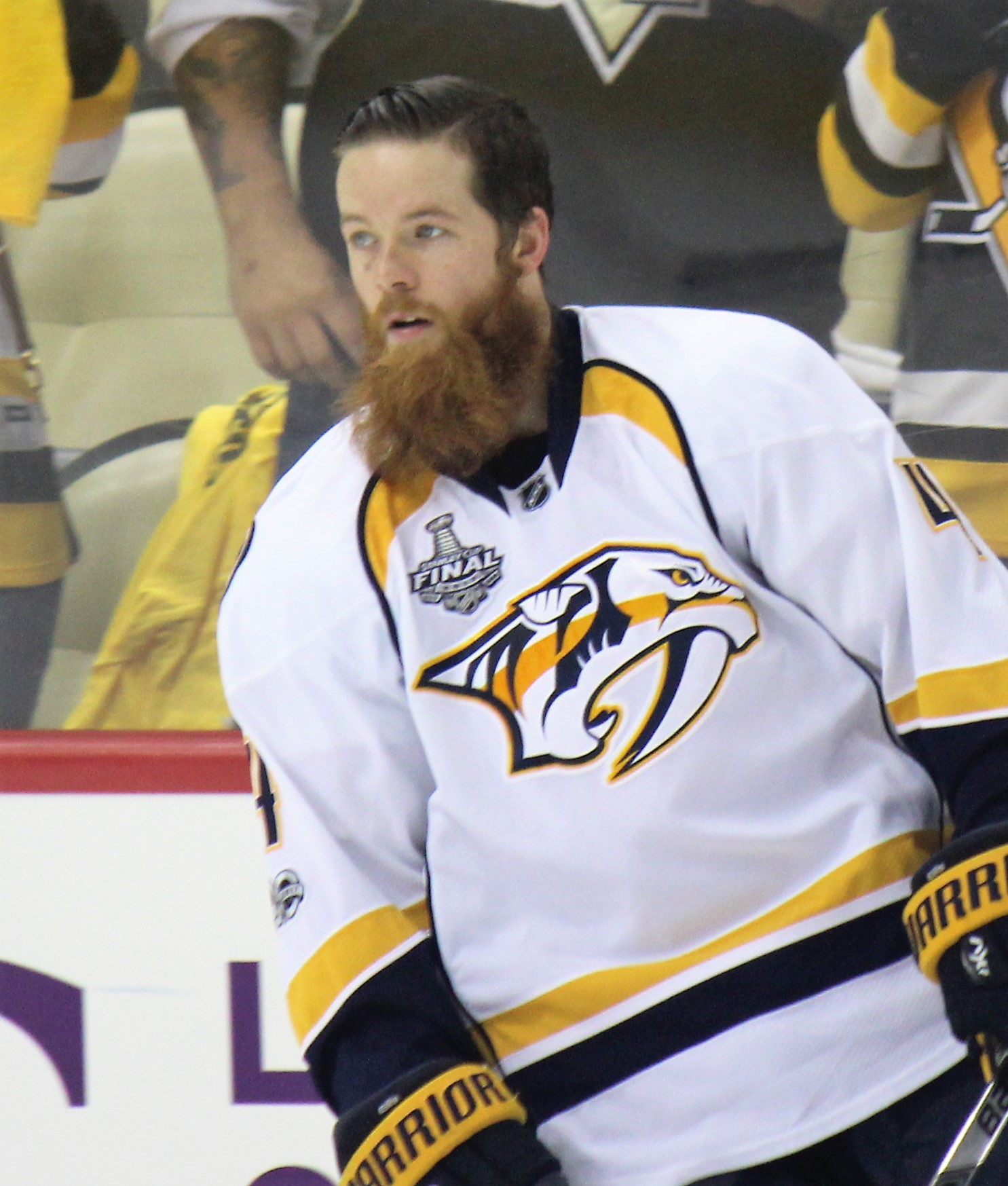
- Ellis with the Nashville Predators in 2017
- Born: January 3, 1991 (age 35) Freelton, Ontario, Canada
- Height: 5 ft 10 in (178 cm)
- Weight: 180 lb (82 kg; 12 st 12 lb)
- Position: Defence
- Shoots: Right
- NHL team Former teams: Chicago Blackhawks; Nashville Predators; Philadelphia Flyers
- National team: Canada
- NHL draft: 11th overall, 2009; Nashville Predators
- Playing career: 2012–present

Ryan James Ellis (born January 3, 1991) is a Canadian professional ice hockey player who is a defenceman under contract with the Chicago Blackhawks of the National Hockey League (NHL). Ellis was drafted eleventh overall by the Nashville Predators in the 2009 NHL entry draft, and played with them for nine seasons.

After his second season in the Ontario Hockey League (OHL), Ellis was selected 11th overall by the Predators in the 2009 NHL entry draft. During his junior career, he was key in guiding the Windsor Spitfires to back-to-back Memorial Cups as Canadian Hockey League (CHL) champions in 2009 and 2010. Individually, he was named to the CHL and OHL All-Rookie Teams in 2008, the First OHL All-Star Team in 2009 and 2011 and the Second OHL All-Star Team in 2010. He was awarded the OHL's Bobby Smith Trophy as the League's scholastic player of the year in 2008, the Max Kaminsky Trophy as the top defenceman in 2009 and 2011 and the Red Tilson Trophy as the most outstanding player in 2011. On a national basis, he was named CHL Defenceman and Player of the Year in 2011. Serving as the Spitfires' team captain in 2010–11, he became the franchise's all-time leading point-scorer among defencemen.

Ellis began his international career with Canada by winning three gold medals in 2008 at the World U17 Hockey Challenge, IIHF World U18 Championship and Ivan Hlinka Memorial Tournament. At the under-20 level, Ellis has made three appearances at the World Junior Championships, winning gold in 2009 and silver in 2010 and 2011. He is the tournament's all-time leading scorer among defencemen and Canada's all-time assists leader. He also won gold with Team Canada at the 2016 World Championships.

== Playing career ==
=== Minor ===
Ellis played minor hockey throughout Ontario, beginning with a club from Belmont, Ontario, at age four. Playing for teams from Mississauga, he won a silver and gold medals at the peewee and bantam provincials, respectively. Joining the Cambridge Hawks at the midget level, he won an Ontario Alliance championship with the club in 2007.

=== Junior ===
Ellis was selected in the second round, 22nd overall, by the Windsor Spitfires in the 2007 Ontario Hockey League (OHL) Draft. Establishing himself as a top defenceman in the League during his rookie campaign, he scored 15 goals and 63 points over 63 games. His points total and +30 plus-minus rating led all OHL rookie defencemen. In the 2008 playoffs, Ellis added five points in five games as the Spitfires were eliminated by the Sarnia Sting. He was named to the Canadian Hockey League (CHL) and OHL All-Rookie Teams, along with Spitfires teammate Taylor Hall. Ellis was further recognized for his academic performance, maintaining an 81 percent average in university preparation courses at St. Anne Catholic High School in Belle River, earning him the League's Bobby Smith Trophy as scholastic player of the year. He received the award over fellow nominee Steven Stamkos of the Sting, who had won it the previous year.

Ellis was named OHL Defenceman of the Month for October 2008 the following season. He earned the distinction twice more over the course of the campaign in February and March 2009. On November 3, he was chosen as OHL Player of the Week, having scored seven points in the previous two games. Ellis his second such distinction on April 20, 2009, registering two goals and five assists in three games. During the season, he represented the OHL in the 2008 ADT Canada-Russia Challenge. He also competed for the Western Conference at the 2009 OHL All-Star Classic and participated in the 2009 CHL Top Prospects Game.

Improving to 22 goals, 67 assists and 89 points in 57 games in 2008–09, Ellis led all OHL defencemen and finished second in team scoring to Taylor Hall. He ranked first in the league in assists, seventh in points and second in plus-minus rating (+52). As a result, Ellis was named to the OHL First All-Star Team and awarded the Max Kaminsky Trophy, beating fellow nominees P. K. Subban and Cameron Gaunce as the League's top defenceman. The distinction made him a finalist for CHL Defenceman of the Year, but he lost to Jonathon Blum of the Western Hockey League (WHL)'s Vancouver Giants. Ellis was additionally voted the smartest player, hardest shot and best offensive defenceman in the Western Conference in an annual poll of OHL coaches. Ellis later cited the smartest player selection as his most rewarding recognition to that date.

Windsor entered the 2009 OHL playoffs as the top-ranked team in the OHL West. Ellis added 31 points in 20 games, tying for third in post-season scoring while helping the Spitfires to a J. Ross Robertson Cup as OHL champions. Earning a berth in the 2009 Memorial Cup, the Spitfires went on to win the national major junior championship over the Kelowna Rockets. Ellis recorded four points in six games to be named to the Tournament All-Star Team.

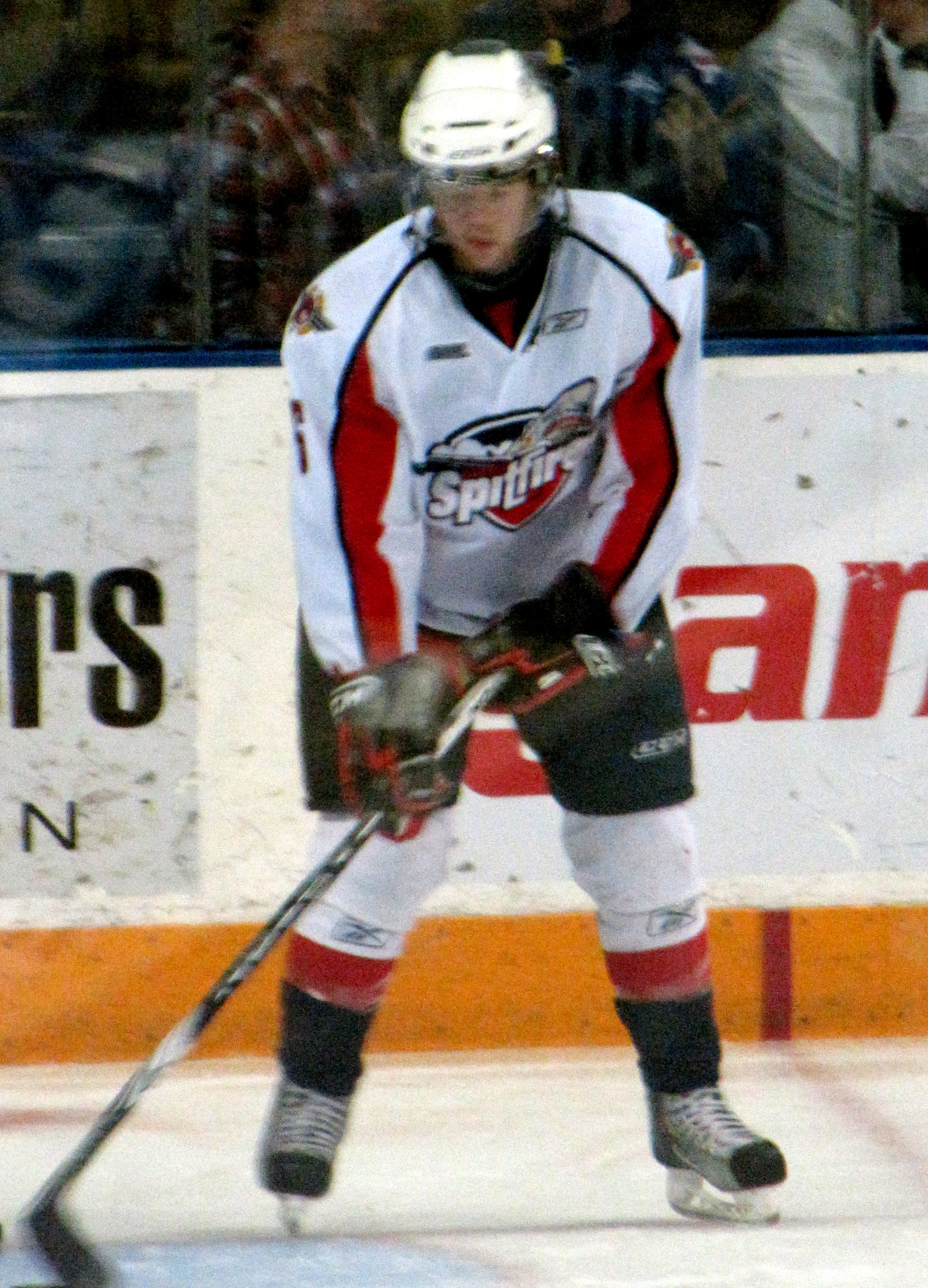
Ellis with the Windsor Spitfires in April 2010

Going into the 2009 NHL entry draft, he was listed by the NHL Central Scouting Bureau as the 16th best prospect (fifth among defencemen) in North America. He was selected in the first round, 11th overall, by the Nashville Predators. Standing at 5 feet and 9 inches (1.75 metres), he was considered small for a defenceman. Addressing this supposed weakness, Hall of Fame defenceman Bobby Orr said of him, "he's not very big, but you'll see...he's a heck of a hockey player." Ellis has publicly discredited any size concerns, alluding to his ability to play physically in spite of it. He has been compared to Detroit Red Wings defenceman Brian Rafalski for his success as a small, offensive defenceman.

Ellis subsequently attended his first NHL training camp with Nashville in September 2009, but was returned to Windsor after suffering a wrist injury. As a result, he missed ten games with the Spitfires, making his season debut in early-November. Struggling offensively upon recovering, he focused on improving his defensive and physical play. Finishing the season with 61 points over 48 games in 2009–10, he ranked fourth among League defencemen in point-scoring and was named to the OHL Second All-Star Team. Windsor defended both their OHL and Memorial Cup championships in the ensuing post-season. Ellis scored 33 points over 19 games in the OHL playoffs, tying with Jeff Skinner for second in OHL scoring, behind Taylor Hall. Windsor beat the Barrie Colts in the OHL Finals before defeating the Brandon Wheat Kings 9–1 in the Memorial Cup Final. Ellis recorded three assists in the national championship game.

Attending his second Predators training camp, he was again returned to junior for the 2010–11 season. Upon his return to Windsor, he was named team captain. After recording five goals and 17 points in November 2010, he was named OHL Defenceman of the Month. During the month, he surpassed Joel Quenneville as the Spitfires' all-time leading scorer among defencemen. He scored the game-winning goal in overtime against the London Knights on November 10 for his record-setting 230th career point with Windsor. Ellis was honoured in a pre-game ceremony on November 26 for the feat; the game that night against the Oshawa Generals was billed as "Ryan Ellis Night." Also in November, Ellis served as captain for Team OHL in the 2010 Subway Super Series against Russia. Several months later, he recorded his 300th career OHL point on February 25, 2011. Registering three assists in a 4–2 win against the Sault Ste. Marie Greyhounds, he became the third defenceman in OHL history to reach the mark, following Denis Potvin (330 points, 1968–73) and Rick Corriveau (329 points, 1987–92). He completed the season with 313 points all-time. His single-season total of 100 points (24 goals and 76 assists) established a career-high while leading all OHL defencemen by a 21-point margin. It was the first time in over 17 years that an OHL defenceman scored 100 points in a season. Among all OHL skaters, he ranked fifth overall. After winning his second Max Kaminsky Trophy and first Red Tilson Trophy as the OHL's most outstanding defenceman and player, respectively, he was further distinguished as CHL Defenceman and Player of the Year. Ellis beat out Simon Després and Stefan Elliott for the former recognition, while being voted over Sean Couturier and Darcy Kuemper for the latter. It was the first time a player won both awards since Bryan Fogarty did so 22 years prior.

=== Professional ===
==== Nashville Predators organization ====
Once the 2010–11 OHL season concluded, Ellis turned professional and joined the Predators' American Hockey League (AHL) affiliate, the Milwaukee Admirals, for the remainder of their season. Upon joining the Admirals, he immediately made an impact by tallying his first assist 10 minutes and 30 seconds into Game 1 of the West Division Finals. He later tallied his first professional goal in his sixth playoff game to stave off elimination and force a Game 7.

Prior to the start of the 2011–12 season, Ellis participated in the 2011 Florida Rookie Tournament where he led all team defensemen with two points. He played in five of Nashville's 2011 preseason contests, posting one assist and a +3 rating, before being assigned to the AHL for the 2011–12 season. Ellis immediately continued his production from the playoffs and tallied two assists in his first regular season AHL game. By mid-November, Ellis had accumulated three goals and five assists for eight points through 12 games. He also maintained a five game point streak from November 13 to 26. He improved to four goals and eight assists for 15 points by December 9. Later that month, he was tied for first among rookie defencemen and ninth among all AHL defencemen with 17 points through 26 games. As a result of his AHL success, Ellis was recalled to the NHL level on December 26. He played 13:37 minutes of ice time in his debut that night and was minus-one with two shots on goal against the Detroit Red Wings. His play also earned him a selection to the 2012 AHL All-Star Game although he was unable to participate as he was still with the Predators. In his fifth career NHL game on January 7, Ellis recorded his first NHL point on Patric Hornqvist’s second period power-play goal. Later that game, he tallied his first career NHL goal in the third period to help the Predators defeat the Carolina Hurricanes. Through his first 12 games at the NHL level, Ellis accumulated two goals and four assists for six points and a plus-4 rating. As he began earning the trust of head coach Barry Trotz, Ellis also saw time on the second power-play unit with Roman Josi. After being named a healthy scratch for one game, Ellis returned to the Predators lineup on February 15 and quickly tallied a goal and an assist for his third multi-point game of the season. He played in 22 games with the Predators, tallying three goals and six assists, before being re-assigned to the AHL on February 24. He posted one assist over three games before being recalled to the NHL level on February 27. As the Predators qualified for the 2012 Stanley Cup playoffs, Ellis made his postseason debut in Game 3 of the Western Conference Quarterfinals against the Detroit Red Wings. Although he remained pointless over the three games he played, the Predators beat the Red Wings and met with the Chicago Blackhawks.

After participating in the Predators 2012 training camp, Ellis was re-assigned to their AHL affiliate for the 2012–13 season. However, he was unable to play until November 23, 2012, due to a broken wrist. He quickly accumulated two goals and seven assists for nine points through 20 games before the 2012–13 NHL lockout concluded. Once the lockout ended, Ellis participated in the Predators training camp and was named to their opening night roster for the shortened 2012–13 season. Ellis immediately tallied two points through his first two games but struggled to produce points as the season continued. After only accumulating two goals and four assists over 31 games, Ellis was re-assigned to the Admirals on March 25. He finished the NHL season with two goals and six points in 32 games.

Prior to the start of the 2013–14 season, the Predators hired Phil Housley as their assistant coach in part to help Ellis and the other young defencemen improve their game. During the Predators 2013 training camp, head coach Barry Trotz stated that although he felt Ellis was pressing too hard in the previous season, he saw the defenseman was more determined entering the 2013–14 season. Through his first four preseason games, Ellis accumulated one assist and an even plus-minus rating. Despite his slow start, Ellis was named to the Predator's opening night roster for the first time in his NHL career. Through the first 10 games of the season, Ellis averaged 10 minutes per game and saw his ice time increase once defencemen Roman Josi suffered an injury in late October. By December, Ellis had accumulated one goal and nine points through 34 games and spent time on the Predators' second power-play unit. His scoring began to pick up in January and the following months saw him hit numerous personal milestones. His 42-game scoring drought came to an end on January 15 after he tallied a goal and an assist in the third period to lead the Predators to a 4–2 win over the Calgary Flames. By the end of January, Ellis had maintained a plus-4 rating while accumulating a career-best 13 assists and 16 points. Although he often played as a bottom defenceman, Ellis averaged 14:27 per game in time on ice while also manning the second power-play unit with rookie Seth Jones. After the Predators acquired Michael Del Zotto, Ellis began playing with Mattias Ekholm on the third pairing while Jones played with Del Zotto on the second. Prior to Trotz's firing, Ellis began logging close to 20 minutes a night in March and April and his minutes continued to grow under new head coach Peter Laviolette. He finished the 2013–14 season with six goals and 21 assists through 80 games, although he remained unsigned as a restricted free agent. As the Predators failed to qualify for the 2014 Stanley Cup playoffs, Ellis was named to Team Canada's senior team for the 2014 IIHF World Championship.

Following the 2014 IIHF World Championship, Ellis and the Predators had yet to come to a contract agreement. As such, Ellis began skating with his junior team, the Windsor Spitfires, to stay in shape. The organization eventually signed Ellis to a five-year, $12.5 million contract on September 26. Despite missing time at training camp, Ellis began the 2014–15 season strong. On October 22, he recorded a career-high three points and scored the game-winning shootout goal to lead the Predators over the Arizona Coyotes.

On August 14, 2018, the Predators re-signed Ellis to an eight-year, $50 million dollar contract extension with a $6.25 million dollar salary starting in the 2019–20 season.

==== Philadelphia Flyers ====
On July 17, 2021, Ellis was traded to the Philadelphia Flyers in exchange for Philippe Myers and Nolan Patrick, who was then traded to the Vegas Golden Knights for forward Cody Glass. Ellis played four games until November 13 after he suffered a "multilayered" issue involving the "complex of the whole pelvic region." Although he was expected to be ready for the 2022–23 season, Flyers general manager Chuck Fletcher described the injury as possibly career-ending.

==== Post-injury years ====
In October 2025, Ellis' contract was traded to the San Jose Sharks alongside a conditional sixth-round pick in 2026 in exchange for Carl Grundstrom and Artem Guryev. Several months later, on January 8, 2026, his contract was traded to the Chicago Blackhawks, alongside Jake Furlong and a fourth-round pick in 2028, in exchange for Nolan Allan, Laurent Brossoit, and a seventh-round pick in 2028.

== International play ==
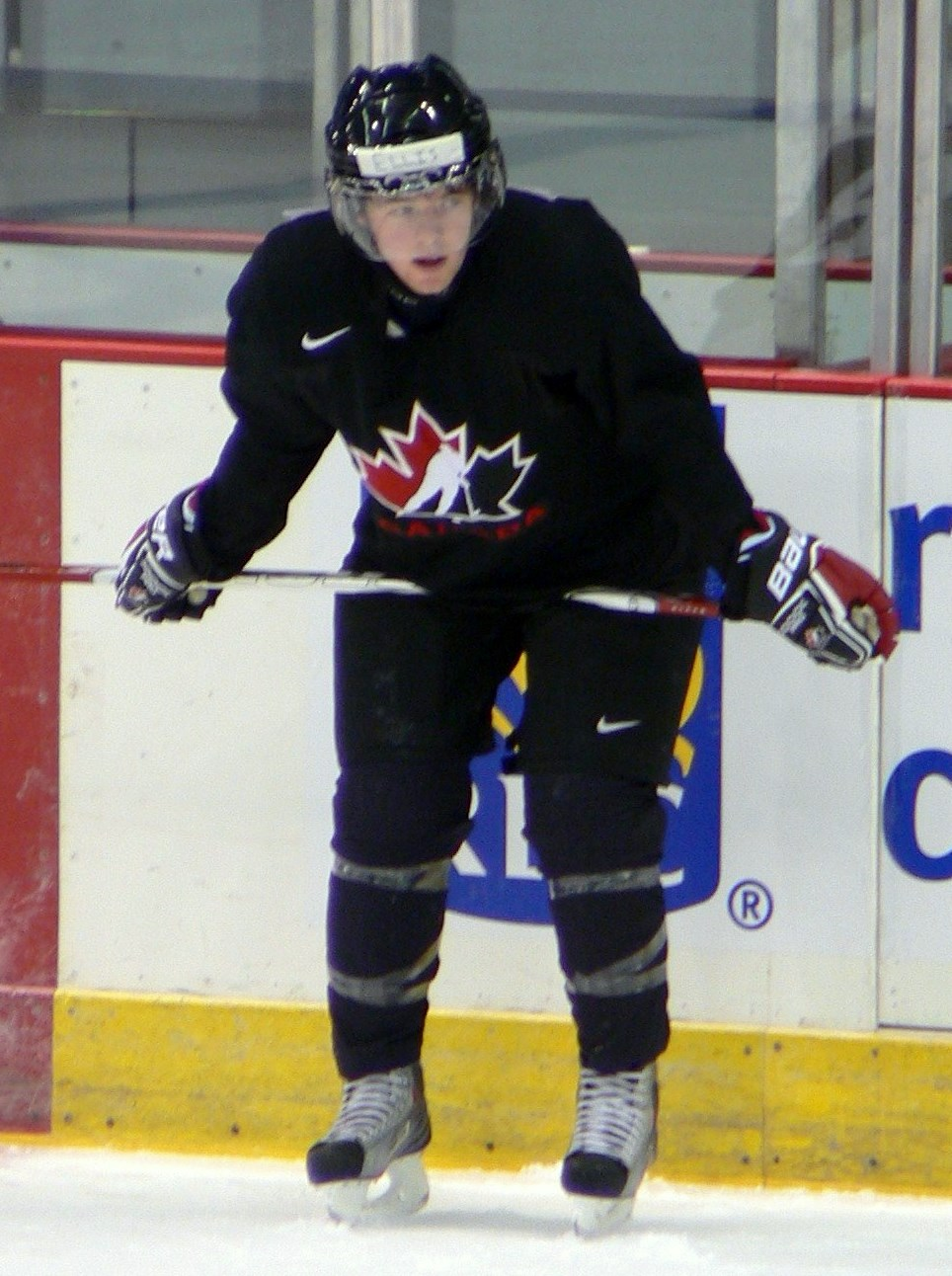
- Ellis at the national junior team's December 2009 selection camp

Medal record

Men's ice hockey

Representing Canada

World Championships
| Gold medal – first place | 2016 Russia | |

World Junior Championships
| Gold medal – first place | 2009 Canada | |
| Silver medal – second place | 2010 Canada | |
| Silver medal – second place | 2011 United States | |

Ivan Hlinka Memorial Tournament
| Gold medal – first place | 2008 Czech Republic/Slovakia | |

IIHF World U18 Championship
| Gold medal – first place | 2008 Russia | |

Representing Canada Ontario

World U-17 Hockey Challenge
| Gold medal – first place | 2008 Canada | |

Ellis made his debut with Hockey Canada at the 2008 World U17 Hockey Challenge, representing Ontario, the tournament's host province. He scored his first international goal against Team Pacific on December 29, 2007, a game in which he was also chosen as Ontario's best player. Team Ontario won eight straight games as they won the tournament. With nine points in eight games, Ellis was the tournament's leading defenceman and was named to the All-Star Team, along with Ontario teammate Matt Duchene.

Later that year, Ellis was named to Canada's team for the 2008 IIHF World U18 Championships in Russia. Leading his team in shots on goal, he helped Canada to a gold medal, defeating Russia 8–0 in the final. He recorded a goal and an assist in the championship victory. Finishing with three goals and seven points, he was the tournament's leading defenceman. Four months later, he re-joined the national under-18 team for the 2008 Ivan Hlinka Memorial Tournament, held in Slovakia and the Czech Republic. Ellis led all team defencemen in scoring with five points (a goal and four assists), helping Canada go undefeated in four games. They defeated Russia 6–3 in the final to capture the gold medal.

Moving on to the Canada's under-20 team, he made his first of three World Junior Championship appearances in 2009. Named to the team at 17 years old, he was one of three draft-eligible players on the club with John Tavares and Evander Kane. Head Coach Pat Quinn had coached Ellis previously at the World U18 Championships. He selected Ellis to the team as the eighth defencemen, instead of choosing a traditional 13th forward, because of his abilities on the power play. In the semifinal against Russia, Ellis was instrumental in tying the game with five seconds remaining in regulation. Twice, he preventing the puck from being cleared out of the offensive zone, which allowed a play to develop that resulted in Jordan Eberle's game-tying goal. Canada beat Russia in a shootout before defeating Sweden in the final to win gold. Ellis scored seven points over six games to finish fourth among tournament defencemen in scoring. It also set a Canadian record for most points by a 17-year-old defenceman.

The following year, Ellis returned for the 2010 World Junior Championships in Saskatchewan. Canada went undefeated in the tournament until the gold medal game, where they lost to the United States in overtime. The defeat ended Canada's five-year gold medal streak at the World Juniors and marked the first time Ellis competed in an international competition without winning gold. He finished with eight points over six games, ranking second among tournament defencemen behind teammate Alex Pietrangelo.

As a two-time veteran of Canada's junior team, Ellis opted not to attend their annual summer evaluation camp. In December 2010, he was named to the squad as one of four returning players for the 2011 World Junior Championships, held in Buffalo, New York. Ellis became the seventh player in Canadian history to play three times in the tournament. (Note: The previous six were Jay Bouwmeester, Jason Spezza, Jason Botterill, Martin Lapointe, Eric Lindros and Trevor Kidd.) He was later chosen as team captain. Ellis began the tournament tied with Pietrangelo as the country's all-time top-scoring defenceman at the World Juniors. By scoring a goal in the opening game against Russia, a 6–3 win for Canada, he broke the tie to take the all-time scoring lead among Canadian defencemen. Later in the tournament, Ellis recorded three assists in a game against Norway, making him the World Juniors' all-time leading scorer among defencemen, passing Finnish defenceman Reijo Ruotsalainen's mark of 21 points. In the quarterfinal, he assisted on a goal against Switzerland to break Eric Lindros's 19-assist record as Canada's all-time leader at the tournament. Playing Russia in the gold medal game, Ellis scored the opening goal in a 5–3 losing effort, earning silver for the second consecutive year. Finishing the tournament with three goals and ten points to lead all blueliners, he earned Best Defenceman and All-Star Team honours. He was additionally voted by tournament coaches as one of Canada's best three players. With 25 points over three years at the tournament, he tied Jordan Eberle as Canada's second-best scorer of all-time, behind Lindros' 31 points.

Ellis was a late addition to Team Canada at the 2016 IIHF World Championship, joining the team in mid-tournament after Nashville was knocked out of the NHL playoffs; the team went on to win the gold medal.

== Playing style ==
Ellis is an offensive defenceman. A fast skater and skilled stickhandler, he is capable of manoeuvring the puck up the ice from the defensive zone. Known as a power play specialist, he often "quarterbacks" from the blueline—controlling puck distribution between teammates in the offensive zone—and possesses a hard and accurate shot. He is also a physical player, though he is undersized as a defenceman at 5 feet and 10 inches (1.78 metres). He is able to compensate for his lack of overpowering strength with good defensive positioning and active stick-checking.

== Personal life ==
Ellis was born in Freelton, Ontario, to parents Jim and Mary Lou. He has one sister. He went to Balaclava Public School followed by Waterdown High School. Moving away from home for his junior career, he attended St. Anne High School. In February 2010, Ellis was selected as his hometown Hamilton/Burlington area's 2009 Golden Horseshoe Athlete of the Year, beating out college quarterback Danny Brannagan and marathon runner Reid Coolsaet.

== Career statistics ==
=== Regular season and playoffs ===
| | | | Regular season | | | | | Playoffs |
| Season | Team | League | GP | G | A | Pts | PIM | GP | G | A | Pts | PIM |
|---|---|---|---|---|---|---|---|---|---|---|---|---|
| 2006–07 | Cambridge WinterHawks AAA | AH U16 | 75 | 37 | 56 | 93 | 151 | — | — | — | — | — |
| 2007–08 | Windsor Spitfires | OHL | 63 | 15 | 48 | 63 | 51 | 5 | 2 | 3 | 5 | 2 |
| 2008–09 | Windsor Spitfires | OHL | 57 | 22 | 67 | 89 | 57 | 20 | 8 | 23 | 31 | 20 |
| 2009–10 | Windsor Spitfires | OHL | 48 | 12 | 49 | 61 | 38 | 19 | 3 | 30 | 33 | 14 |
| 2010–11 | Windsor Spitfires | OHL | 58 | 24 | 77 | 101 | 61 | 18 | 6 | 13 | 19 | 12 |
| 2010–11 | Milwaukee Admirals | AHL | — | — | — | — | — | 7 | 1 | 1 | 2 | 2 |
| 2011–12 | Milwaukee Admirals | AHL | 29 | 4 | 14 | 18 | 8 | — | — | — | — | — |
| 2011–12 | Nashville Predators | NHL | 32 | 3 | 8 | 11 | 4 | 3 | 0 | 0 | 0 | 0 |
| 2012–13 | Milwaukee Admirals | AHL | 32 | 5 | 9 | 14 | 18 | 4 | 0 | 0 | 0 | 0 |
| 2012–13 | Nashville Predators | NHL | 32 | 2 | 4 | 6 | 15 | — | — | — | — | — |
| 2013–14 | Nashville Predators | NHL | 80 | 6 | 21 | 27 | 24 | — | — | — | — | — |
| 2014–15 | Nashville Predators | NHL | 58 | 9 | 18 | 27 | 27 | 6 | 0 | 3 | 3 | 2 |
| 2015–16 | Nashville Predators | NHL | 79 | 10 | 22 | 32 | 35 | 14 | 0 | 6 | 6 | 4 |
| 2016–17 | Nashville Predators | NHL | 71 | 16 | 22 | 38 | 29 | 22 | 5 | 8 | 13 | 12 |
| 2017–18 | Nashville Predators | NHL | 44 | 9 | 23 | 32 | 6 | 13 | 0 | 5 | 5 | 8 |
| 2018–19 | Nashville Predators | NHL | 82 | 7 | 34 | 41 | 20 | 6 | 0 | 3 | 3 | 0 |
| 2019–20 | Nashville Predators | NHL | 49 | 8 | 30 | 38 | 19 | 4 | 1 | 2 | 3 | 2 |
| 2020–21 | Nashville Predators | NHL | 35 | 5 | 13 | 18 | 10 | 6 | 1 | 4 | 5 | 2 |
| 2021–22 | Philadelphia Flyers | NHL | 4 | 1 | 4 | 5 | 0 | — | — | — | — | — |
| NHL totals | | | 566 | 76 | 199 | 275 | 189 | 74 | 7 | 31 | 38 | 30 |

=== International ===
| Year | Team | Event | Result | GP | G | A | Pts | PIM |
|---|---|---|---|---|---|---|---|---|
| 2008 | Canada Ontario | U17 | 1st place, gold medalist(s) | 6 | 1 | 8 | 9 | 8 |
| 2008 | Canada | WJC18 | 1st place, gold medalist(s) | 7 | 3 | 4 | 7 | 0 |
| 2009 | Canada | WJC | 1st place, gold medalist(s) | 6 | 1 | 6 | 7 | 0 |
| 2010 | Canada | WJC | 2nd place, silver medalist(s) | 6 | 1 | 7 | 8 | 2 |
| 2011 | Canada | WJC | 2nd place, silver medalist(s) | 7 | 3 | 7 | 10 | 10 |
| 2014 | Canada | WC | 5th | 8 | 1 | 4 | 5 | 0 |
| 2016 | Canada | WC | 1st place, gold medalist(s) | 5 | 1 | 1 | 2 | 0 |
| Junior totals | | | | 32 | 9 | 32 | 41 | 20 |
| Senior totals | | | | 13 | 2 | 5 | 7 | 0 |

== Awards and honours ==
=== Junior ===
| Award | Year | Ref |
|---|---|---|
| CHL Defenceman of the Year | 2011 | |
| CHL Player of the Year | 2011 | |
| OHL All-Rookie Team | 2008 | |
| CHL All-Rookie Team | 2008 | |
| Bobby Smith Trophy (OHL Scholastic Player of the Year) | 2008 | |
| OHL First All-Star Team | 2009 | |
| Max Kaminsky Trophy (OHL Defenceman of the Year) | 2009, 2011 | |
| Memorial Cup All-Star Team | 2009 | |
| Mickey Renaud Captain's Trophy | 2011 | |
| OHL First All-Star Team | 2011 | |
| OHL Second All-Star Team | 2010 | |
| OHL Defenceman of the Month | October 2008, February 2009, March 2009 and November 2010 | |
| OHL Player of the Week | November 4, 2008, and April 20, 2009 | |
| Red Tilson Trophy | 2011 | |

=== International ===
| Award | Year | Ref |
|---|---|---|
| World U17 Tournament All-Star Team | 2008 | |
| World Junior Championship All-Star Team | 2011 | |
| World Junior Championships Best Defenceman | 2011 | |
| WJC All-Decade Team | 2019 | |

== Records ==
- Windsor Spitfires' all-time leading point-scorer, defencemen (surpassed Joel Quenneville, 229 points);
- World Junior Championships' all-time leading point-scorer, defencemen – 25 (surpassed Reijo Ruotsalainen, 21 points);
- Canadian national junior team's all-time leading assist-scorer – 20 (surpassed Eric Lindros, 19 assists).

== Notes ==
Awards and achievements
| Preceded by Alex Pietrangelo | World Junior Best Defenceman; 2011 | Succeeded by Brandon Gormley |
| Preceded by Drew Doughty | Max Kaminsky Trophy; 2009 | Succeeded by Jake Muzzin |
| Preceded by Jake Muzzin | Max Kaminsky Trophy; 2011 | Succeeded by Incumbent |
| Preceded by Steven Stamkos | Bobby Smith Trophy; 2008 | Succeeded by Matt Duchene |
| Preceded by Chet Pickard | Nashville Predators first-round draft pick 2009 | Succeeded by Austin Watson |
Sporting positions
| Preceded by Patrice Cormier | Canadian national junior team captain 2011 | Succeeded by Jaden Schwartz |
