= István Mestyán =

Hungarian ice hockey player (born 1989)

- Born: 31 March 1989 (age 36); Dunaújváros, Hungary
- Height: 189 cm (6 ft 2 in)
- Weight: 91 kg (201 lb; 14 st 5 lb)
- Position: Defenceman
- Catches: Left
- Erste Liga team Former teams: DEAC; Dunaújvárosi Acélbikák; Ferencvárosi TC; MAC Budapest
- National team: Hungary
- Playing career: 2006–present

István Mestyán; born 31 March 1989 in Dunaújváros) is a Hungarian professional ice hockey defenceman who plays for DEAC in the Erste Liga.
