= Freelton, Ontario =

- Rural community
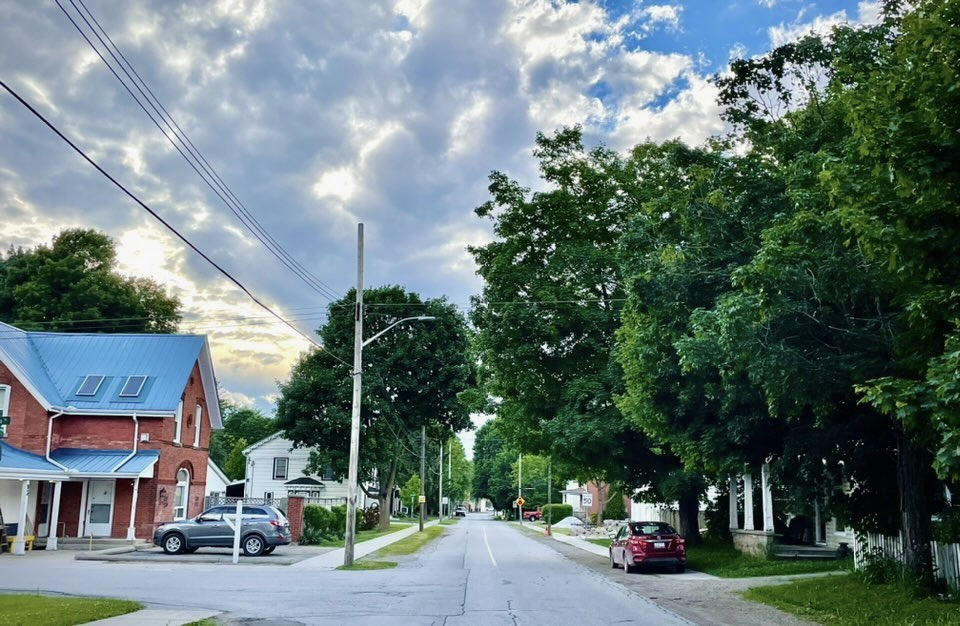
- Looking north up Freelton Road (once King's Highway 6)

- Location within Southern Ontario
- Coordinates: 43°24′01″N 80°02′21″W
- Country: Canada
- Province: Ontario
- Municipality: Hamilton
- District: Flamborough
- Founded: 1856
- Named for: Patrick Freel

Government
  - Mayor: Andrea Horwath

Population
  - Estimate (2018): 2,500

Freelton is a rural community in the district of Flamborough, within the City of Hamilton, Ontario, Canada, formerly a village in the Township of West Flamborough.

Its name is derived from Patrick Freel, an Irish immigrant who ran a tavern and hotel at the intersection of King's Highway 6 (now Freelton Road) and Brock Road (then a toll route to the Town of Dundas). The Freel family grave can be viewed at the Our Lady of Mount Carmel Catholic Church (1877).

In recent years, it has become a popular residential community for commuters to nearby Cambridge, Guelph, Hamilton and the GTA due to its intersection of Highway 6 (which now bypasses the town along its eastern side) with Regional Road 97, and its proximity to Highway 401 to the north. This equidistant centrality was the catalyst for the community’s inception and growth.

== Character ==
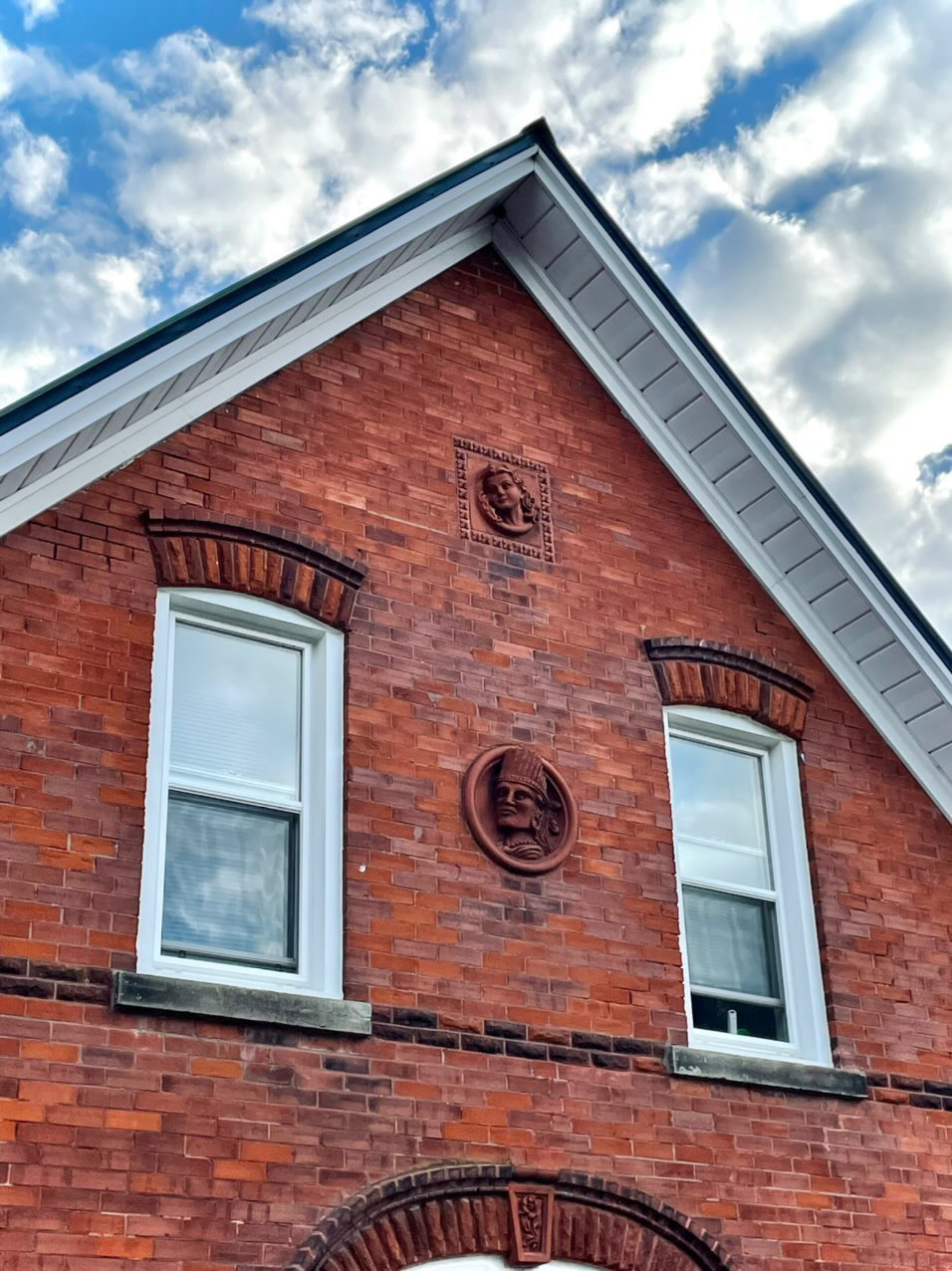
The effigy of indigenous military leader Joseph Brant on a house in Freelton.

Houses within the historical boundary of the community (100 acres of land initially purchased by Freel with streets named after members of his family) showcase the ornate decoration of late 19th century Canadian residential architecture, a prime example being the moulded figure of indigenous military leader Joseph Brant and his wife on one home at the intersection of William Street and Freelton Road. The origins and intent of this effigy are unknown.

Many houses within the suburban periphery of this historical boundary are located on oversized country lots and are home to many middle to upper-middle-class families. The community is often used as a set for film and TV productions.

The community’s most significant commercial area is characterized by a selection of businesses and retailers which have occupied a collection of repurposed industrial chicken barns. These include Rescued & Restored (a charitable thrift store) and the Freelton Antique Mall.

== Geography ==
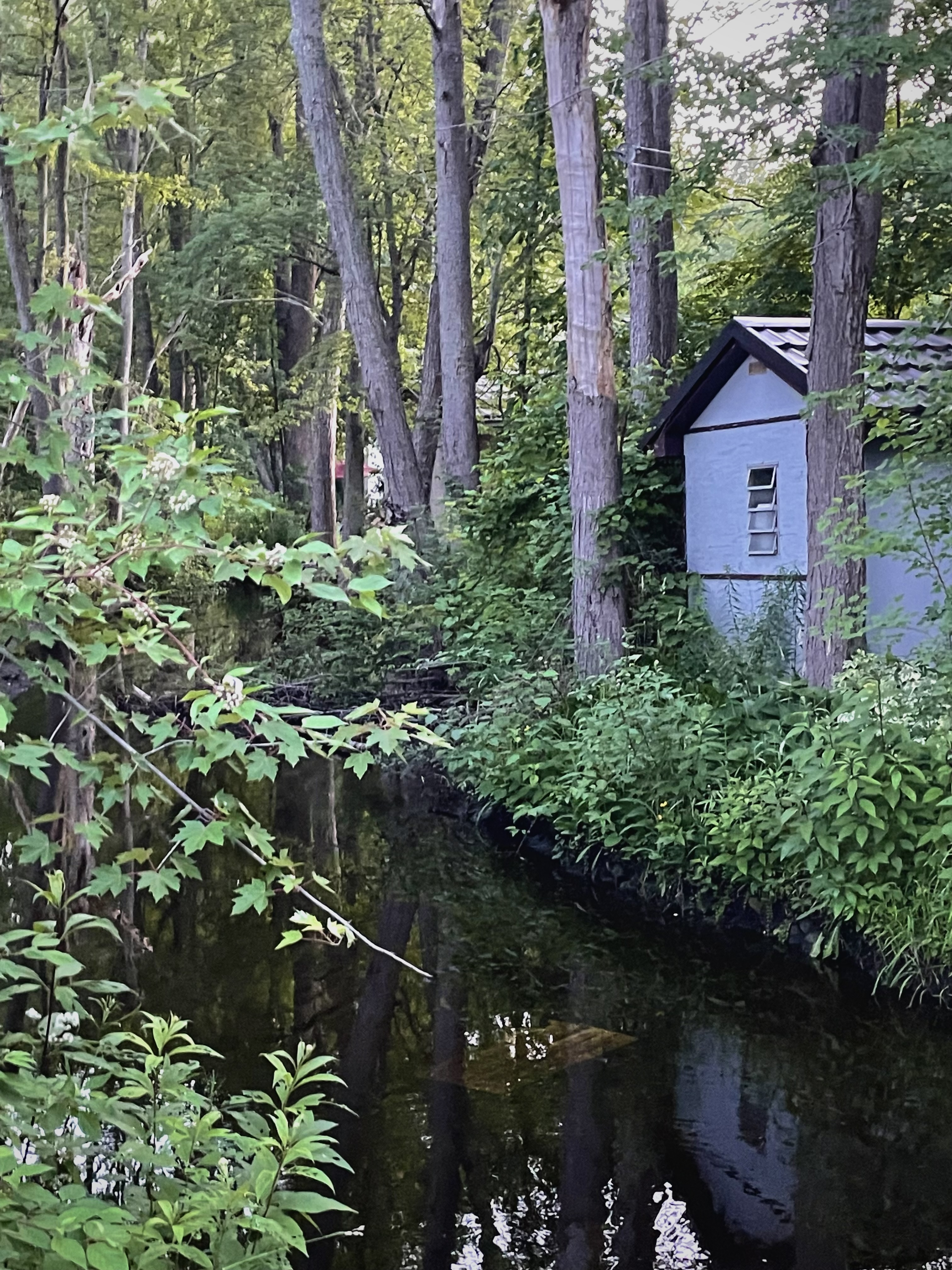
A shed overlooks Bronte Creek in Freelton.

Bronte Creek emerges from various springs in the nearby village of Morriston and throughout the southern end of Puslinch Township, which rests upon a significant aquifer system. The creek ambles its way along the eastern edge of the community into neighbouring Carlisle.

Portions of land west of Freelton are dominated by the low-lying Beverly Swamp, situated between steep glacial drumlins. The surrounding countryside is predominantly agricultural, with many portions of undeveloped woodland and conservation land within the borders of the Greenbelt.

== Attractions ==
Freelton Public Library
The Hamilton Public Library’s Freelton branch made national headlines when it became the first library in the country to offer fully automated after-hours access to its facilities, allowing patrons to scan their library card for entry to the building during periods when staff were not present. Originally a pilot program, it set the precedent for the level of accessibility that rural North American library branches can provide their communities, a concept that is now being replicated across the continent.

Rescued and Restored
A lovely little second-hand store frequented by members of the Freelton community.

== Gallery ==
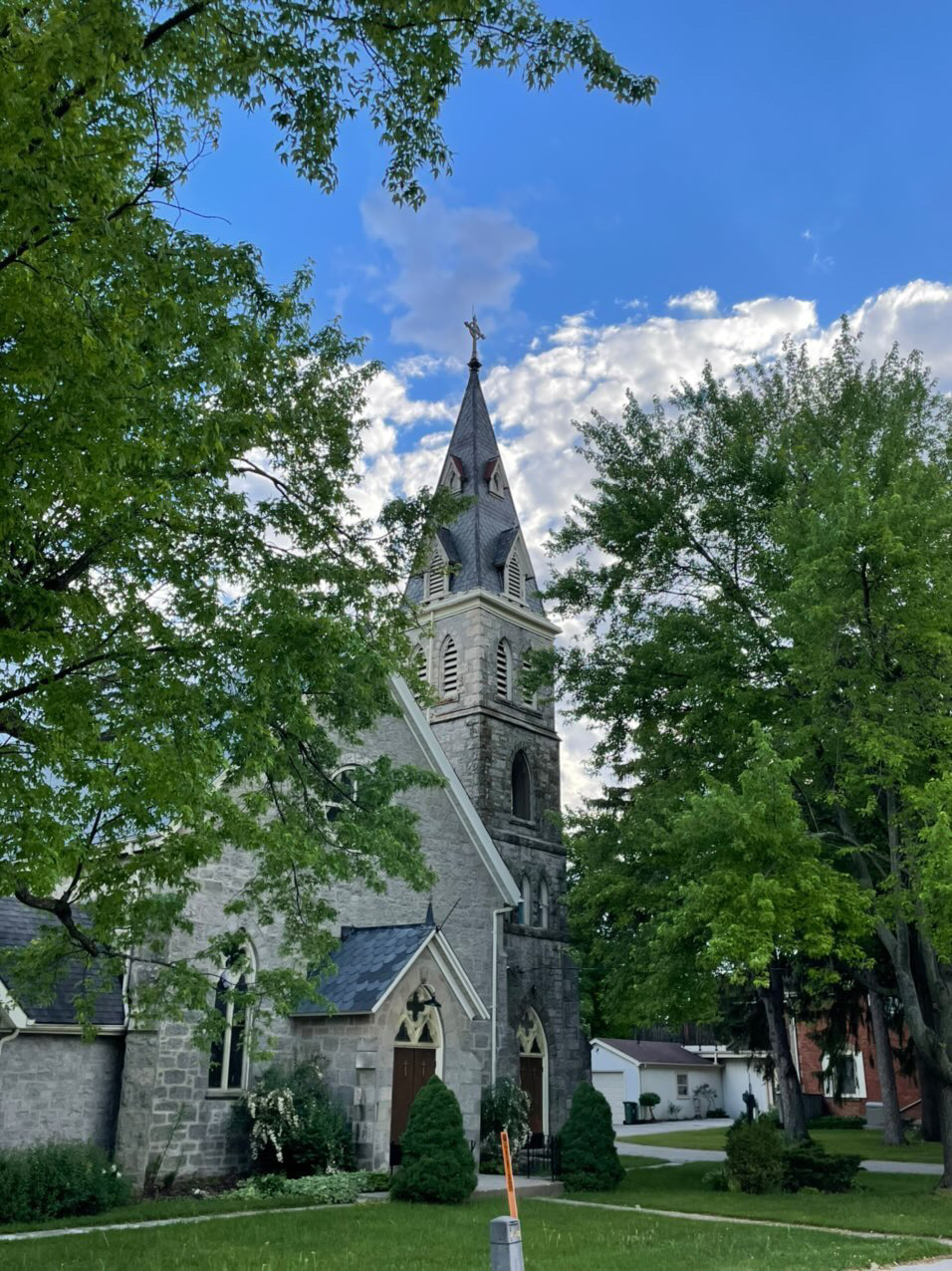
Our Lady of Mount Carmel Catholic Church in Freelton.

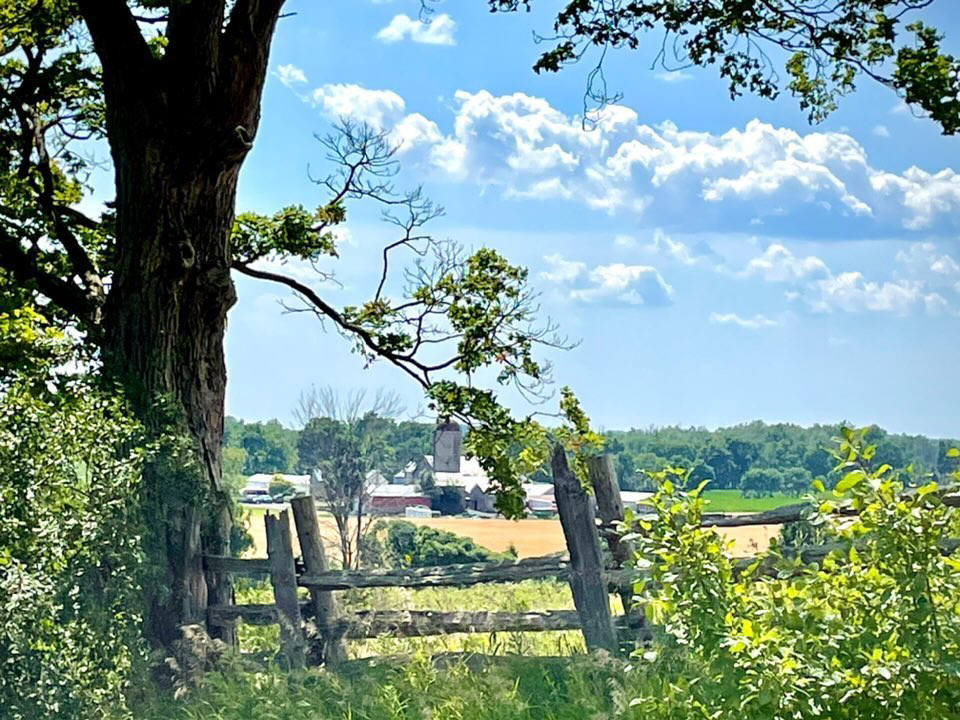
Freelton Farm, looking west on Concession Road 8 East.

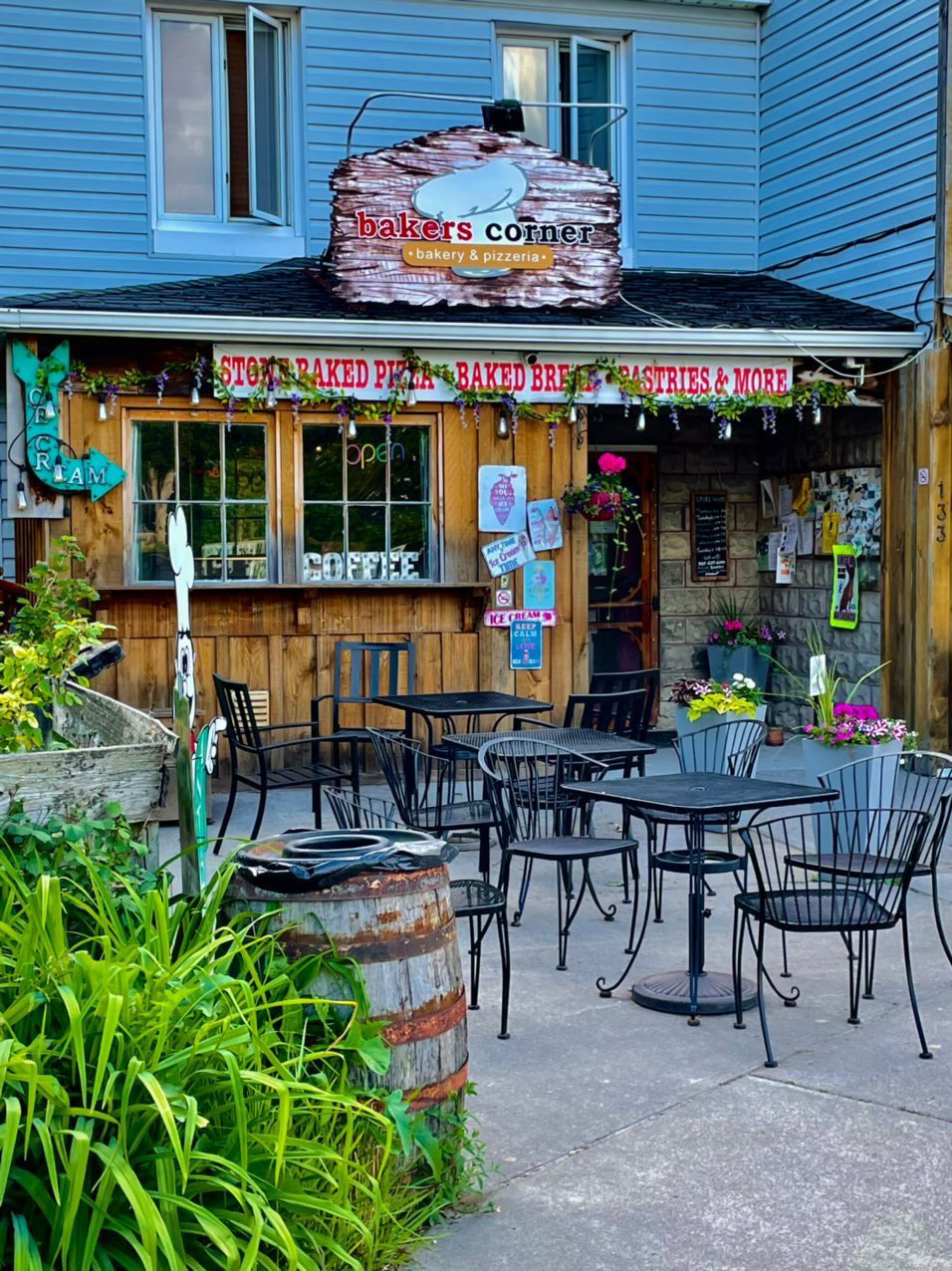
Bakery in Freelton.
