= Marigny-Brizay =

- Part of Jaunay-Marigny
- Location of Marigny-Brizay
- Location within France Location within Nouvelle-Aquitaine
- Coordinates: 46°44′47″N 0°22′37″E
- Country: France
- Region: Nouvelle-Aquitaine
- Department: Vienne
- Arrondissement: Poitiers
- Canton: Jaunay-Clan
- Commune: Jaunay-Marigny
- Area^{1}: 20.81 km^{2} (8.03 sq mi)
- Highest elevation: 154 m (505 ft)
- Lowest elevation: 61 m (200 ft)
- Population (2022): 1,300
  - Density: 62/km^{2} (160/sq mi)
- Time zone: UTC+01:00 (CET)
  - Summer (DST): UTC+02:00 (CEST)
- Postal code: 86380
- ^{1} French Land Register data, which excludes lakes, ponds, glaciers > 1 km^{2} (0.386 sq mi or 247 acres) and river estuaries.

Marigny-Brizay (French pronunciation: [maʁiɲi bʁizɛ]) is a former commune in the Vienne department in the Nouvelle-Aquitaine region in western France. On 1 January 2017, it was merged into the new commune Jaunay-Marigny. It is part of the arrondissement of Poitiers.

== See also ==
- Communes of the Vienne department
