= Hardouin de Péréfixe de Beaumont =

French Catholic archbishop and historian (1606–1671)

His Grace Hardouin de Péréfixe de Beaumont COHS
- Archbishop of Paris
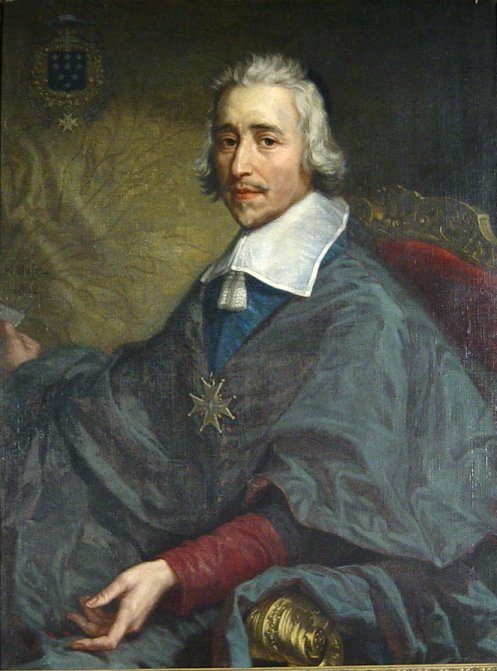
- Hardouin de Péréfixe de Beaumont, Archbishop of Paris
- Church: Roman Catholic Church
- Archdiocese: Paris
- See: Notre-Dame de Paris
- Installed: 24 March 1664
- Term ended: 1 January 1671
- Predecessor: Pierre de Marca
- Successor: François de Harlay de Champvallon
- Other post: Bishop of Rodez

Orders
- Consecration: 18 April 1649 by Gilles Boutault

Personal details
- Born: 1606 Beaumont, Vienne, France
- Died: 1 January 1671 (aged 64–65) Paris, France
- Education: College of Sorbonne, Paris

Paul Philippe Hardouin de Beaumont de Péréfixe (French: [pɔl filip aʁdwɛ̃ də bomɔ̃ də peʁefiks]; 1606 – 1 January 1671) was a French historian and clergyman. He was bishop of Rodez, then archbishop of Paris.

== Biography ==
Born at Beaumont, Vienne into a family of Neapolitan origin, he was the son of a maître d'hotel to Richelieu. he studied at the University of Poitiers and Paris where he received a doctorate at the Sorbonne. In 1644 he became preceptor to Louis XIV, who also made him his confessor. After being Abbot of Saint-Michel-en-l'Herm, he was appointed Bishop of Rodez in 1649 and he was elected member of the Académie française in 1654. In 1662, Louis XIV appointed him Archbishop of Paris, headmaster of Sorbonne, and commander of the Order of the Holy Spirit.

Engaged in the fight against Jansenism, Monseigneur de Beaumont de Perefixe published in 1664 an order "for the signature of the form of faith, drawn up in execution of the Constitutions of our Holy Fathers Popes Innocent X and Alexander VII" which aimed to compel the nuns of Port-Royal des Champs to sign a form condemning the Jansenist theses. He travelled several times to Port-Royal, deprived the recalcitrant of the sacraments, then ordered their captivity. The affair ended in 1669 with a new ordinance "in favor of the nuns of Port-Royal des Champs" which forced them to submit. Henry de Montherlant brilliantly staged all the protagonists of this struggle in his play, Port-Royal.

As his reputation of intransigence seemed firmly established – it is he who prohibited the Tartuffe Molière the day after his first public performance at the Palais Royal Theater in 1667 – as Hardouin Perefixe continued to enjoy all his life in the favor of Louis XIV. After having composed for the young king a collection of Latin maxims in 1647, he wrote for him a History of King Henry the Great which appeared in 1661. The book was very widely published and is translated into many languages.

Voltaire made some praiseworthy comments on this book: "Perefixe moves all sensible hearts, and has the memory of that prince, whose weaknesses were only those of a kind man, and whose virtues were those of a great man."

For Sainte-Beuve, Hardouin de Perefixe was "a rather agreeable writer in his" Life of Henry the Great, "rather learned, rather good-natured, but without character, without elevation of soul, or any exterior dignity; he was never at the height of his high position, and in more than one case incurred ridicule."

== See also ==
- Henri IV's white plume

Catholic Church titles
Preceded by Georges d'Armagnac	Bishop of Rodez; 1648–1662	Succeeded by Gabriel de Voyer de Paulmy d'Argenson
Preceded by Pierre de Marca	Archbishop of Paris; 1664–1671	Succeeded by François Harlay de Champvallon
