= Jaunay-Clan =

- Part of Jaunay-Marigny
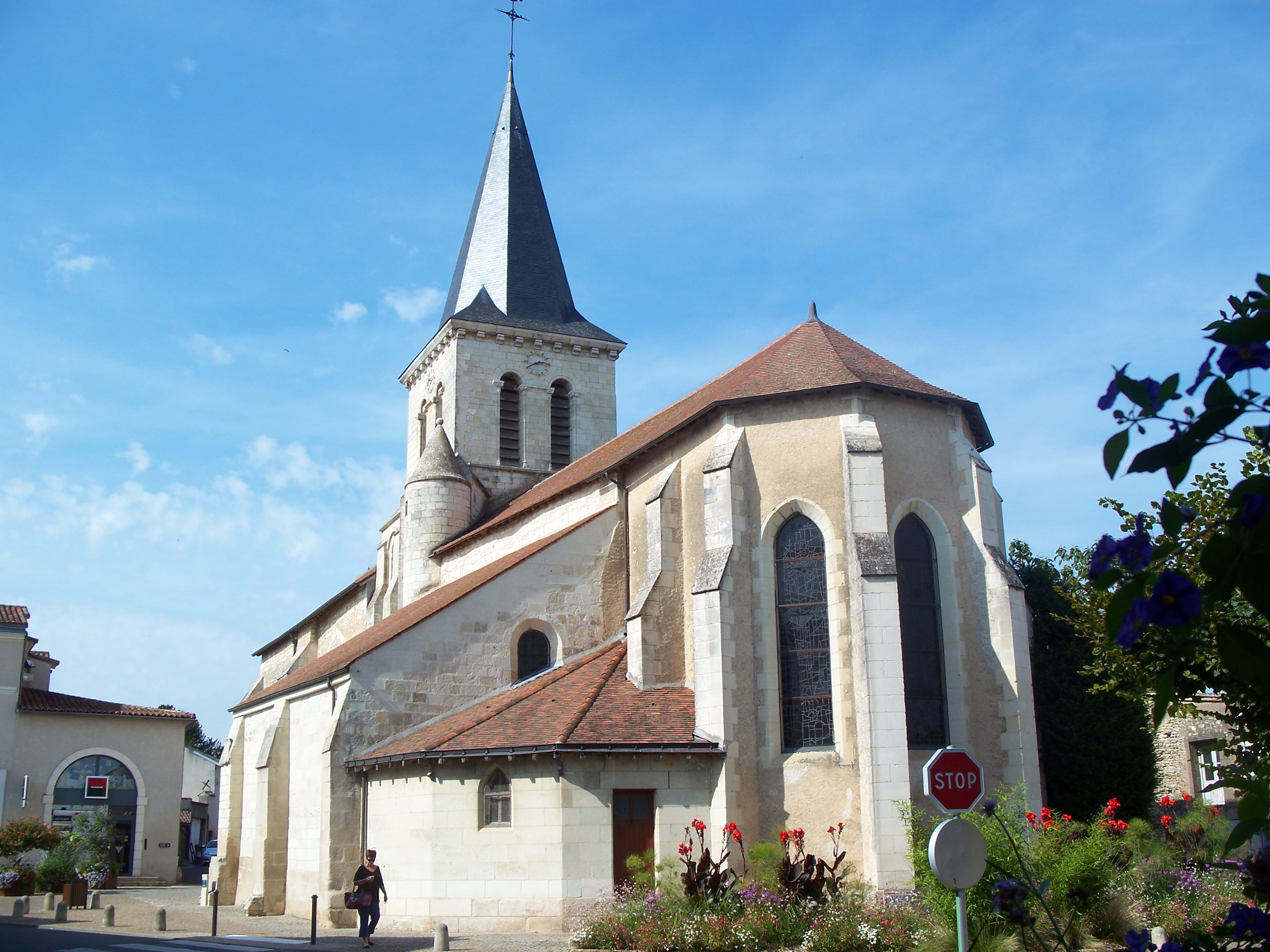
- The church of Saint-Denis, in Jaunay-Clan
- Location of Jaunay-Clan
- Location within France Location within Nouvelle-Aquitaine
- Coordinates: 46°41′11″N 0°22′15″E
- Country: France
- Region: Nouvelle-Aquitaine
- Department: Vienne
- Arrondissement: Poitiers
- Canton: Jaunay-Clan
- Commune: Jaunay-Marigny
- Area^{1}: 27.48 km^{2} (10.61 sq mi)
- Elevation: 95 m (312 ft)
- Highest elevation: 125 m (410 ft)
- Lowest elevation: 61 m (200 ft)
- Population (2022): 6,297
  - Density: 229.1/km^{2} (593.5/sq mi)
- Time zone: UTC+01:00 (CET)
  - Summer (DST): UTC+02:00 (CEST)
- Postal code: 86130
- ^{1} French Land Register data, which excludes lakes, ponds, glaciers > 1 km^{2} (0.386 sq mi or 247 acres) and river estuaries.

Jaunay-Clan (French pronunciation: [ʒonɛ klɑ̃]) is a former commune in the Vienne department, Nouvelle-Aquitaine, western France. On 1 January 2017, it was merged into the new commune Jaunay-Marigny. It is twinned with the town of Cavan, Ireland.

== See also ==
- Futuroscope
- Communes of the Vienne department
