= Saint-Cyr, Vienne =

Saint-Cyr
- Part of Beaumont Saint-Cyr
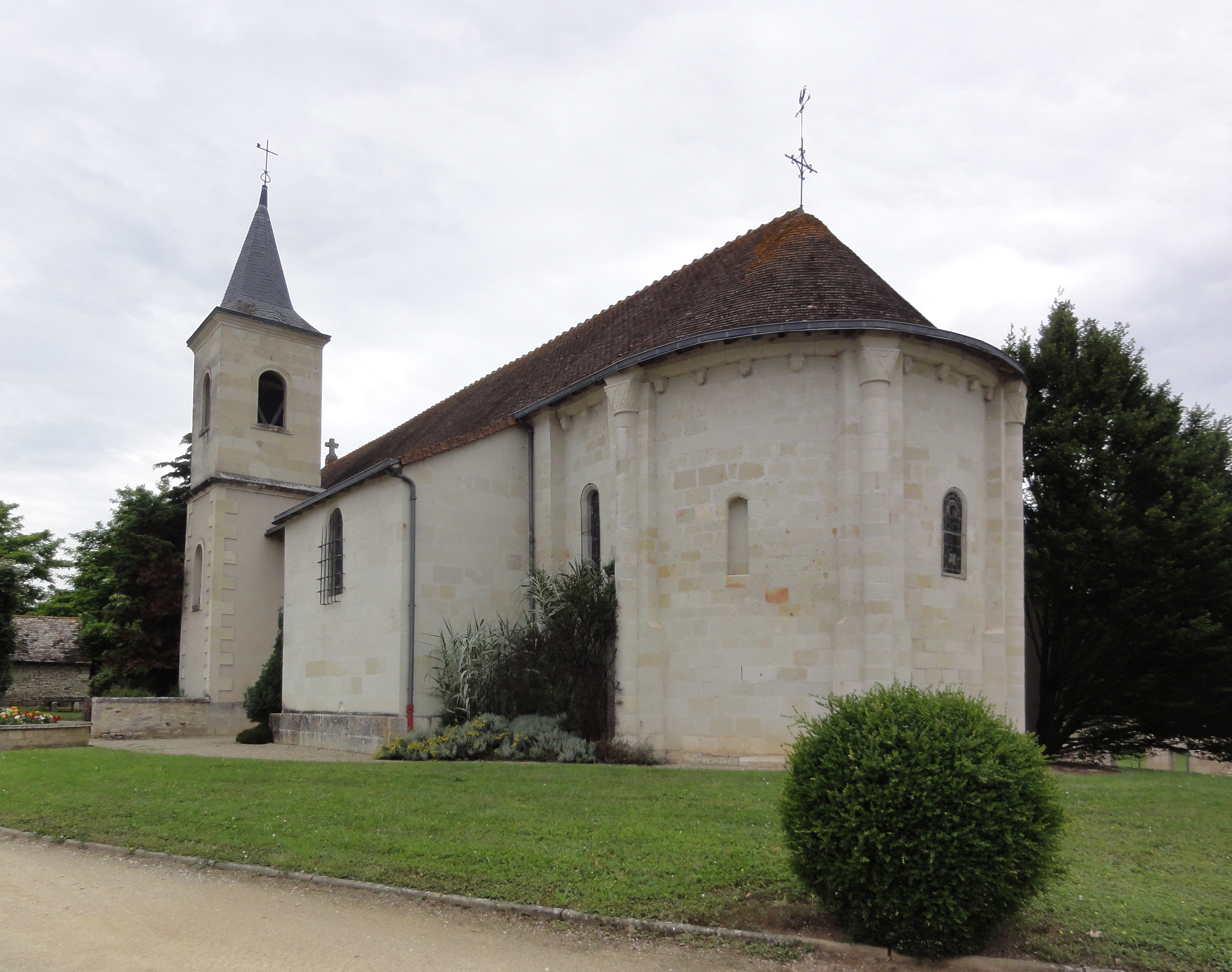
- The church in Saint-Cyr
- Location of Saint-Cyr
- Location within France Location within Nouvelle-Aquitaine
- Coordinates: 46°43′02″N 0°27′16″E
- Country: France
- Region: Nouvelle-Aquitaine
- Department: Vienne
- Arrondissement: Poitiers
- Canton: Jaunay-Clan
- Commune: Beaumont Saint-Cyr
- Area^{1}: 15.03 km^{2} (5.80 sq mi)
- Elevation: 150 m (490 ft)
- Highest elevation: 144 m (472 ft)
- Lowest elevation: 56 m (184 ft)
- Population (2022): 1,110
  - Density: 73.9/km^{2} (191/sq mi)
- Time zone: UTC+01:00 (CET)
  - Summer (DST): UTC+02:00 (CEST)
- Postal code: 86130
- ^{1} French Land Register data, which excludes lakes, ponds, glaciers > 1 km^{2} (0.386 sq mi or 247 acres) and river estuaries.

Saint-Cyr (French pronunciation: [sɛ̃ siʁ]) is a former commune in the Vienne department in the Nouvelle-Aquitaine region in western France. On 1 January 2017, it was merged into the new commune Beaumont Saint-Cyr.

== See also ==
- Communes of the Vienne department
