= Chabournay =

- Commune
- Location of Chabournay
- Location within France Location within Nouvelle-Aquitaine
- Coordinates: 46°43′08″N 0°15′30″E
- Country: France
- Region: Nouvelle-Aquitaine
- Department: Vienne
- Arrondissement: Poitiers
- Canton: Jaunay-Marigny

Government
  - Mayor (2025–2026): Mikaël Journeau
- Area^{1}: 5.84 km^{2} (2.25 sq mi)
- Elevation: 93 m (305 ft)
- Highest elevation: 110 m (360 ft)
- Lowest elevation: 77 m (253 ft)
- Population (2023): 1,274
  - Density: 218/km^{2} (565/sq mi)
- Time zone: UTC+01:00 (CET)
  - Summer (DST): UTC+02:00 (CEST)
- INSEE/Postal code: 86048 /86380
- ^{1} French Land Register data, which excludes lakes, ponds, glaciers > 1 km^{2} (0.386 sq mi or 247 acres) and river estuaries.

Chabournay (French pronunciation: [ʃabuʁnɛ]) is a commune in the Vienne department in the Nouvelle-Aquitaine region in western France.

== See also ==
- Communes of the Vienne department
