= Jaunay-Marigny =

- Commune
- Location of Jaunay-Marigny
- Location within France Location within Nouvelle-Aquitaine
- Coordinates: 46°41′10″N 0°22′16″E
- Country: France
- Region: Nouvelle-Aquitaine
- Department: Vienne
- Arrondissement: Poitiers
- Canton: Jaunay-Marigny
- Intercommunality: CU Grand Poitiers

Government
  - Mayor (2020–2026): Jérôme Neveux
- Area^{1}: 48.29 km^{2} (18.64 sq mi)
- Population (2023): 7,528
  - Density: 155.9/km^{2} (403.8/sq mi)
- Time zone: UTC+01:00 (CET)
  - Summer (DST): UTC+02:00 (CEST)
- INSEE/Postal code: 86115 /86130, 86380
- ^{1} French Land Register data, which excludes lakes, ponds, glaciers > 1 km^{2} (0.386 sq mi or 247 acres) and river estuaries.

Jaunay-Marigny (French pronunciation: [ʒonɛ maʁiɲi]) is a commune in the department of Vienne, western France. The municipality was established on 1 January 2017 by merger of the former communes of Jaunay-Clan (the seat) and Marigny-Brizay.

== Population ==
Population data refer to the area corresponding with the commune as of January 2025.

Historical population
Year	Pop.	±% p.a.
1968	3,739	—
1975	4,750	+3.48%
1982	5,544	+2.23%
1990	5,954	+0.90%
1999	6,605	+1.16%
2007	6,923	+0.59%
2012	7,145	+0.63%
2017	7,530	+1.06%
2023	7,528	−0.00%
Source: INSEE

== See also ==
- Communes of the Vienne department
