= Geoff Smale =

New Zealand yacht racer

Geoffrey Andrew Smale (5 November 1924 – 9 April 2011) was a New Zealand yachtsman and a North Shore-based businessman.

== Sailing ==
He represented New Zealand in yachting at the 1968 Summer Olympics in Mexico City, coming 8th in the Flying Dutchman class. In 1958, he put New Zealand on the sailing map by winning the Prince of Wales cup at Cowes, Isle of Wight.

== Death ==
In 2011, he died aged 86, when the DynAero microlight plane he was flying from Auckland to Ashburton crashed into ranges near Nelson. He began flying about three years prior to the accident. He was actively involved in radio sailing coming second at the One Metre World Championship and designed a number of successful designs.
