= Beaumont, Vienne =

Beaumont
- Part of Beaumont Saint-Cyr
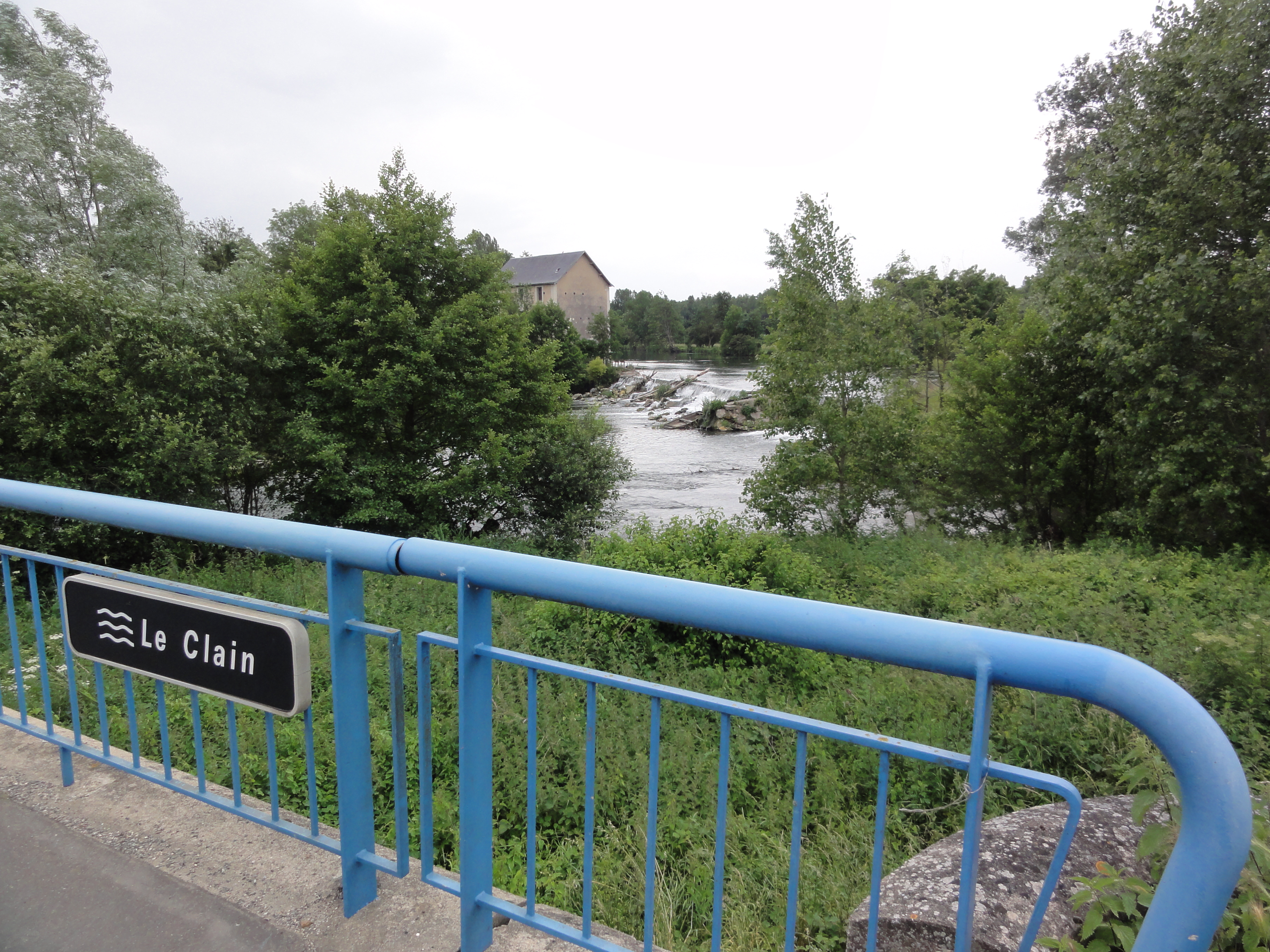
- The Clain river, in Beaumont

- Coat of arms
- Location of Beaumont
- Location within France Location within Nouvelle-Aquitaine
- Coordinates: 46°44′18″N 0°25′46″E
- Country: France
- Region: Nouvelle-Aquitaine
- Department: Vienne
- Arrondissement: Châtellerault
- Canton: Jaunay-Clan
- Commune: Beaumont Saint-Cyr
- Area^{1}: 21.44 km^{2} (8.28 sq mi)
- Elevation: 62 m (203 ft)
- Highest elevation: 151 m (495 ft)
- Lowest elevation: 56 m (184 ft)
- Population (2022): 1,831
  - Density: 85.40/km^{2} (221.2/sq mi)
- Time zone: UTC+01:00 (CET)
  - Summer (DST): UTC+02:00 (CEST)
- Postal code: 86490
- ^{1} French Land Register data, which excludes lakes, ponds, glaciers > 1 km^{2} (0.386 sq mi or 247 acres) and river estuaries.

Beaumont (French pronunciation: [bomɔ̃]) is a former commune in the Vienne department in the Nouvelle-Aquitaine region in western France. On 1 January 2017, it was merged into the new commune Beaumont Saint-Cyr.

== See also ==
- Communes of the Vienne department
