= Beaumont Saint-Cyr =

- Commune
- Location of Beaumont Saint-Cyr
- Location within France Location within Nouvelle-Aquitaine
- Coordinates: 46°44′17″N 0°25′44″E
- Country: France
- Region: Nouvelle-Aquitaine
- Department: Vienne
- Arrondissement: Châtellerault
- Canton: Jaunay-Marigny
- Intercommunality: CU Grand Poitiers

Government
  - Mayor (2020–2026): Nicolas Réveillault
- Area^{1}: 36.47 km^{2} (14.08 sq mi)
- Population (2023): 2,908
  - Density: 79.74/km^{2} (206.5/sq mi)
- Time zone: UTC+01:00 (CET)
  - Summer (DST): UTC+02:00 (CEST)
- INSEE/Postal code: 86019 /86490
- ^{1} French Land Register data, which excludes lakes, ponds, glaciers > 1 km^{2} (0.386 sq mi or 247 acres) and river estuaries.

Beaumont Saint-Cyr (French pronunciation: [bomɔ̃ sɛ̃ siʁ]) is a commune in the department of Vienne, western France. The municipality was established on 1 January 2017 by merger of the former communes of Beaumont (the seat) and Saint-Cyr.

== Population ==
Population data refer to the area corresponding with the commune as of January 2025.

Historical population
Year	Pop.	±% p.a.
1968	1,876	—
1975	1,924	+0.36%
1982	2,052	+0.92%
1990	2,295	+1.41%
1999	2,412	+0.55%
2007	2,719	+1.51%
2012	2,937	+1.55%
2017	3,035	+0.66%
2023	2,908	−0.71%
Source: INSEE

== See also ==
- Communes of the Vienne department
