= Pierre de Marca =

French bishop and historian (1594–1662)

His Grace Pierre de Marca
- Archbishop of Paris
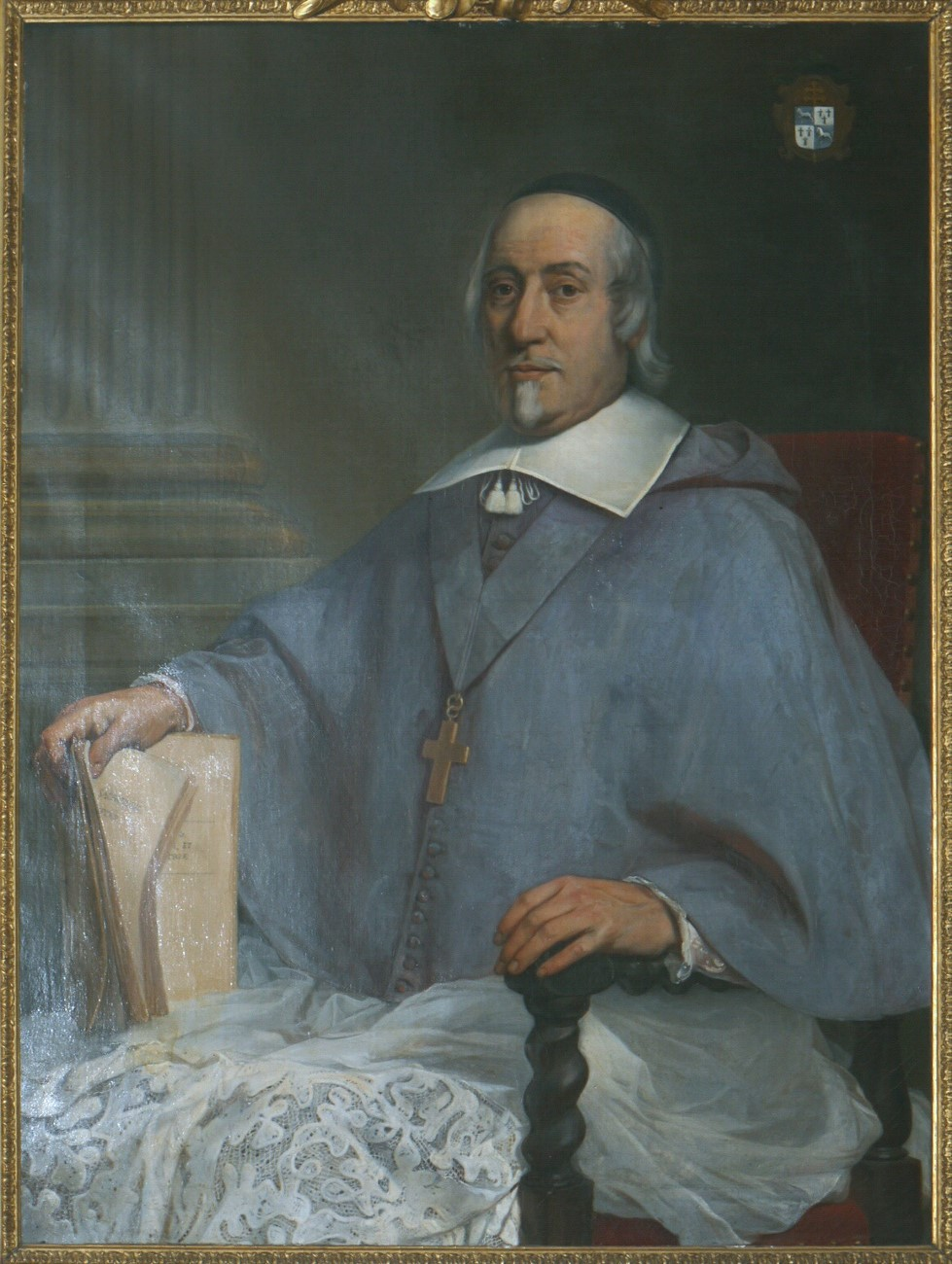
- Engraving by Gérard Edelinck, 1696
- Church: Roman Catholic Church
- Archdiocese: Paris
- See: Notre-Dame de Paris
- Installed: 5 June 1662
- Term ended: 29 June 1662
- Predecessor: Jean François Paul de Gondi
- Successor: Hardouin de Péréfixe de Beaumont
- Other posts: Archbishop of Toulouse; Bishop of Couserans

Personal details
- Born: 24 January 1594 Gan, Béarn, Navarre
- Died: 29 June 1662 (aged 68) Paris, France
- Spouse: Marguerite de Forgues (m. 1618)
- Education: University of Toulouse

Pierre de Marca (24 January 1594 – 29 June 1662) was a French bishop and historian, born at Gan in Béarn of a family distinguished in the magistracy.

== Life ==
His family was known among judicial circles in the 16th century, and maintained the Roman Catholic faith after the official introduction of the Reformed religion into Navarre. After having studied law at the University of Toulouse, he practised successfully at Pau. But he was ambitious, and turned to a larger sphere.

He ardently called for the armed intervention of King Louis XIII in Béarn. He published his first writing, Discours d'un Béarnais, très fidèle sujet du roi, sur l'Édit du retablissement de la religion catholique dans tout le Béarn (1618), which supported Catholicism as the established state religion. After an easy military campaign of 1620, the possessions which had been taken by the Protestants were given back to the Roman Catholic Church. Marca supervised the restoration of properties to the Catholic Church.

During the siege of La Rochelle, he performed a mission which brought him in touch with Richelieu, who shortly afterwards nominated him as intendant de justice in Béarn (1631). In 1639 Marca was summoned to Paris to serve as counsellor of state. The following year, the question of the intervention of kings in the election of bishops having been raised in a pamphlet by Charles Hersent (Optatus Gallus de cavendo schismate, 1640), Marca defended what were then called the liberties of the Gallican Church, in his celebrated treatise De concordia sacerdotii et imperii seu de libertatibus ecclesiae gallicanae (Paris, 1641). He was soon rewarded for this service. He was widowed around that time, and decided to enter the clerical orders.

Although Marca had not yet taken even the minor holy orders, he was nominated as bishop of Couserans (Gascony) by the king on 28 December 1641. But Pope Urban VIII refused to give his sanction. It was only after Marca had formally denied those propositions contained in De concordia which were displeasing to Rome that he was proclaimed in the consistory (13 January 1648).

During this time, and until 1651, he served as governor of the province of Catalonia, then occupied by the French. After the Treaty of the Pyrenees, Marca was sent to direct the conference that had been formed to fix the limits of Roussillon, which had just been ceded to France (1660).

Marca allied with Cardinal Mazarin, and remained faithful to him even during the Fronde. As a recompense, he was nominated archbishop of Toulouse (28 May 1652). He had to wait for the bulls of investiture until 23 March 1654.

It was difficult for him to please both pope and king. In the struggle against the Jansenists, Marca used all the influence he had with the clergy to secure the passage of the apostolic constitution of 31 March 1653 (Relation de ce qui s'est fait depuis 1653 dans les assemblées des évêques au sujet des cinq propositions, 1657). But, in the rebellion raised by Cardinal de Retz, archbishop of Paris, against the king, he took the part of the king against the pope.

Michel Le Tellier having ordered him to refute a thesis of the college of Clermont on the infallibility of the pope, Marca wrote a treatise which was most Gallican in its ideas, but refused to publish it for fear of drawing down the indignation of Rome. These tactics were successful. When Retz, weary of a struggle without definite results, resigned the archbishopric, Marca became his successor (26 February 1662). He did not derive much profit from this new favor, as he died in Paris on the following 29 June, without his nomination having been sanctioned by the pope.

When very young Marca had shown an interest in the history of his native land. In 1617, at the age of twenty-three, he had set to work looking through archives, copying charters, and corresponding with the principal men of learning of his time, the brothers Dupuy, André Duchesne and Jean Besly, whom he visited in Poitou. His Histoire de Béarn was published at Paris in 1640. It was not so well received at the time as his De concordia, but has been more appreciated by posterity. If Marca's criticism is too often undecided, both in the ancient epochs, where he supports the text by a certain amount of guesswork and in certain points where he touches on religion, yet he always gives the text correctly. A number of chapters end with an interesting collection of charters. It is to be regretted that this incomplete work does not go beyond 1300.

During his long stay in Catalonia, Marca conducted research to support a geographical and historical study of this province, which was bound to France by so many political and literary associations. Etienne Baluze, who became his secretary in 1656, helped him with the work and finished it, adding appendices and publishing the whole in 1688 under the title Marca hispanica.

Marca married Marguerite de Forgues on 4 June 1618. They had one son and three daughters together. Their son Galactoire was elected as president of the parliament of Navarre; he died on 10 February 1689.

Two biographies of Marca were written in Latin by intimate friends. Baluze, his secretary, wrote Epistola ad Samuelem Sorbierium, de vita, gestis et scriptis Petri de Marca, Paris, 1663. His cousin, Paul de Faget, published a biography of the bishop at the beginning of a collection of Marca's theological pamphlets, first published by Faget in 1668. This collection contained four of Marca's treatises on the Eucharist, the sacrifice of the Mass, the erection of the patriarchate of Constantinople (in Latin), and the sacrament of the Eucharist (in French). It was supposed to contain heretical propositions and caused a good deal of scandal. Baluze and Faget criticized each other in an effort to defend the memory of the prelate.

Catholic Church titles
Preceded by Jean François Paul de Gondi, cardinal de Retz	Archbishop of Paris; 1662–1664	Succeeded by Hardouin de Péréfixe de Beaumont
