= Battle of Ivry =

1590 Battle of the French Wars of Religion

- Part of the French War of Religion (1587–1594) and the Anglo–Spanish War
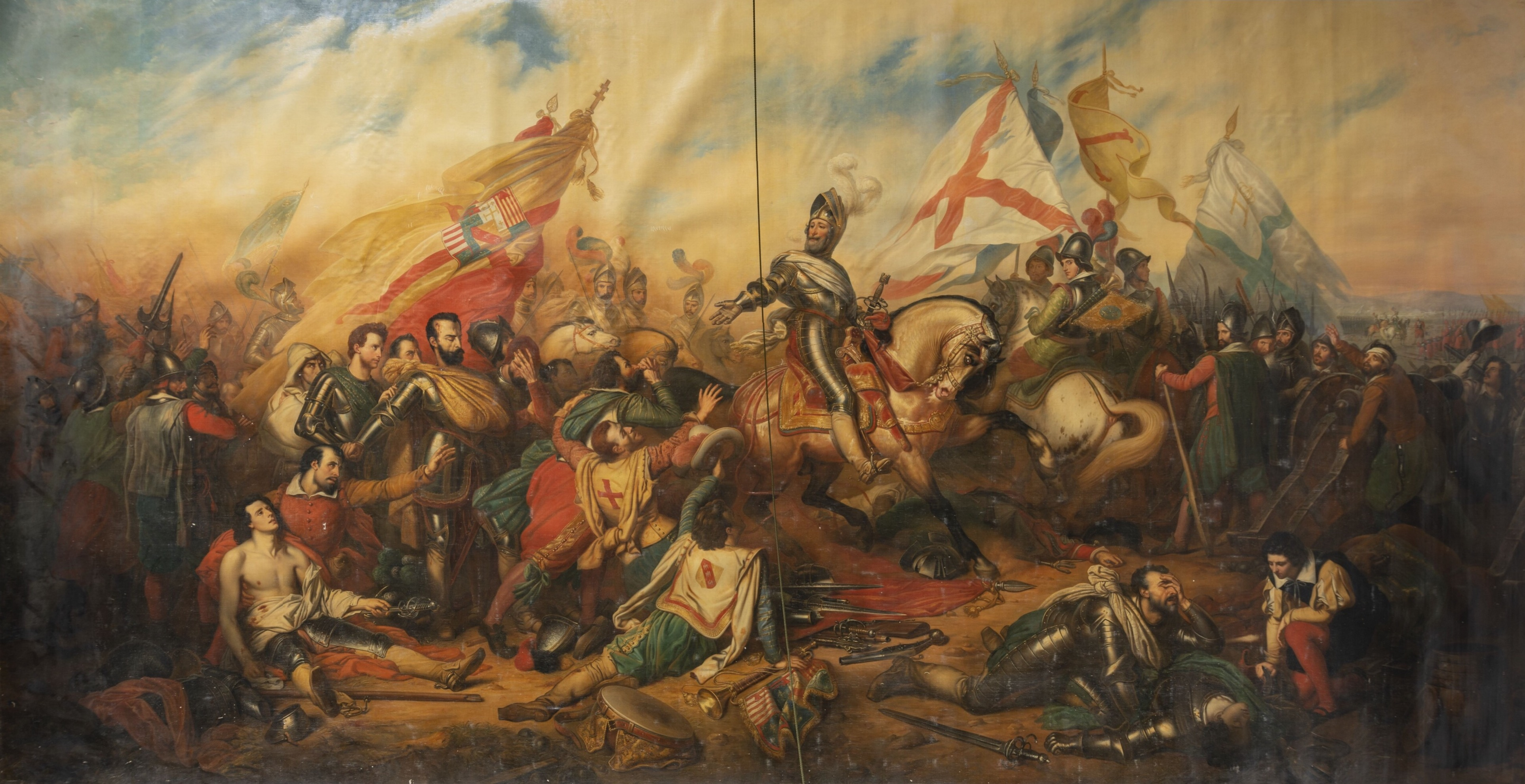
- Henry IV at the battle of Ivry, by Charles de Steuben (1838–1842).
Date	14 March 1590
Location	Ivry, Eure, France
Result	Royalist victory

Belligerents
(Kingdom of France) French Crown; Supported by: England	Catholic League; Supported by: Spain

Commanders and leaders
(Kingdom of France) Henry IV of France (Kingdom of France) Marshal de Biron	Duc de Mayenne; Duke of Aumale (POW) (Spain) Count of Egmont †

Strength
12,000 infantry, 3,000 cavalry	13,000 infantry, 4,000 cavalry

Casualties and losses
500	6,000 killed or wounded 4,000 prisoners

The Battle of Ivry was fought on 14 March 1590, during the French Wars of Religion. The battle was a decisive victory for Henry IV of France, leading French royal and English forces against the Catholic League under the Duc de Mayenne and Spanish forces under the Count of Egmont. Henry's forces were victorious and he went on to lay siege to Paris.

The battle occurred on the plain of Épieds, Eure near Ivry (later renamed Ivry-la-Bataille), Normandy. Ivry-la-Bataille is located on the river Eure and about thirty miles west of Paris, at the boundary between the Île-de-France and the Beauce regions.

== Prelude ==
Henry IV had moved rapidly to besiege Dreux, a town controlled by the Catholic League. As Mayenne followed intending to raise the siege, Henry withdrew but stayed within sight. He deployed his army on the plain of Saint André between the towns of Nonancourt and Ivry. Henry had been reinforced by English troops sent in support by Queen Elizabeth I.

- Henry had 12,000 foot soldiers (including English and Swiss) and 3,000 men on horseback.
- The army of the Catholic League, led by the Duke of Mayenne, had 13,000 foot soldiers and 4,000 cavalry, which consisted of citizens led by priests and rebellious nobles, an assortment of German and Swiss mercenaries under Appenzell, and the troopers of the Guise family. Included in this force were 2,000 Walloon cavalry brought over from Flanders under Philip, Count of Egmont,

== Battle ==
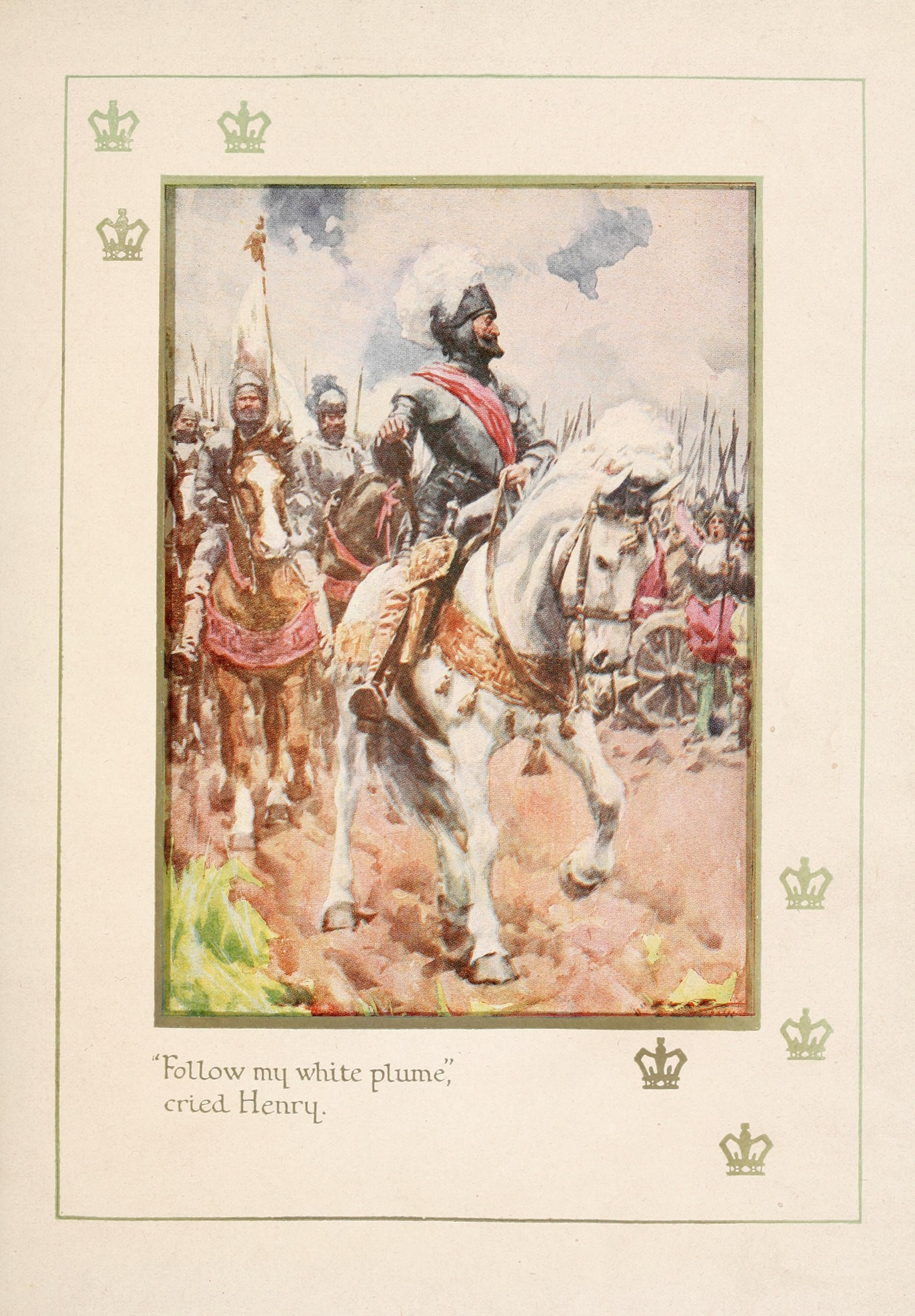
Henry at Battle of Ivry

At first light on 14 March 1590, the two armies engaged. Before the battle, the king famously spurred his troops:

"Companions! If you today run at risk with me, I will also run at risk with you; I will be victorious or die. God is with us. Look at his and our enemies. Look at your king. Hold your ranks, I beg of you; and if the heat of battle makes you leave them, think also of rallying back: therein lies the key to victory. You will find it among those three trees that you can see over there on your right side. If you lose your ensigns, cornets or flags, do never lose sight of my panache; you will always find it on the road to honour and victory."

The action began with a few deadly cannon volleys from the six pieces of the royal artillery, which was under the command of the master, La Guiche. The cavalry of the two sides then clashed with a dreadful force. The Duke of Mayenne followed up with the mercenary troops of the Guelders across the open field. The mercenaries, who were mostly sympathetic to the Protestant cause, fired in the air and put their spears at rest.

Mayenne charged with such a fury that after a terrible fusillade and a struggle of a full quarter of an hour which left the field covered with dead, following the defection of his mercenaries, the opposing left flank fled and the right was pierced and gave way.

Aumont soon overcame the League's light horse and their royalist counterparts retreated under the attack of a Walloon squadron backed up by two squadrons from the League. It was then the turn of Jean VI d'Aumont, the Duc de Montpensier and the Baron de Biron to charge the foreign cavalry, forcing it into a retreat. Marshal de Biron, in command of the rear-guard with English and Swiss troops on both flanks, joined up with the king, who, without stopping after his victory, had crossed the river Eure in pursuit of the enemy.

However, the decisive event took place elsewhere on the battlefield: the King charged the League's lancers, who were unable to get far enough back to use their weapons.

Mayenne was driven back, the Duke of Aumale forced to surrender, and the Count of Egmont killed. The Duke of Mayenne had lost the battle. Henry pursued the losers, many of whom surrendered for fear of falling into worse hands, their horses being in no condition to get them away from danger. The countryside was full of Leaguers and Spaniards in flight, with the king's victorious army pursuing and scattering the remnants of the larger groups that dispersed and re-gathered.

== Aftermath ==
Henry defeated Mayenne at Ivry so that he would become the only credible claimant to the throne of France. However, he was unsuccessful in his subsequent siege of Paris. He would not be accepted into the city until 1594, following his conversion to Roman Catholicism the previous year. Henry was advised that the Parisians, like much of the French people, would not accept a Protestant king.

Thomas Babington Macaulay wrote a famous poem about the battle, entitled "The Battle of Ivry." It begins:

Now glory to the Lord of Hosts, from whom all glories are!
And glory to our Sovereign Liege, King Henry of Navarre!

== See also ==
- Henri IV's white plume
- Henri IV of France

== Bibliography ==
- Black, Jeremy (2005). European Warfare, 1494–1660 Warfare and History. Routledge. ISBN 9781134477081.
- Arlette Jouanna and Jacqueline Boucher, Dominique Biloghi, Guy Thiec. Histoire et dictionnaire des Guerres de religion. Collection: Bouquins. Paris: Laffont, 1998. ISBN 2-221-07425-4
- Morris, T.A. (2002). Europe and England in the Sixteenth Century. Routledge. ISBN 9781134748198.
- Parmelee, Lisa Ferraro (1996). Good Newes from Fraunce: French Anti-League Propaganda in Late Elizabethan England. University of Rochester Press. ISBN 9781878822659.
- Guy, John (1990). Tudor England. Oxford University Press. ISBN 9780192852137.
