= Henri IV's white plume =

Emblem of King Henri IV of France

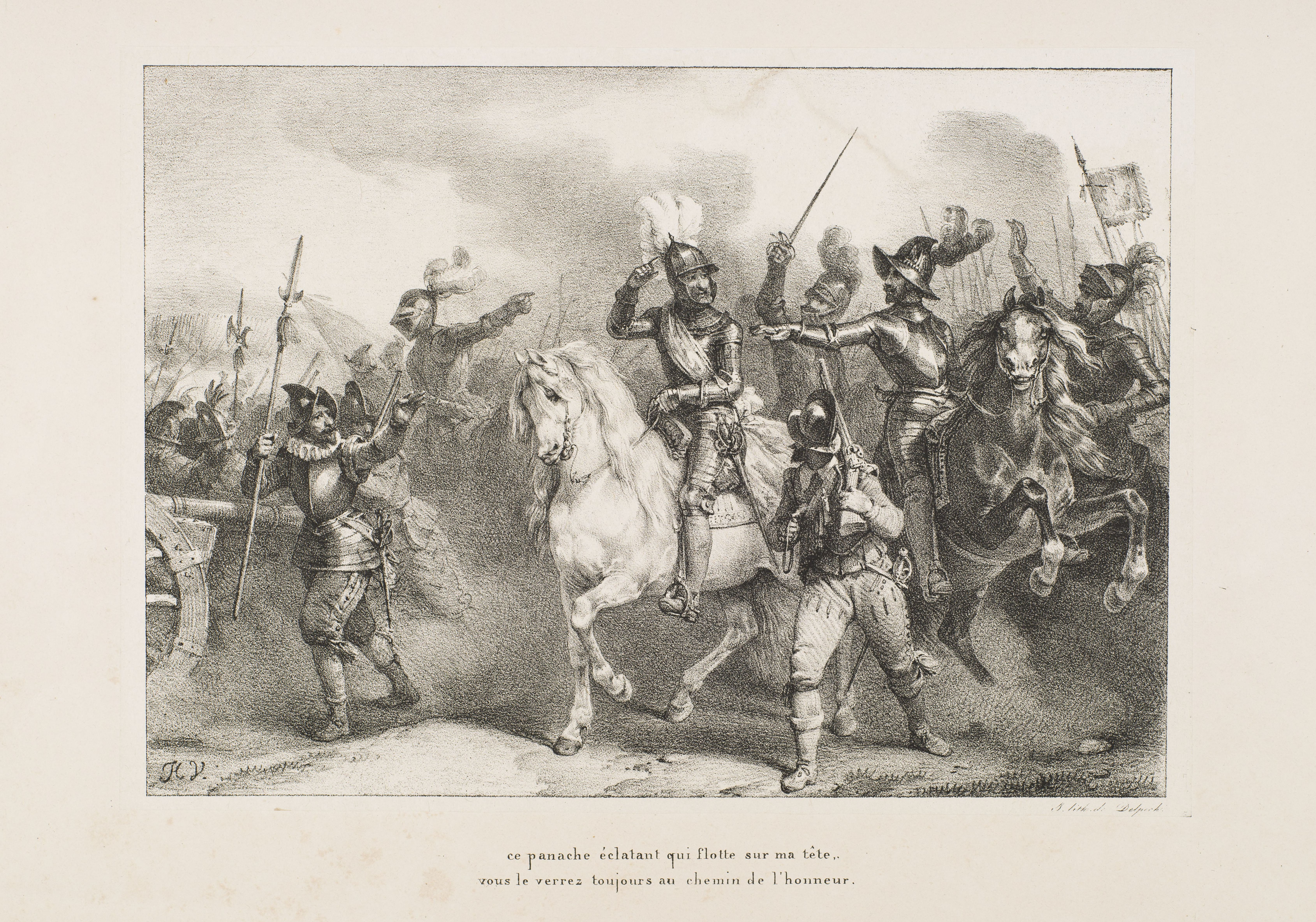
Henri IV showing his white plume at the Battle of Ivry. Lithograph by Carle Vernet (1758–1836). Below the image, is an adaptation of the famous formula.

Henri IV's white plume, emblem of King Henri IV of France, was originally a large bouquet of white feathers worn on Henri IV's helmet during the battle of Ivry on March 14, 1590, during the Wars of Religion. The plume, mentioned in the first accounts written just after the battle, served as a rallying point for the royal army on the battlefield. It was also a symbol that brought together Catholic supporters of Henri IV and Huguenots, and then, after Henri IV's conversion, all Frenchmen.

In the first half of the 17th century, Agrippa d'Aubigné coined the phrase "Ralliez-vous à mon panache blanc" ("Rally to my white plume"), which Hardouin de Péréfixe and Voltaire later added to in the highly successful La Henriade. The white plume gradually became a specific attribute of Henri IV, the main elements of his legend having been established.

In the 19th century, the white plume became a royalist and legitimist emblem. During the Restoration, it symbolized the rallying of the French to the Bourbon monarchy, attempting to assimilate Louis XVIII to a new Henri IV. It also lent historical depth to the use of the white flag. In 1873, to justify his plan for monarchical restoration and his rejection of the tricolor flag, the Comte de Chambord appealed to the imagination associated with the white plume.

Under the Third Republic, images depicting Henri IV and his white plume multiplied to meet the needs of developing school education. The rallying formula was taught in schools. Henri IV became a patriotic king, integrated into the republican and national pantheon, his white plume symbolizing the union of the French.

The white plume then became a personal folkloric attribute of Henri IV, like the hen in the pot, which is still used today.

== Birth of an emblem ==
=== Warrior emblem ===
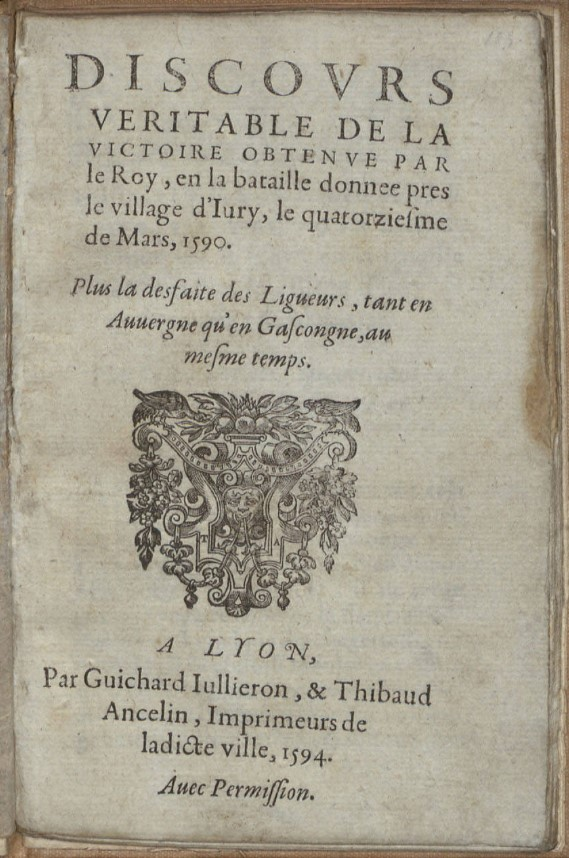
Title page of Discours veritable de la victoire obtenue par le roy en la bataille donnée près le village d'Ivry, reprinted, Lyon, 1594.

Henri IV's white plume was originally an emblem of war, worn at the battle of Ivry on March 14, 1590, one of the battles of the Wars of Religion. It was not an emblem reserved for the king. In the 16th century, the high nobility commonly wore plumes, and large feather bouquets, often white, during battles. They are made of natural feathers, chosen from the most white. Most often, these are ostrich or peacock feathers. Apart from the military use of plumes, feathers were an indispensable part of men's headgear at the time.

At the time of the Battle of Ivry, feather color was often a sign of recognition: supporters of the King wore white plumes, Spaniards red plumes, and Ligueurs white and black plumes. It was during the Wars of Religion that white became a color associated with the King of France.

Oils on wood glorifying the military bravery of Henri IV, the first quarter of the 17th century, Château de Pau

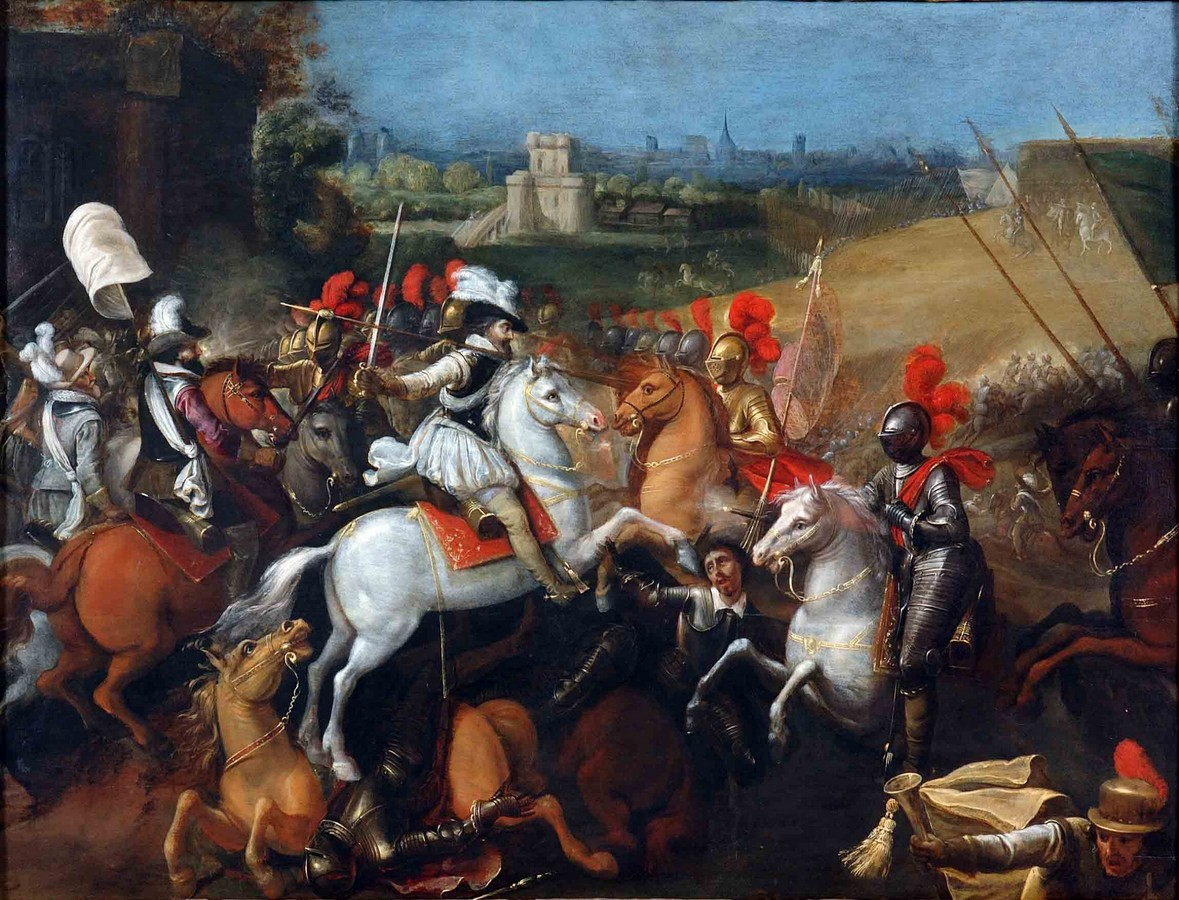
Henri IV at the Battle of Arques.

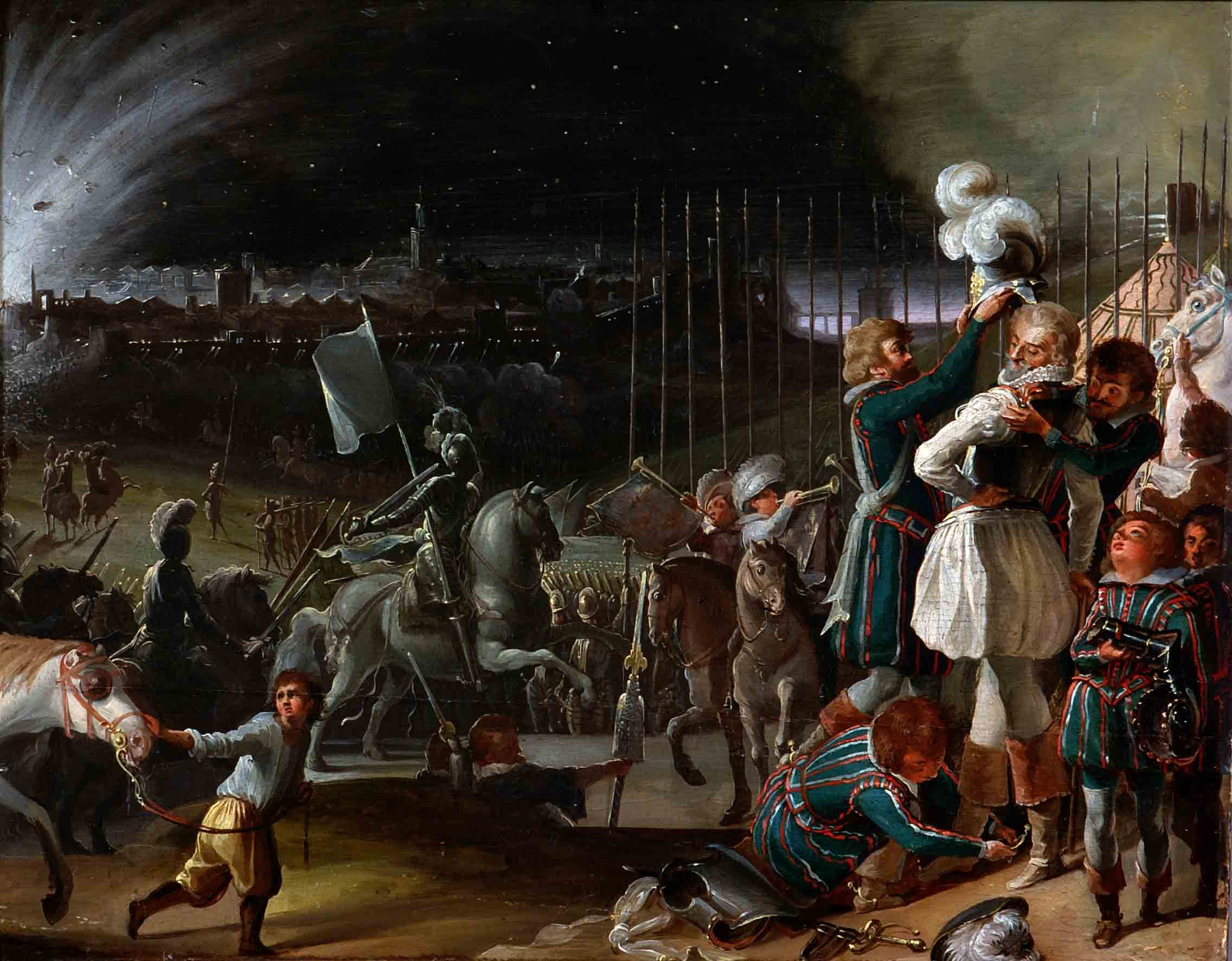
Henri IV besieging Paris.

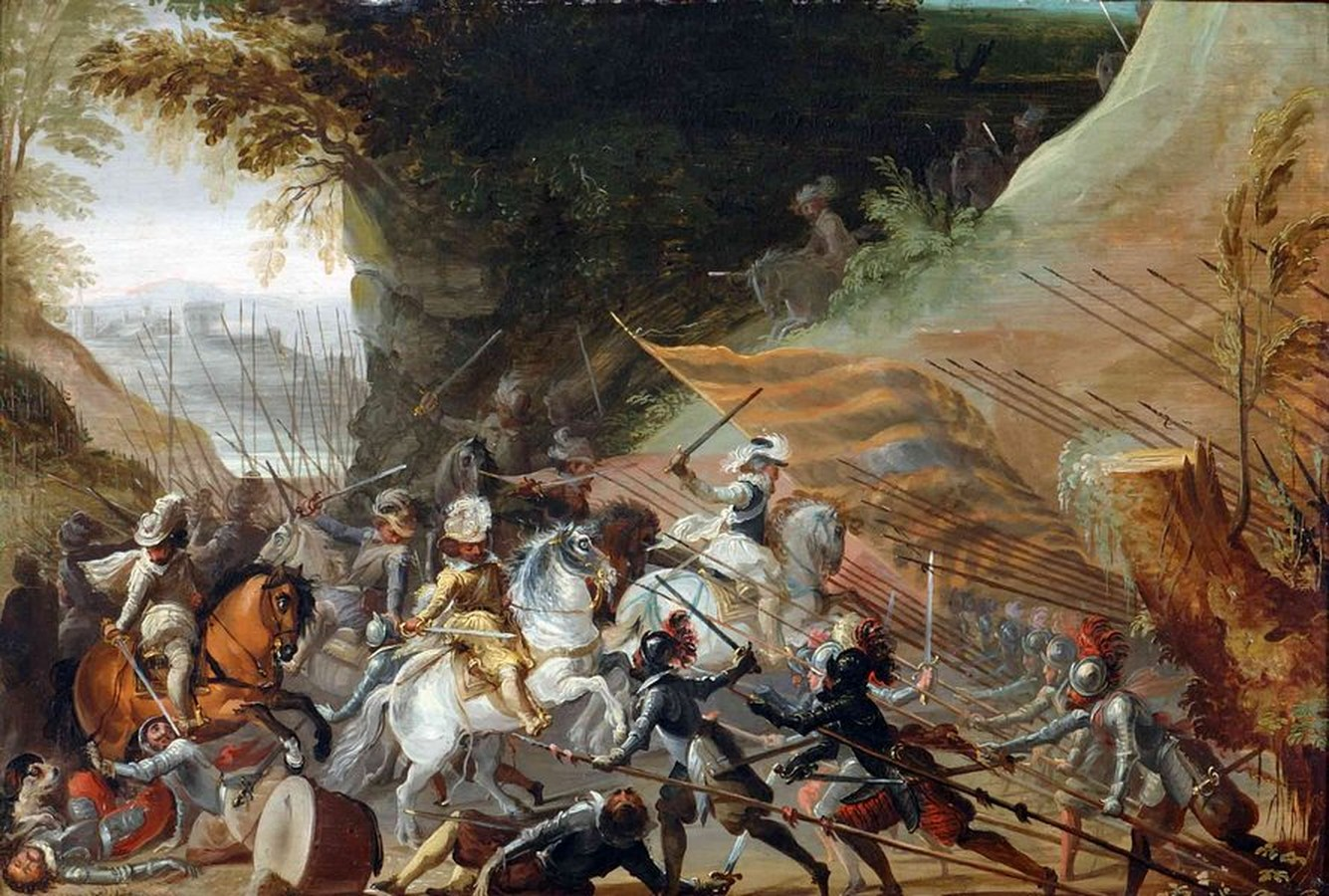
The Battle of Fontaine-Française.

At the battle of Ivry, the two opposing armies, the royal army on one side and the League army on the other wore plumes. Henri IV wore a large bouquet of feathers, making him "quite remarkable for the large white plume he wore on his teste, and another on his horse", according to the Discours véritable de la victoire obtenue par le Roy en la bataille donnée près le village d'Ivry..., often attributed to Étienne Pasquier, published shortly after the battle and widely circulated.

The Gascon poet Guillaume de Saluste du Bartas dedicated another work to the battle of Ivry in the same year as the event, just before his death in August 1590. In his verses, du Bartas, driven by a fairytale imagination, likens the plume to a shrub, giving this ornament an astonishing metamorphosis

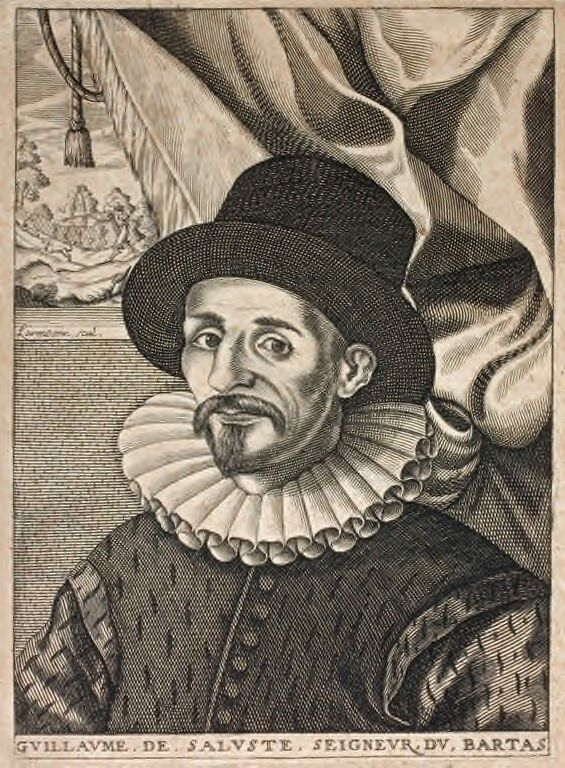
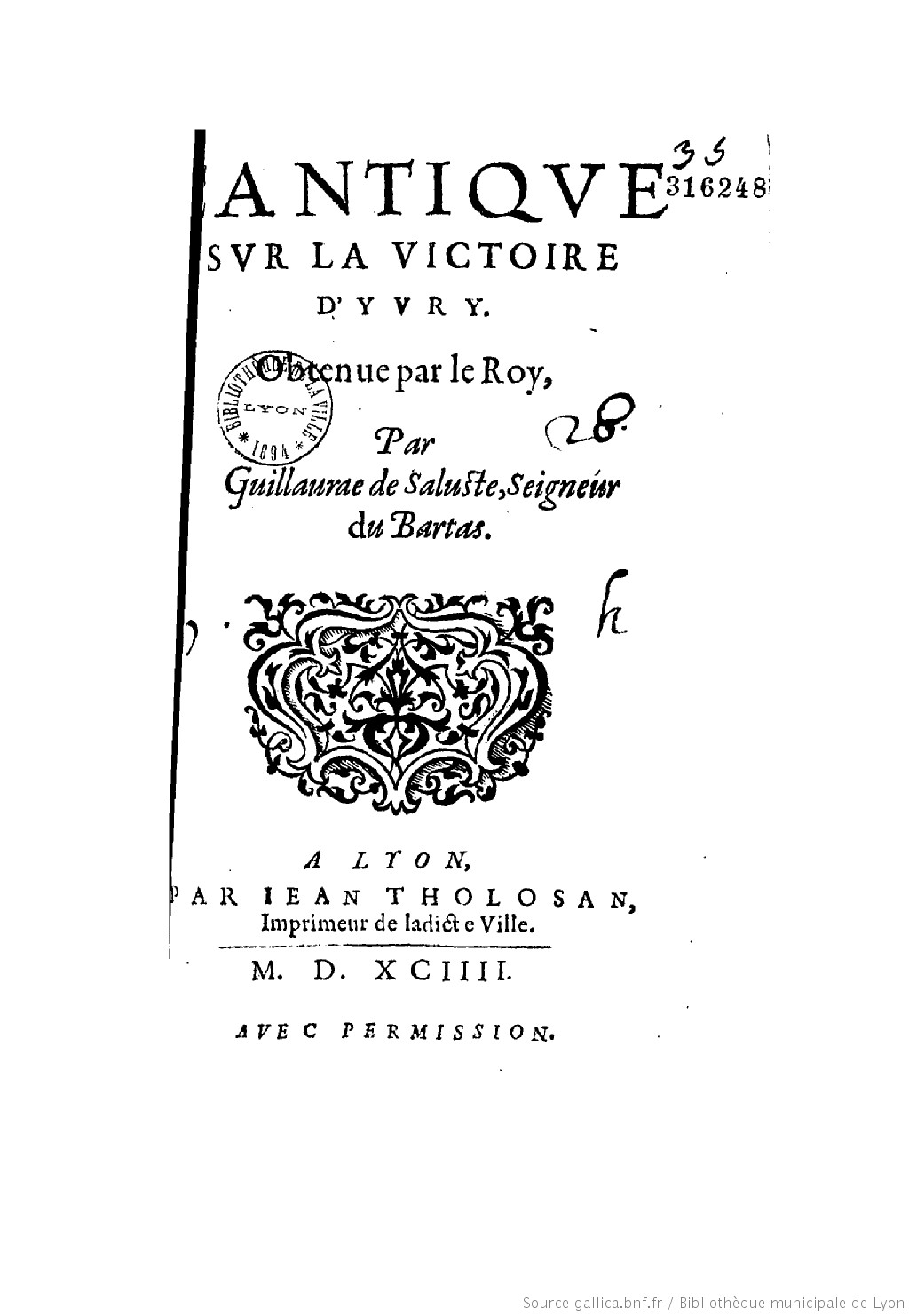
Gascon poet Guillaume de Saluste du Bartas composed the Cantique sur la victoire d'Yvry in 1590 (right, title page of a reprint published in Lyon, 1594).

"A horrible panache

Shades his salad and seems a shrub

Which, by low esmondé, croist le long d'un ruisseau.

As soon as Heaven wraths against it,

From its undulating head, the green tuft grows

Or up, or down; and floats, serf of the wind

Right hand, left hand, backward, forward."

Beyond the poetry, the king wanted to be highly recognizable to demonstrate his bravery and galvanize his troops, whose courage depended in part on the sovereign's physical presence on the battlefield. At Ivry, Henri IV didn't hesitate to put himself in harm's way, charging to the front of his cavalry, surrounded by the Grands, and finding himself in a furious melee. His physical courage is undeniable and astonishing, given that, since John the Good, the king is no longer at the head of his troops in battle. The necessities of civil war can also explain it.

In the confusion of battle, the plume is a rallying point, helping to regroup and avoid dispersion. This happened during the war of Ivry: Henri Pot de Rhodes, who was wearing the royal Cornette, was seriously wounded, and Henri IV's plume served as a sign, a point of attraction for the royal army. The white Cornette, a triangular flame, normally marks the presence of the king or his representative in battle. Following Henri IV's white plume, the cavalry made a victorious breakthrough. His order to "rally to my white plume" proved an effective means of controlling his squadrons.

=== Emblem of King Henri IV ===
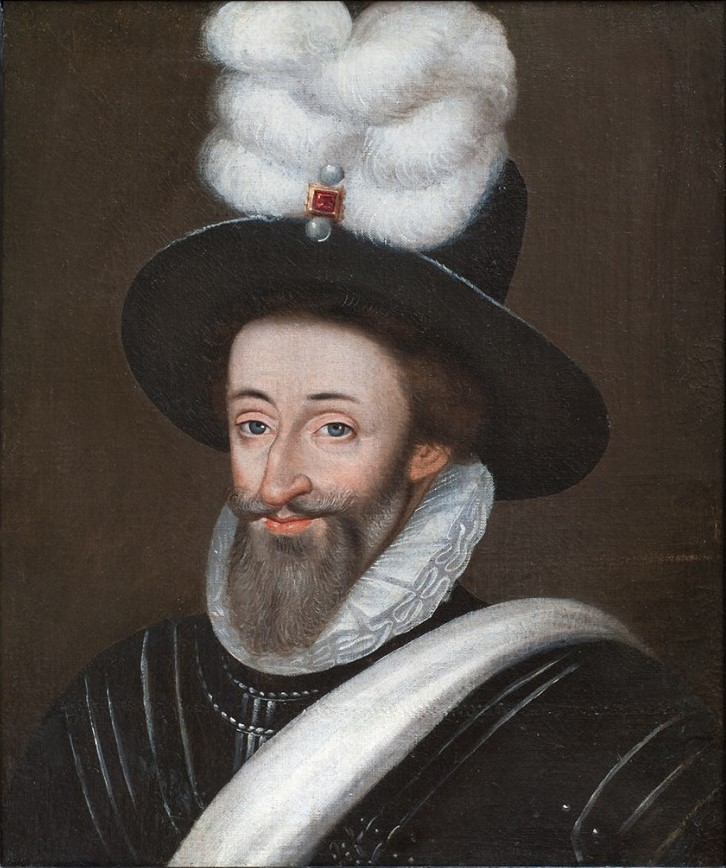
Henri IV wearing his headdress adorned with a white plume and his white scarf slung over his shoulder, oil on canvas, 17th century.

A member of the Académie de Nérac, du Bartas was a lifelong servant of the court of Navarre and the future Henri IV. In his poem, he emphasizes the celebration of the victory of a truly Christian king, guaranteeing peace and cohesion in the face of the disorders represented by the League. The king's clemency on the battlefield is also a sign of his divine election. In this way, we can see that the qualities attributed to Henri IV by later centuries were established as early as the victory at Ivry.

In the Wars of Religion context, the white plume was an emblem that united both Catholics, who rallied to Henri IV because they considered him the legitimate sovereign, and Protestants, who supported their co-religionist. The former used the white French cross, the latter the white scarf. Henri IV, who also wore the white scarf, wore, along with the white plume, a badge uniquely linked to his person, embodying the union between Catholics and Protestants.

More precisely, it's because it's a badge with little meaning, apart from its aristocratic dimension, that the white plume can be chosen as an emblem. The white scarf, a Protestant symbol, became a badge attached to the person of Henri IV. However, its Protestant origin, following Henry IV's conversion to Catholicism, became a source of embarrassment. Royal narrators and propagandists therefore put more emphasis on the plume. The motifs of Henri IV's helmet and white plume were taken up as emblems attached to his person when Lyon submitted to the king's authority in 1594 or during royal entries into cities, as in Avignon in 1600.

The color white appears to be an instrument of national unification, particularly in the face of the red worn by the Spaniards. It was also an instrument in the process of sacred recharging of the royal person, through the heroization of Henri IV. Indeed, the white associated with the king symbolizes the Good.

Some ten years after the assassination of Henri IV, his widow, Marie de Médicis, commissioned Rubens to paint a series of pictures for the Galerie Médicis in the Palais du Luxembourg in Paris. One of them, included in the cycle of Henri IV's life, is dedicated to the battle of Ivry. Entitled Henri IV à la bataille d'Ivry (Henri IV at the Battle of Ivry), it shows the king in the middle of the fray, sword in hand and wearing his white plume, which already seemed inevitable in the iconographic representation of this battle.

Henri IV at the Battle of Ivry, paintings by Pierre Paul Rubens

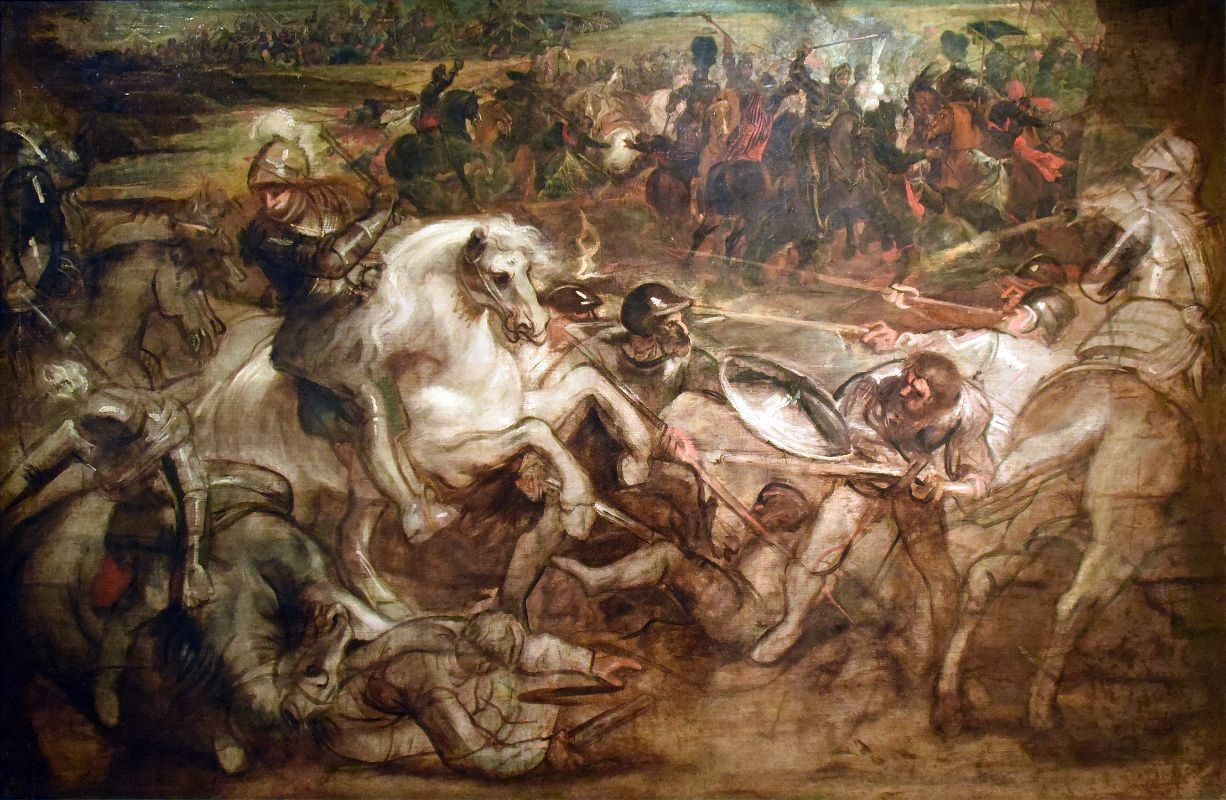
Oil on canvas, circa 1624-1626, Antwerp, House of Rubens.

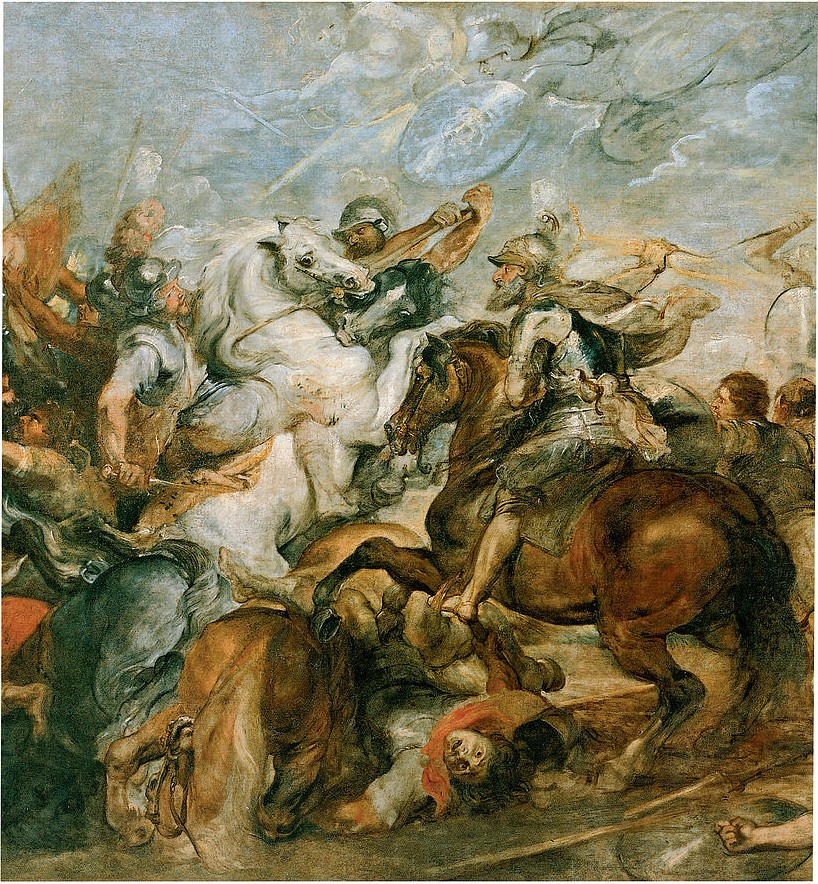
Oil on canvas, circa 1627-1630, Florence, Uffizi Gallery.

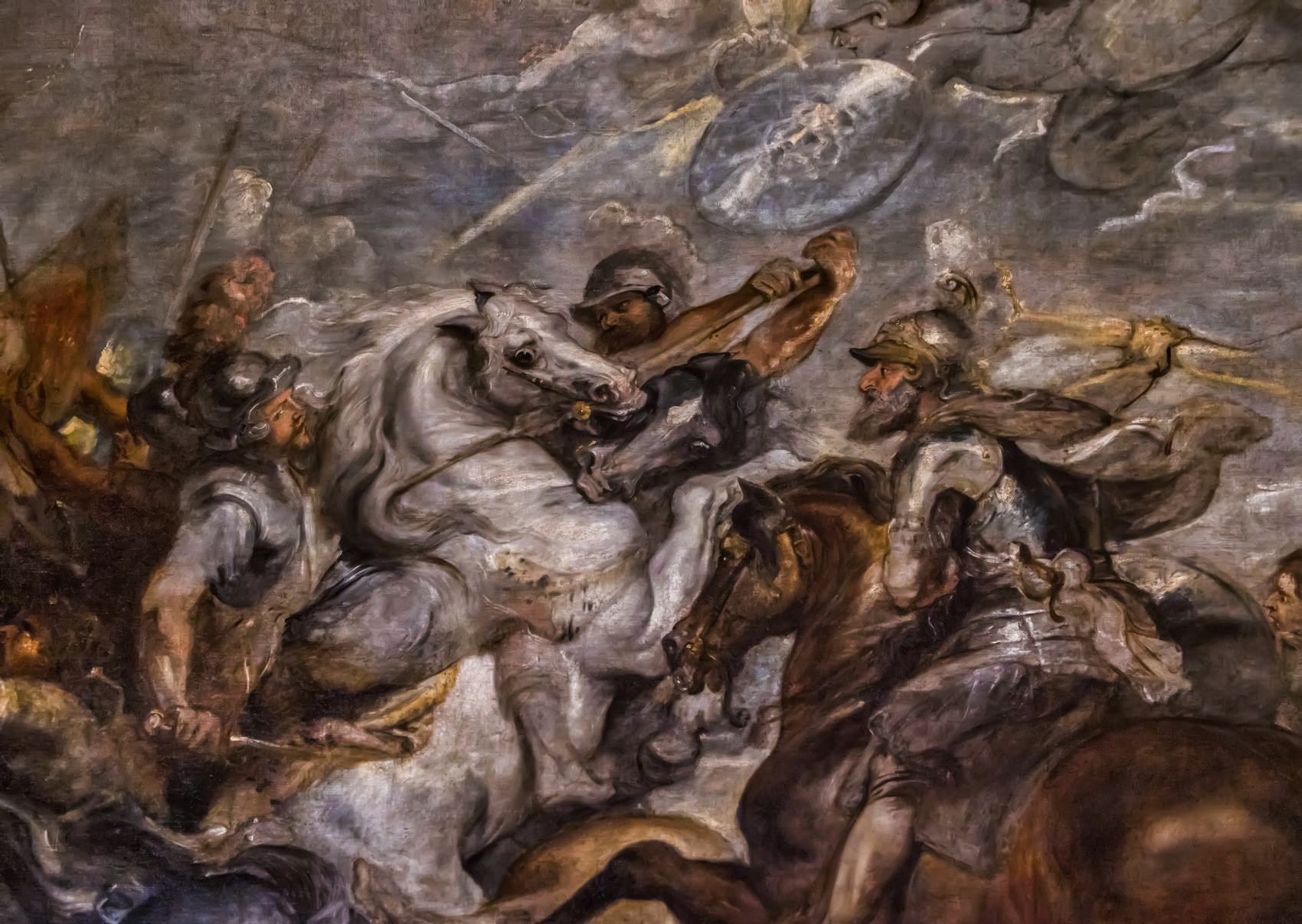
Detail of the painting on display at the Uffizi Gallery.

== "Rally to my white plume" ==
=== The birth of a formula ===
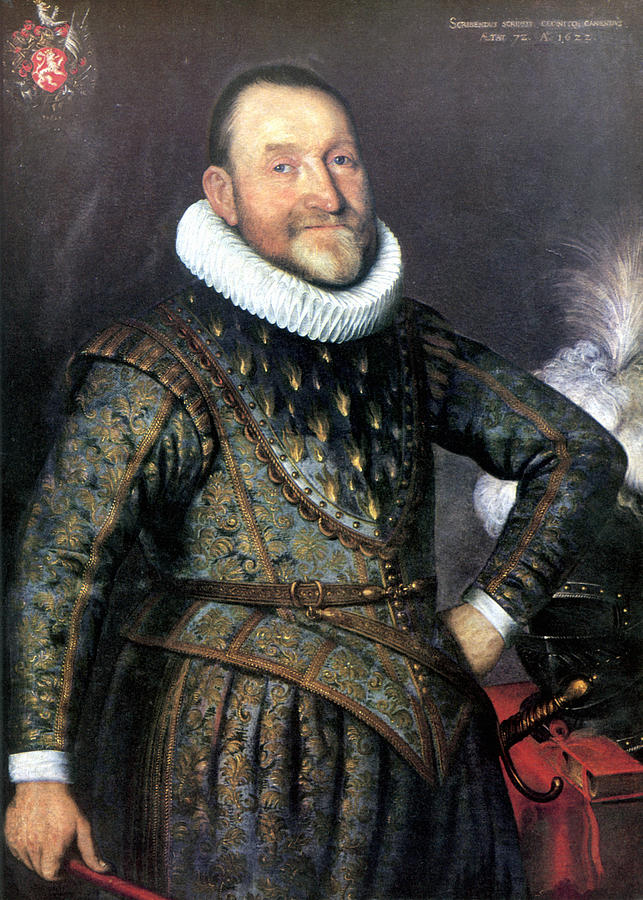
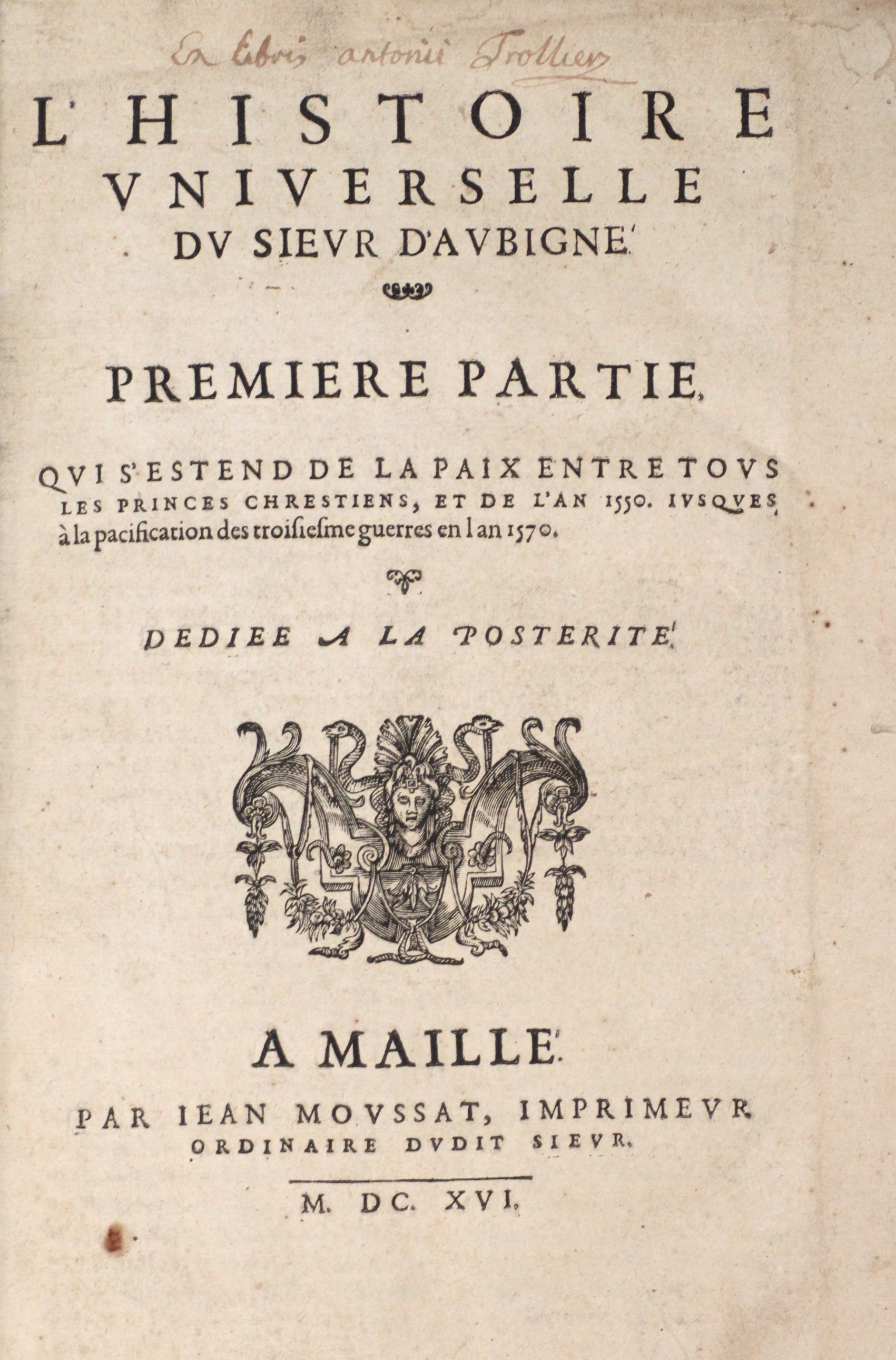
Huguenot warrior and writer Théodore Agrippa d'Aubigné offers a literary version of the royal formula in his Histoire universelle (right, title page of an original edition, 1616).

According to immediate accounts of the battle, Henri IV encouraged his troops before battle, speaking of honor, victory, and rallying. At the king's burial in 1610, the Franciscan Jacques Suarès delivered his funeral oration. In it, he recalls the battle of Ivry and describes Henri IV "putting a white plume in his headdress and saying to the nobility around him: here is this feather which will serve you today as a guidon, following which we will triumph over our enemies".

In his Histoire universelle, written between 1595 and 1616 and published from 1616 to 1620, the Protestant writer Agrippa d'Aubigné, a former comrade-in-arms of Henri IV, gave a literary version of this speech, which became very famous:

"Mes compagnons, Dieu est pour nous, voici ses ennemis et les nostres, voici vos Roi: à eux. If you miss your horns, go to my white plume, you'll find it on the road to victory and honor."

An immaculate attribute prefiguring victory and the comforting word of the king is thus associated on the battlefield, while the feather continues to be a court ornament of prime importance.

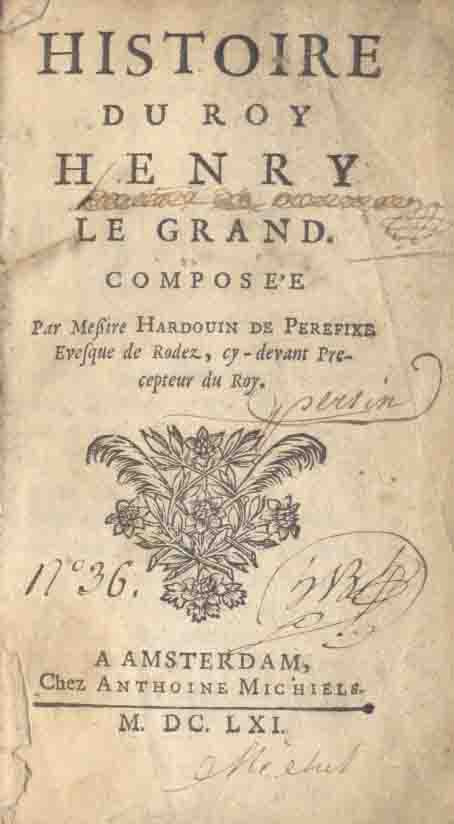
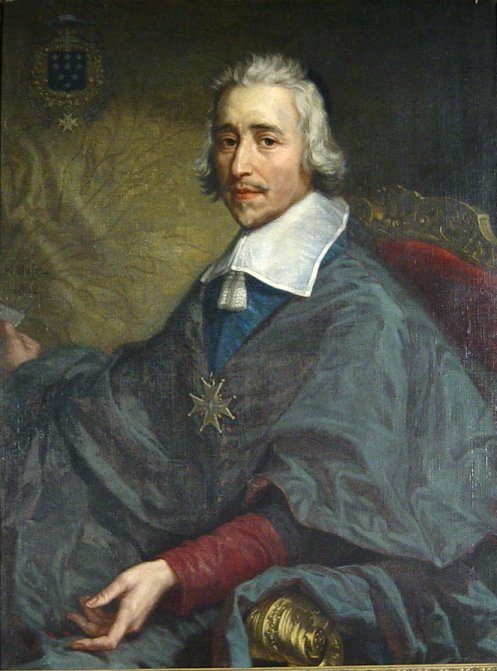
Title page of Histoire du roy Henry le Grand (1661) by Hardouin de Péréfixe.

In 1661, in his Histoire du roy Henri le Grand, Hardouin de Péréfixe, former preceptor to Louis XIV, added a decisive element to the phrase to establish the white plume in the long term: "You will always find it on the path to victory and honor", whereas the earliest accounts describe more of an occasional speech by Henri IV, focusing on the battle to come. This formula, like others, has the merit of effectively simplifying a complex situation.

Historian François Lavie points out that Péréfixe's book is the culmination of a practice of compiling the king's bon mots and formulas that began as early as the reign of Henri IV. According to Michel Magnien, a specialist in Renaissance literature, this work represents a turning point in the legend of Henri IV: from the image of an ideal Christian king, we move on to that of a gallant king who loves bon mots. Other elements such as the hen in the pot, were also established.

=== Formula and purpose ===
In 1713, Jesuit Father Gabriel Daniel retained Péréfixe's addition, linked the two elements by describing the king pointing to the plume on his helmet, and slightly modified the meaning of the phrase: "Enfants, si les cornettes vous manquent [etc.] vous le trouver toujours [...]". The white plume is now referred to twice in the same formula, by word and gesture, while Henri IV is definitively assimilated as a father of the people.

In 1728, Voltaire published the highly successful La Henriade. It was part of a new movement devoted to different episodes in national history. In La Henriade, Voltaire adds another dimension to Henri IV's speech. By having him say: "You were born French, and I am your king / These are our enemies, march and follow me", he completely disguises the fact that the battle of Ivry was an episode in a civil war, pitting French against other French. It was in the 1770 edition that the event of the battle of Ivry was first depicted: the engraving, by Charles Eisen, shows a speech by the king before the battle, pointing to the enemy. Henri IV, wearing an extravagant plume, appears as the great man at the head of his troops. His gestures and rousing words make him a hero who personifies the destiny of France.

From the mid-18th century onwards, dictionaries such as L'Encyclopédie and the Dictionnaire de Trévoux mentioned the battle of Ivry in the article for the word "panache", which was not the case in the previous century. Beyond the word, the very purpose of the white plume can be found in Barnabé Farmian Durosoy's lyric drama Henri IV ou la Bataille d'Ivry, first performed at the Hôtel de Bourgogne theater in Paris in 1774: the Marquise de Lenoncourt presents it to the king before the battle. This scene is depicted on a printed armchair back by Jean-Baptiste André Gautier-Dagoty.

During the Revolution, Henri IV, depicted with his plume, was likened by royalist propaganda to a "French Perseus", who came to save Andromeda, symbolizing France, from a sea monster. It's a reworking of a 16th-century motif. In 1800, a local scholar, Abbé H. M. Garnesson, parish priest of Chavot-Courcourt, asserted that the Maréchal de Biron, killed by a cannonball at the siege of Épernay in 1592, had been targeted instead of the sovereign because he had worn the royal plume for fun. In reality, Henri IV was not present at the time of his death. Nevertheless, this apocryphal anecdote, which has been repeated to this day, shows that in the early 19th century, the white plume was seen as an emblem specific to Henri IV, directly linked to his person, without being a political sign.

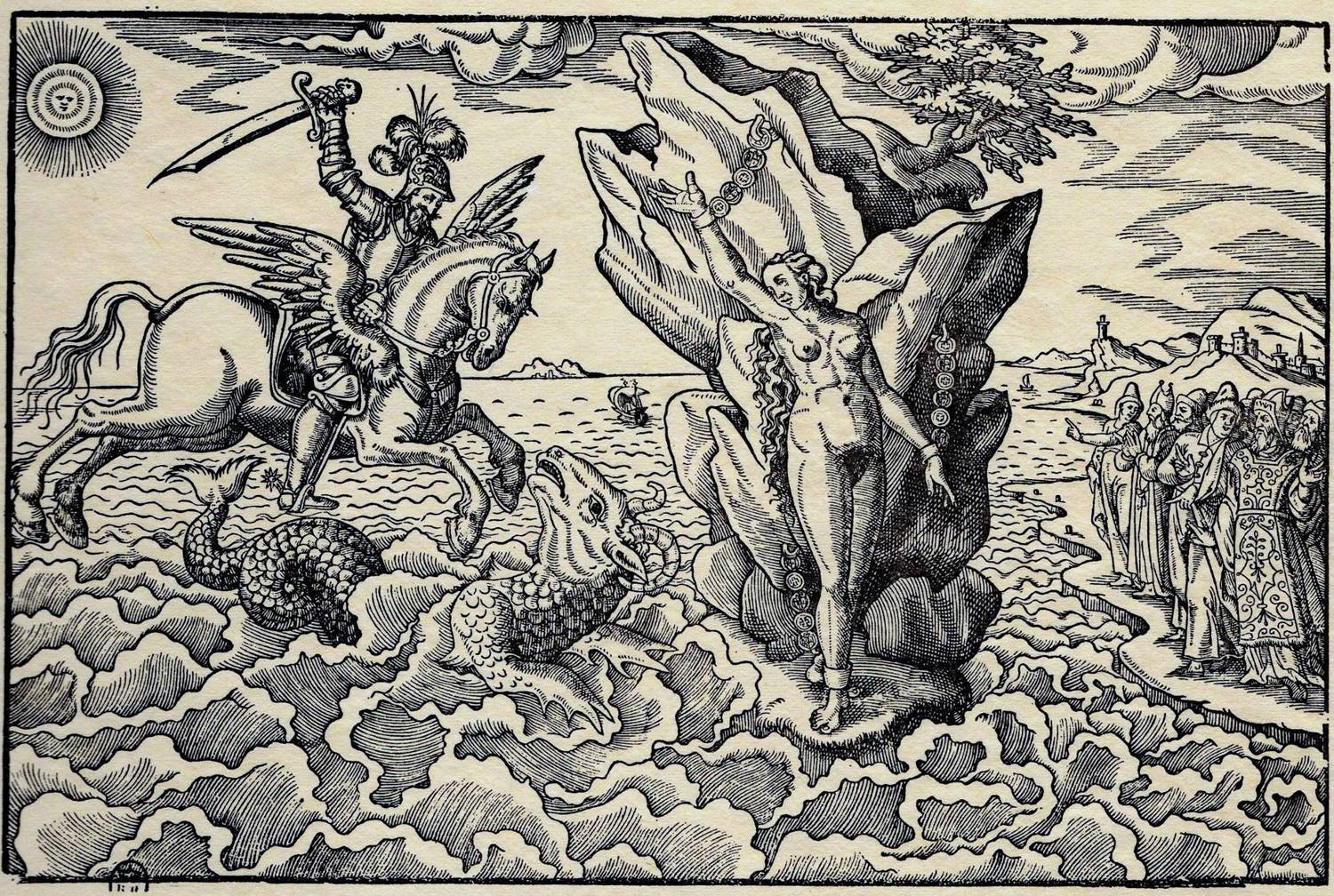
Henri IV, new Perseus, delivering France-Andromeda. Wood engraving illustrating the placard La délivrance de la France par le Persée françois, 1594.

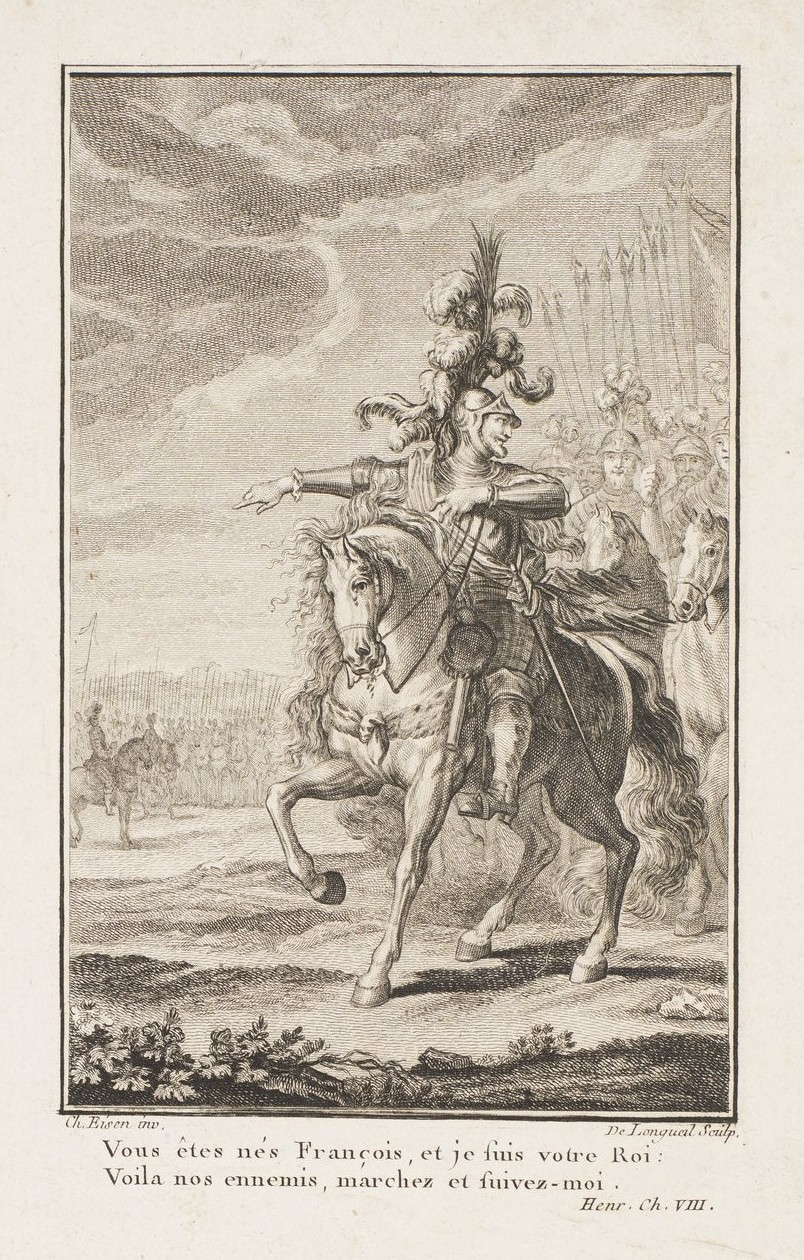
Engraving by Charles Eisen illustrating Chant VIII of Voltaire's La Henriade, 1770 edition.

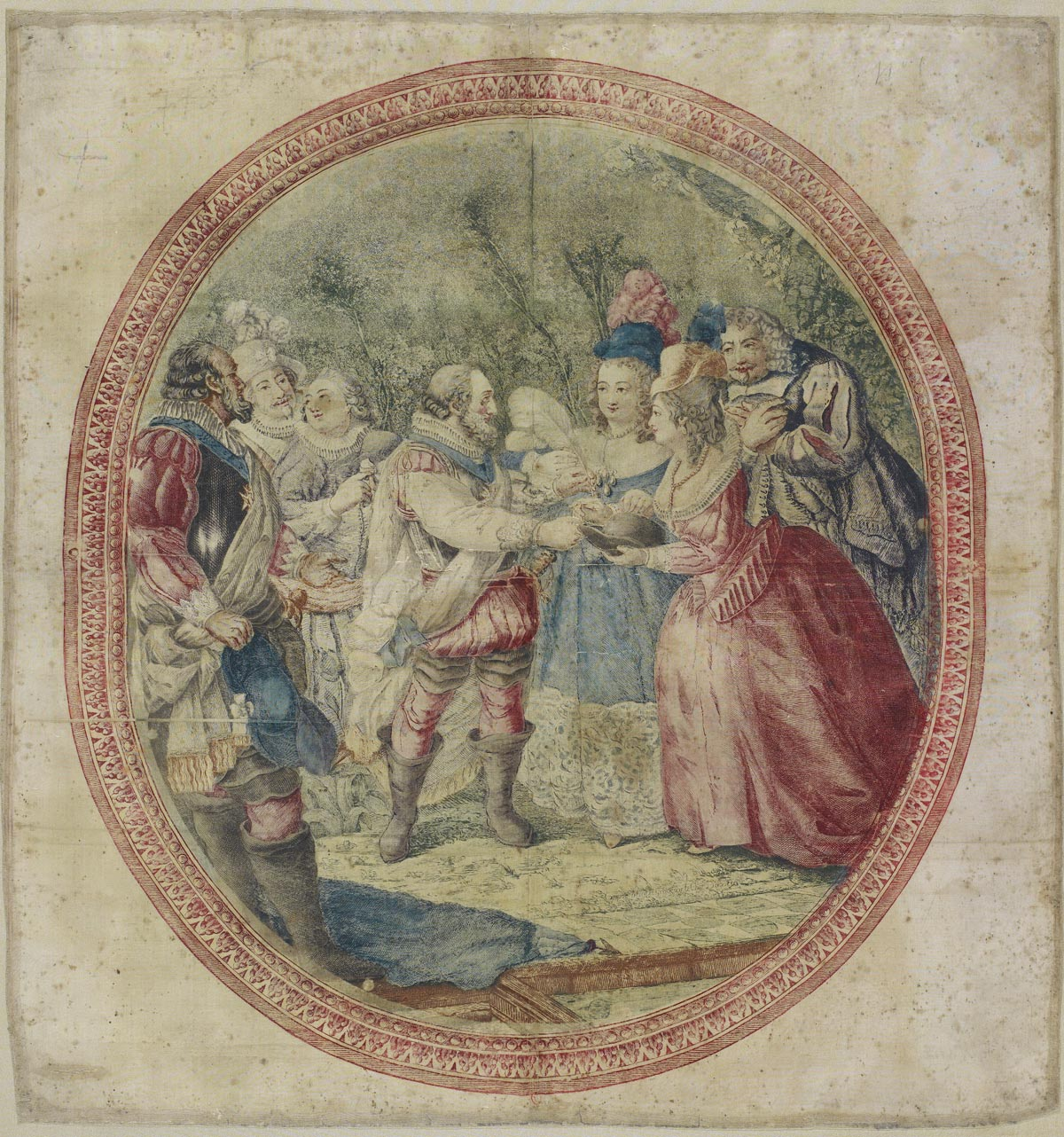
The Marquise de Lenoncourt presenting the white plume to the King before the Battle of Ivry, 1782.

== From royalism to legitimism ==
=== Royalist symbol during the Restoration ===
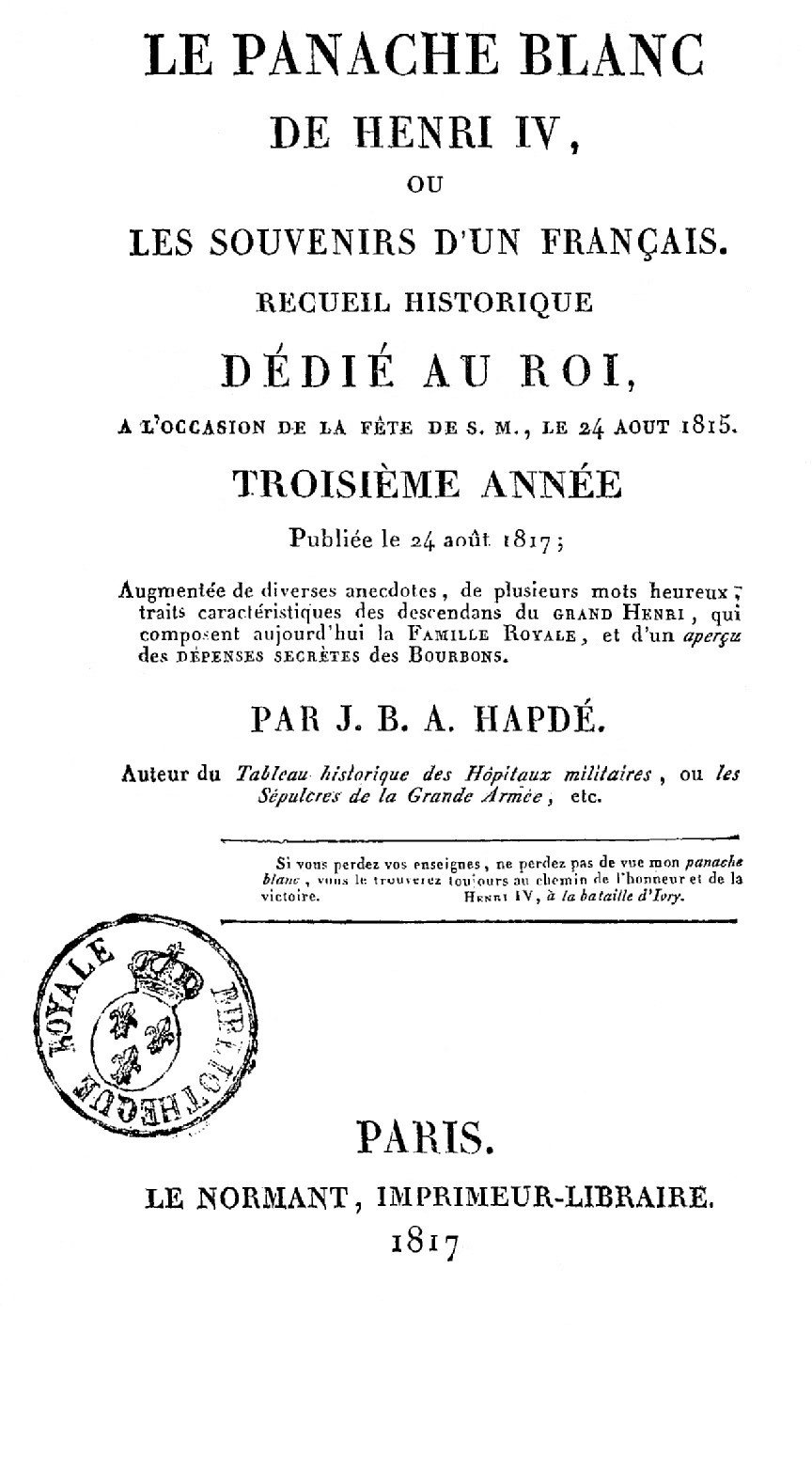
Title page of Jean-Baptiste Augustin Hapdé's Le Panache blanc de Henri IV, ou les Souvenirs d'un Français, 1817.

With the Restoration, the figure of Henri IV and the rallying to his white plume took on a new meaning. Louis XVIII became another Henri IV, embodying an ideal of French reconciliation after a long civil war, the Wars of Religion. These qualities had to be transferred to Louis XVIII, who also had to appease and reconcile after the Revolution and the Empire. The task was not an easy one, as the images conveyed by the two monarchs clashed: a dashing cavalryman versus a fat character returning from abroad in the back of his carriage. In mid-March 1815, just after Napoleon's return from Elba, the royalist press evoked Henri IV's white plume to hold back - unsuccessfully - the soldiers who were in danger of rallying to the deposed emperor. At that very moment, Henri IV's past glory was no match for Napoleon's present one.

Nevertheless, of all the Restoration's attempts at royalist symbolism, the figure of Henri IV, presented as an amiable and courageous king, was probably one of the most successful. The images produced at the time used the white plume as the emblem of Henri IV, the organizer of the reconciliation of the French, in opposition to Napoleon, seen as an heir to Robespierre. According to some royalists, Henri IV's plume symbolizes the victories of the kings of France at Fleurus, which they contrast with Waterloo, the shameful defeat of the usurper Napoleon. Henri IV is regularly associated with official celebrations, as the embodiment of future prosperity. In 1816, for the fête de la Saint-Louis (August 25), in the village of Tauves, Puy-de-Dôme, the bust of King Louis XVIII was carried on a stretcher by men "wearing Henri IV-style hats with a bouquet of lilies ".

That same year, 1816, Jean-Baptiste Augustin Hapdé, a former Empire thurifer who had rallied to the Bourbons, published a work with an eloquent title: Le Panache blanc de Henri IV, ou les Souvenirs d'un Français. The following year, the king's gesture of displaying his plume at the head of his troops before the battle was used in an illustration by Alexandre-Joseph Desenne for a reprint of La Henriade.

While the statue of Henri IV on Paris's Pont-Neuf was being rebuilt, the popularity of Henri IV and his white plume was also reflected in the decorative arts at this time: tapestries, porcelain, furniture, etc. The king's outstretched finger towards his plume is at the center of a sketch by porcelain painter Jean-Charles Develly.

Rallying to the white plume was no longer a battle grouping, but a movement of political support for the Bourbon monarchy. The white plume reinforced the use of the white flag in place of the tricolor. Engraved images of Henri IV wearing his white plume, replacing the white flag, an invention of the Counter-Revolution and the Restoration. The white plume legitimized the use of the color white, giving it historical depth. Indeed, under the Ancien Régime, the white flag was merely the ensign of the Navy and not the flag of the monarchy. By using the figure of Henri IV, royalist propaganda sought to make white an ancient national color, at a time of intense rivalry with the tricolor flag.

Instrumentalizing the myth of Henri IV under the Restoration and the July Monarchy

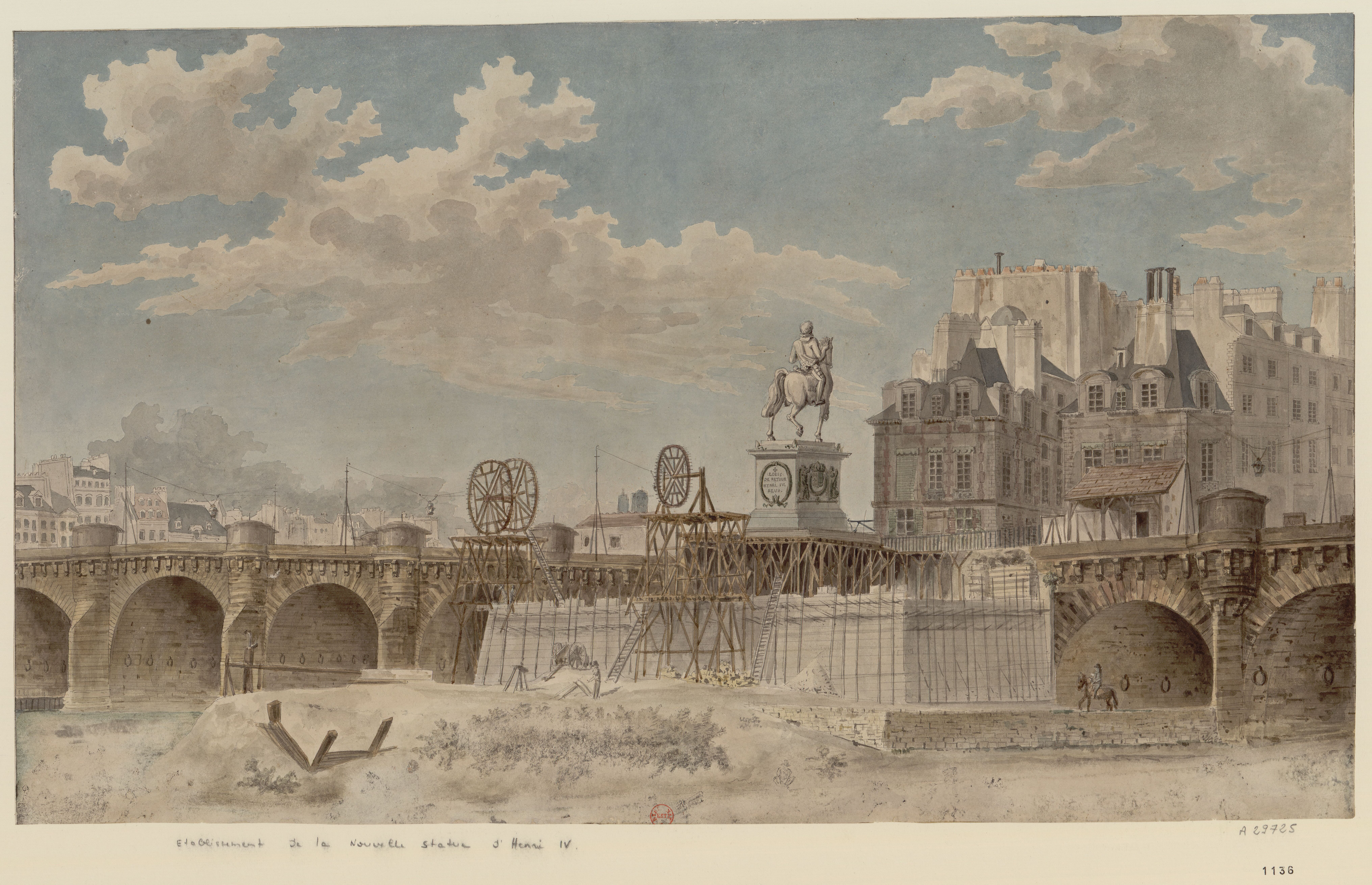
Establishment of the new statue of Henri IV, drawing published in 1818.

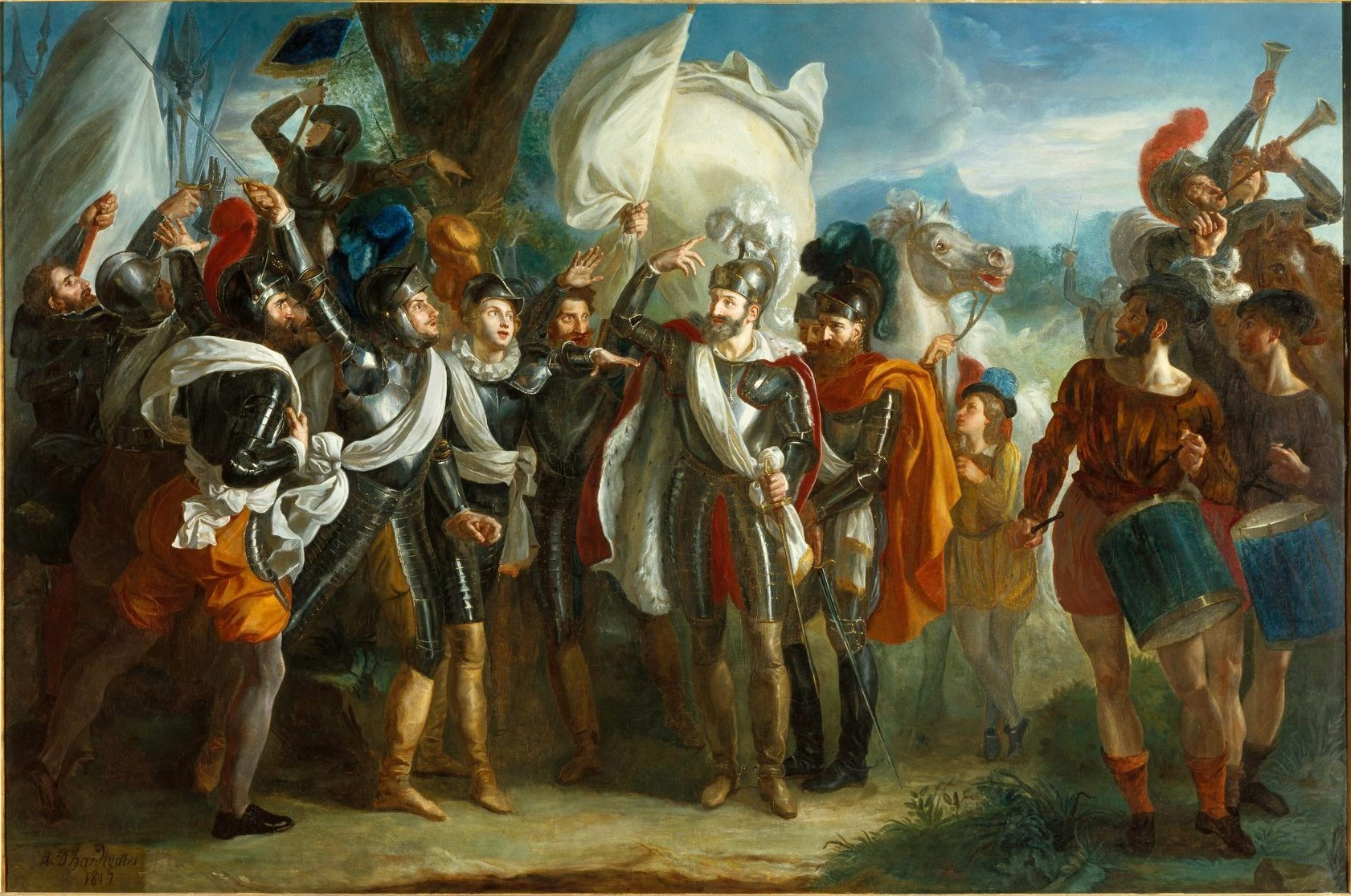
The Battle of Ivry. Oil on canvas by Charles Achille d'Hardiviller, 1817, Château de Sully-sur-Loire.

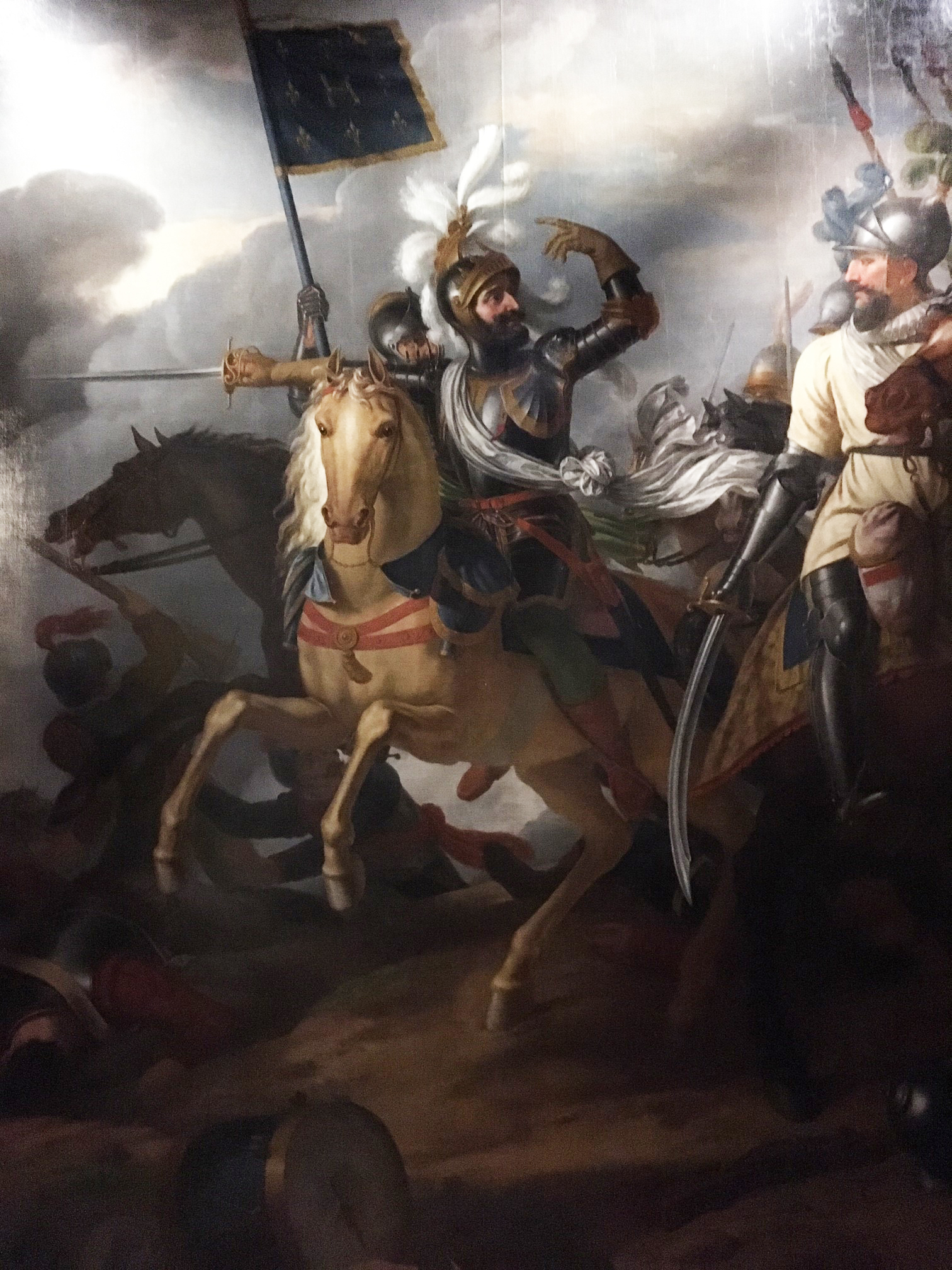
Henri IV on the morning of the Battle of Ivry. Oil on canvas by Jean-Charles Tardieu, 1824, Château de Pau.

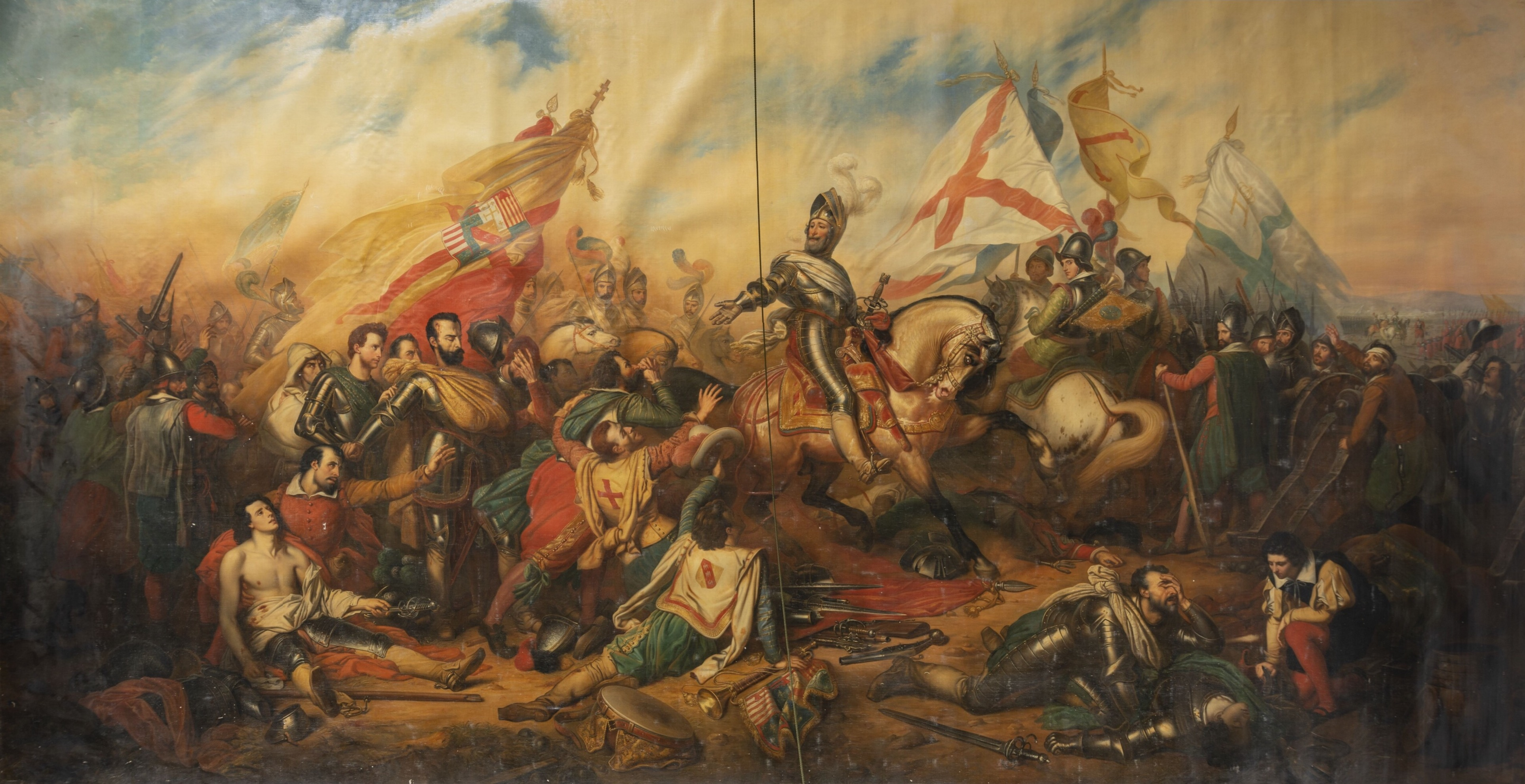
Henri IV at the Battle of Ivry. Oil on canvas by Charles de Steuben, circa 1838-1842, Château de Versailles.

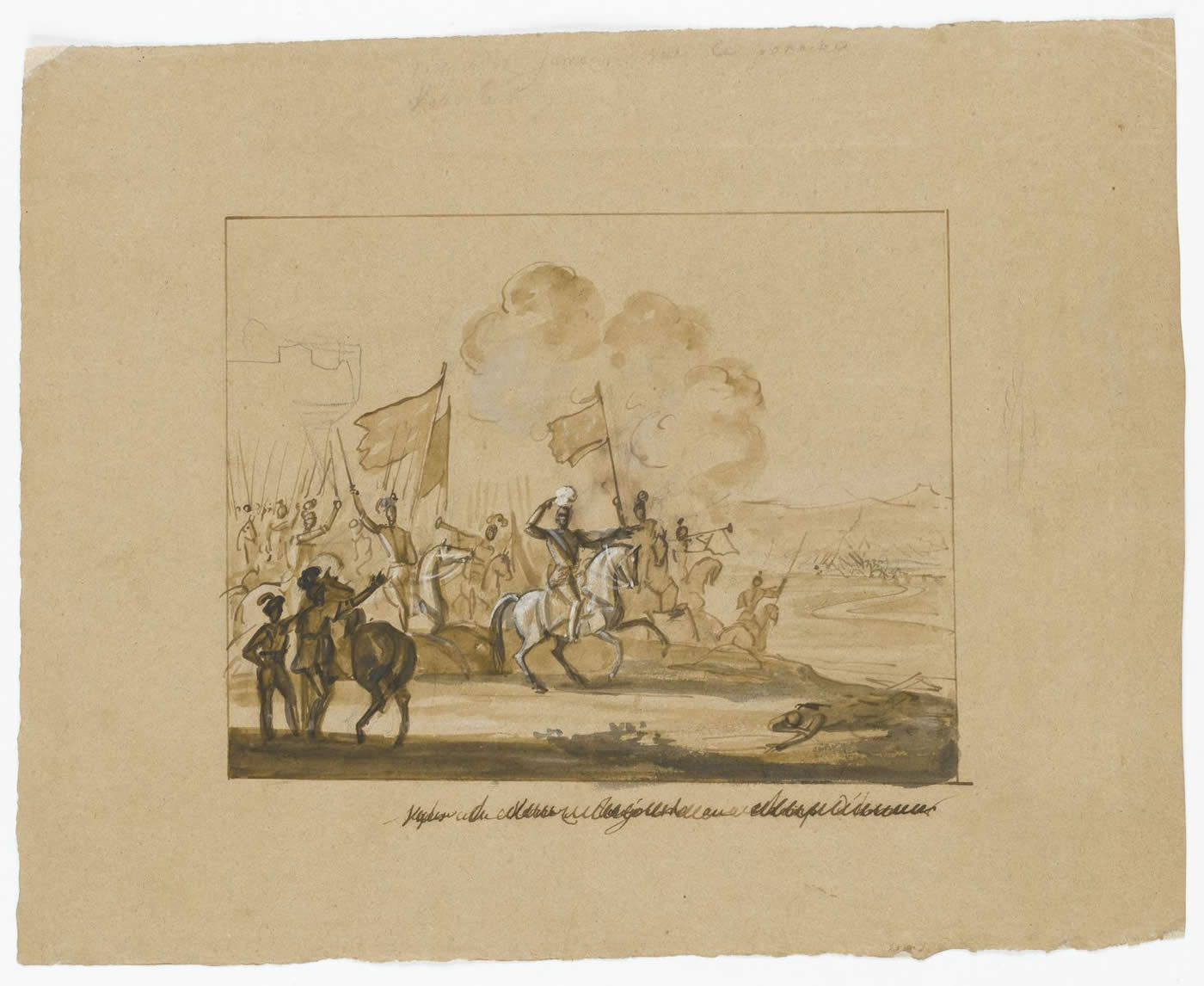
Henri IV at the Battle of Ivry, showing his white plume.Drawing by Jean-Charles Develly, Château de Pau.

=== Legitimist symbol ===
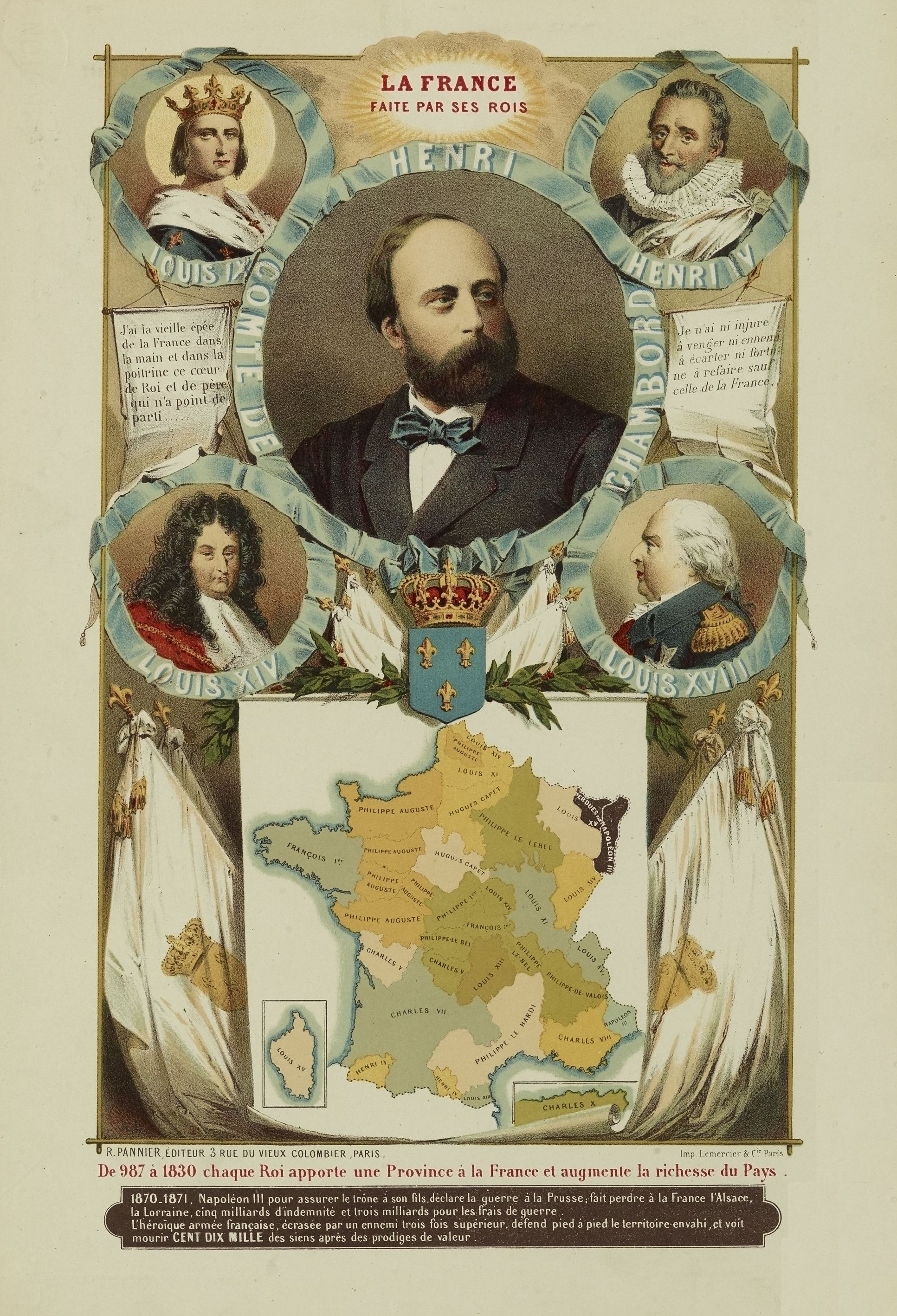
Legitimist poster extolling dynastic continuity between the Count of Chambord and the kings of France, including Henri IV.

Under the July monarchy and subsequent regimes, these depictions of Henri IV were less numerous, because the tricolor flag was once again in use, but its white plume continued to symbolize the legitimist movement. It also became a hackneyed commonplace. Gustave Flaubert, for example, in a letter of 1852, turned it into a repulsor: "All this is as silly, worn-out and empty as Henri IV's white plume".

Legitimists relied not only on the color white but also on the formula. Henri IV was seen as a model to be proposed to the pretender to the throne of France under the name of Henri V, the Comte de Chambord. In 1852, for example, Comte de Falloux wanted the pretender to pronounce "some happy words in the manner of Henri IV".

In 1870-1873, the Legitimists continued to use the figure of Henri IV in their project to restore the monarchy. In October 1873, the Comte de Chambord, whose rejection of the tricolor flag led to the failure of this attempt, declared: "My white flag will always lead you to the path of honor and victory. He thus repeated the formula attributed to Henri IV, with the flag replacing the panache. He insisted on continuity: "Henri V cannot abandon the white flag of Henri IV ". The white flag is considered by the Legitimists to be Henri IV's flag: this historically false shortcut makes it possible to evoke the color white directly, without having to concern oneself with the panache.

After the failure of the Legitimist enterprise, the color white came to unite all supporters of the monarchy, including Orleanists. In Provence, in the arrondissement of Arles, a royalist circle went by the name of "Panache blanc".

== From national symbol to folklore ==
=== Inclusion in the educational and republican pantheon ===
By the last decade of the Second Empire, and especially under the Third Republic, the figure of Henri IV and his white plume was once again very much in evidence. This revival can be linked to the development of school education, from Victor Duruy to Jules Ferry, which increased the number of history textbooks for children, featuring numerous images. The battle of Ivry and the white plume were thus inserted into a series of images building a common memory.

In the 1880s, a modernized version of the formula was included in the official middle-school curriculum: "Soldiers, if you lose your ensigns, rally to my white plume". In 1912, Ernest Lavisse was able to propose Henri IV's white plume as a symbol of courage to the schoolchildren of Le Nouvion-en-Thiérache during a prize-giving speech, without needing to explain the circumstances.

The defeat of 1870 was a traumatic event for the nation, leading to a rethinking of the idea of the French nation. In the eyes of public opinion, Henri IV became a patriot, a king who defended France. By the end of the 19th century, he was one of the national heroes portrayed in epinal images. He was one of the three most represented figures in textbooks and popular history books. The Ivry episode loses its character of civil war and becomes part of the republican pantheon of founding moments of the nation.

Rallying to the white plume is presented as a kind of constant since Vercingétorix, and Henri IV is seen as one of the country's "saviors". It is part of a continuous narrative in which a succession of heroes supposedly personify French continuity, each linked to a gesture or a word.

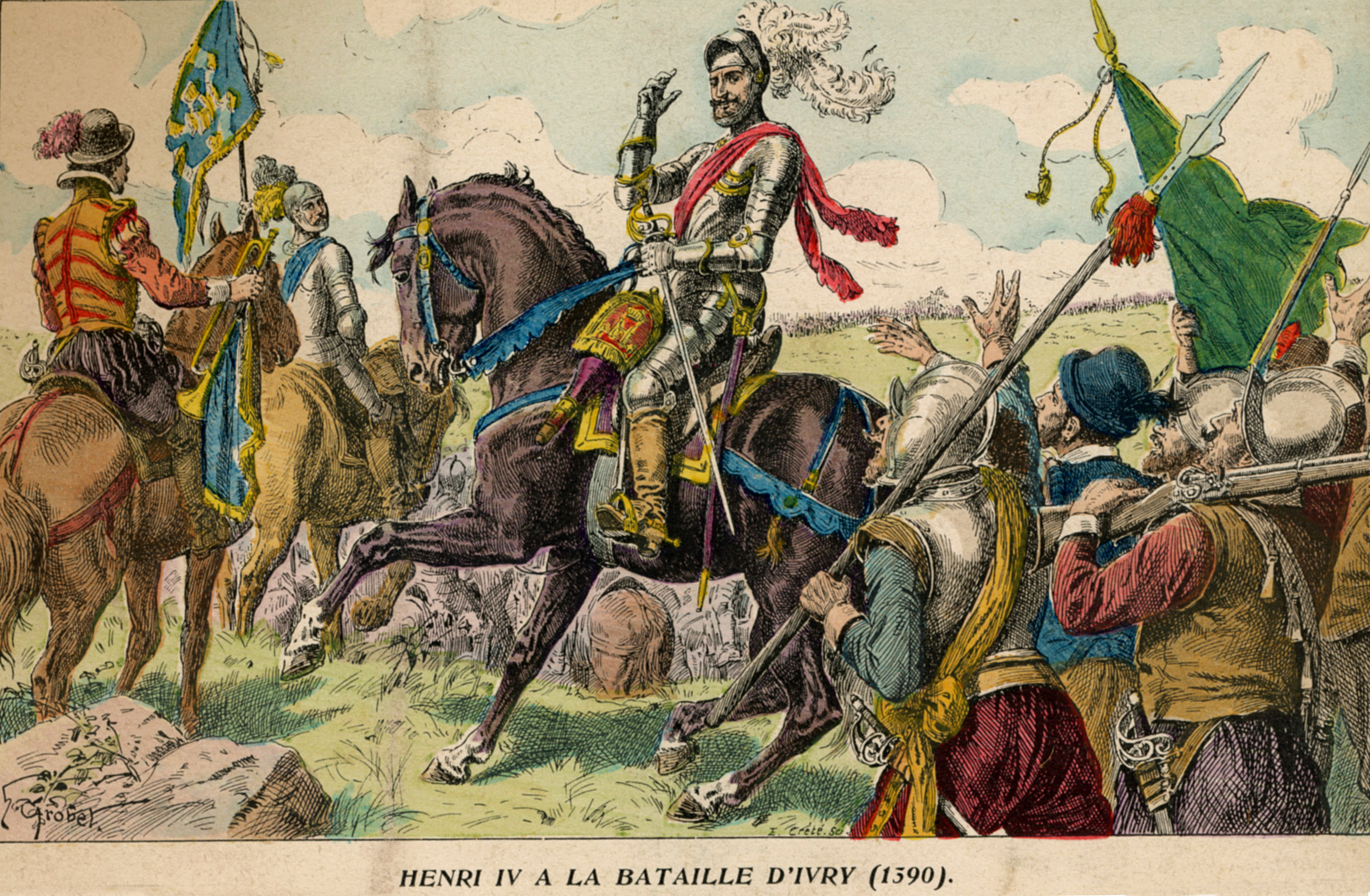
Henri IV at the battle of Ivry (1590). Color lithograph by E. Crété after H. Grobet, Histoire de France, Paris, Guérin, 1902.

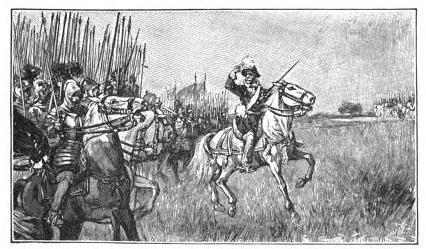
Henri IV at the Battle of Ivry. Illustration from Histoire de France, cours élémentaire, Ernest Lavisse, Armand Colin, 1913, p. 107

=== Popular attribute of Henri IV ===
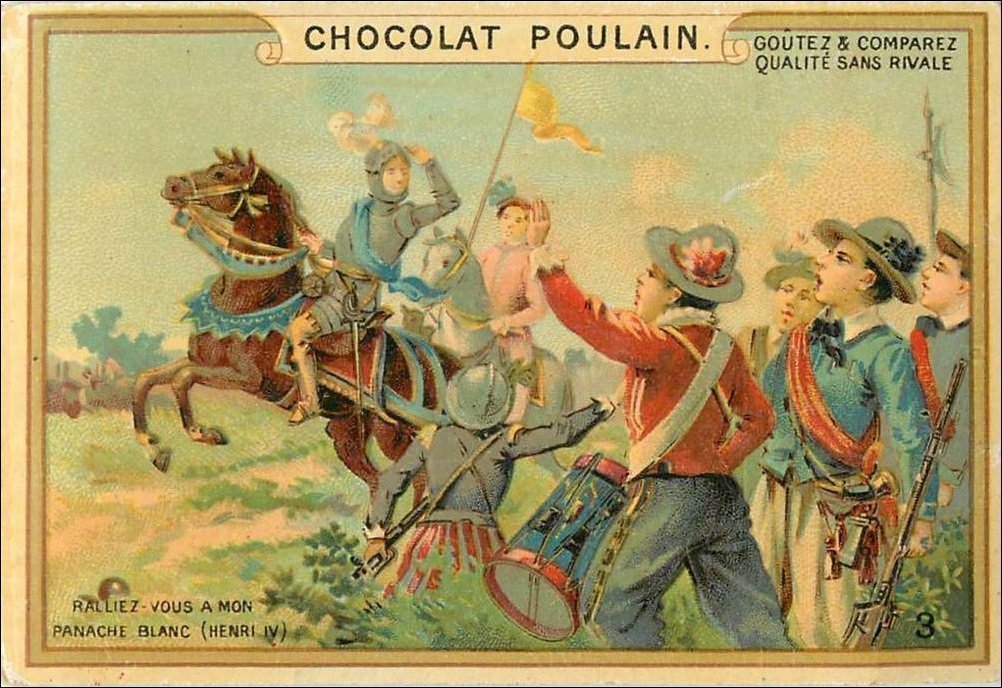
“Ralliez-vous à mon panache blanc” (Rally to my white plume), chromolithographic advertisement for Poulain chocolate.

From the representations of the Third Republic onwards, Henri IV is presented as a reassuring leader, whose panache we follow. Royalist political symbols, such as the fleurs de lys, and elements associated with the violence no longer appear. As conflicts over the white flag fade, Henri IV's white plume becomes one of the folkloric attributes attached to him, like the chicken in the pot. It now symbolizes only chivalric bravery.

In 1969, in his Rubrique à brac published in Pilote magazine, cartoonist Marcel Gotlib hijacked the story of the white plume, which becomes, in three vignettes, a subterfuge used by the king to send someone to be killed in his place. Thirty years later, writer Michel Peyramaure entitled one of his historical novels about Henri IV Ralliez-vous à mon panache blanc. In this novel, featuring Agrippa d'Aubigné, the writer maintains the legend of a king full of panache.

During the 2007 presidential election campaign, candidate François Bayrou, a Béarnais like Henri IV, called on the French to rally behind his white plume. Through its successive metamorphoses, the plume has become an enduring icon of French political life, while the formula is famous enough to appear in compilations aimed at the general public. The white plume is now part of what historian Laurent Avezou calls Henri IV's "album d'images d'Épinal ".

== See also ==
- Henry IV of France
- Battle of Ivry
- Agrippa d'Aubigné
- Hardouin de Péréfixe de Beaumont
- Guillaume de Salluste Du Bartas

== Bibliography ==
- Turrel, Denise (2008). « L'invention d'un signe politique: le panache blanc d'Henri IV », dans Denise Turrel, Martin Aurell, Christine Manigand, Jérôme Grévy, Laurent Hablot et Catalina Girbea (dir.) Signes et couleurs des identités politiques du Moyen Âge à nos jours. Rennes: Presses universitaires de Rennes (published 537). pp. 437–458. ISBN 978-2-7535-0641-1.
- Mironneau, Paul (1998). "Aux sources de la légende d'Henri IV: le Cantique de la Bataille d'Ivry de Guillaume de Salluste du Bartas". Cahiers d'Aubigné. 9 (1). Albineana: 111–127. doi:10.3406/albin.1998.1391. ISSN 1154-5852.
- Discours véritable de la victoire obtenue par le roy en la bataille donnée près le village d'Evry. Tours, Jamet Métayer. 1590.
- de Saluste du Bartas, Guillaume (1590). Cantique sur la victoire obtenue par le Roy, le quatorziesme de mars 1590, à Yvry, par G. de Saluste, seigneur du Bartas, Tours.
- Suares de Sainte-Marie, Jacques (1610). Sermon funèbre, fait aux obseques de Henri IIII. Roy de France & de Navarre, le 22 de juin 1610, dans l'église de S. Jacques de la Boucherie. Lyon: Nicolas Jullieron.
- d'Aubigné, Agrippa. Histoire universelle, t. 8: 1588-1593. Paris: Renouard.
- Hardouin de Péréfixe de Beaumont, Histoire du roy Henri-le-Grand. Amsterdam: Chez Louys & Daniel Elzevier. 1661.
- Daniel, P. Gabriel (1713). Histoire de France depuis l'établissement de la monarchie françoise dans les Gaules. Paris.
- Voltaire, La Henriade: poème, avec les notes et variantes, suivi de l'Essai sur la poésie épique. Paris: A. Égron. 1816.
- Barnabé Farmian Durosoy, Henri IV ou la Bataille d'Ivry: Drame lyrique en trois actes et en prose. Paris: Didot. 1777.
- Augustin Hapdé, Jean-Baptiste (1815). Le panache blanc de Henri IV, ou Les souvenirs d'un français. Recueil historique contenant un précis de la vie du héros, diverses anecdotes, plusieurs des mots heureux et des traits caractéristiques des illustres descendants du grand Henri, depuis leur retour en France... Paris: Le Normant.
