= Canton of Jaunay-Marigny =

Coordinates: 46.68°N 0.37°E

The canton of Jaunay-Marigny (before March 2020: canton of Jaunay-Clan) is an administrative division of the Vienne department, western France. It was created at the French canton reorganisation which came into effect in March 2015. Its seat is in Jaunay-Marigny.

It consists of the following communes:

1. Beaumont Saint-Cyr
2. Chabournay
3. Dissay
4. Jaunay-Marigny
5. Saint-Georges-lès-Baillargeaux
6. Saint-Martin-la-Pallu
