= D'Aubigné =

d'Aubigné is a French surname. Notable people with the surname include:

- Constant d'Aubigné
- Jean-Henri Merle d'Aubigné, Swiss Protestant minister and historian
- Agrippa d'Aubigné, French poet, soldier, propagandist, and chronicler
- Françoise d'Aubigné, Marquise de Maintenon (1635–1719), teacher and wife of King Louis XIV
- Françoise Charlotte d'Aubigné (1684–1739), niece and heir of Madame de Maintenon
- Charles d'Aubigné, Comte d'Aubigné (1634–1703), brother of Madame de Maintenon
