= Anne Claude de Caylus =

French antiquarian (1692–1765)

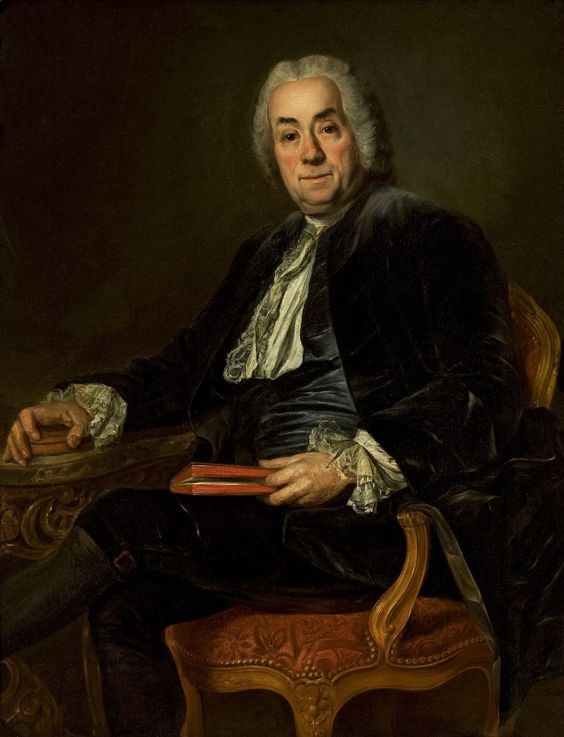
- Count de Caylus by Alexander Roslin, National Museum, Warsaw
- Born: 31 October 1692; Paris
- Died: 5 September 1765 (aged 72)
- Scientific career
- Fields: antiquarian archaeologist

Anne Claude de Tubières-Grimoard de Pestels de Lévis, comte de Caylus, marquis d'Esternay, baron de Bransac (Anne Claude Philippe; 31 October 1692 – 5 September 1765), was a French antiquarian, proto-archaeologist and man of letters.

Born in Paris, he was the eldest son of Lieutenant-General Anne de Tubières, comte de Caylus. His mother, Marthe-Marguerite de Villette de Mursay, comtesse de Caylus (1673–1729), was the daughter of vice-admiral Philippe, Marquis de Villette-Mursay. His younger brother was Charles de Tubières de Caylus, who became a naval officer and governor of Martinique.

He was a cousin of Madame de Maintenon, who brought Marthe-Marguerite up like her own daughter. Marthe-Marguerite wrote valuable Souvenirs of the court of Louis XIV; these were edited by Voltaire (1770), and by many later editors.

== Career ==
While a young man, Caylus distinguished himself in the campaigns of the French army, from 1709 to 1714. After the peace of Rastatt (1714) he spent some time in travelling in Italy, Greece, the Levant, England, and Germany, and devoted much attention to the study and collection of antiquities. He became an active member of the Académie royale de peinture et de sculpture and of the Académie des Inscriptions. Chief among his antiquarian works must be the profusely illustrated Recueil d'antiquités égyptiennes, étrusques, grecques, romaines et gauloises (6 vols., Paris, 1752–1755), (Note: Caylus website (French).) which was mined by the designers of Neoclassical arts for the rest of the century. His Numismata Aurea Imperatorum Romanorum, treats only the gold coinage of the Roman emperors, those worthy of collection by a grand seigneur. His concentration on the object itself marked a step towards modern connoisseurship, and in his Mémoire (1755) on the method of encaustic painting, the ancient technique of painting with wax as a medium mentioned by Pliny the Elder, he claimed to have rediscovered the method. Denis Diderot, who was no friend to Caylus, maintained that the proper method had been found by J.-B. Bachelier.

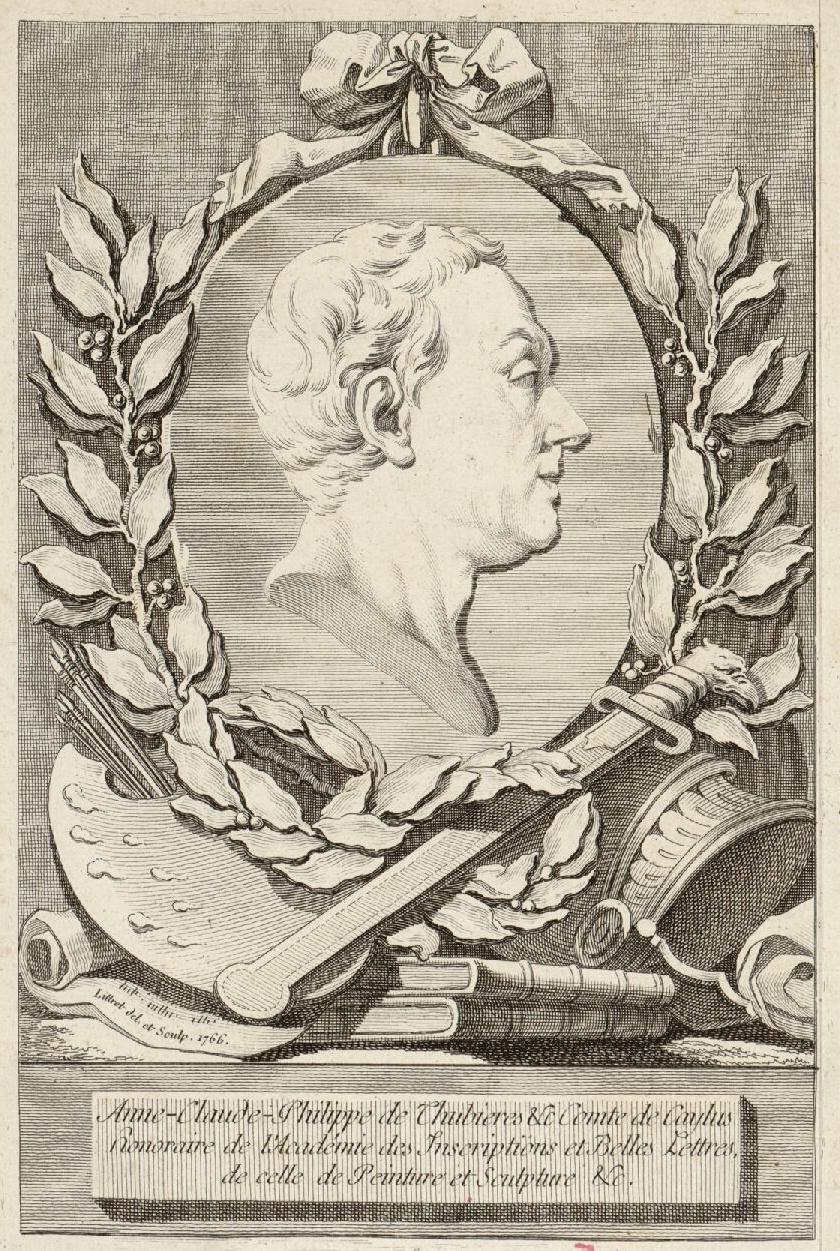
Caylus in Receuil d'Antiquités, Book 7, 1767

Caylus was an admirable and prolific etcher. He worked chiefly from drawings by Italian and French masters, including examples from the collection of Pierre Crozat and the Cabinet du Roi (the collection of the King); he also made many etchings from drawings by his friend Antoine Watteau and the sculptor Edmé Bouchardon. He caused engravings to be made, at his own expense, of Bartoli's copies from ancient pictures. His publications Nouveaux sujets de peinture et de sculpture (1755) and Tableaux tirés de l'Iliade, de l'Odyssée, et de l'Enéide (1757) consist of descriptions of subjects from classical literature for the inspiration of contemporary artists and their patrons.

His cultural interests were not confined to the arts of Classical Antiquity but extended to Gallic monuments, such as the megaliths of Aurille (Poitou), of which he commissioned drawings in 1762.

He encouraged artists whose reputations were still in the making, and befriended the connoisseur and collector of prints and drawings Pierre-Jean Mariette when Mariette was only twenty-two, but his patronage was somewhat capricious. Diderot expressed this fact in an epigram in his Salon of 1765: "Death has delivered us from the cruellest of connoisseurs." (Note: "La mort nous a délivré du plus cruel des amateurs.") Caylus had quite another side to his character. He had a thorough acquaintance with the gayest and most disreputable sides of Parisian life, and left a number of more or less witty stories dealing with it. These were collected (Amsterdam, 1787) as his Œuvres badines complètes. The best of them is the Histoire de M. Guillaume, cocher (c. 1730). His Contes, hovering between French fairy tales and oriental fantasies, between conventional charm and moral satire, have been collected and were published in 2005; they were originally published as les Féeries nouvelles (1741), les Contes orientaux (1743), Cinq contes de fées (1745), plus two posthumous stories published in 1775.

The Souvenirs du comte de Caylus, published in 1805, is of very doubtful authenticity. See also E. and J. de Goncourt, Portraits intimes du XVIIIième siècle; Charles Nisard's edition of the Correspondance du comte de Caylus avec le père Paciaudi (1877); and a notice by O. Uzanne prefixed to a volume of his Facties (1879).

=== Items of Caylus' collection ===
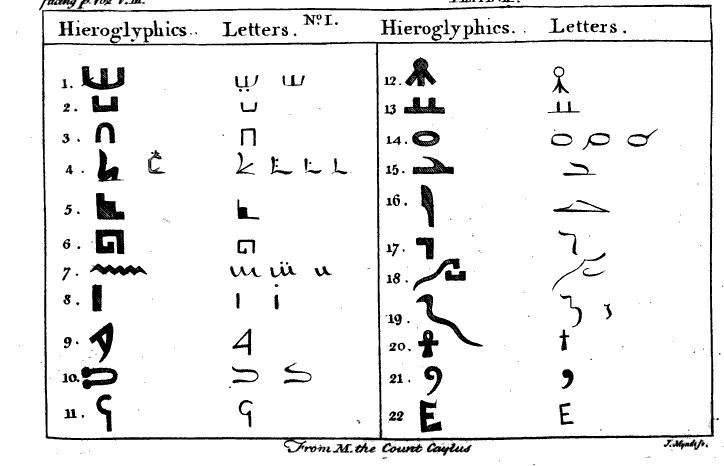
Illustration from the 1765 edition of The Divine Legation of Moses, showing the theory of the Comte de Caylus on Egyptian hieroglyphics.

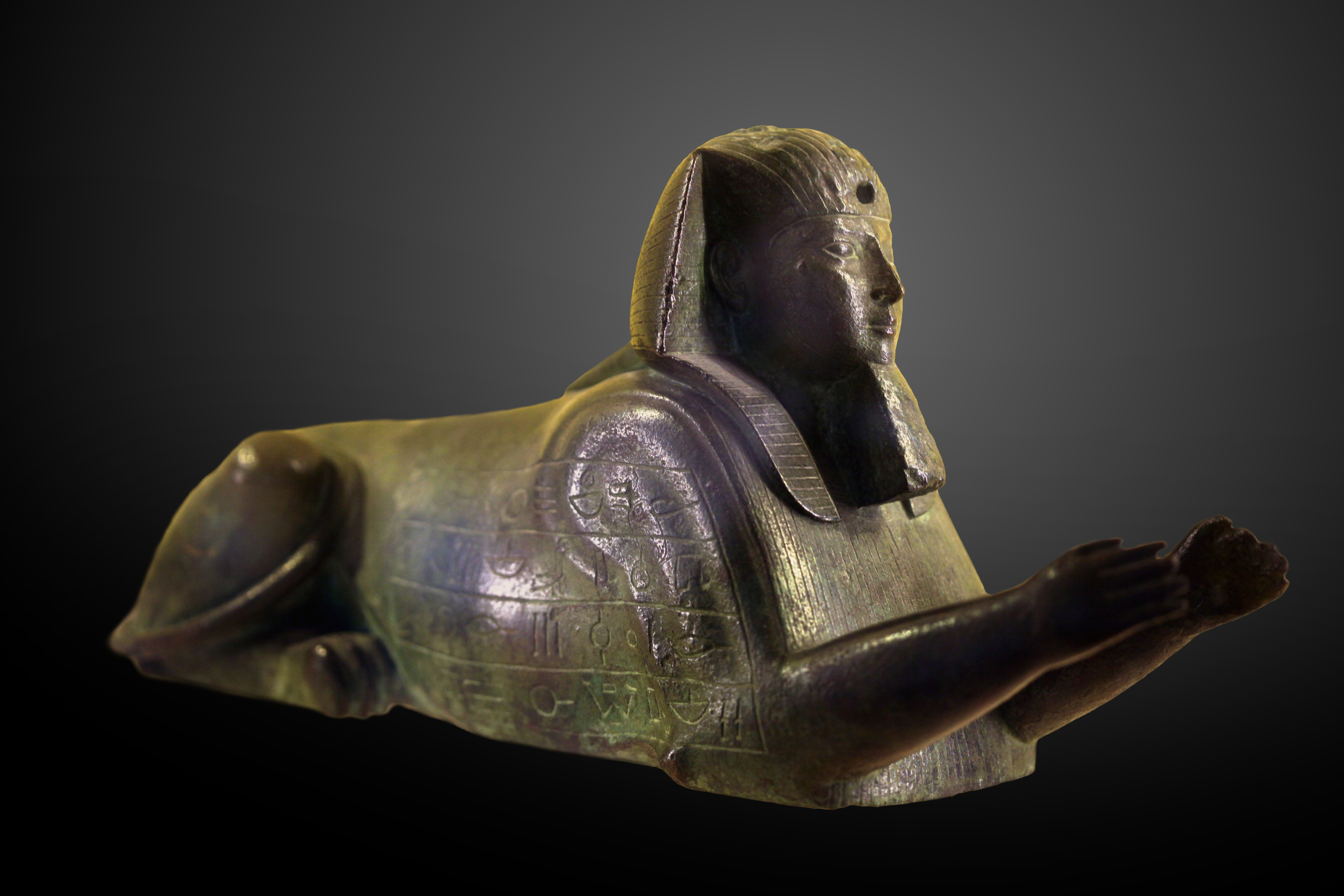
Sphinx of Pharaoh Apries of the Twenty-sixth Dynasty of Egypt, from the collection of Count Caylus, now at the Louvre.

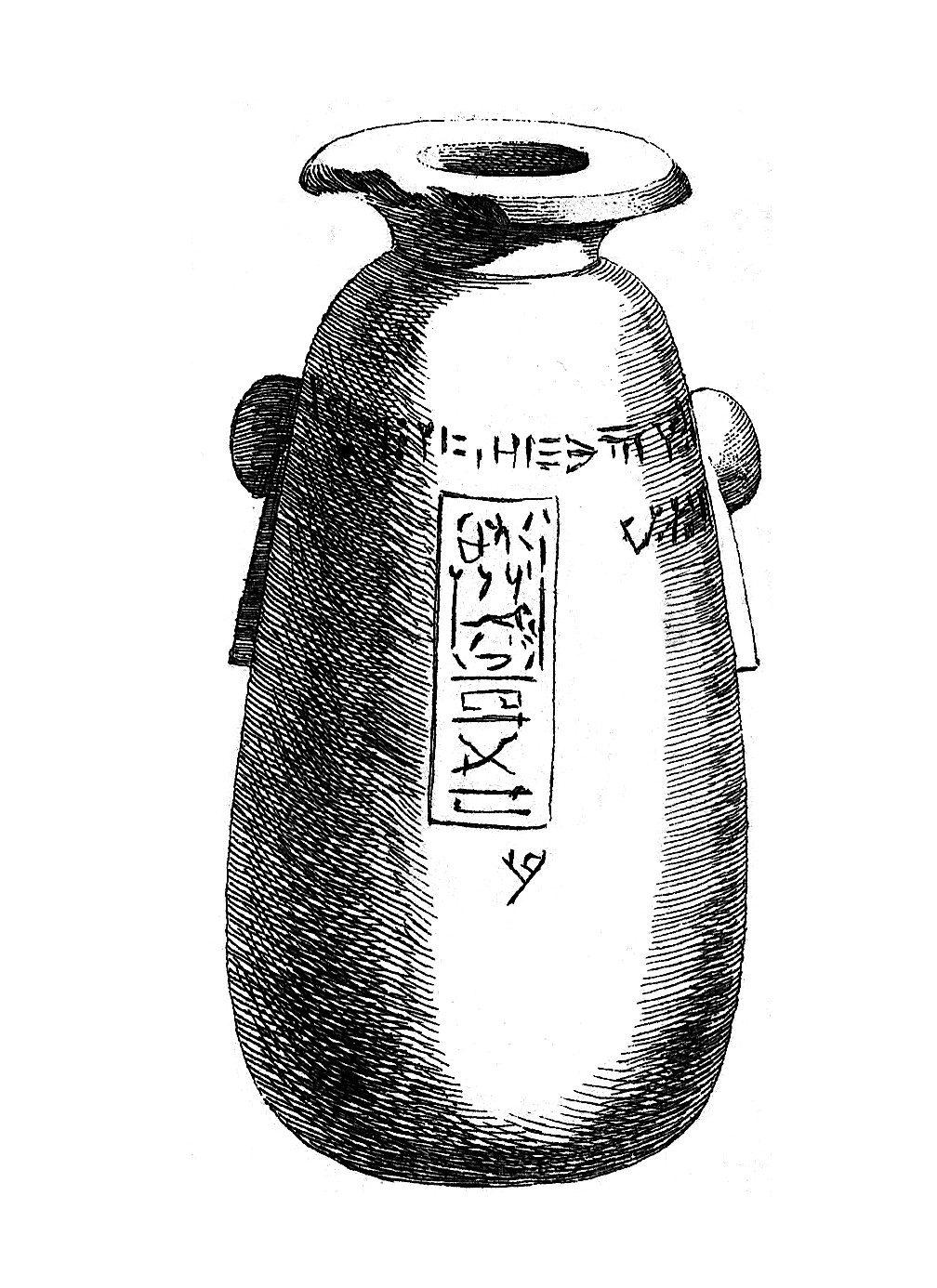
The "Caylus vase" in the name of Xerxes I, was key in the decipherment of cuneiform. Now in the Cabinet des Médailles.

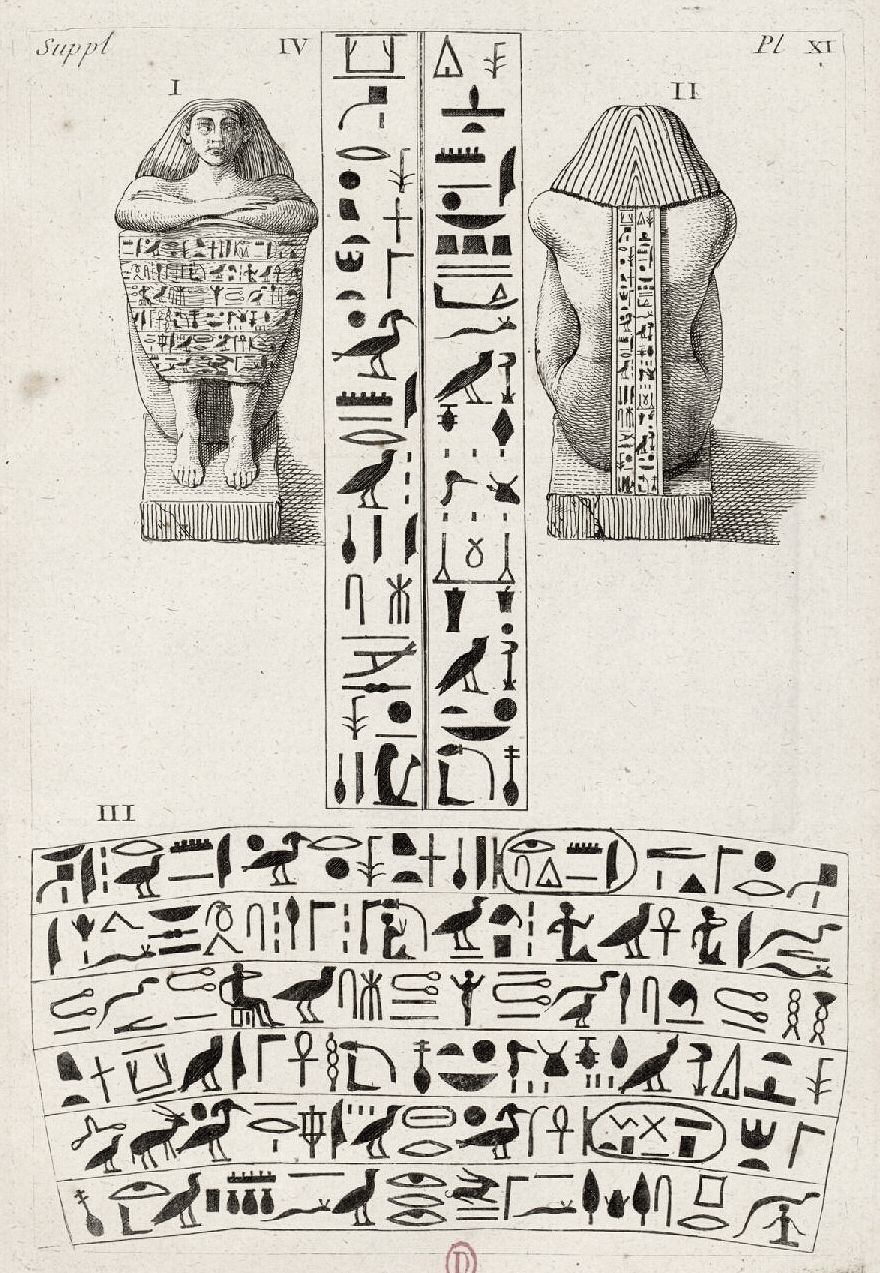
Transcription of hieroglyphs on an Egyptian statue by Count Caylus, 1767

=== Fairy tales ===
Folklorist Andrew Lang published some of Comte de Caylus's tales in his book The Green Fairy Book, as part of his collection of color fairy books. These are:

- Rosanella (Rosanie)
- Heart of Ice (Le prince Courtebotte et la princesse Zibeline)
- Sylvain and Jocosa (Tourlou et Rirette)
- The Yellow Bird (L'Oiseau Jaune) – inserted in the narrative of Sylvain and Jocosa
- Fairy Gifts (Les dons)

The following tales were also published by Andrew Lang, but without the proper authorship:

- Prince Narcissus and the Princess Potentilla (La Princesse Pimprenella et Le Prince Romarin)
- Prince Featherhead and the Princess Celandine (Le Prince Muguet et la Princesse Zaza)
- Prince Vivien and the Princess Placida (Nonchalante et Papillon)

British dramatist James Planché also translated the following of de Caylus's tales into English:

- Princess Minute and King Floridor (La princesse Minutie et le roi Floridor)
- The Impossible Enchantment (L'enchantement impossible)
- Bleuette and Coquelicot (Bleuette et Coquelicot)

The tale Mignonette was also translated into English as Prince Chaffinch.

== Works ==
- Caylus. Recueil d'antiquités égyptiennes, étrusques, grecques et romaines. Tome 1.
- Recueil d'antiquités égyptiennes, étrusques, grecques, romaines et gauloises : Tome cinquième (1762)

== Sources ==
- Leonardo da Vinci: anatomical drawings from the Royal Library, Windsor Castle, exhibition catalog fully online as PDF from The Metropolitan Museum of Art, which contains material on Caylus's da Vinci collection (see index)
- Contes orientaux / Oriental Tales at HathiTrust
