= Françoise Chandernagor =

French writer (born 1945)

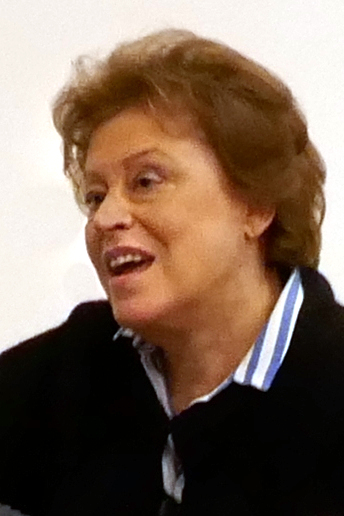
Françoise Chandernagor in 2012

Françoise Chandernagor (born 15 June 1945, Palaiseau) is a French writer. The daughter of André Chandernagor, she is a former student of the École nationale d'administration, and she became a member of the Council of State in 1969.

== Early life and education ==
She was born to a family of masons related to the descendants of an Indian free slave (hence her name). She married Philippe Jurgensen and is the mother of three children. Françoise Chandernagor divides her life between Paris and France's central region.

After receiving her diploma from the institute of political studies of Paris and a master's degree in public law, she was admitted at age 21 to the National School of Administration - École nationale d'administration (ÉNA), finishing two years later at the top of her class, the first woman to reach such position. In 1969 she entered the Council of State where she held various legal posts, most notably as Attorney-General.

== Career ==
She also held positions in the foreign service, both in cultural and economic affairs, and held leadership positions in charities, particularly as the vice president of the France Foundation until 1988 and as the vice president of the Aguesseau Foundation. In 1991, she drafted the annual report of the Council of State on "sécurité juridique" (The protection of the rights of the citizen in the judicial system). She left the administration and abandoned her career as a civil servant in 1993, to dedicate her time to writing.

L'Allée du Roi (The King's Way) Françoise Chandernagor.

Since 1981, when she published The King's Way (fictionalized memoirs of Madam de Maintenon - Françoise d'Aubigné, marquise de Maintenon, the second wife of Louis XIV), Françoise Chandernagor wrote six novels and a play (Brussels in 1993-1994 and to Paris in 1994-1995). Several of her novels were translated in fifteen languages, and two of them were the object of television adaptations.

Françoise Chandernagor presides the Jean Giono Prize, and is currently the administrator of the Foundation of the Castle of Maintenon, Corporation of the readers of the World, and Century. She is member of the Académie Goncourt since June 1995.

== Works ==
- L'Allée du Roi (1981)
- Leçons de ténèbres
- La Sans Pareille (1988)
- L'Archange de Vienne (1989)
- L'Enfant aux loups (1990)
- L'Ombre du Soleil (monologue théâtral after L'Allée du Roi, 1994)
- L'Enfant des Lumières (1995)
- La Première épouse (1998)
- Maintenon (in collaboration with Georges Poisson, 2001)
- La Chambre (2002)
- Couleur du temps (2004)
