= Marquise de Caylus =

French noblewoman and writer

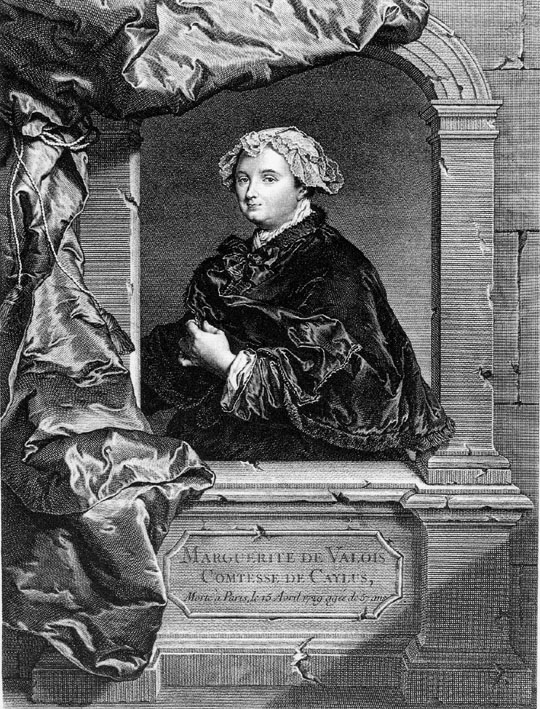
Engraving by Jean Daullé after Rigaud

Marthe-Marguerite Le Valois de Villette de Mursay, marquise de Caylus (1673–1729), was a French noblewoman and writer.

Born in Poitou, she was the daughter of vice-admiral Philippe, Marquis de Villette-Mursay, and Marie-Anne de Châteauneuf, who died in 1691. Her father was a cousin of Madame de Maintenon, who brought up Marthe-Marguerite like her own daughter.

In 1686 she married Anne de Tubières, comte de Caylus (1666–1704), and had two sons. Her elder son, Anne-Claude-Philippe (1692–1765), was also a man of letters and an archaeologist.

Madame de Caylus left piquant and valuable memoirs of the court of Louis XIV and the house of St. Cyr. These were edited by Voltaire (1770), and by many later editors. They were translated into English by Elizabeth Griffith as Memoirs, anecdotes, and characters of the court of Lewis XIV. Translated from Les Souvenirs, or recollections of Madame de Caylus (1770).

== Literature ==
- Souvenirs de Madame de Caylus, in the Complete Works of Voltaire, vol. 71A, Voltaire Foundation (2005), ISBN 978-0-7294-0863-9
- Souvenirs de Madame de Caylus, Mercure de France (1986), ISBN 2-7152-1424-3
