= Maison royale de Saint-Louis =

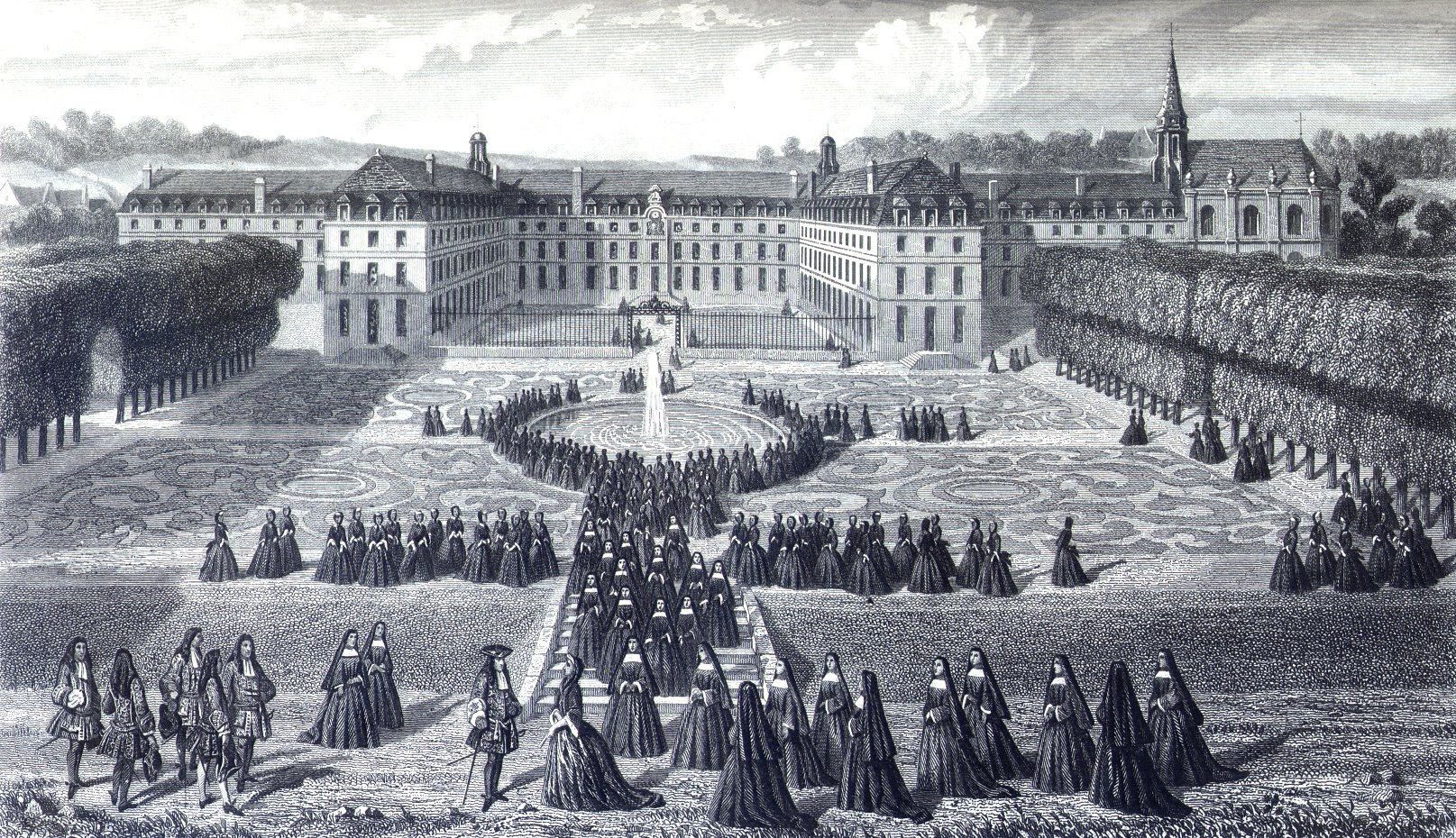
- Saint-Cyr-l'École, Yvelines; France

Information
- Type: Maison d'éducation
- Founded: 1686
- Founder: Madame de Maintenon
- Status: Closed - buildings reused by École spéciale militaire de Saint-Cyr and Lycée militaire de Saint-Cyr
- Closed: 1803
- Head of school: Madame de Brinon

The Maison Royale de Saint-Louis was a boarding school for girls set up on 15 June 1686 at Saint-Cyr (what is now the commune of Saint-Cyr-l'École, Yvelines) in France by King Louis XIV at the request of his secret second wife, Françoise d'Aubigné, Marquise de Maintenon, who wanted a school for girls from impoverished noble families. The establishment lost its leading role on the deaths of Louis and then Maintenon, but it nevertheless marked an evolution in female education under the Ancien Régime. Its notable students included Maintenon's niece Marthe-Marguerite Le Valois de Villette de Mursay, marquise de Caylus, and Napoleon's sister Elisa Bonaparte, grand duchess of Tuscany.

It remained in existence during the first years of the French Revolution, but closed for good in March 1793, with its empty buildings being taken over by the École spéciale militaire de Saint-Cyr in 1808. However, the Maison royale later provided Napoleon with the inspiration for his Maison des demoiselles de la Légion d'honneur, which still exists as the Maison d'éducation de la Légion d'honneur.

== History ==
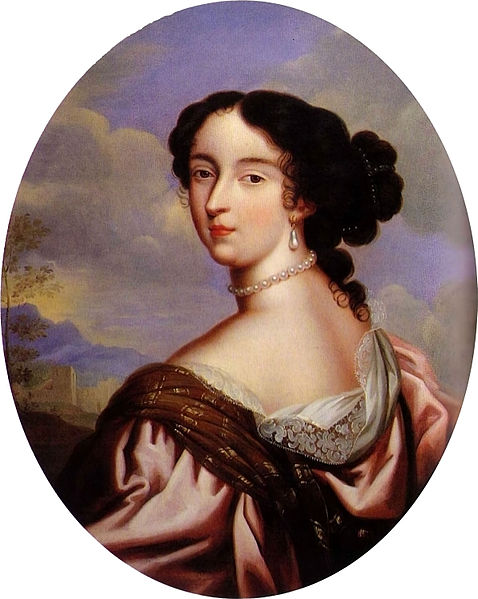
Françoise d'Aubigné, Marquise de Maintenon

=== Maintenon's wishes ===
The origins of the Maison Royale de Saint-Louis were strongly linked to the youth of Madame de Maintenon. She was herself from a noble family which had fallen on hard times; she received only a limited education, administered via the convents, which were then the only institutions educating noble girls. Their curricula were minimal, with lessons in French, Latin, mathematics and domestic work. The main emphasis was on religion and liturgy, with no opening onto the real world.

Madame de Maintenon later moved in intellectual circles, thanks to her first husband, Scarron, before becoming governess to the children of Madame de Montespan, giving her exposure to education and a vocation as an educator. Once beside Louis XIV, de Maintenon wished to improve the education available to girls from impoverished noble families, who were becoming increasingly numerous because many provincial noblemen died in Louis's wars or expended their fortunes in his service.

=== Founding ===
In 1680, Madame de Maintenon took on two nuns, the former ursuline Madame de Brinon and her relation Madame de Saint-Pierre, who was the head of a small school established to train poor girls for jobs in domestic service. In 1686 she set the nuns up in a house at Rueil which she had rented and fitted out. She added twenty girls from poor noble families to students drawn from among the people, who were taught a different curriculum. In 1684 the Maison Royale was visited by the Chinese Catholic convert Michael Shen Fu-Tsung. Also that year, on 3 February 1684, the school for daughters of impoverished noble families was moved to Noisy-le-Roi, with help from the king, who offered the Château de Noisy, acquiring it and fitting it out to house more than 180 'pensionnaires'. On 15 August 1684, in Grand Conseil, Louis XIV decreed the founding of

a house and community where a considerable number of young girls, from noble families and particularly those whose fathers have died in the service ... are housed for free ... and receive all the educations suited to their birth and their sex ... so that after having studied in this community, those who leave it can be examples of modesty and virtue in all the provinces of our kingdom...

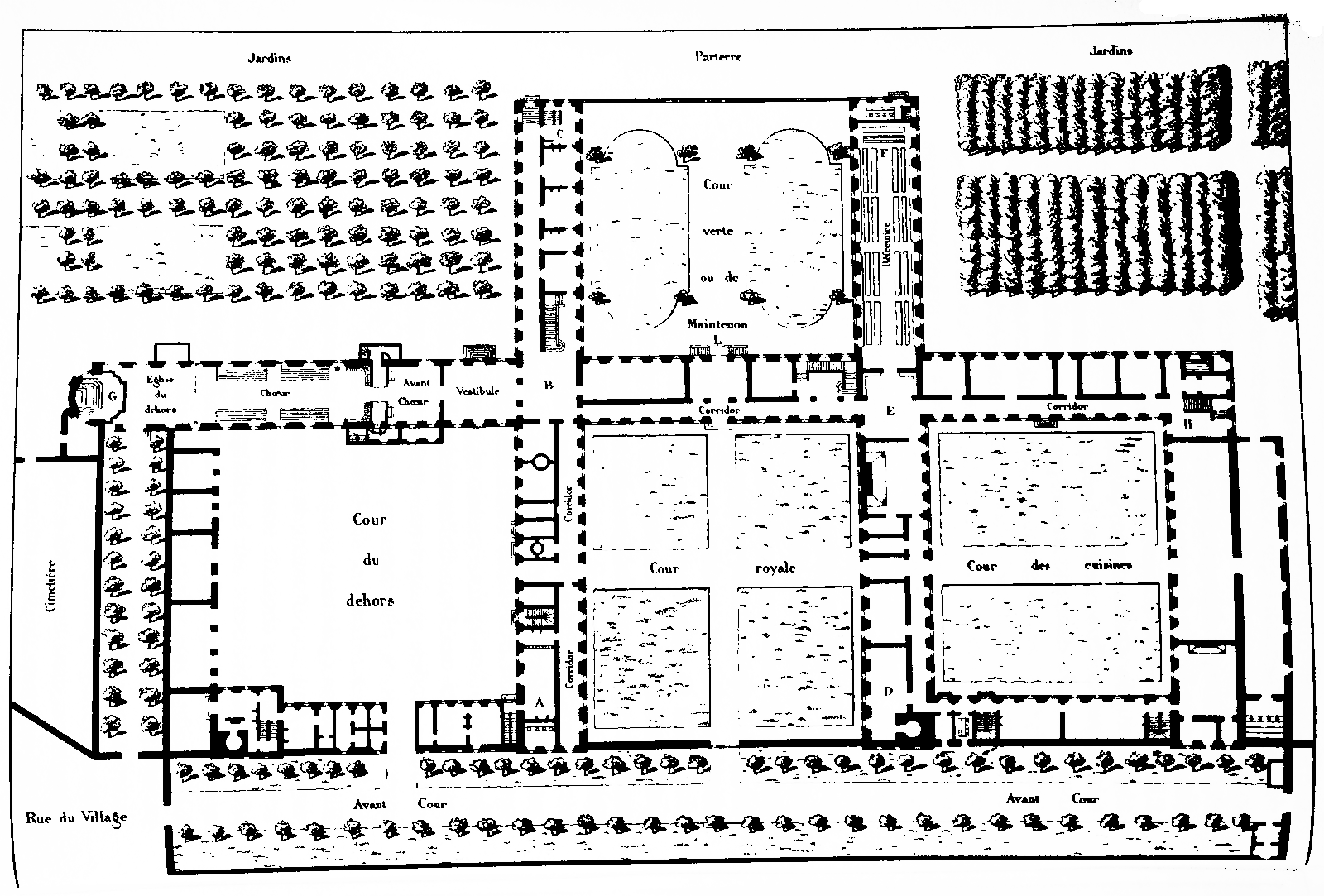
Plan of the ground floor of the Maison Royale de Saint-Louis.

The domaine of Saint-Cyr was assigned to the Maison in 1685, and the King ordered major building work on the domain next to Versailles, led by Jules Hardouin-Mansart. The project cost the King 1,400,000 livres. Hardouin-Mansart's designs for the Maison used the U-shaped plan he often used elsewhere, with the buildings reserved for the mistresses and students forming an H, to which the school chapel had to be added to the west. The classrooms and students' dormitories were on the first and second floors respectively, the dormitories just above the classrooms for the corresponding classes. Each dormitory held 40 beds and was surrounded by two cells for the mistresses. Each classroom was also juxtaposed with a small supplementary dormitory with 20 beds, itself next to two cells for the mistresses. The infirmary was sited away from the dormitories to allow the sick to be isolated and thus avoid the spread of contagious diseases. The rooms reserved for pensionnaires were situated to the east of the buildings, to put them as far as possible from the visitor entrance, situated to the west at the level of the external courtyard.

In June 1686, after 15 months of work, Louis XIV gave the domain to the Maison Royale de Saint-Louis, in letters patent of 18 and 26 June 1686 confirming the founding of the establishment. From 26 July to 1 August 1686, the pensionnaires, known as the "Demoiselles de Saint-Cyr", entered the establishment in a grand procession thanks to Louis, who lent them his carriages and his Swiss guards. Madame de Brinon was made the institution's superior for life, and Madame de Maintenon was given the title of "Institutrice de la Maison Royale de Saint-Louis", which gave her total authority over the Maison. The King also granted her an apartment at Saint-Cyr which she could use when she wished. The school's chapel was consecrated to Our Lady on 2 August that year and the relics of St Candide, previously held at the chapel of Noisy, were transferred there. The King made his first visit to Saint-Cyr in September 1686, when he was welcomed by the ladies and pensionnaires in a major ceremony.

Major figures became interested in the foundation of the Maison Royale. At the start of 1687, Fontenelle, competing for an eloquence prize at the Académie, sang of "les Demoiselles de Saint-Cyr" and "[their] famous model of beauty united with innocence."

=== Organisation ===
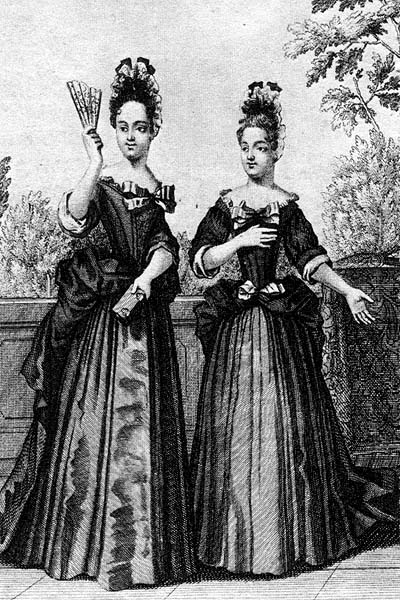
Two "Demoiselles de Saint-Cyr".

The Maison Royale de Saint-Louis was opened "to the daughters of gentlemen who have been killed or exhausted their health or their fortune in the service of the State", who would enter the school aged between 7 and 12. The King himself decided on who the school admitted, after consulting with experts on French genealogy who could guarantee that applicants possessed at least four generations of noble birth on their father's side. Many pensionnaires were daughters, nieces or orphans of soldiers and, though many of them were from Paris and its outskirts, the school had students from every province of France and even from abroad (e.g., three Québécoises in the 1750s). The school buildings housed 250 students, cared for by 36 female educators or "professes", 24 "converses" sisters carrying out domestic tasks, some priests, and lay personnel.

The students, aged 7 to 20, were divided by age into four "classes". They wore a uniform in the form of a brown muslin robe akin to court robes, tied with ribbons whose colour indicated the wearer's class—red for 7 to 10 years old; green for 11 to 14; yellow for 15–16; and blue for 17–20. They also wore a white bonnet which left their hair partly uncovered. Each class had its own room. This uniform and division by age were echoed in Noisy:

[Madame de Maintenon] had a grand morning meeting one day in Noisy, carrying a basket full of blue, yellow, green and red ribbons by which she designated each Demoiselle in the class to which she was suited ... They were separated out into different bedrooms and thus called according to the name of their ribbon, the Red class, the Blue class, etc. There was some question of giving the students clothing that was uniform, simple, modest, but noble ... it was decided that they were to dress in brown Mans muslin, then more fashionable than it is today. This dress consisted of a coat and a skirt, the bonnet being of white canvas with a lace piece, all decorated with a ribbon.

Each class was headed by a "maîtresse de classe", who was herself supported by a second mistress and sub-mistresses. Some of the oldest and most talented students were deputised for these mistresses and wore black ribbons. Indeed, the role of the "blacks" was wider. Chosen from among the most talented and disciplined of the "blues", they were in charge of helping the teachers and in the hospital, refectory, accounts, etc. The class mistresses were led by a "Maîtresse générale des classes", who not only coordinated the different classes but also had responsibility for the students outside of school hours.

The mistresses and other ladies were not nuns but took "simples" or temporary religious vows of poverty, chastity and obedience, as well as vows to "devote their life to the education and instruction of the demoiselles", which Madame de Maintenon judged to be the most important vow of all. They were uniformly dressed in black muslin, with a black bonnet.

The students were housed at Saint-Cyr until they reached 20 and were not supposed to leave it until that age, unless in cases of dismissal, marriage or "exceptional family circumstances." When they left the school at the end of their studies, they received a dowry of 3,000 livres either for a suitable marriage or to allow them to enter a convent. However, some ex-students did not leave and remained there as teachers. To guarantee the quality of teaching, students who wished to become teachers followed a "noviciate" of 6 years during which they were trained in teaching by the "Maîtresse des novices".

The revenues to maintain the establishment came from rents and exploitation of its domaines, subsidies from the Généralité de Paris and revenues of the Abbaye de Saint-Denis to which it was attached.

=== Teaching ===
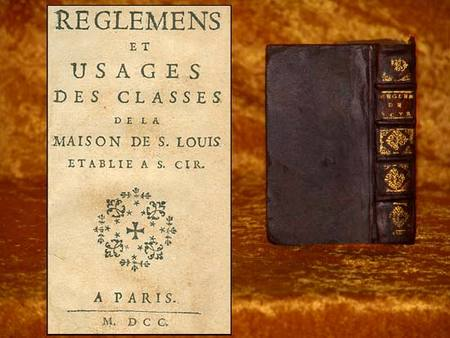
Rules of the Maison Royale de Saint-Louis.

The school's rules, often called les Constitutions, stated in article 54 "what to teach young ladies":

First to learn of God and religion (...) They must be inspired with a great horror of vice and a great love of virtue [...]. They must learn the duties of an honest woman in her household, as regards her husband, children and servants [...]. They must learn to bear themselves with a good grace [...] they must learn to read perfectly, to write, spelling, arithmetic [...] Those meant for service must learn to comb, to dress hair ...

Each class had a timetable appropriate to its students' age:

- the "reds" learned reading, writing, arithmetic and geometry, receiving their first lessons in the catechism and the rudiments of religious history and Latin
- the "greens" continued in these subjects, along with history and geography
- the "yellows" also learned drawing, singing, dance and music
- the "blues" were initiated into heraldry, the history of the Catholic Church and more detailed teaching in morality

All the pensionnaires' days played out according to the same timetable : they got up at 6am and went to their classrooms at 7 with the first prayers of the days, before having their morning meal in the refectory. They then studied from 8 until 12 before having lunch. The lunch break lasted until 2pm, when classes began again. These lasted until 6pm, when they had supper. They finally went to bed at 9pm. Each moment of the day was punctuated by a prayer. This timetable was shorter than that of most convents, where students had to get up at 4am for Matins.

Helping in the domestic tasks at the Maison Royale formed part of the students' education. The eldest, especially the "blues" and "blacks", had to assist at the refectory or the infirmary, or sewing clothes and dresses for their fellow students or the teachers. Their leisure time was also important and Madame de Maintenon encouraged the students to use them for intellectual games such as chess and checkers, though card games were banned. The 1709 Mémoires des Dames de Saint-Cyr wrote that:

Madame [de Maintenon] was gracious to give to the classes a large number of sets of checkers, chess etc. and also strongly recommended that they be trained as regularly on them as on their books, because it was of great consequence to busy youth innocently and usefully, and that these sorts of games were proper to them.

According to the wishes of Madame de Maintenon, the education provided at Saint-Cyr was different from that traditionally practiced in convents, where education was minimal and principally centred on religion. The Maison's students were educated to be the future wives and ladies of the nobility, receiving an education that was severe but showed proof of the era's modernity, in particular in its refusal to neglect secular education to make time for religious education. The arts were also taught at Saint-Cyr — in particular theatre, which Madame de Maintenon appreciated - when convents generally did not teach these things, disapproving of actors. The personnel of the Maison were lay and not religious, which was unique for the era.

This uniqueness did not prevent the Maison from imposing strict discipline - its students had no holidays and were not allowed to see their families more than four times a year, in the parlour. The dormitories were not heated, the beds were voluntarily hard in order not to 'soften' the pensionnaires, and they washed in cold water only.

From 1698, Madame de Maintenon made unprecedented modifications to the Maison - each class was no longer placed entirely under the leadership of its mistresses, but split up into "families" of eight to ten students, each with a "mother", generally the eldest student in the group, and made the responsibility of one of the class mistresses. Each family had a banked semi-circular bench, with the students placed around the convex part and the mistress at the centre:

Madame de Maintenon, to better improve their conduct, thought of separating them into bands and substituting for the two big tables six or seven smaller ones, which would each have a fixed number of Demoiselles, with the students not allowed to sit anywhere else without instructions from the Mistresses. She made a first attempt at a small class size, and when this proved a success, the same thing was observed by the other classes and still remains to be seen to this day.".

=== Controversy over Racine's Esther ===
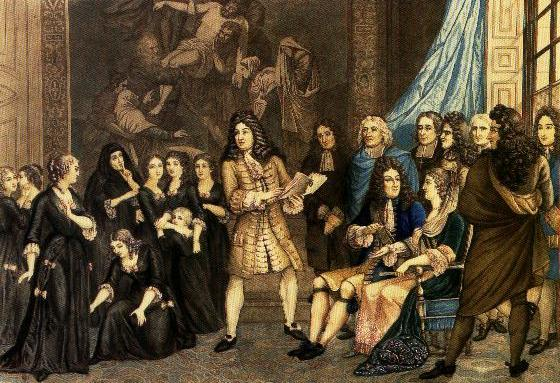
Racine puts on a repeat performance of Esther by the students of Saint-Cyr in the presence of Louis XIV and Madame de Maintenon.

The students at Saint-Cyr first learned theatre in plays written by Madame de Brinon, then in the Conversations written for them by Madame de Maintenon on different moral subjects. They then played in tragedies by Corneille and Racine. However, Madame de Maintenon was unhappy to see the Demoiselles playing scenes of amorous passion with too much ardour, and so Racine wrote the students a religious piece, Esther, which Madame de Maintenon planned to put on before the King and court. This gave rise to a deep dispute between Madame de Maintenon and Madame de Brinon, with the latter opposed to a production that she suspected was only for Madame de Maintenon's own glory. This dispute was not new - since 1687, Madame de Brinon frequently reproached Madame de Maintenon for being around the establishment too much and imposing on Madame de Brinon, its superior. Being its superior for life, Madame de Brinon could not be replaced, but a lettre de cachet sealed on 10 December 1688 allowed the play to be put on. Madame de Loubert, previously secretary to Madame de Maintenon and aged only 22, replaced Madame de Brinon as secretary on 19 May 1689.

Esther was premiered on 26 January 1689 at Saint-Cyr in the presence of Louis XIV, Madame de Maintenon and many other courtiers. The girls who acted in the play, mostly "blues", received from Madame de Maintenon costumes decorated with diamonds and precious stones and, moreover, :

so that nothing in this spectacle might be disagreeable to this Prince, she had Persian clothes made for all the Demoiselles who were to appear on the stage : they were very brilliant, ornamented with pearls and diamonds from the Temple, which had previously been used in the ballets.

The sets were designed by Borin, the set designer of the court spectacles, and the play's music was played by the King's musicians. The preparations for the production cost a total of more than 14,000 livres. There were four more productions of the play in February 1690, with the last on 19 February. Marguerite de Villette, aged 16 and recently married to the marquis de Caylus, played the rôle of Esther.

The production's success was important to the King and his courtiers, so much so that they considered a great honour to be invited to it. However it quickly displeased Madame de Maintenon, who feared that the school's students would fall prey to courtiers and above all that the production would make them too proud:

So innocent and pious was the spectacle that attracted the whole world, it could by frequent visits become prejudicial to the Demoiselles; it was this that brought criticism from the M. l'abbé des Marais and the Messieurs des Missions Etrangères : they believed that the applause of the King and the whole Court could form a trap capable of undoing the good Madame de Maintenon wanted to establish, that [the students] might give themselves over to vanity and love of the world from which they might find it difficult to return.

=== Further controversy ===
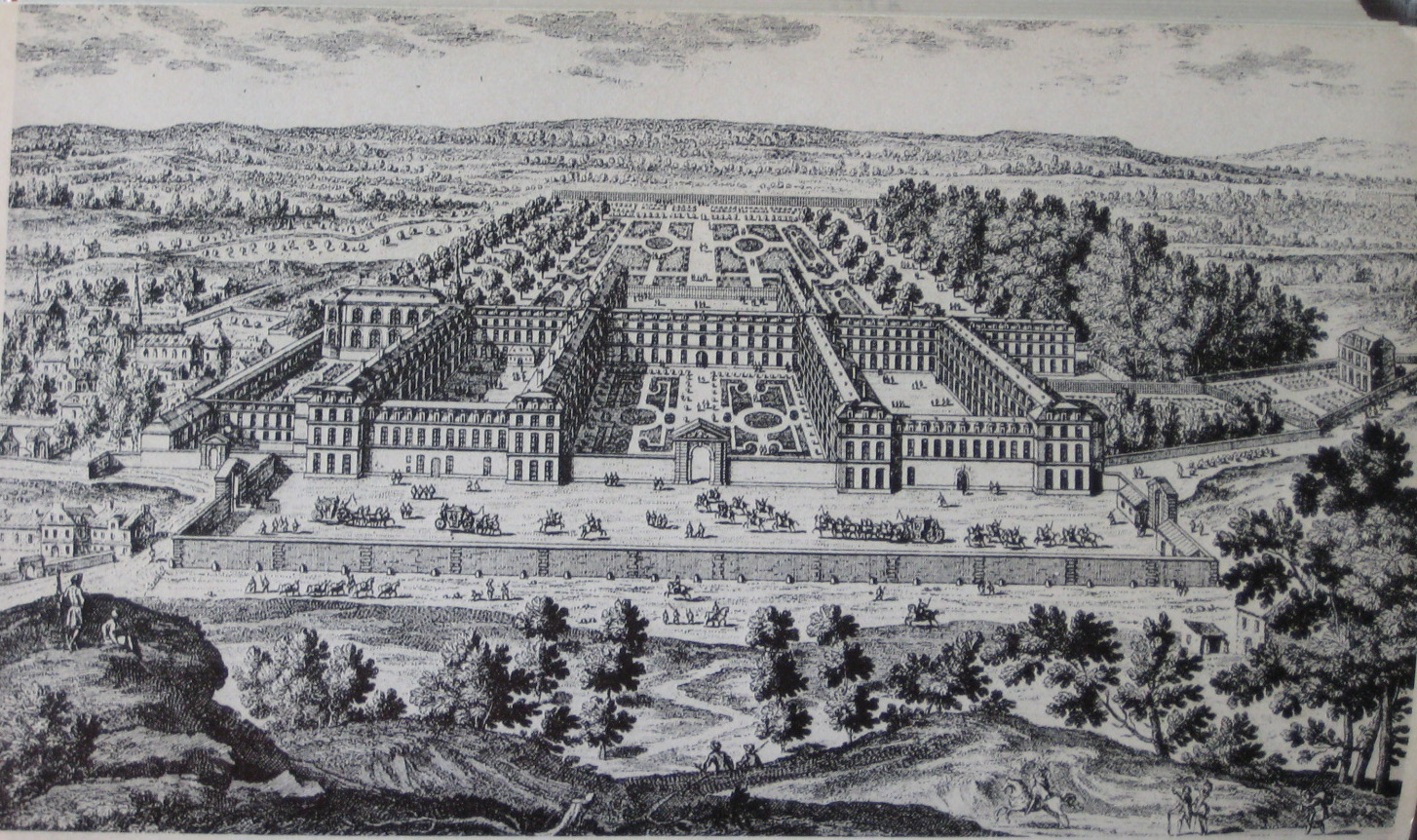
View of the Maison Royale de Saint-Louis at the start of the 18th century.

After the production of Esther, Madame de Maintenon thought of cancelling all plays at Saint-Cyr, but the King demanded that they put on Racine's new play, Athalie - their production began on 5 January 1691 and took place in an atmosphere of great discretion, with no costume other than the Saint-Cyr uniforms and in the presence of nobody but the royal family, except for 22 January when they were joined by James and Mary (former king and queen of England), Fénelon and some bishops.

The two guides of Madame de Maintenon's conscience, Fénelon and Abbé Paul Godet des Marais (who had become bishop of Chartres), demanded she renounce glory and return to Saint-Cyr its "humility and simplicity". The school's discipline became stricter, with bans on coquetterie and on books that had at first been allowed into Saint-Cyr but were now judged to be too profane for it.

(…) In the classes all the manuscripts not treating on pious subjects were sought out and removed. Moreover, to humble the Demoiselles, a show was made of neglecting them (...) the ribbon was diminished, only being given with prodigality once each quarter [ie trimester]

Madame de Maintenon also recommended that teachers should not hesitate to punish students and contain their pride, stating:

Our girls were too considered, too caressed, too contrived; they must forget themselves in their classes, be made to obey the rules of the day and not speak of anything else.

She also demanded that all males except priests be banned from the Maison, with even priests only allowed to meet the students in the confessional.

=== Conversion to a convent ===
The church and the Jansenists condemned the production of Esther and the lack of discipline which seemed to reign at Saint-Cyr, adding that girls' education should not be entrusted to lay people. Moreover, it was held to be incongruous that the Maison was a secular house, not a convent, and yet was financed by revenues from the Abbey of Saint-Denis. Although neither Madame de Maintenon nor the King wanted the Maison to become a convent, she admitted that her attempt at secular education at Saint-Cyr had failed and accepted its transformation into a convent. Thus, in November 1692, the pope pronounced the extinction of the abbatial title of Saint-Denis, and the Maison's transformation into a convent was decided on in September 1692 – the pope's request was made via Godet des Marais:

the bishop of Chartres made supplication to His Holiness in the name of the Ladies of the Maison de Saint-Louis to obtain [permission for their] change from a secular state into a regular Augustinian one. All signed this request that the Bishop sent to Rome, a favour which it was not difficult to obtain, seeing the regard in which the King founder and Madame de Maintenon were held in this court.

The conversion became effective from 1 December and the teachers were given the choice between taking solemn vows and thus becoming nuns, and leaving the Maison altogether. From 1692 to 1694, mother Priolo, from the Chaillot convent, was put in charge of their teaching during their time as novices.

At the start of 1694, Madame de Loubert was replaced by Madame de Fontaines, but Madame de Maintenon - more and more present at Saint-Cyr – was recognised as honorary superior in spiritual and temporal charge of the Maison. The Maison then found itself right at the heart of the quietism affair, when Madame Guyon, who was linked in friendship with Madame de Maintenon and welcomed at Saint-Cyr by her from 1689. The example of her ecstasies very quickly influenced the students, worrying Madame de Maintenon - moreover, she was being roundly criticised by the Jansenists, who accused her of allowing heretical thoughts to spread. She ended by sending the mystic away from Saint-Cyr in 1694, before separating herself from Fénelon (who still supported Madame Guyon) in 1696 and withdrawing his books from the Maison. Finally, in 1698, she sent down the last adepts of quietism still present at Saint-Cyr, Madame de la Maisonfort, cousin of Madame Guyon, and Madame du Tourp, putting an end to the quietism affair at Saint-Cyr:

Madame du Tourp was sent by lettre de cachet on 7 August 1698 to the Visitation de Grenoble and Madame de la Maisonfort to the daughters of the Visitation de Meaux. (…) Since this important visit by His Majesty, there were no longer any question of quietism, it was wholly extinct, and the bishop of Chartres took all possible precautions that there remained not the slightest trace of it.

=== Closure ===
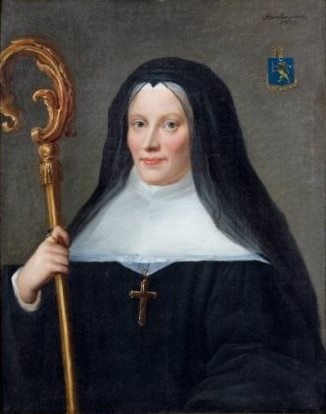
Marguerite de Guillermin, last abbess of Saint Cyr.

On the death of Louis XIV in 1715, Madame de Maintenon retired to Saint-Cyr until her death on 15 April 1719. She was embalmed and buried in the school chapel on 18 August. The Maison continued to function with great discretion, though the death of Madame de Maintenon and the succession of Louis XIV by his great-grandson Louis XV took away the school's fashionable status. Even so, on 6 September 1715, the regent had visited Madame de Maintenon at Saint-Cyr and guaranteed her that all the privileges acquired by the Maison would be maintained.

Under Louis XV, in the absence of Madame de Maintenon, the new ideas of the Maison weakened and the education it provided was criticised, at first by Louis XV himself in the 1730s - he refused to send his daughters to Saint-Cyr. The Mémoires of Madame du Hausset (Paris, 1824) stated "These girls are prudes. (...) They are taught a manner that would make them all ladies of the palace, or they are unhappy and impertinent". In 1750, the marquis d'Argenson even affirmed "We know the establishment at Saint-Cyr is good for nothing. It produces nothing but prudes, who only marry in their provinces or are made to enrage their husbands.

In 1786, Élisabeth de France, sister of Louis XVI, celebrated the centenary of the Maison Royale de Saint-Louis, and a firework display was put on in its courtyard, though Louis XVI did not attend in person, watching it from the terraces at Versailles. The French Revolution and in particular its abolition of the clergy's and nobility's privileges put the Maison's raison d'être into doubt. In compensation, a decree of Louis XVI in 1790 authorised the school to admit non-noble girls, but the Legislative Assembly decreed the school's closure on 16 August 1792, effective from March 1793 with the departure of its personnel and remaining students. From October 1793, the buildings were turned into a military hospital and remained so until 1798. Later, in 1808, when its original buildings proved too small, Napoleon moved his École spéciale militaire de Saint-Cyr there, taking over the old buildings of the Maison Royale, where it remained until the Second World War. Since the second half of the 20th century the buildings of the Maison have been restored and now house the Lycée militaire de Saint-Cyr.

== Influences ==
Even in the lifetime of Madame de Maintenon, many establishments were set up or transformed on the model of the Maison, generally by the Maison's former students. In 1705 one of those students, Madame de la Viefville or Viesville, aged only 28, became abbess of the Bernardine convent at Gomerfontaine, in the diocese of Beauvais, near Trie (present day Trie-Château). She had joined a convent at Argensol on leaving the Maison and the first thing she did on her appointment as abbess was to ask Madame de Maintenon her opinions and for the honour of her protection, in reply to which she began by her sending her Mademoiselle d'Aumale "to help better raise her students and assist in her councils". In 1712, Madame de la Mairie, another alumna of Saint-Cyr, reformed the convent at Bisy on advice from Madame de Maintenon, who wrote to de la Mairie in May that year:

Your design in setting up the same educational system at your house that you have received at Saint-Cyr, at least insofar as it will be possible, gives me the confidence to give you some opinions herein, and to impart to you some of what our experiences have taught.

Both Viefville and Mairie made their establishments give a similar education to that of the Maison, and many other alumnae also became teachers, whilst other alumnae entered convents and passed on the Maison's teaching methods at ground level in all the major convents, which began to take more account of their pupils' teaching and wellbeing rather than putting religious education above all else.

== Bibliography ==
- Bryant, Mark (2004). "Partner, Matriarch, and Minister: Mme de Maintenon of France, Clandestine Consort, 1680-1715". In Campbell Orr, Clarissa (ed.). Queenship in Europe 1660-1815: The Role of the Consort. Cambridge University Press. pp. 77–106. ISBN 0-521-81422-7.
- Chandernagor, Françoise (1981). L'Allée du Roi (in French). Juillard. ISBN 2-260-00260-9.
- Desprat, Jean-Paul (2003). Madame de Maintenon (1635–1719), ou le prix de la réputation (in French). Perrin. ISBN 2-262-01754-9.
- Le Nabour, Éric (2007). La Marquise de Maintenon - L'épouse secrète de Louis XIV (in French). Pygmalion. ISBN 978-2-85704-893-0.
- Prévot, Jacques (1981). La première institutrice de France : Madame de Maintenon (in French). Belin. ISBN 2-7011-0356-8.

== In film ==
- The King's Daughters (released in France as Saint-Cyr) (2000) by Patricia Mazuy
- L'Allée du Roi (1995)

== In music ==
- Famous French baroque composer Marc-Antoine Charpentier wrote Messe pour le Port Royal to be performed in St. Cyr's chapell.

== Notes and references ==
All (in French) unless otherwise noted.
