= Pierre-François Basan =

French engraver, editor and print seller (1723–1797)

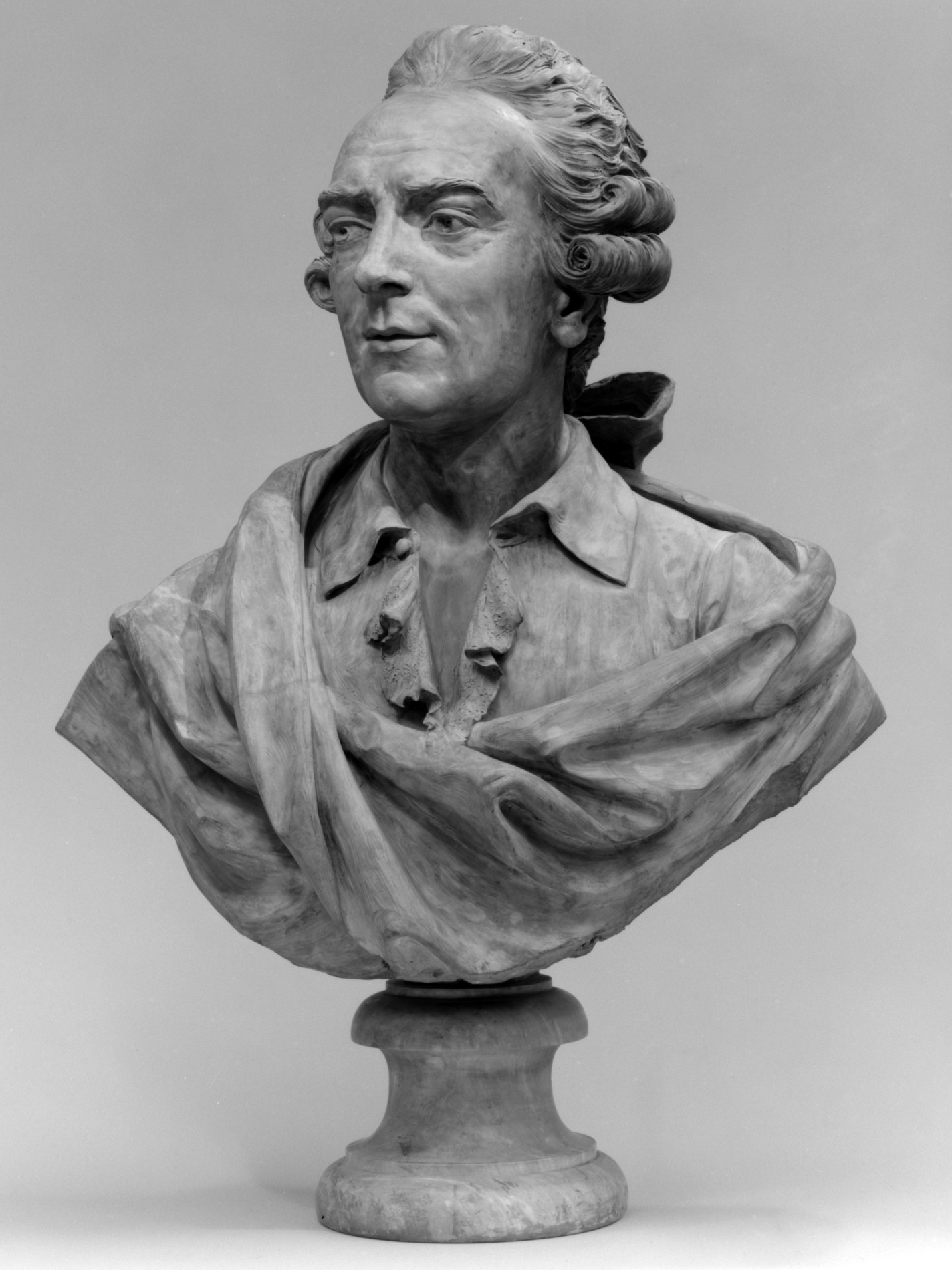
Bust of Pierre-François Basan, by Augustin Pajou, 1773 (20th century copy)

Pierre-François Basan (23 October 1723, Paris - 12 February 1797, Paris) was a French engraver, editor, and print seller.

== Biography ==
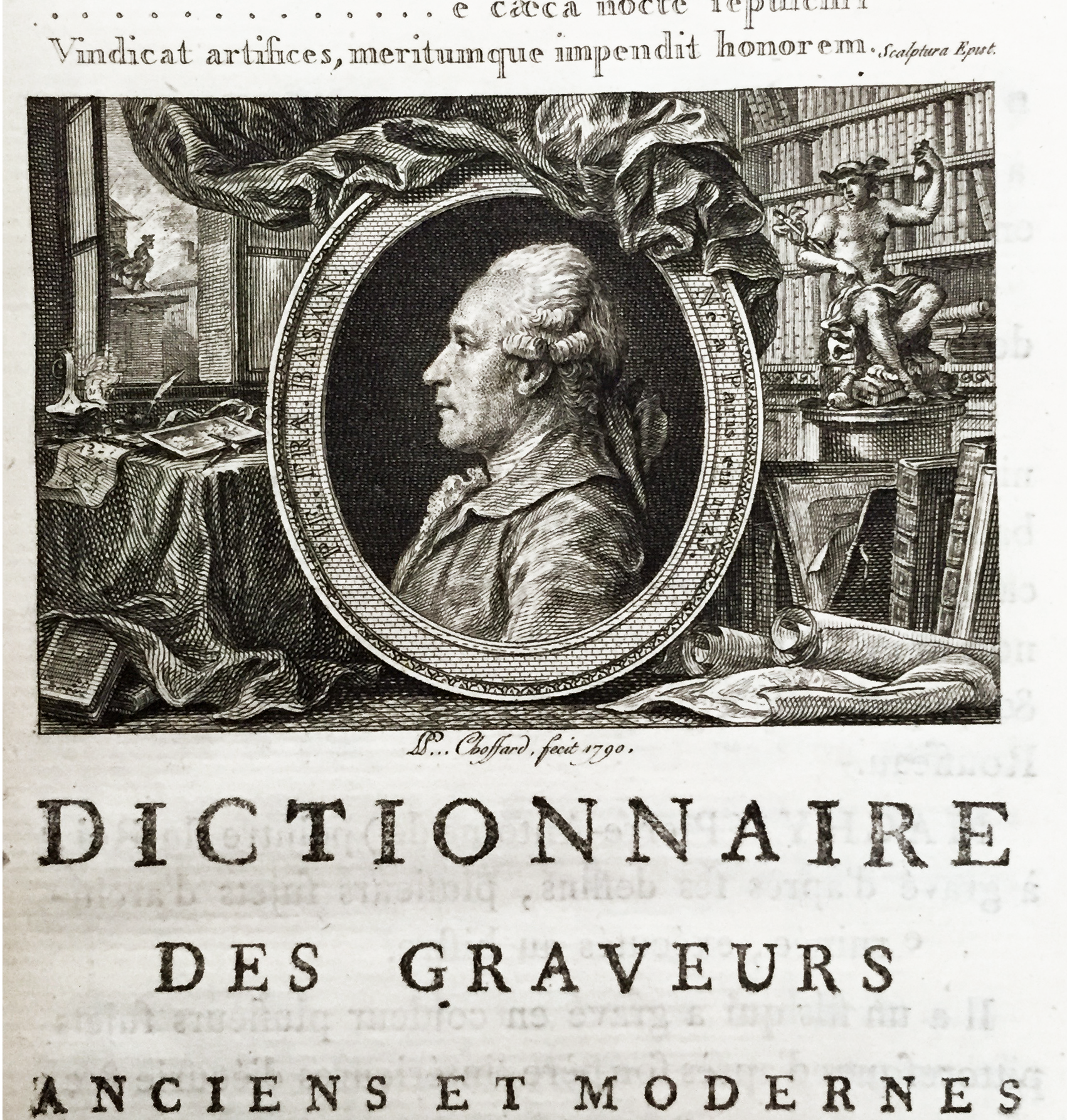
Basan, on the cover of his Dictionary of Engravers

His father, Claude-Pierre Basan, was a wine merchant and his mother, Nicole née Charpizaux, was a cousin of the engraver, Étienne Fessard, who gave him his first drawing lessons. Later, he studied with Jean Daullé.

From 1747, he worked for the print publisher, Michel Odieuvre then, from 1750 to 1754, he was engaged in several large projects, including illustrations for the Histoire Naturelle, by the Comte de Buffon. In 1751, he married Marie Drouet, the orphaned daughter of a hatter from Angers. They had three children. After 1754, he devoted himself almost entirely to the publishing and sale of prints; establishing a European-wide commercial network which operated until 1788. He focused on the younger generation of engravers, rather than the most famous ones.

From 1761 to 1779, he published a series of 650 engravings in six volumes called L’Œuvre de Basan. It consists of his inventory or fonds of engravings after the Old Masters, either by his own hand or produced under his direction. In 1786, he bought seventy-six original brass plates by Rembrandt, from the estate of the collector, Claude-Henri Watelet, and issued them in a deluxe volume. It was reissued for over a century. Though Basan made minimal changes to Rembrandt's copperplates, his son Henri-Louis made significant changes, such as altering the old man's face in A scholar in his study (Faust) to make him appear younger.

Together with Noël Le Mire, from 1767 to 1771 he published an edition of the Metamorphoses by Ovid, in four volumes, which included a biography of the author by Claude-Pierre Goujet, with illustrations by many of France's most notable engravers. He also published two volumes (in quarto format) of prints after paintings from private collections, the Cabinet Choiseul (1771) and the Cabinet Poullain (1781).

The knowledge he acquired in the course of his business made him a much sought-after expert for estate sales, auctions, and the writing of catalogues. In 1767, he published one of the first Dictionary of Engravers, which was revised and reissued in 1789, the year he retired from business; his wife, Marie, having died the year before. His two sons, Antoine-Simon-Ferdinand and Henri-Louis succeeded him and kept his company operating until 1809.

== Notable engravings ==
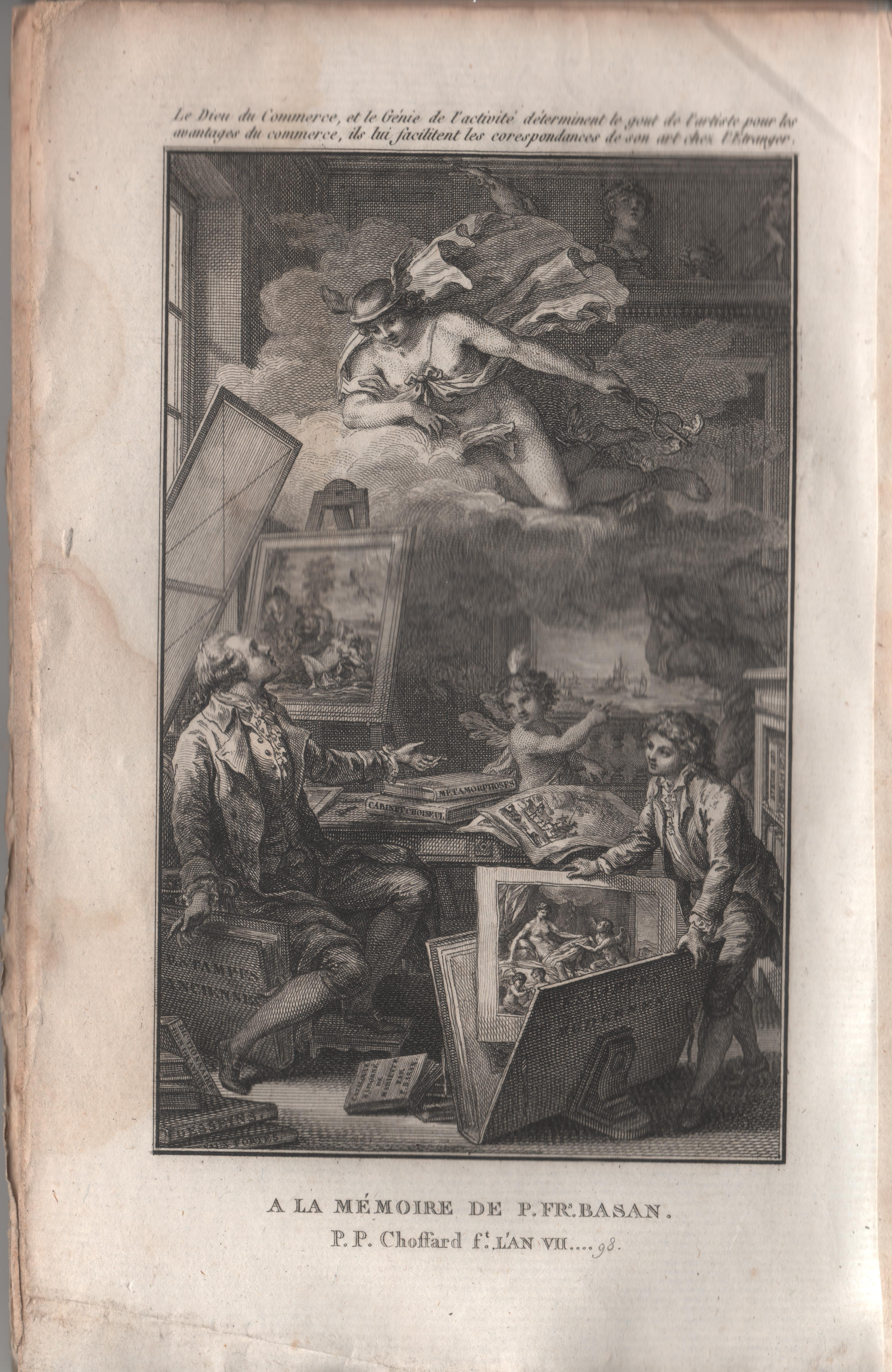
Catalogue raisonné for Basan's estate auction (1798)

- The Gothic Songster; after A. Both.
- An Ecce Homo; after Caravaggio.
- Christ breaking the Bread; after Carlo Dolci.
- St. Maurice; after Luca Giordano.
- Bacchus and Ariadne; after Jordaens.
- Christophe Lemenu de St. Philibert; after Le Fèvre.
- Louis XV, with Diogenes; after Le Moine.
- The Female Gardener; after Frans Mieris.
- The Card-players; after Teniers.
- An Incantation; after the same.
- Carle Vanloo.
- Armand Gaston de Eohan, called the Cardinal de Soubise.
