= Charles d'Aubigné, Comte d'Aubigné =

Charles d'Aubigné, Count of Aubigné (1634–1703) was the brother of Madame de Maintenon, the second wife of King Louis XIV of France.

The king showered gifts and titles upon his new wife's brother (full sibling, she had two, the oldest brother was a half sibling Theodore Agrippa II) upon their marriage; in a letters patent Louis conferred upon him the titles of Comte d'Aubigné et Pair de France, Marquis de Maintenon, Duc de Saint-Cloud, Baron de Surimeau, Maréchal de France et Chevalier du Saint-Esprit (reçu le 31 décembre 1688), along with the style of Son Altesse Serenissime (His Most Serene Highness), a dignity normally reserved only for the Princes of the Blood. While he did not receive his sister's title until her death, the combination of Serenity, being a member of the most prestigious chivalric order in France at that time, the Order of the Holy Spirit put him in a most wonderful position at court.
