= Rosanella =

French fairy tale

"Rosanella" is a French literary fairy tale by the Comte de Caylus (the original French title being Rosanie). Andrew Lang included it in The Green Fairy Book.

== Plot summary ==
The Queen of the Fairies having died, the fairies tried to elect a new one, but there were two candidates they could not choose between. They decided whoever did the greatest wonder would be queen. One, Surcantine, resolved to raise a prince whom nothing could make constant, and the other, Paridamie, a princess whom no one would see without falling in love.

Nearby, King Bardondon and Queen Balanice had an infant daughter, Rosanella. One day the queen dreamed that an eagle had snatched a bouquet of roses from her, and when she woke, the princess had vanished. Soon after, peasant girls brought her twelve baskets, saying they might prove a consolation. Each one contained a beautiful baby girl. This renewed the queen's grief, but she set about providing for them, and this distracted her. She named them, but as they grew, though all were beautiful, intelligent, and accomplished, their dispositions were so clear that they came to be called by them: Sweet, or Grave, or Beautiful.

Meanwhile, Surcantine raised Prince Mirliflor to be perfect in every way except his fickleness, and he broke every heart in his father's kingdom. He went to visit King Bardondon and found himself in love with all twelve of the maidens, but one day giants carried them all off. The prince despaired, but soon after Paridamie appeared with Rosanella, and told the queen that soon she would not miss her twelve maidens. The prince did not want to meet her, but he had to, and found that she combined in herself all the charms of the twelve, and asked her to marry him.

Paridamie appeared, and revealed that the twelve had in fact all been Rosanella, so that they might charm the prince separately and, combined again, cure Mirliflor of his inconstancy. Surcantine owned herself defeated, and even attended the wedding and gave them a gift.
