= Madame de Villette =

French noblewoman

Louise Arthemise d'Aubigné (commonly known as Madame de Villette; 1584 – Mursay, 24 January 1663) was a French noblewoman and aunt of Madame de Maintenon.

== Biography ==
Born as the elder child and only daughter of Théodore Agrippa d'Aubigné Seigneur des Landes et de Chaillou and his wife, Susanne de Lezay Baronne de Surineau (1562–1596).

After the death of her parents, she raised her niece, Françoise d'Aubigné, the future Marquise de Maintenon and second wife of King Louis XIV. She tried to convert Françoise to the Calvinist Reformed Church of France, but this was prevented by her niece's Catholic godmother, Madame de Neuillant.

== Personal life ==
On 22 October 1610 in Maillezais, she married Benjamin Le Valois, Lord of Villette (1582–1661). They had four children:

- Madeleine (1621), married in 1649 Hélie, Marquis de Sainte-Hermine.
- Aymée (1623), married in 1658 René Jouslard de Fontmort.
- Philippe, Marquis de Villette-Mursay (1627–1707), vice-admiral who was highly successful in the Battle of Beachy Head.
- Marie (1633), married in 1659 Marc-Louis de Caumont d’Adde.
