= Lycée militaire de Saint-Cyr =

Military academy in Paris, France

Coordinates: 48°48′03″N 2°03′48″E

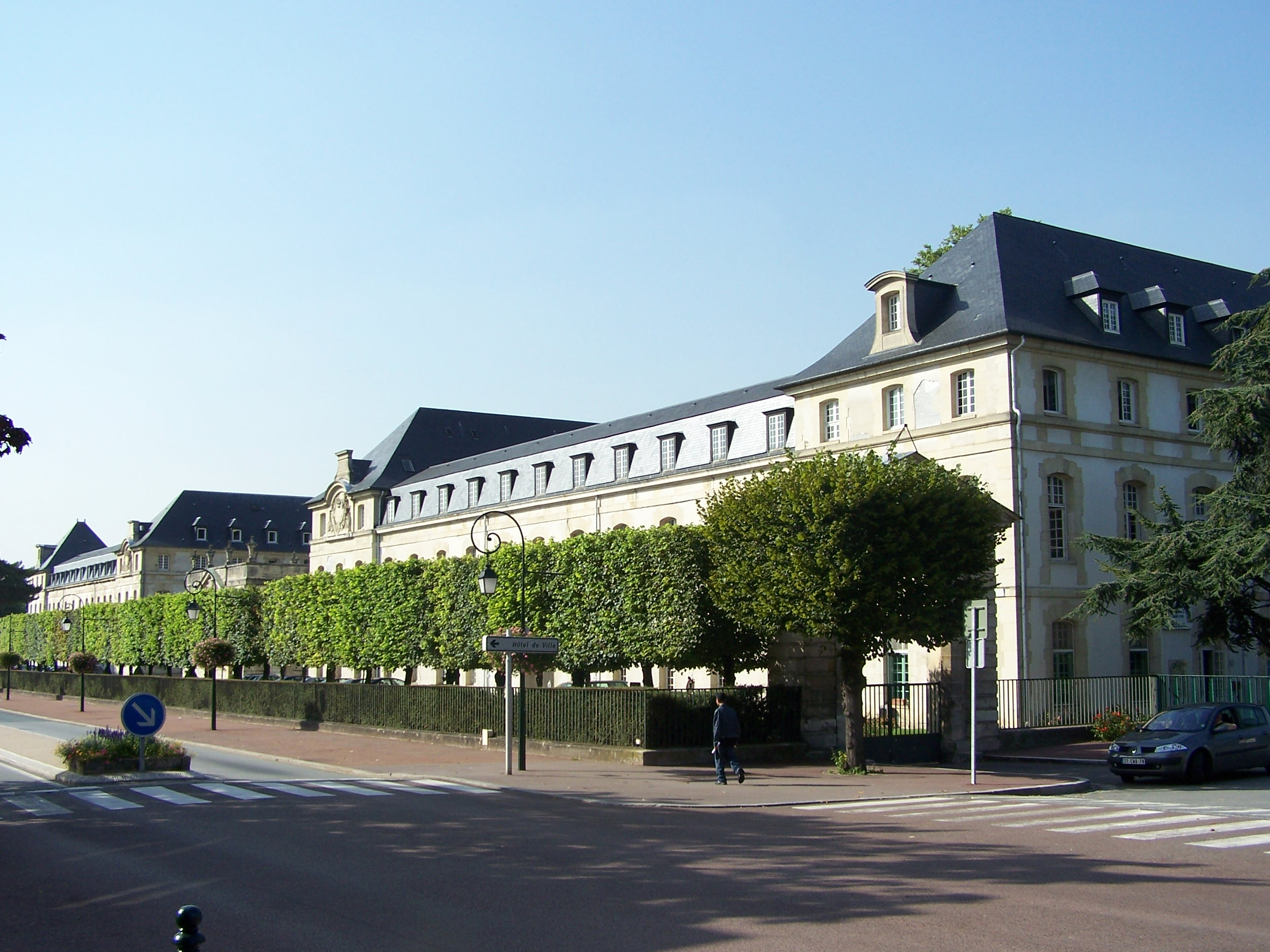
Lycée militaire de Saint-Cyr

The lycée militaire de Saint-Cyr (or Coldo) is one of six lycées de la Défense (formerly 'lycées militaires') of the French Ministry of Defence. Situated at Saint-Cyr-l'École (Yvelines), it occupies a particularly historic building - it succeeds the Maison royale de Saint-Louis, the Prytanée militaire and the École spéciale militaire. The lycée's motto is "La véritable école du commandement est donc la culture générale [The real school of command is therefore general knowledge]".
