= Jean Daullé =

French engraver (1703–1763)

Jean Daulle
- Born: 18 May 1703
- Died: 23 April 1763 (aged 59)
- Spouse: Gabrielle-Anne Landry
- Children: 5
- Parent(s): Jean Daulle; Anne Dennel

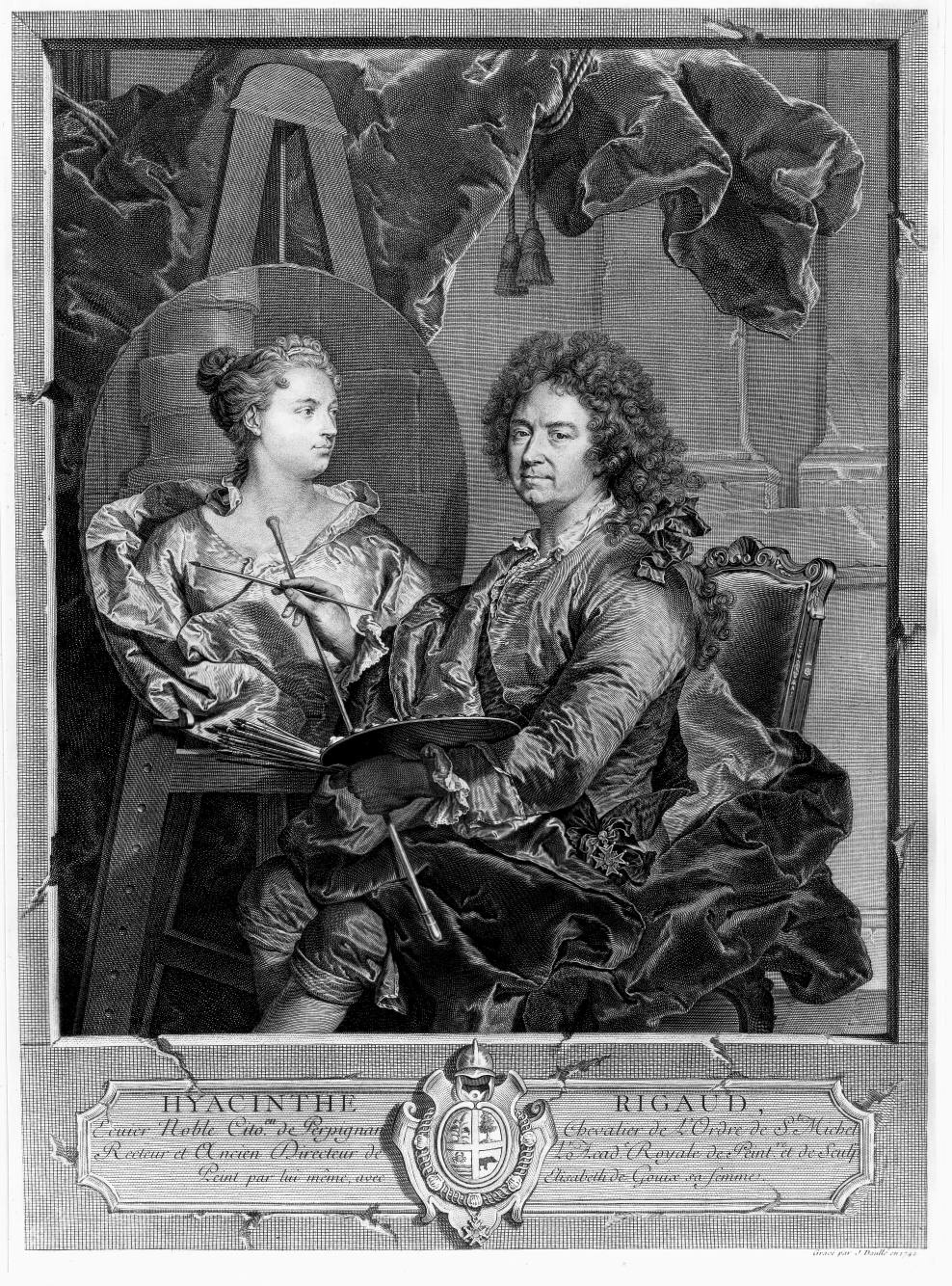
Hyacinthe Rigaud painting his wife, after an autoportrait by Rigaud, 1742

Jean Daullé (18 May 1703 – 23 April 1763) was a French engraver.

== Biography ==
He was the son of Jean Daullé, a silversmith, and his wife, Anne née Dennel. At the age of 14, he received training from an engraver named Robart, at the priory of Saint-Pierre d'Abbeville.

He then went to Paris, and worked at the studios of Robert Hecquet, who was also originally from Picardy. In 1735, his work attracted the attention of the engraver and merchant, Pierre-Jean Mariette, who provided him with professional recommendations. Soon after, he was approached by the painter, Hyacinthe Rigaud, who wanted to make him his official engraver.

In 1742, Daullé was received at the Académie Royale de Peinture et de Sculpture, with his presentation, "Hyacinthe Rigaud Painting his Wife", after a work by Rigaud. He was also admitted as a member of the academy in Augsbourg. Eventually named "Engraver to the King", he trained the future publisher and print dealer, Pierre-François Basan, as well as the German engraver Johann Wille.

Around 1745 he married Gabrielle-Anne Landry and they had five children. Overwhelmed by his large family, his work suffered.

== Work ==
He engraved several portraits and plates of historical and other subjects, which are chiefly executed with the graver in a clear and firm style, which entitles him to rank with the ablest artists of his time. He marked his works J. D. The following are his principal plates:

=== Portraits ===
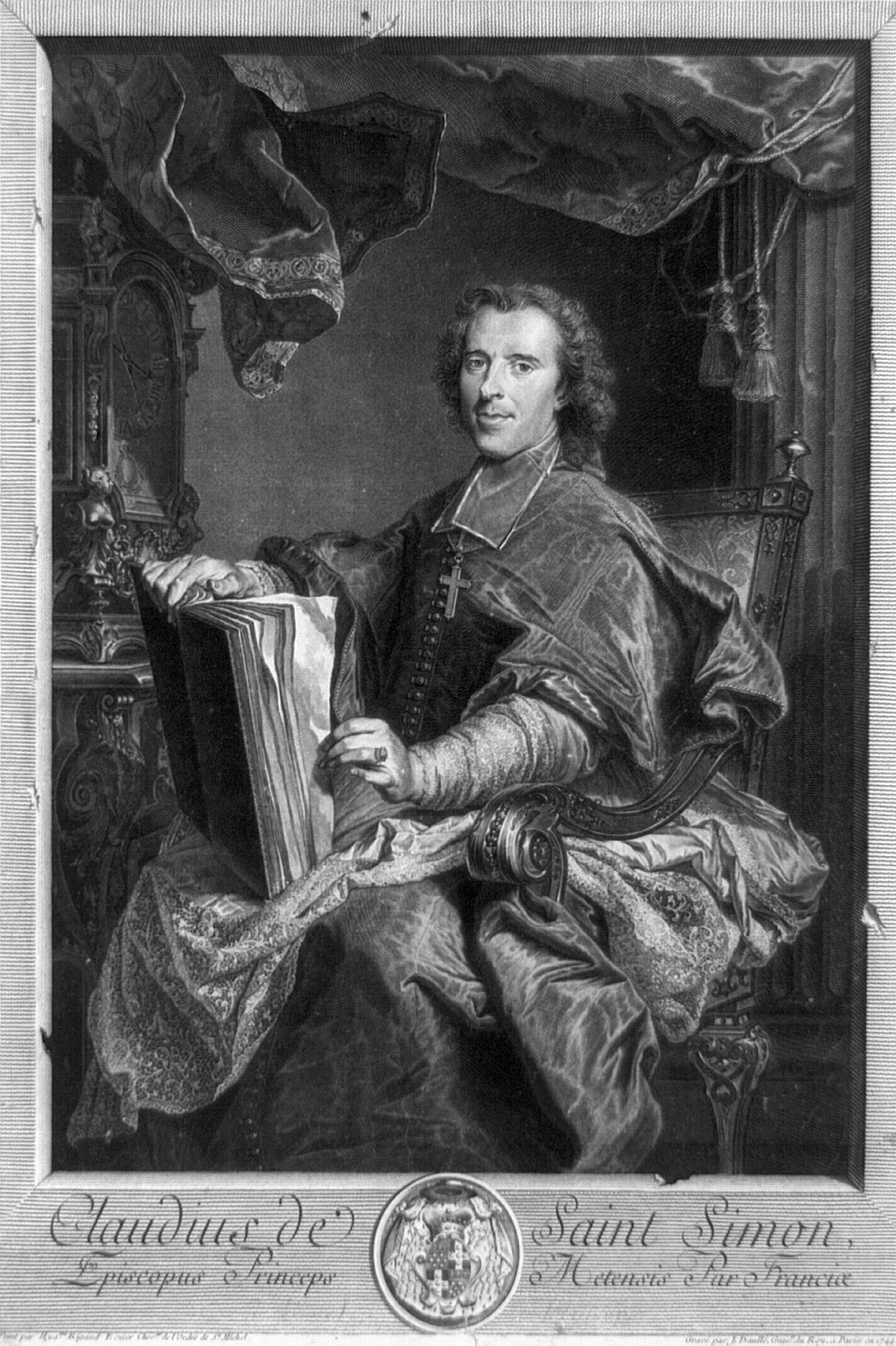
Claude Charles de Rouvroy de Saint-Simon, French bishop, after Hyacinthe Rigaud

- Catherine, Countess of Feuquières, daughter of Pierre Mignard; after Mignard.
- Hyacinthe Rigaud, painter; after Rigaud; engraved for his reception at the Academy in 1742.
- Marguerite de Valois, Countess of Caylus; after the same.
- Charles Edward Stuart, son of the Pretender.
- Clementina, Princess of Poland, his consort; after David.
- Madame Favart, in the part of 'Bastienne;' after Carle van Loo.
- Claude Deshayes Gendron, oculist; after Rigaud.
- Jean Baptiste Rousseau; after Aved.
- Jean Mariette, engraver; after Pesne.

=== Subjects after various masters ===
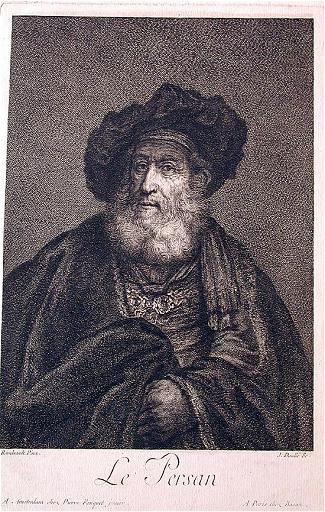
The Persian, after Rembrandt

- The Magdalen; after Correggio; for the Dresden Gallery.
- Diogenes with his Lantern; after Spagnoletto; for the same.
- Quos Ego; after Rubens.
- The Two Sons of Rubens; after the same; for the Dresden Gallery.
- Neptune appeasing the Tempest; after the same.
- Charity with Three Children; after Albani.
- The Triumph of Venus; after Boucher.
- Les Amusemens de la Campagne; after Boucher.
- Latona; after J. Jouvenet.
- Four Marine subjects; after Joseph Vernet.
- The Bath of Venus; after Raoux.
- Two subjects; after G. Metsu.
- Jupiter and Calisto; after N. Poussin.
- St. Margaret; after Correggio.
- Child playing with Cupid; after Van Dyck.

A detailed account of this artist's works is contained in Delignière's 'Catalogue raisonné de l'oeuvre gravé de Jean Daullé d' Abbeville,' 1872, 8vo.
