= Agrippa d'Aubigné =

French poet (1552–1630)

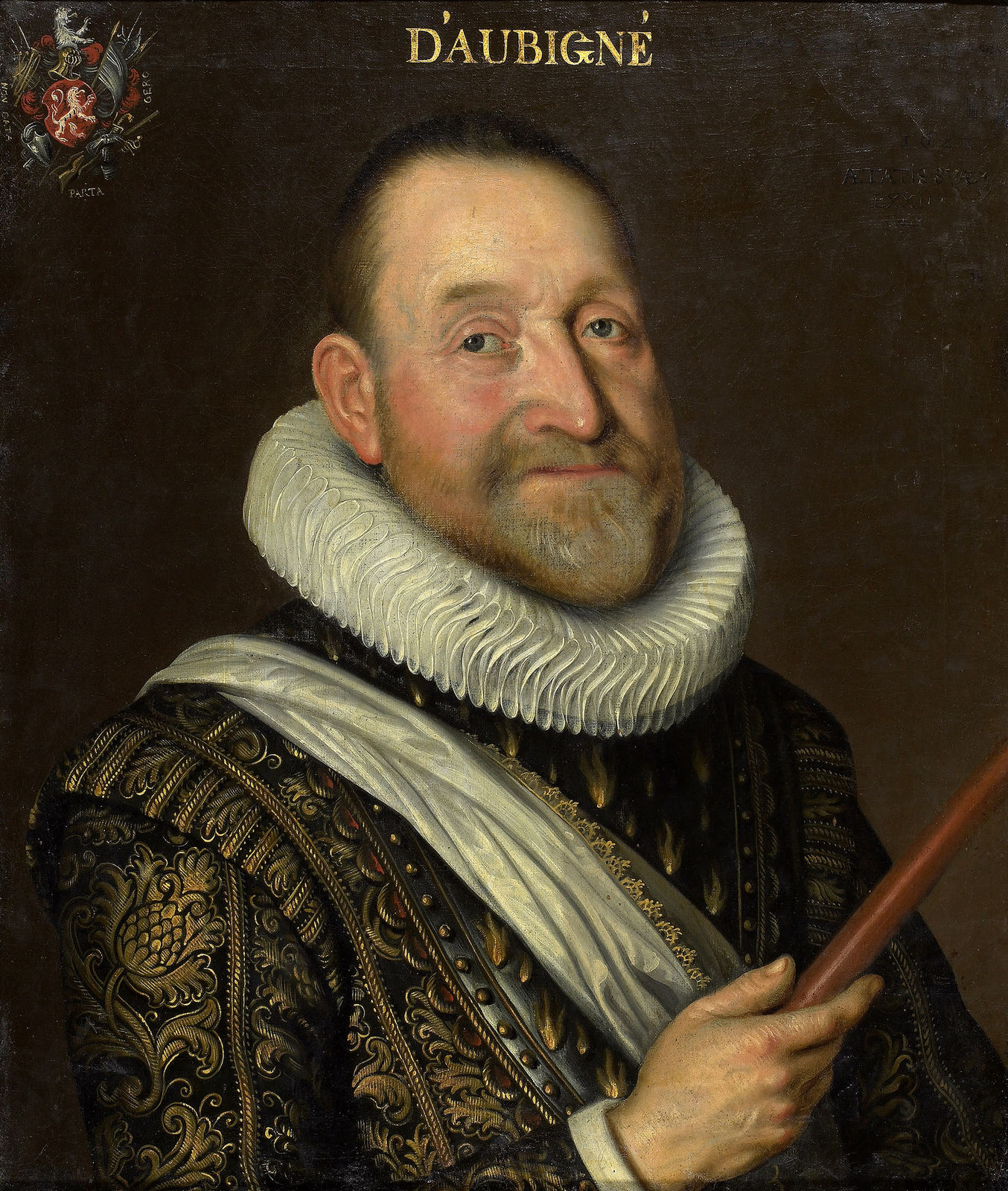
- 1622 portrait
- Born: 8 February 1552; Château de Saint-Maury, Pons, Charente-Maritime, France
- Died: 29 April 1630 (aged 78); Geneva, Switzerland
- Occupations: Poet; soldier
- Writing career
- Period: 17th century
- Genre: Poetry
- Literary movement: Baroque

Théodore-Agrippa d'Aubigné (French pronunciation: [teo.dɔʁ aɡʁipa dobiɲe], 8 February 1552 – 29 April 1630) was a French poet, soldier, propagandist and chronicler. His epic poem Les Tragiques (1616) is widely regarded as his masterpiece. In a book about his Catholic contemporary Jean de La Ceppède, the English poet Keith Bosley called d'Aubigné "the epic poet of the Protestant cause," during the French Wars of Religion. Bosley added, however, that after d'Aubigné's death, he "was forgotten until the Romantics rediscovered him."

== Life ==
Born at the Château of Saint-Maury, near Pons, in present-day Charente-Maritime, his father was Jean d'Aubigné, who was involved in the 1560 Huguenot Amboise conspiracy to seize power by staging a palace coup, kidnapping King Francis II of France, and arresting his Catholic advisors. After the defeat of the plot, d'Aubigné's father strengthened his Calvinist sympathies by showing him, while they were passing through Amboise, the heads of the conspirators exposed on the scaffold, and instructing him not to spare his own head in avenging their deaths.

According to the poet's own account he knew Latin, Greek and Hebrew at six years of age, and he had translated the Crito of Plato before he was eleven.

After a brief residence, d'Aubigné was forced to flee from Paris to avoid arrest, but was captured and threatened with execution. Escaping through the intervention of a friend, he went to Montargis. In his fourteenth year he was present at the siege of Orléans, at which his father was killed.

In 1567 he made his escape from tutelage, and attached himself to the Huguenot army under Louis of Bourbon, Prince of Condé. Aubigné studied in Paris, Orléans, Geneva (under the tutelage of Theodore Beza) and Lyon before joining the Huguenot Henry of Navarre as both soldier and counsellor. After a furious battle at Casteljaloux, and suffering from fever from his wounds, he wrote Tragiques in 1577. He was in the battle of Coutras (1587), and at the Siege of Paris. His career at camp and court, however, was a somewhat chequered one, owing to the roughness of his manner and the keenness of his criticisms, which made him many enemies and severely tried the king's patience. In his tragédie-ballet Circe (1576) he did not hesitate to indulge in the most outspoken sarcasm against the king and other members of the royal family.

Henry's accession to the throne of France required his conversion to the Roman Catholic Church and Aubigné left his service to tend to his own Poitou estates, even though more moderate Huguenots welcomed King Henry's decree of religious toleration, the Edict of Nantes. However, d'Aubigné never entirely lost the favour of the King, who made him governor of Maillezais. d'Aubigné remained an uncompromising advocate of the Huguenot interests. The first two volumes of the work by which he is best known, his Histoire universelle depuis 1550 jusqu'à l'an 1601, appeared in 1616 and 1618 respectively.

When Marie de' Medici became regent following King Henry's assassination in 1610, she embraced the Counter-Reformation. The third volume was published in 1619, but, being still more free and personal in its attacks against the Monarchy than those which had preceded it, the book was banned and ordered to be burned by the executioner.

Aubigné was outlawed in 1620 and fled to Geneva where he lived for the rest of his life, though the Queen Mother arranged for a sentence of death to be recorded against him more than once for high treason. Aubigné devoted the period of his exile to study, and supervising the fortifications of Bern and Basel which were designed as a defence of the Republic of Geneva against the Crown of France.

During the 1627–1628 Siege of La Rochelle, the poet's eldest son and heir, Constant d'Aubigné, leaked the plans of King Charles I of England and the Duke of Buckingham to send an English fleet to aid the city's Huguenot rebels to Cardinal Richelieu, the Minister of State to King Louis XIII. As a result, Constant d'Aubigné was disowned and disinherited by his father.

== Legacy ==
His daughter, Madame de Villette, was born in 1584 at Mursay to Suzanne de Lusignan de Lezay; at an early age, on 22 October 1610, she married Benjamin Valois de Vilette in Maillezais.

Through Louise, the poet's grandson was Philippe, Marquis de Villette-Mursay, who became an Admiral in the French Navy and whose children were, to his outrage, converted to Catholicism by their cousin Madame de Maintenon in 1681.

Several years after being disowned by his father, Constant d'Aubigné was imprisoned by the Cardinal for corresponding with the English Court. During his imprisonment, Constant married Jeanne de Cardilhac, the daughter of his jailer. All of their children were baptized and raised in the Roman Catholic Church at their mother's insistence.

Constant d'Aubigné's daughter and the Poet's granddaughter, Madame de Maintenon, became first the mistress and then the second wife to King Louis XIV.

The poet's great-granddaughter Françoise Charlotte d'Aubigné married Adrien Maurice de Noailles, the heir to the Duke of Noailles, in 1698. Through Françoise, Agrippa d'Aubigné's descendants include Hélie, Duke of Noailles (born 1943), Adrienne de Noailles (1759–1807), who married the famous Marquis de Lafayette, and King Philippe of Belgium (born 1960).

"From the Saddle (D'Aubigné to Diane)"

Wearied by wind and wave death goes
With gin and snare right near alway
Unto my sight. Behind me bay
As hounds the tempests of my foes.
Ever on ward against such woes,
Pistols my pillow's service pay,
Yet Love makes me the poet play.
Thou know’st the rime demands repose,
So if my line disclose distress,
The soldier and my restlessness
And teen, Pardon, dear Lady mine,
For since mid war I bear love's pain
‘Tis meet my verse, as I, show sign,
Of powder, gun-match and sulphur stain.
.

— Ezra Pound

The poet's younger son Theodore d'Aubigné (1613–1670) continued on the d'Aubigné line.

The members of the d'Aubigné family who remained Protestant eventually emigrated in the late 1680s and avoided the Monarchy's crackdown on Huguenots who remained in France. Later, by 1715, many of them had settled near Falls Church, Virginia, and had changed their name to Dabney.

Since the rediscovery of d'Aubigné and his poetry by the Romantics, the Huguenot soldier-poet has been translated from Middle French to Polish by Nobel Prize-winning poet Wisława Szymborska and has inspired the English-language poet Ezra Pound.

Charles Baudelaire took an excerpt from Les Tragiques as epigraph to Les Fleurs du mal.

== Literary and historical works ==
- Histoire universelle (1616–1618)
- Les Tragiques (1616)
- Avantures du Baron de Faeneste
- Confession catholique du sieur de Sancy
- Sa Vie à Ses Enfants

=== Les Tragiques ===
Written over some three decades, the alexandrine verse of this epic poem relies on multiple genres as well as stylistic familiarity with the work of the opposing, Catholic poets of the Pléiade, headed by Pierre de Ronsard. Divided into seven books, a number symbolic of the author's ultimate, apocalyptic intent, the Tragiques incorporates literary influence from classical sources, such as tragedy and satire, palpable in the first three books ("Les Misères", "Les Princes", and "La Chambre Dorée" respectively), before resorting to influence from genres like ecclesiastical history, martyrology and apocalypse in the creation of the remaining books ("Les Feux", "Les Fers", "Vengeances", and "Jugement").

In the first of two liminal paratexts, the introduction "Aux Lecteurs," Aubigné endorses the account (also found in his autobiographical Sa Vie à Ses Enfants), that the inception of the Tragiques came to him as an ecstatic vision during a near-death experience. In the second, "L'Auteur À Son Livre," d'Aubigné adopts the metaphor of father as author to name the text that follows (Les Tragiques) as a more pious son than the less religious works of his youth (cf.: Le Printemps). The intent of the epic is subsequently spelled out as an attack against the Catholic poets of the Pléiade and their patrons in the midst of the religious wars.

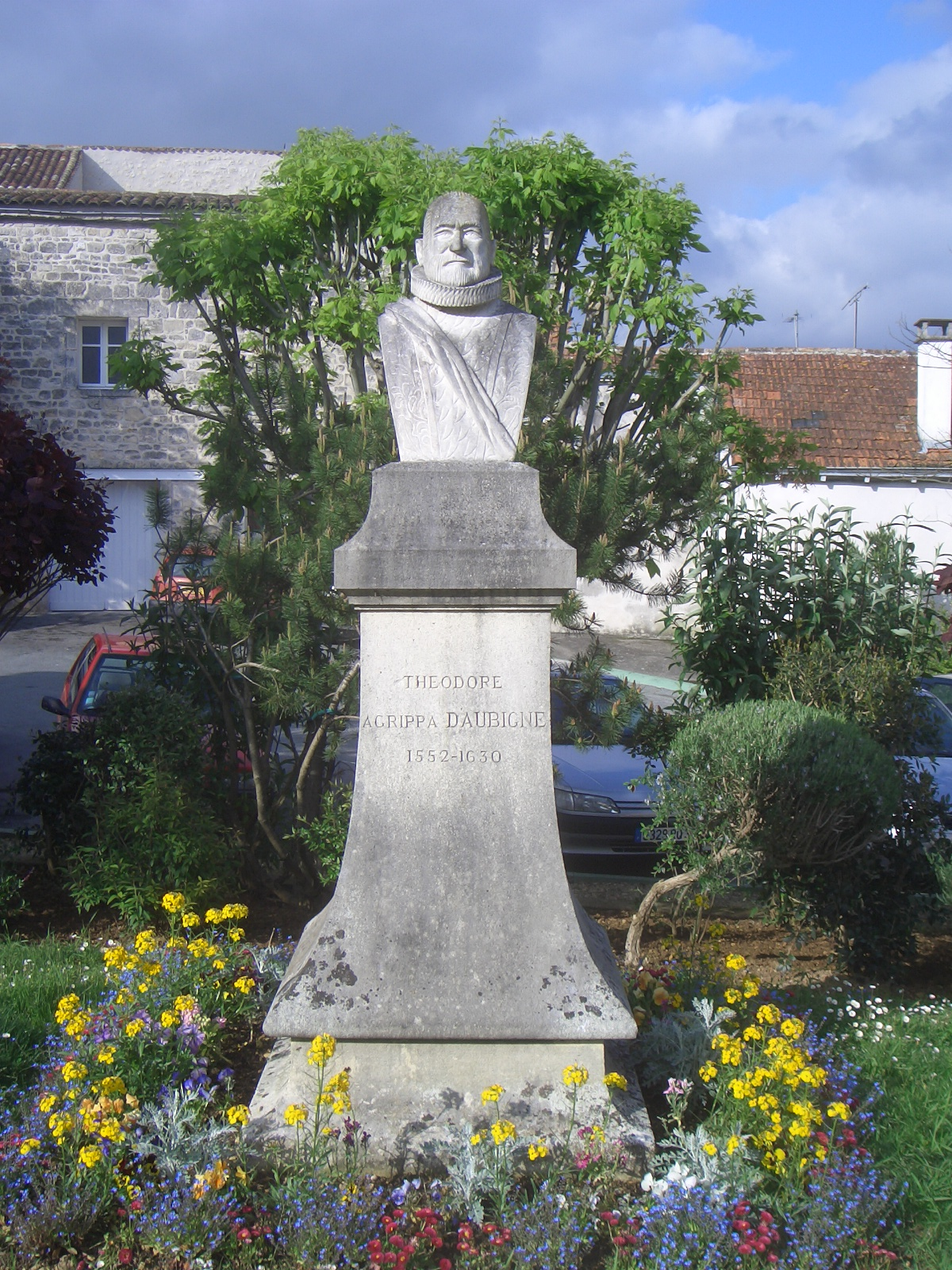
Bust of Théodore Agrippa d'Aubigné in Pons

== See also ==
- Henri IV's white plume
- Hardouin de Péréfixe de Beaumont
