= Charles Nisard =

French writer and critic

Charles Nisard (10 January 1808 – 16 July 1890) was a French writer and critic, and member of the Institut. He was born in Châtillon-sur-Seine, and was brother of the writer Désiré Nisard (see family memorial online).
