= Philippe, Marquis de Villette-Mursay =

French naval commander (1627–1707)

Philippe Marquis de Villette-Mursay (1627 – 25 December 1707) was a French naval commander.

== Biography ==
He was born in Normandy as the son of Benjamin de Villette (1582–1661) and Louise Arthémise d’Aubigné. Françoise d'Aubigné, the future marquise de Maintenon and second wife of Louis XIV, was his cousin. She lived in his parents' home, the Château de Mursay, and received a Calvinist upbringing until the age of seven.

After a disappointing career in the Army, Villette-Mursay chose a career in the young French navy under Colbert. In 1672 he was promoted to captain and received in 1674 command of his own ship, l'Apollon.

Villette-Mursay first distinguished himself on 8 January 1676 in the Battle of Stromboli against De Ruyter, commanding L'Assuré. He again fought in a pitched battle a few months later near Agosta.

In 1680, he sailed to the Caribbean Sea as captain of Les Jeux in the fleet of Jean II d'Estrées. Upon his return to France, in March 1681, he learned, to his fury, that his children had converted to Roman Catholicism under the influence of Madame de Maintenon. He himself remained a Huguenot, which did his career no good.

Finally, the pressure became too great and Villette-Mursay himself converted to Catholicism, with immediate consequences. In 1686 he was promoted to squadron-leader and in 1689 to lieutenant-general. In 1697, he received the Order of Saint-Louis.

In the War of the Grand Alliance, he commanded a squadron in the Battle of Beachy Head, in which he finished off nine or ten beached Dutch ships.

In the Battles of Barfleur and La Hogue, he commanded as vice-admiral a division of six ships: L'Ambitieux, Le Courageux, La Couronne, Le Maure, Le Henry, and Le Fort. He was forced to burn L'Ambitieux and Le Fort to avoid capture.

Villette-Mursay's last naval encounter was at the Battle of Málaga, in which he commanded the vanguard in direct confrontation with Sir Cloudesley Shovell. Villette's ship Le Fier caught fire, and suffered 100 killed and wounded, but was finally saved.

== Marriage and children ==
In 1662, he married Marie-Anne de Chateauneuf, who died in 1691.
In 1695 he married the twenty-years-old Marie-Claire Deschamps de Marsilly, who died in 1750.

He had four children with his first wife :

- Constance, married 1724 Jean-Baptiste, Marquis de Montmorin-Saint Hérem.
- Philippe II (1667–1706), Marquis De Mursay de Villette, married 1695 Marie-Louise Le Moyne de Villiers, killed in the Siege of Turin.
- Henri-Benjamin (1670–1692), married Madeleine de Beaumont de Gibaud, died of his wounds after the Battle of Steenkerque.
- Marthe (1673–1729), Marquise de Caylus, married 1686 Anne, Comte de Caylus.

He wrote his memoirs -: Mes campagnes de mer sous Louis XIV — avec un dictionnaire des personnages et des batailles (Tallandier, Paris, 1991)
