= The King's Way (novel) =

1981 novel by Françoise Chandernagor

L'Allée du Roi (English: "The Avenue of The King") by Françoise Chandernagor

The King's Way (French: L'Allée du Roi) is a novel by the French author Françoise Chandernagor, first published in 1981. It is the story of Françoise d'Aubigné, marquise de Maintenon, who in the 17th century was almost the queen of France. It follows her story from her birth in a prison in Niort and her poor childhood, to a marriage to a disabled poet, and her life in the court of Louis XIV, King of France, where she became his companion and finally his wife.

The book is said to have caused a resurgence of interest in Madame de Maintenon and a better understanding of her character. Kirkus Reviews described it as "a rich, stylish, authentic impersonation".

== Television film ==
The TV-film with the same title “L'allée Du Roi”was released in French in 1996. It has a playtime of 4 hours.

- Director: Nina Companéez
- Writers: Françoise Chandernagor (novel), Nina Companéez
- Stars: Dominique Blanc, Mauricio Buraglia, and Didier Sandre
