= Constant d'Aubigné =

French nobleman

- Born: 1585; France
- Died: August 31, 1647 (aged 61–62); Provence, France
- Occupations: Nobleman, Governor of Marie-Galante
- Known for: Father of Madame de Maintenon
- Spouses: Anne Marchant (m. 1608; d. 1619); Isabelle Jeanne de Cardilhac (m. 1627)
- Children: Théodore d'Aubigné; Constant d'Aubigné; Charles, comte d'Aubigné; Françoise d'Aubigné
- Parents: Théodore-Agrippa d'Aubigné (father); Suzanne de Lusignant de Lezay (mother)

Constant d'Aubigné (French pronunciation: [kɔ̃stɑ̃ dobiɲe]; 1585 – 31 August 1647) was a French nobleman, son of Théodore-Agrippa d'Aubigné, the poet, soldier, propagandist and chronicler.

== Life ==
Born into a Huguenot family, Constant led a less structured life, first embracing Protestantism and then the Catholic causes, visiting England and then in 1626 betraying the Protestants by revealing English plans to take La Rochelle. As a result, he was disinherited by his father.

== Final days ==
Richelieu had d'Aubigné and his family imprisoned at Niort in 1629 for correspondence with the English. Released in 1639 following the death of Richelieu, the family went to the French West Indies, where d'Aubigné had been made governor of Marie-Galante, though he and his family remained on Martinique. d'Aubigné returned around 1645, nearly destitute, and died in Provence in 1647. His wife and children returned to France the same year.

== Legacy ==
Constant was twice married. His first wife, Anne Marchant, whom he married on 20 October 1608, in La Rochelle, she was the widow of Jean Courant, baron and lord of Chastelaillon, and she left a son, Theodore (baptized 9 August 1609). Constant's marriage to Anne Marchant ended in 1619 when he murdered her and another resident at a hostel in attempts to inherit her family fortune. His second wife, Jeanne de Cardilhac, was the mother of Charles (father of Françoise Charlotte d'Aubigné), Mme. de Maintenon and the Chevalier d'Aubigné; the latter was never married. The d'Aubigné line was continued through Anne Marchant's son, Theodore (1613–1670).

== Resources ==
- Haag, Eugéne & Émile. "La France Protestante". Paris, 1877.
- Smedes, Susan Dabney. "A Southern Planter: Social Life in the Old South". Pott, 1887; p. 7,8
- Bellet, Jaquelin & Jaquelin. "Some Prominent Virginia Families". J.P. Bell company, 1907; pp. 87–93
