= Françoise d'Aubigné, Marquise de Maintenon =

Morganatic wife of Louis XIV (1635–1719)

Madame Françoise d'Aubigné
- Marquise of Maintenon
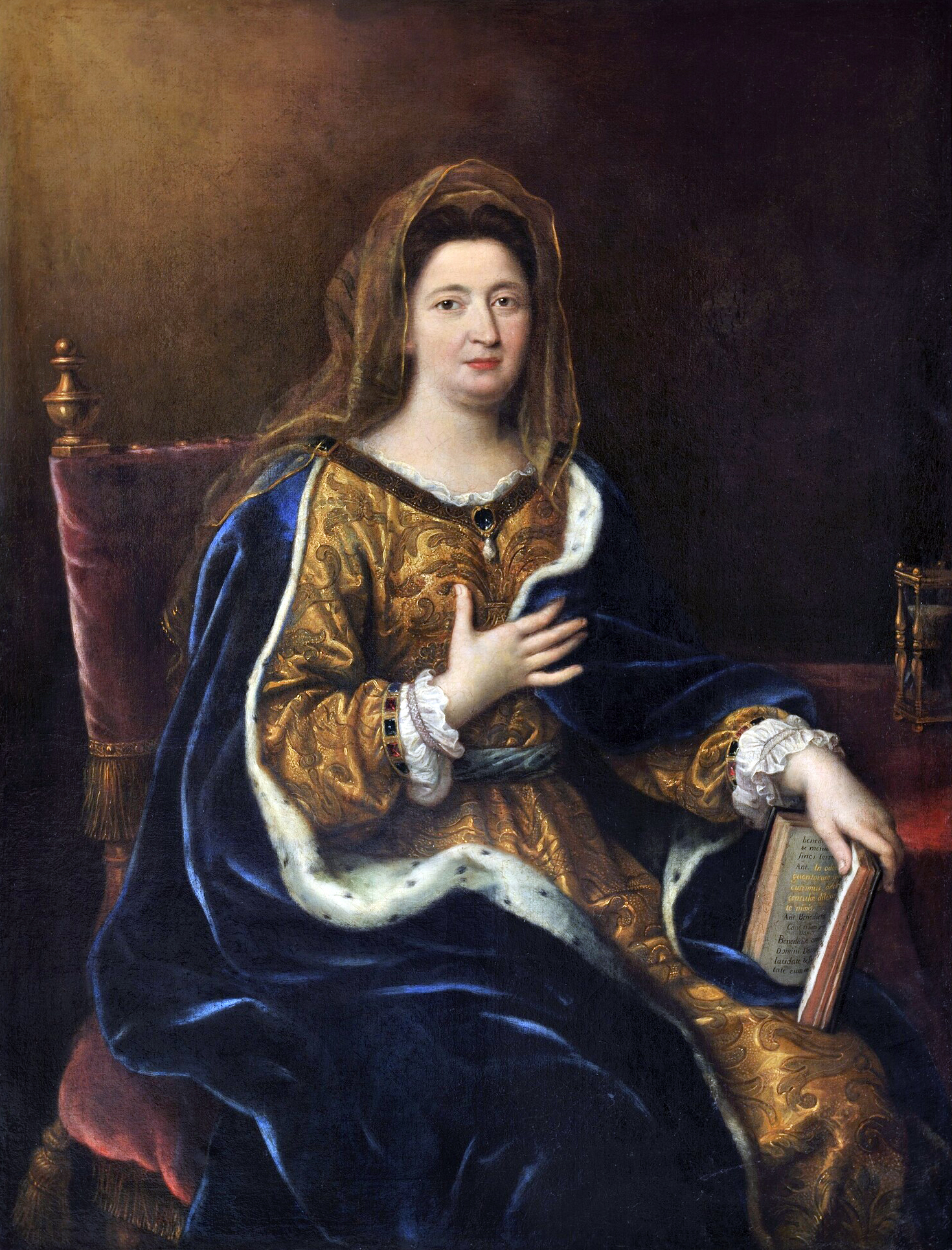
- Portrait by Pierre Mignard, 1694
- Born: 27 November 1635; Niort, France
- Died: 15 April 1719 (aged 83); Saint-Cyr-l'École, France
- Noble family: d'Aubigné
- Spouses: Paul Scarron (m. 1652; died 1660) Louis XIV (secretly) (m. 1683; died 1715)
- Father: Constant d'Aubigné
- Mother: Jeanne de Cardilhac

Françoise d'Aubigné (27 November 1635 – 15 April 1719), known first as Madame Scarron and subsequently as Madame de Maintenon (French: [madam də mɛ̃t(ə)nɔ̃]), was a French noblewoman and the second wife of King Louis XIV from 1683 until his death in 1715. Although she was never considered queen of France, as the marriage was carried out in secret, Madame de Maintenon had considerable political influence as one of the King's closest advisers and the governess of the royal children.

Born into an impoverished Huguenot noble family, Françoise married the poet Paul Scarron in 1652, which allowed her access to the Parisian high society. She was widowed in 1660, but later saw her fortunes improve through her friendship with Louis XIV's mistress, Madame de Montespan, who tasked her with the upbringing of the king's extramarital children. She was made royal governess when the children were legitimised, and in 1675 Louis XIV granted her the title Marquise de Maintenon. By the late 1670s, she had essentially supplanted Montespan as the king's maîtresse-en-titre.

After the death of Queen Maria Theresa in 1683, Madame de Maintenon married Louis in a private ceremony. She came to be regarded as the second most powerful person in France, and her piety had a strong influence on her husband, who became firmer in his Catholic faith and had no more known mistresses. In 1686, she founded the Maison royale de Saint-Louis, a school for girls from impoverished noble families, which had a significant influence on female education under the Ancien Régime. After Louis XIV's death in 1715, Madame de Maintenon retired to Saint-Cyr, where she died four years later at the age of 83.

== Childhood ==
=== Birth at Niort ===
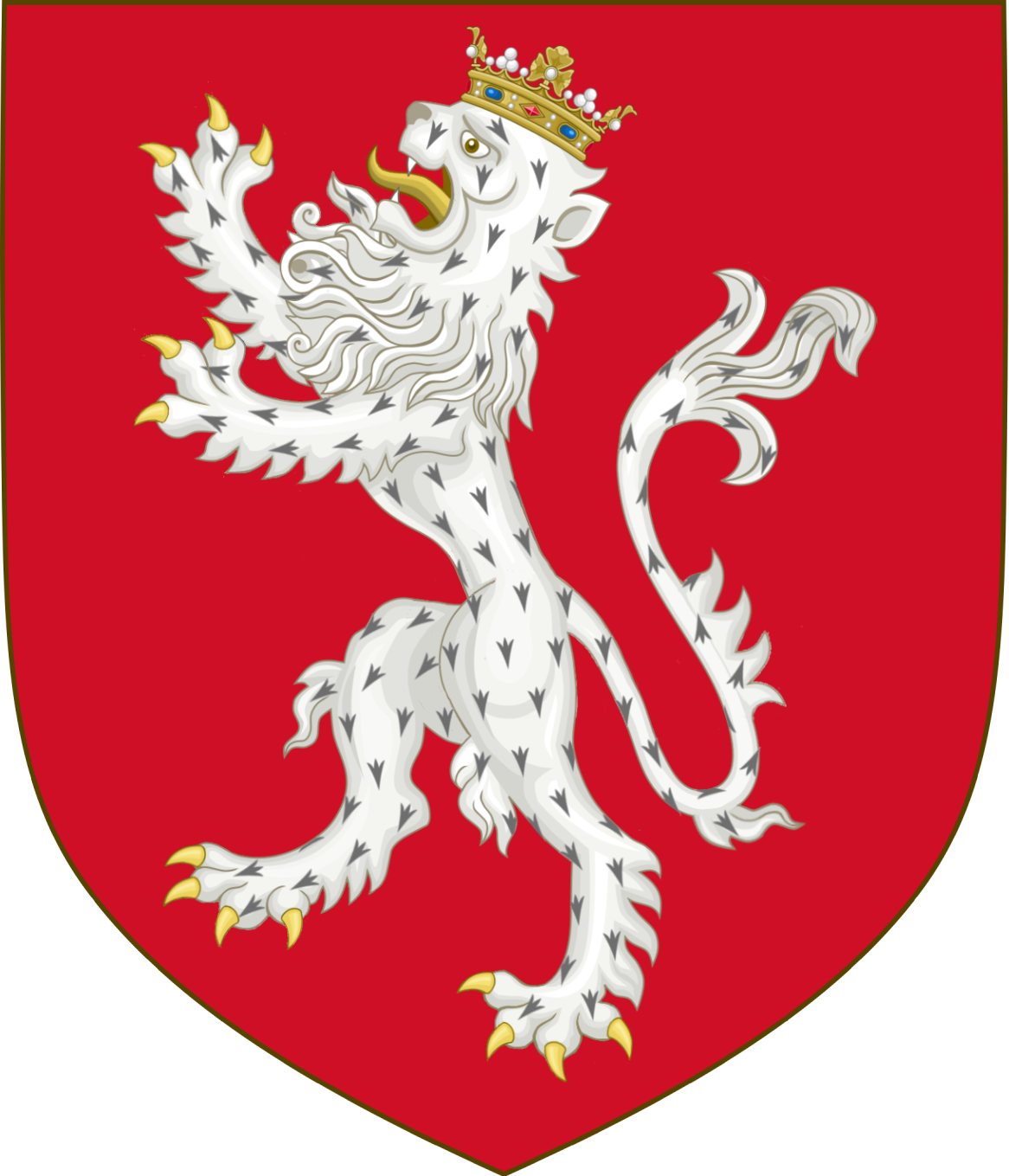
d'Aubigné Coat-of-Arms

Françoise d'Aubigné was born on 27 November 1635, in Niort, France. A plaque suggests her birthplace was at the Hotel du Chaumont, but some sources indicate she was born in or just outside the local prison, where her Huguenot father Constant d'Aubigné was incarcerated for conspiring against King Louis XIII's powerful chief minister, Cardinal Richelieu. Her mother, Jeanne de Cardilhac, was the daughter of the prison director and was probably seduced by the incarcerated Constant. She was a fervent Catholic and had her child baptised in her religion. Her paternal grandfather was Agrippa d'Aubigné, a former intimate servant of the late king Henry IV well known for his roles as Protestant general and propagandist. Her godmother was the nine-year-old Suzanne de Baudéan, daughter of the comtesse de Neuillant and the governor of Niort, and her godfather was the duc de La Rochefoucauld, father of François de La Rochefoucauld, the author of the famous Maxims.

=== Protestant upbringing ===
In 1639, Constant was released from prison and went with Jeanne and Françoise to the French island colony of Martinique in the West Indies. Jeanne was a strict mother, allowing her children few liberties. She gave them a Protestant education despite their Catholic baptism. Constant returned to France, leaving his family behind in Martinique, causing Jeanne to try to be "mother and father" to their children until they also returned to France, in 1647. Within months of the family's return, both parents died, and the children went to the care of their paternal aunt, Madame de Villette. The Villettes' home, Mursay, became a happy memory for Françoise, who had been in the care of her aunt and uncle before leaving for Martinique. The de Villettes were wealthy and took good care of the children, but were ardent Protestants and continued to school their nieces and nephews in their beliefs. When this became known to the family of Françoise's godmother, an order was issued that she had to be educated in a convent.

=== Education ===
Françoise disliked convent life, mainly because she received only limited education and freedom. Her lessons included basic mathematics, French, Latin, and domestic work. The main emphasis was on religion and liturgy, with no opening onto the secular world. Despite her disgust, Françoise grew to love one of the nuns there, Sister Céleste, who persuaded the young girl to receive her first communion. In her older days, Maintenon would say, "I loved [Sister Céleste] more than I could possibly say. I wanted to sacrifice myself for her service." Françoise would also prove adept in the art of writing, going on to send more than 90,000 letters in her lifetime.

Madame de Neuillant, the mother of Françoise's godmother, then brought the girl to Paris and introduced her to sophisticated people, who became vital contacts that she would use in the future.

== Arrival at the court ==
=== Marriage ===
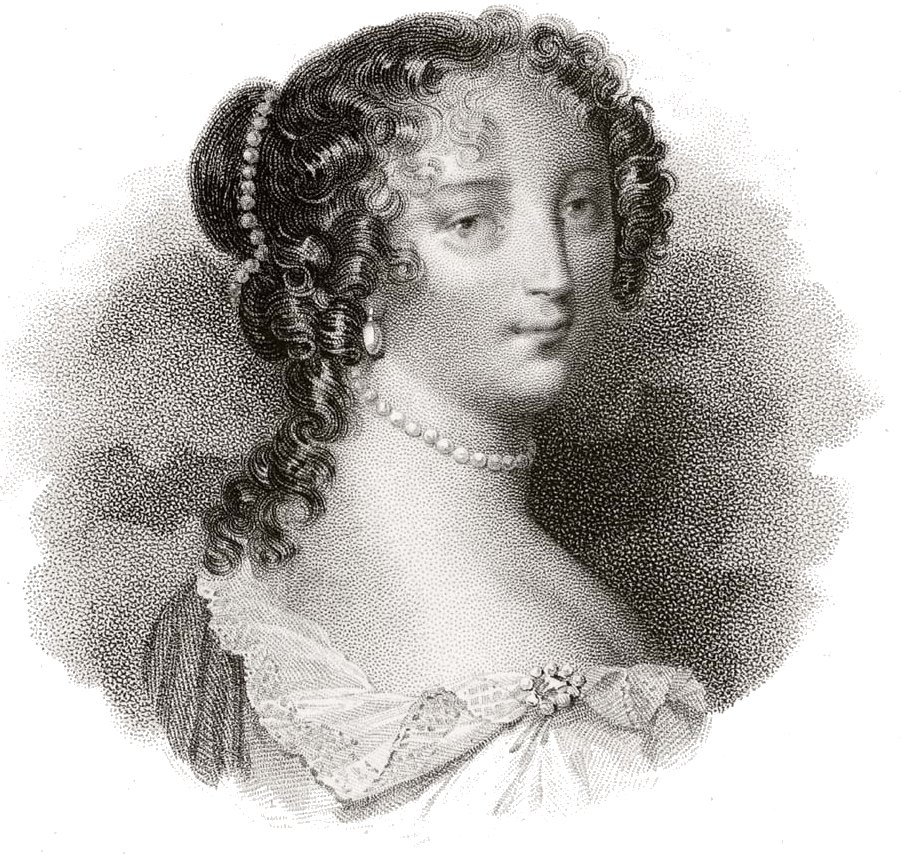
Mme de Scarron

In her excursion with Madame de Neuillant, Françoise met accomplished poet Paul Scarron, who was 25 years her senior, and began to correspond with him. He counted King Louis XIII's favourites among his patrons and offered her marriage or to pay her dowry so that she might enter a convent. Although Scarron suffered from chronic and crippling pain, Françoise accepted his proposal and the two married in 1652. The match permitted her to gain access to the highest levels of Parisian society, something that would have otherwise been impossible for a girl from an impoverished background. For nine years, she was more a nurse than a wife to Paul who, in turn, gave her exposure to education and a vocation as a teacher.

=== Royal governess ===
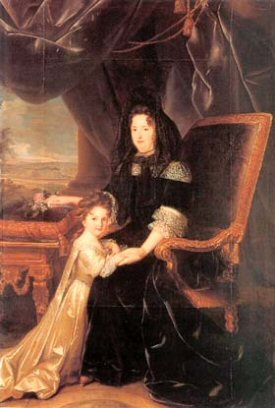
Madame de Maintenon with her niece, Françoise Amable d'Aubigné.

After Paul Scarron's death in 1660, the Queen Mother Anne of Austria continued his pension to his widow and even increased it to 2,000 livres a year, thus enabling Françoise to remain in literary society. After his mother's death in 1666, Louis XIV suspended the pension. Once again in straitened circumstances and having spent several years living off the charity of her friends, Madame Scarron prepared to leave Paris for Lisbon as a lady-in-waiting to the new queen of Portugal, Marie-Françoise de Nemours. Before setting off, however, she met Madame de Montespan, who was secretly already the king's mistress. Montespan took such a fancy to Scarron that she had the king reinstate her pension, which enabled the latter to stay in Paris.

In 1669, Madame de Montespan placed her second child by Louis XIV with Madame Scarron in a house on Rue de Vaugirard, provided with a large income and staff of servants. Scarron took care to keep the house well-guarded and discreet, doing many duties as secretary and caretaker. Her care for the infant Louis Auguste, Duke of Maine (born 1670) first brought her to the attention of Louis XIV, though he was initially repelled by her strong temper and strict religious practice. After Louis Auguste and his siblings were legitimised on 20 December 1673, she moved to the Château de Saint-Germain and became the Governess of the Children of France, one of the very few people permitted to speak candidly with the king as an equal. Madame de Sévigné observed that Louis XIV was charmed by having someone who would speak to him in this way.

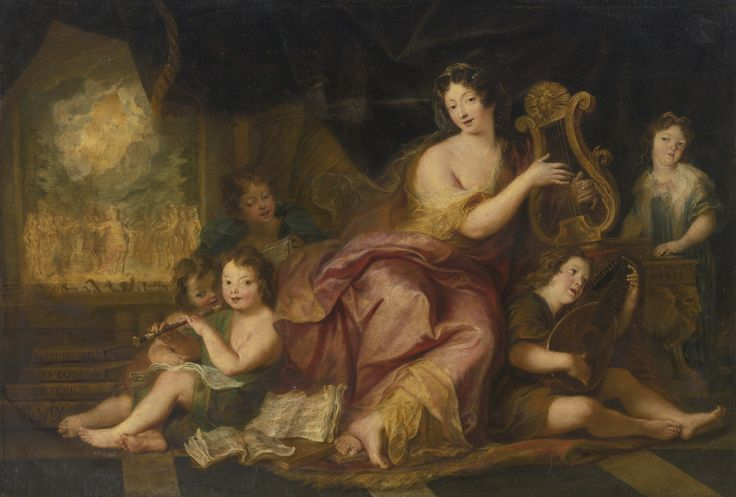
Madame de Maintenon with the natural children of Louis XIV by Antoine Coypel, 1684

Due to her hard work, the king rewarded Scarron with 200,000 livres, which she used to purchase the property at Maintenon in 1674. In 1675, Louis XIV gave her the title of Marquise de Maintenon after the name of her estate. Such favours incurred the jealousy of Madame de Montespan, who began to spar frequently over the children and their care. In 1680, the king made Madame de Maintenon the second mistress of the robes (dame d'atours) to his daughter-in-law, the Dauphine. Soon after the Affair of the Poisons, Montespan left the court and was unofficially replaced by de Maintenon, who proved to be a good influence on Louis XIV. His wife, Queen Marie Thérèse, who for years had been rudely treated by Madame de Montespan, openly declared she had never been so well-treated as at this time.

== Uncrowned queen of France ==
=== Morganatic marriage to Louis XIV ===
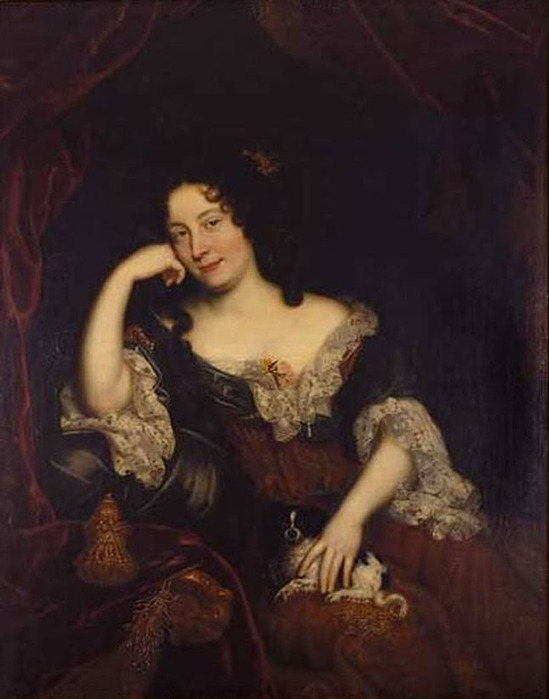
Madame de Maintenon sitting in silk and wearing discreet but rich robes.

"Madame de Maintenon knows how to love. There would be great pleasure in being loved by her," said the king, Louis XIV. He probably asked her to become his mistress at that time. Though she later claimed she did not yield to his advances ("Nothing is so clever as to conduct one's self irreproachably,") the king spent much of his spare time with the royal governess by the late 1670s, discussing politics, economics, and religion. After the death of Marie-Thérèse, Françoise married Louis in a private ceremony by François de Harlay de Champvallon, archbishop of Paris. It is believed that in attendance were Père la Chaise, the king's confessor, the Marquis de Montchevreuil, the Chevalier de Forbin and Alexandre Bontemps, a valet with whom the groom was very close. Owing to the disparity in their social status, the marriage was morganatic, meaning that Madame de Maintenon was not openly acknowledged as the king's wife and did not become queen. No official documentation of the marriage exists, but that it took place is nevertheless accepted by historians. Biographers have dated the wedding to 9 October 1683 or January 1684.

In his memoirs, the duc de Saint-Simon (himself only a boy at the time of the event) wrote the following: "But what is very certain and very true, is, that some time after the return of the King from Fontainebleau, and in the midst of the winter that followed the death of the Queen (posterity will with difficulty believe it, although perfectly true and proved), Père de la Chaise, confessor of the King, said mass at the dead of night in one of the King's cabinets at Versailles. Bontemps, governor of Versailles, chief valet on duty, and the most confidential of the four, was present at this mass, at which the monarch and La Maintenon were married in presence of Harlay, Archbishop of Paris, as diocesan, of Louvois (both of whom drew from the King a promise that he would never declare this marriage), and of Montchevreuil...
The satiety of the honeymoon, usually so fatal, and especially the honeymoon of such marriages, only consolidated the favour of Madame de Maintenon. Soon after, she astonished everybody by the apartments given to her at Versailles, at the top of the grand staircase facing those of the King and on the same floor. From that moment the King always passed some hours with her every day of his life; wherever she might be she was always lodged near him, and on the same floor if possible."

The Marquise of Montespan wrote the following in her memoirs about the marriage between her former friend and ex-lover: "The following week, Madame de Maintenon... consented to the King's will, which she had opposed in order to excite it, and in the presence of the Marquis and Marquise de Montchevreuil, the Duc de Noailles, the Marquis de Chamarante, M. Bontems and Mademoiselle Ninon, her permanent chambermaid, was married to the King of France and Navarre in the chapel of the château. The Abbé de Harlay, Archbishop of Paris, assisted by the Bishop of Chartres and Père de la Chaise, had the honour of blessing this marriage and presenting the rings of gold. After the ceremony, which took place at an early hour, and even by torchlight, there was a slight repast in the small apartments. The same persons, taking carriages, then repaired to Maintenon, where the great ceremony, the mass, and all that is customary in such cases were celebrated. At her return, Madame de Maintenon took possession of an extremely sumptuous apartment that had been carefully arranged and furnished for her. Her people continued to wear her livery, but she scarcely ever rode anymore except in the great carriage of the King, where we saw her in the place, which had been occupied by the Queen. In her interior, the title of Majesty was given her, and the King, when he had to speak of her, only used the word Madame, without adding Maintenon, that having become too familiar and trivial."

=== Political influence ===
Historians have often remarked upon Madame de Maintenon's political influence, which was considerable. She was regarded as the next most powerful person after the king, considered the equivalent of a prime minister after 1700. Without an official position as queen, she was more easily approached by those wishing to have an audience with the king. However, her judgment was not infallible and some mistakes were undoubtedly made; replacing the military commander Nicolas Catinat by the Duke of Villeroi in 1701 may be attributed to her, but certainly not the Spanish Succession.

As a strongly religious person, Madame de Maintenon had a strong influence on her husband, who no longer had open mistresses and banned operas during Lent. Some have accused her of responsibility for the revocation of the Edict of Nantes and for the dragonnades, but recent investigations have shown that she opposed the cruelties of the dragonnades, though she was pleased with the conversions they produced. She told her confessor that in view of her own Protestant upbringing, she feared that a plea for tolerance on behalf of the Huguenots might lead her enemies to claim that she was still a secret Protestant. In 1692, Pope Innocent XII granted her the right of visitation over all the convents in France. Unlike what others believed, Madame de Maintenon mainly used her power for personal patronage- for example, in the frequent economical assistance she gave to her brother Charles d'Aubigné, Comte d'Aubigné. In the latter years of her life, she encouraged her husband to promote her previous charges, the children of the king by Madame de Montespan, to high positions at court intermediate between the prince and princesses du sang and the peers of the realm.

== Educational efforts ==
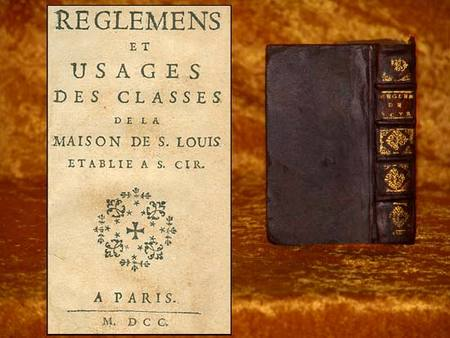
Rules of the Maison Royale de Saint-Louis.

Madame de Maintenon founded the Maison royale de Saint-Louis, a school for girls of impoverished noble families, who were becoming increasingly numerous because many provincial noblemen died in wars or expended their fortunes in the King's service. The school began at Rueil and moved to Noisy-le-Roi until the King endowed Saint-Cyr, a village 5 km west of Versailles, at her request by using the funds of the Abbey of St. Denis. According to her wishes, the education would be different from that traditionally practised in convents, where education was minimal and principally centred on religion: her students were educated to be ladies of the nobility, receiving an education that was severe but showed proof of the era's modernity. Madame de Maintenon was considered a born teacher and a friendly, motherly influence on her pupils, who included Dauphine Marie-Adélaïde of Savoy.

Madame de Maintenon drew up the rules of the institution and attended to every detail. The school buildings housed 250 students, cared for by 36 lay female educators or "professes", 24 "converses" sisters carrying out domestic tasks, and some priests. The students, aged 7 to 20, were divided by their uniform colour: red for 7 to 10 years old; green for 11 to 14; yellow for 15–16; blue for 17–20, and black for the most talented and disciplined from the "blues". Each class had a timetable appropriate to its students' age: the "reds" learned arithmetic, geometry, reading and writing, along with receiving the rudiments of Catechism, Latin, and religious history; the "greens" continued in these subjects, along with geography and history; the "yellows" also learned drawing and dancing; the "blues" were initiated into heraldry, the history of the Catholic Church and more detailed teaching in morality; and the blacks were in charge of helping the teachers in classes, accounts, hospital, refectory, and sewing clothes for their fellow students or the teachers. Leisure time was also important for Maintenon, who encouraged the students to play intellectual games such as chess and checkers, though card games were banned. She asked Jean Racine to write Esther and Athalie for the girls at Saint-Cyr.

=== Influence in education ===
Maison royale de Saint-Louis is considered to have greatly influenced the demands of the Society of Revolutionary Republican Women, the first women's political interest group founded in 1793. Their successful attempt to link gender equality through the educational system's reformation and the enforcement of the 1724 royal ordinance that imposed compulsory universal primary education, was inspired by the 17th-century treatises by Madame de Maintenon and François Fénelon. In the Revolutionary context, Madame de Maintenon's ideas were used by local officials and philanthropists who successfully established neighbourhood primary schools that accepted many young poor girls. Her work had a lasting impact on the original feminist movement, which gathered in Parisian salons and during the Age of Enlightenment, one aim of which was to promote educational equality between sexes to both improve society with more capable workers and to help lower-class women escape their condition and prostitution.

== Later life ==
After her husband's death in 1715, Françoise retired to the Maison royale de Saint-Louis at Saint-Cyr-l'École with a pension of 48,000 livres by the Duc d'Orléans and regent of France. She continued to receive visitors at Saint-Cyr, including Tsar Peter the Great of Russia. He was seated at a chair by the foot of her bed and asked what her illness was, to which she replied, "Old age". She asked what brought him to her room, to which he replied, "I came to see everything worthy of note that France contains." He later remarked to his aides that she had rendered a great service to the King and nation.

Françoise died on 15 April 1719, at the age of 83. Her will expressed her wishes to be buried in the choir at Saint-Cyr and bequeath her Château de Maintenon to her niece, Françoise Charlotte d'Aubigné, Duchess of Noailles and her brother Charles' only daughter. In her honour, a small island, off the coast of Cape Breton, Nova Scotia, Canada, which at that time was known as "L'Île Royale", was attributed to her; this island was named Isle Madame (first noted as l'Isle de la Marquise).

== In popular culture ==
- In Herman Melville's early novel Mardi (1849), the character Annatoo, having ditched her husband Samoa and taken over the forecastle of an abandoned ship, is likened to "Madame de Maintenon dedicating her last days and night to continence and calicoes" (Vol 1, ch XXV)
- Madame de Maintenon is briefly mentioned in Alexandre Dumas' book Twenty Years After. She converses with Raoul, the fictional Vicomte de Bragelonne, at Abbe Scarron's party.
- Madame de Maintenon is featured by Arthur Conan Doyle in his novel The Refugees, which includes the story of her midnight marriage ceremony.
- F. Scott Fitzgerald references Madame de Maintenon in The Great Gatsby in describing "Ella Kaye, the newspaper woman," who apparently murders Gatsby's father figure Dan Cody.
- Spanish writer José Jiménez Lozano depicts Madame de Maintenon as an icon of false religious piety in his first novel, Historia de un otoño (1971).
- Madame de Maintenon was portrayed by Catherine Walker in the TV series Versailles.
- Irène Silvagni depicted Madame de Maintenon in the French film The Death of Louis XIV (2016).
- Madame de Maintenon is featured in the novel The King's Way, where she explains her life to one of her students at Saint-Cyr.
- A cropped version of a portrait of Madame de Maintenon (File:Mme de Maintenon.jpg) has been noted to resemble the logo of the reverse engineering software IDA Pro. The logo itself has not been officially identified as depicting Maintenon.
- Madame Scarron is also mentioned in Angélique, a series of thirteen historical adventure romance novels written by French author Anne Golon.
