= Canton of Châtelus-Malvaleix =

Coordinates: 46°19′01″N 2°06′27″E

Châtelus-Malvaleix
- Former canton
- Interactive map of Châtelus-Malvaleix
- Country: France
- Region: Nouvelle-Aquitaine
- Department: Creuse
- No. of communes: {{{nbcomm}}}
- Disbanded: 2015
- Area: 220.73 km^{2} (85.22 sq mi)
- Population (2012): 3,708
  - Density: 16.80/km^{2} (43.51/sq mi)

The Canton of Châtelus-Malvaleix is a former canton situated in the Creuse département and in the Limousin region of central France. It was disbanded following the French canton reorganisation which came into effect in March 2015. It had 3,708 inhabitants (2012).

== Geography ==
An area of farming and forestry in the arrondissement of Guéret, centred on the town of Châtelus-Malvaleix. The altitude varies from 266m (Genouillac) to 566m (Roches) with an average altitude of 373m.

The canton comprised 10 communes:

- Bétête
- La Cellette
- Châtelus-Malvaleix
- Clugnat
- Genouillac
- Jalesches
- Nouziers
- Roches
- Saint-Dizier-les-Domaines
- Tercillat

== Population ==
Historical population Canton of Châtelus-Malvaleix
Year	1962	1968	1975	1982	1990	1999
Pop.	5,265	5,728	5,065	4,580	4,169	3,844
±%	—	+8.8%	−11.6%	−9.6%	−9.0%	−7.8%
From the year 1962 on: No double counting – residents of multiple communes (e.g. students and military personnel) are counted only once. Source: INSEE

== See also ==
- Arrondissements of the Creuse department
- Cantons of the Creuse department
- Communes of the Creuse department
