= Communauté de communes Marche Avenir =

Coordinates: 46.3973°N 1.9175°E

Marche Avenir
- Former communauté de communes
- Interactive map of Marche Avenir
- Country: France
- Region: Nouvelle-Aquitaine
- Department: Creuse
- No. of communes: {{{nbcomm}}}
- Established: 1993
- Disbanded: 2014
- Population (1999): 1,730

The communauté de communes Marche Avenir is a former intercommunality in the Creuse département of the Limousin region of central France. It was created in January 1993. It was merged into the new Communauté de communes Portes de la Creuse en Marche in January 2014.

It comprised the following 6 communes:

- La Cellette
- La Forêt-du-Temple
- Linard
- Mortroux
- Moutier-Malcard
- Nouziers

== See also ==
- Communes of the Creuse department
