= André Chandernagor =

French politician (1921–2025)

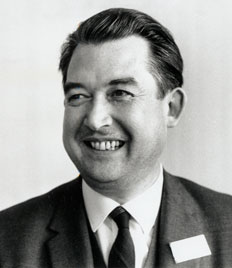

First President of the Court of Auditors
- In office 7 December 1983 – 19 September 1990
- Preceded by: Jean Rosenwald
- Succeeded by: Pierre Arpaillange

Minister delegate for Ministry for Europe and Foreign Affairs
- In office 22 May 1981 – 7 December 1983
- Preceded by: Pierre Bernard-Reymond
- Succeeded by: Catherine Lalumière

President of the General Council of Creuse
- In office 30 September 1973 – 7 December 1983
- Preceded by: Paul Pauly
- Succeeded by: Michel Moreigne
- Constituency: Canton of Bourganeuf

Mayor of Mortroux
- In office 3 May 1953 – 7 December 1983
- Succeeded by: Thierry Chandernagor

President of the Regional Council of Limousin
- In office 5 January 1974 – 21 September 1981
- Succeeded by: Louis Longequeue

Deputy of the National Assembly
- In office 9 December 1958 – 23 July 1981
- Succeeded by: Nelly Commergnat
- Constituency: Creuse's 2nd constituency

Personal details
- Born: 19 September 1921 Civray, France
- Died: 18 November 2025 (aged 104) Aubusson, France
- Party: Socialist Party (1971–1981)
- Other political affiliations: SFIO (1958–1967); FGDS (1967–1970)
- Spouse: Eliane Bernardet (m. 1944; died 2004)
- Children: 3, including Françoise

André Chandernagor (19 September 1921 – 18 November 2025) was a French politician who served as a deputy for Creuse from 1958 to 1981 and as Minister delegate for European Affairs from 1981 to 1983. He subsequently became the 31st First President of the Court of Audit, serving from 1983 to 1990.

== Early life ==
André Chandernagor was born in Civray on 19 September 1921, into a family from Poitou. His surname, Chandernagor, comes from an ancestor of Indian origin, Charles François Chandernagor, known as "Bengale," who was born between 1743 and 1748 in Réunion and died in 1821 in Civray. He studied at the Lycée Henri-IV and then at the École nationale de la France d'Outre-mer, after a stay in Indochina.

== Career ==
In 1945, he became Deputy Administrator of the Overseas France, and from 1949 to 1951, he attended the École nationale d'administration (ENA) in the same cohort as Valéry Giscard d'Estaing. Also holding a degree in law, he became a maître des requêtes at the Conseil d'État in 1957, specializing in public law. He joined the SFIO in 1944 and had his first political experience in 1946 as an attaché in the office of Marius Moutet, the Minister of Overseas France.

=== Political career ===
André Chandernagor entered active politics in 1953 when he was elected mayor of Mortroux. In 1955, he experienced a temporary setback in local politics when he was defeated by the incumbent Radical general councillor in the cantonal elections in Bonnat. He eventually joined the General Council of Creuse in 1961, succeeding former senator Gaston Chazette in the canton of Bourganeuf.

During his tenure in Creuse, Chandernagor was a proponent of the development of what became the route Centre-Europe Atlantique, alongside the mayor of Mâcon, Louis Escande. In 1973, following the death of Paul Pauly, he was elected president of the General Council of Creuse.

In 1974, he became president of the Regional Council of Limousin. He served as the representative of Creuse in the National Assembly from 30 November 1958, to 23 July 1981. From 1967 to 1968, he was vice-president of the National Assembly. To date, he holds the record for the longest representation of Creuse in the National Assembly, with 23 years of service. He served as president of the Inter-Parliamentary Union from 1968 to 1973 and authored the book 'Un Parlement pour quoi faire?'.

A close associate of Guy Mollet (having been a member of his cabinet in 1956–1957) and a staunch anti-communist, Chandernagor long opposed the Union of the Left, favoring an alliance with centrist parties. He was a member of the SFIO's executive committee and later the PS. In 1970, he was temporarily suspended from the PS, and it was speculated that he intended to form a new dissident social-democratic party. After the Épinay Congress in 1971, he aligned himself with Pierre Mauroy. His political influence and experience led to his inclusion in the government in 1981 following François Mitterrand's election as President of the Republic.

In December 1983, Chandernagor was appointed First President of the Court of Auditors. He became the first honorary president in September 1990 and, on 24 May 2005, joined the Honorary Committee for the bicentenary of the Court of Auditors, chaired by then First President Philippe Séguin.

In 2017, at the age of 96, he chaired the support committee for Jean-Baptiste Moreau, the La République En Marche candidate for the legislative elections in Creuse.

== Personal life and death ==
Chandernagor married Eliane Bernardet in 1944. The couple stayed together until her death in 2004. Together they had three children, writer Françoise Chandernagor, Dominique Chandernagor, and Thierry Chandernagor, former president of the General Council of Creuse. He died on 18 November 2025, at the age of 104.

== Works ==
- Un Parlement, pour quoi faire ?, Gallimard, 1967
- Réformer la démocratie, Balland, 1977 with Alexandre Sanguinetti
- Les maires en France, XIX^{e}-XX^{e} siècle. Histoire et sociologie d'une fonction, Fayard, 1993
- La Liberté en héritage, Pygmalion, 2004

== Awards ==
- Grand Cross of the Legion of Honor in 2021 (Grand Officer in 2012).
