= Communauté de communes de la Petite Creuse =

Coordinates: 46.35067°N 1.9919°E

la Petite Creuse
- Former communauté de communes
- Interactive map of la Petite Creuse
- Country: France
- Region: Nouvelle-Aquitaine
- Department: Creuse
- No. of communes: {{{nbcomm}}}
- Established: 2003
- Disbanded: 2013
- Area: 215.6 km^{2} (83.2 sq mi)
- Population (1999): 3,732
  - Density: 17.31/km^{2} (44.83/sq mi)

The communauté de communes de la Petite Creuse was located in the Creuse département of the Limousin region of central France. It was created in January 2003. It was dissolved in 2013.

== Participants ==
The communauté comprised the following 9 communes:

- Bétête
- Châtelus-Malvaleix
- Clugnat
- Genouillac
- Jalesches
- Ladapeyre
- Roches
- Saint-Dizier-les-Domaines
- Tercillat

== Policies and objectives ==
The Community of communes aims to involve and unite the local communes with a view to establishing joint development projects and the development of space. It aims to exercise its powers in the interest of the community in: Spatial planning, economic development, tourism, housing and the protection and enhancement of the environment as well as local roads, sport and culture.

== See also ==
- Communes of the Creuse department
