= Communauté de communes des Deux Vallées (Creuse) =

Coordinates: 46.3258°N 1.9069°E

Deux Vallées
- Former communauté de communes
- Interactive map of Deux Vallées
- Country: France
- Region: Nouvelle-Aquitaine
- Department: Creuse
- No. of communes: {{{nbcomm}}}
- Established: 1999
- Disbanded: 2014
- Population (1999): 3,069

The communauté de communes des Deux Vallées was located in the Creuse département of the Limousin region of central France. It was created in January 1999. It was merged into the new Communauté de communes Portes de la Creuse en Marche in January 2014.

It comprised the following 5 communes:

- Bonnat
- Chambon-Sainte-Croix
- Chéniers
- Lourdoueix-Saint-Pierre
- Malval

== See also ==
- Communes of the Creuse department
