= Patinoire Michel-Raffoux =

Ice rink located in Dunkirk, France

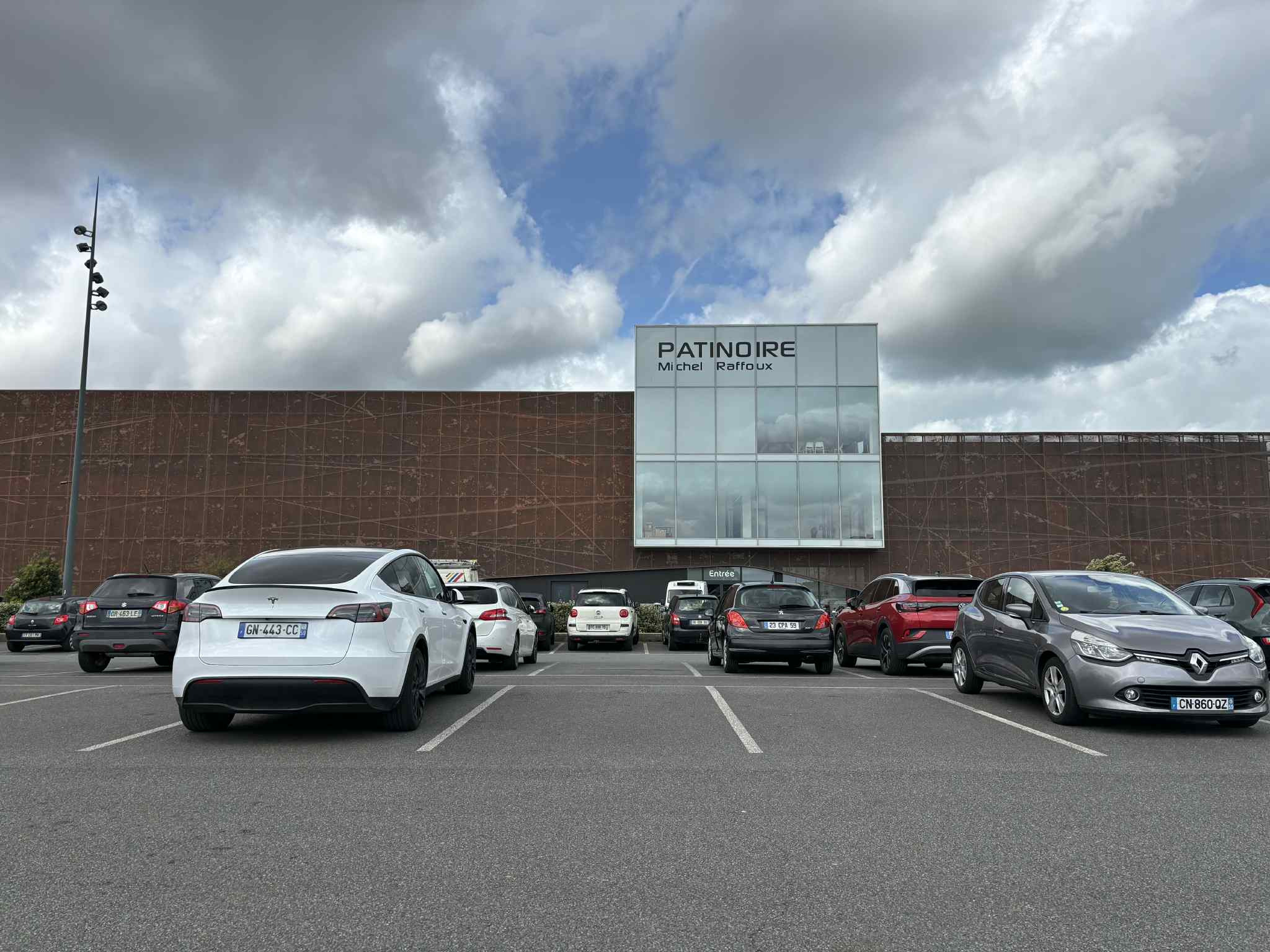
- Main entrance, west side
- Interactive map of Patinoire Michel-Raffoux
- Address: Route du Quai Freycinet 3 Môle 1
- Location: Dunkirk, Pas-de-Calais, France
- Coordinates: 51°2′13.3″N 2°21′55.1″E
- Owner: Communauté urbaine de Dunkerque
- Operator: Vert Marine
- Capacity: 1400 (seated); 1700 (total)
- Executive suites: 6
- Surface: 7890 m^{2}
- Field size: 60 × 30 metre (rink 1); 42 × 20 metre (rink 2)
- Public transit: Môle 1

Construction
- Groundbreaking: 27 January 2018
- Opened: 1 August 2019 (opening); 6 September 2019 (inauguration ceremony)
- Cost: €21 million
- Architect: Chabanne et Partenaires
- General contractor: Ramery

Tenants
- Corsaires de Dunkerque (2019–present)

Patinoire Michel-Raffoux (English: Michel Raffoux Ice Rink) is an ice rink located in the harbor of Dunkirk, Pas-de-Calais, France. It is the second venue to bear that name after another located in the beach district of Malo-les-Bains, which it replaced. Like its predecessor, it serves as the home venue for ice hockey team Corsaires de Dunkerque.

== History ==
The new building replaces its older namesake, a 56 × 26-metre facility inaugurated on 7 November 1970 and demolished in late 2019. Beyond the name, there is no connection between the two, as the old Patinoire Michel-Raffoux sat near the city's casino and congress center, two kilometers to the northeast of the new one. Both were named in honor of Michel Raffoux (1934–1990), a former president of the Corsaires and the French Ice Sports Federation's Northern Minor Hockey League.

Negotiations to replace the aging rink had been ongoing for years when, during a 1 November 2014 game against Reims, an errand puck flew into the unprotected stands and hit 8-year-old fan Hugo Vermeersh in the temple, mortally injuring him. The child's death and resulting national media attention lent added gravitas to calls for an up-to-date venue, which received funding from the Communauté urbaine de Dunkerque in late 2015.

The current version was inaugurated in the summer of 2019. It is located on a disused mole in Dunkirk harbor, half a mile west of Dunkirk city centre.

== Design ==
The new Patinoire Michel-Raffoux represented the second phase of the mole's rehabilitation project, following architect fr:Pierre-Olivier Faloci's remodel of the Halle aux Sucres, a late 19th-century warehouse built by fr:Paul Friesé, into an information commons. Patinoire Michel-Raffoux stands next to it, and its proportions are meant to echo those of Faloci's work. As a further nod to the area's industrial background, three of the rink's sides have been covered with aluminum panels that simulate a rusted look. The remaining short side is a 45 × 10-metre wall of glass. Its northerly orientation allows a view on the Halle aux Sucres' central aisle while protecting the recreational rink, which it borders, from excess sun glare.

The building consists of an Olympic-sized track and a smaller recreational track. The main hall is equipped with six VIP boxes, and a restaurant with a row of club-level seats above the home goal. It was designed by Chabanne et Partenaires, who also created ice arenas for the agglomerations of Angers, Cergy-Pontoise and Marseille.

== Notable events ==
- 2019 French Ice Sports Championships
