= Aren'Ice =

Multi-purpose arena in Cergy, France

- Interactive map of Aren'Ice
- Address: 33 avenue de la Plaine des Sports
- Location: Cergy, France
- Coordinates: 49°03′06″N 2°03′23″E
- Operator: UCPA
- Capacity: 3,000 (ice hockey)
- Surface: 13,261 m^{2}
- Field size: 60 × 30 metre

Construction
- Groundbreaking: 8 June 2015
- Opened: 4 November 2016
- Cost: € 44 million
- Architect: Chabanne et Partenaires
- Main contractor: Rabot Dutilleul Construction

Tenants
- Jokers de Cergy-Pontoise (Ligue Magnus); France men's national ice hockey team France women's national ice hockey team

Aren'Ice, also known under the working name Centre national du Hockey sur Glace (English: National Ice Hockey Center), is a multi-purpose arena primarily used as an ice rink, located in Cergy, Val-d'Oise, France. It is both the French Ice Hockey Federation's national training center, and the home ice for professional ice hockey team Jokers de Cergy-Pontoise.

== History ==
Following the separation of French ice hockey from the French Ice Sports Federation in 2006, Luc Tardif, president of the new ice hockey federation, announced his plans for a federal training center based in the Paris Region.

Various sites came under consideration throughout the selection process: Cergy-Pontoise, La Courneuve (Parc de Marville), Deuil-la-Barre, Drancy, Évry, Pays de Limours (Fontenay-lès-Briis), Marne-la-Vallée, Meudon, Saint-Quentin-en-Yvelines and Torcy.

Of these, Cergy-Pontoise, Deuil-la-Barre, Meudon and Évry already had an ice rink and ice hockey club. Marne-la-Vallée only had an outdoor recreational ice rink (which has since been closed) as part of Disneyland Paris, and no hockey club. One of the resort's top executives in the 1990s was former hockey player Pierre-Yves Gerbeau, but a longstanding grudge with the French hockey brass of the time had made him unreceptive to promotional partnerships.

At the tender submission deadline, the final candidates were: Cergy-Pontoise, La Courneuve, Drancy, Évry and Pays de Limours, with Cergy-Pontoise emerging as the victor.

The building opened to the public on 4 November 2016, with an official inauguration ceremony on 19 November 2016 in presence of Minister of Sports Patrick Kanner. Coincidentally, Cergy's old municipal ice rink, which dated back to 1974, was decommissioned.

Through its various activities and entertainment offerings, Aren'Ice generated more than 200,000 admissions in its first year of operations.

== Building ==
Aren'Ice was primarily designed by Chabanne et Partenaires, an architectural firm responsible for several other ice rinks including those in Marseille, Angers and Dunkirk, as well the French Cycling Federation's National Cycling Center in Saint-Quentin-en-Yvelines. Construction cost €44,000,000 with the terrain provided by the community of Cergy-Pontoise.

The main hall, named Eclipse, features an olympic-size ice pad surrounded by stands seating 3,000 in ice hockey configuration. Seats are heated by vents that maintain a 19°C temperature. The second hall, named Equinox, is a training and recreational venue featuring a second olympic-size pad and a small stand seating 320.

The building also hosts in excess of 300 m^{2} of office space. This includes the headquarters of the French Ice Hockey Federation, which moved there from Issy-les-Moulineaux upon completion of the facility.

Although it was billed as "the largest ice rink" in France at its opening, this seems to be in reference to the fact that it consists of two Olympic size pads, whereas dual pad facilities built in France up to that point used a 56 × 26 metre or smaller second pad. The Palais omnisports Marseille Grand-Est is the largest ice rink in terms of spectator capacity at 5,600 in hockey configuration, which excludes ice capable entertainment venues such as Paris' Accor Arena, home of the French Cup final.

== Aren'Park ==
Aren'Park is a 22,000 m^{2} commercial district adjacent to Aren'Ice, which opened in September 2018. In addition to a Leclerc hypermarket, it features various stores operated by chains such as Intersport, GiFi and La Vie Claire. An 84-room hotel, B&B Aren'Park Cergy, opened there in early 2019.

== Student-athlete housing ==
In 2019, the community of Cergy-Pontoise and the French Ice Hockey Federation announced the building of a student athlete residence specifically geared towards French hockey prospects. Named Résidence Palet and located east of Aren'Ice, it consists of 28 units for 38 young athletes, 5 adults and 2 security staff members. Most residents will study at Lycée Jules Verne.
