= Nelly Commergnat =

French politician (1943–2021)

Member of the French National Assembly
- In office 2 July 1981 – 1 April 1986
- Constituency: Creuse's 2nd constituency

Member of the Regional Council of Limousin
- In office 1981–1986

General Councilor of the Canton of Bonnat
- In office 1979–1985
- Preceded by: Jean Pinton
- Succeeded by: René Le Caignec

Personal details
- Born: 28 November 1943 Châteauneuf-Val-de-Bargis, France
- Died: 15 December 2021 (aged 78) Bonnat, France
- Party: PS

Nelly Commergnat (28 November 1943 – 15 December 2021) was a French politician. A member of the Socialist Party, she served in the National Assembly from 1981 to 1986.
