= Communauté de communes Portes de la Creuse en Marche =

Federation of municipalities in France

Portes de la Creuse en Marche
- Communauté de communes
- Interactive map of Portes de la Creuse en Marche
- Coordinates: 46°21′N 02°00′E
- Country: France
- Region: Nouvelle-Aquitaine
- Department: Creuse
- No. of communes: {{{nbcomm}}}
- Established: 2014
- Area: 345.3 km^{2} (133.3 sq mi)
- Population (2021): 6,591
  - Density: 19.09/km^{2} (49.44/sq mi)

The Communauté de communes Portes de la Creuse en Marche is a communauté de communes, an intercommunal structure, in the Creuse department, in the Nouvelle-Aquitaine region, central France. It was created in January 2014 by the merger of the former communautés de communes Marche Avenir and Deux Vallées and part of Petite Creuse. Its area is 345.3 km^{2}, and its population was 6,591 in 2021. Its seat is in Genouillac.

== Communes ==
The communauté de communes consists of the following 16 communes:

1. Bonnat
2. La Cellette
3. Champsanglard
4. Châtelus-Malvaleix
5. La Forêt-du-Temple
6. Genouillac
7. Jalesches
8. Linard-Malval
9. Lourdoueix-Saint-Pierre
10. Méasnes
11. Mortroux
12. Moutier-Malcard
13. Nouziers
14. Roches
15. Saint-Dizier-les-Domaines
16. Tercillat
