= Léon Chagnaud =

- Born: Léon, Jean, Félicien Chagnaud; 12 March 1866; Le Bourg-d'Hem, Creuse, France
- Died: 31 July 1930 (aged 64); Champsanglard, Creuse, France
- Resting place: Bonnat, Creuse, France
- Education: Ecole Nationale Supérieur d'Arts et Métiers
- Occupations: Businessman, politician
- Spouse: Pauline Jouanny
- Children: Charles Chagnaud; Jeanne Lenormand
- Parent(s): Hippolyte Chagnaud; Jeanne Chagnaud
- Relatives: Philippe Fougerolle (brother-in-law)

Léon Chagnaud (1866-1930) was a French businessman and politician.

== Early life ==
Léon Chagnaud was born on 12 March 1866 in Le Bourg-d'Hem, rural France. His father, Hippolyte Chagnaud, was a mason based in Guéret who owned quarries of granite which were used to pave some of the streets of Paris. His mother was Jeanne Chagnaud. His sister, Antoinette Chagnaud, married Philippe Fougerolle, a mason who founded Fougerolle, a construction company acquired by Eiffage in 1992.

He graduated from the Arts et Métiers ParisTech engineering school in Châlons-sur-Marne. His father died in 1891, when Chagnaud was 25. He then did his military service.

== Career ==
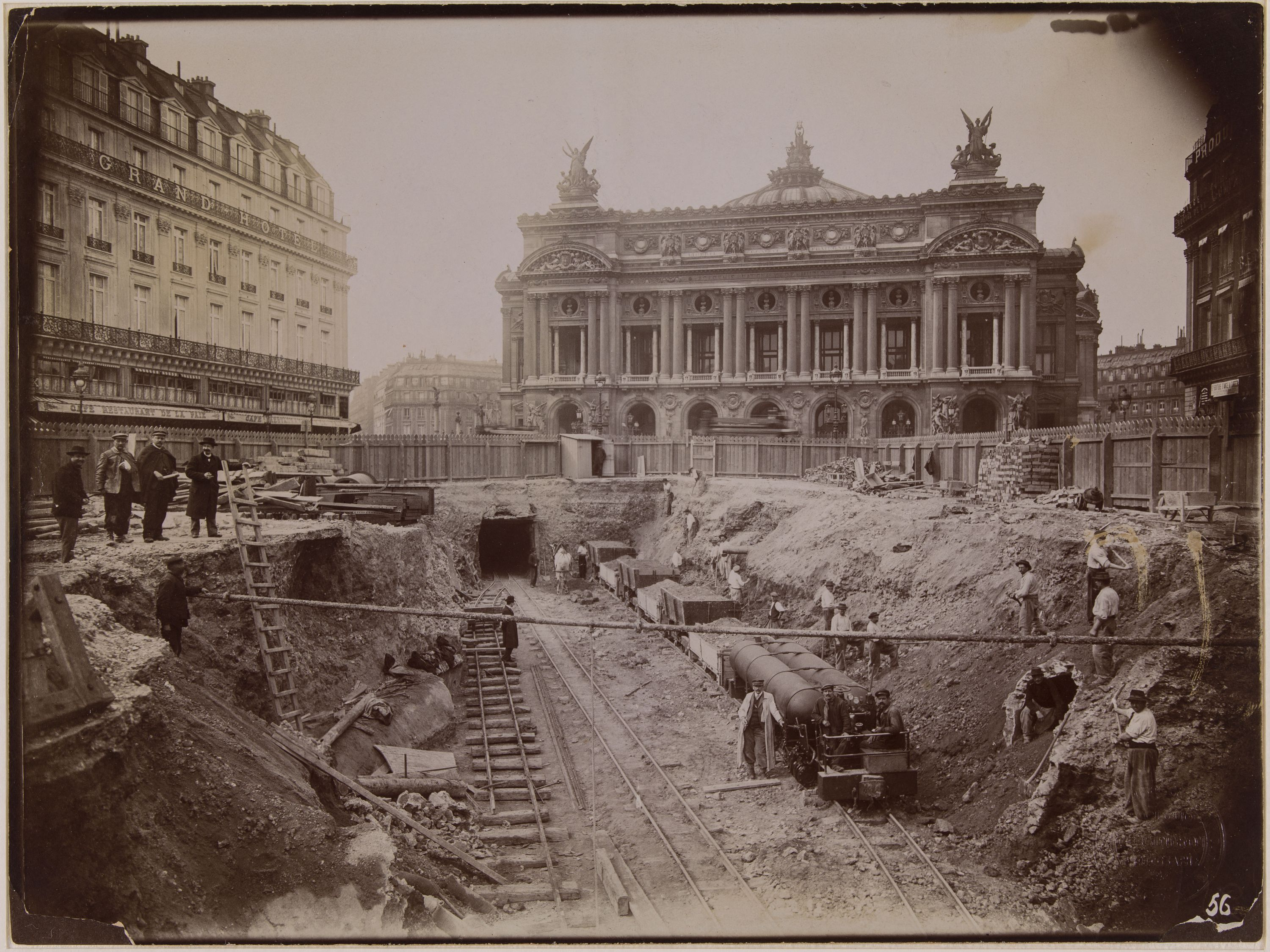
Construction of the Opéra métro station in Paris

With his inheritance, Chagnaud founded Entreprise Chagnaud, a construction company. In Paris, he built the Viaduct of Passy across the Seine as well as the Paris Métro Line 4 under the Seine, the railroad tracks from the Gare d'Austerlitz to the Gare d'Orsay, and the Opéra métro station. In provincial France, he built locks of the Canal du Centre, the Rove Tunnel, the aqueduct of Achères, the Éguzon Dam. He also built the Ghrib Dam in Oued Chorfa, and the Bou Hanifia Dam in Bou Hanifia, French Algeria. Additionally, he built the Lötschberg Tunnel in Switzerland.

Chagnaud purchased L'Écho de La Creuse, a regional newspaper. He was also a large landowner in Creuse, Indre, and French Algeria. He served on the board of directors of the Société des Mines de bitume et d'Asphalte du Centre (SMAC), which owned an asphalt mine in Pont-du-Château and pioneered the use of asphalt to build roads in France. Additionally, he served on the Boards of Directors of two Moroccan companies: Omnium de Transports au Maroc and Ports Marocains.

He served as a member of the French Senate from 1921 to 1930, representing Creuse. He was a staunch supporter of Prime Minister Raymond Poincaré. He ran for re-election in 1930, but lost his seat to François Binet.

He became an Officer of the Legion of Honour.

== Personal life ==
He married Pauline Jouanny on 14 July 1875 in Bonnat. They had a son, Charles Chagnaud, and a daughter, Mrs Jeanne Lenormand. They resided at 83, Avenue Henri-Martin, in the 16th arrondissement of Paris. They also owned two châteaux in La Creuse: the Château de Lasvy in Champsanglard, and the Château de Beauvais in Saint-Amand-Jartoudeix, and another château in Indre: Château de Bélâbre.

== Death and legacy ==
He died at his Château de Lasvy in Champsanglard on 31 July 1930. He was buried in Bonnat. His son served in World War I and inherited the family business. His company is now known as Chagnaud construction.
