= Linard-Malval =

Commune in Nouvelle-Aquitaine, France

- Commune
- Location of Linard-Malval
- Location within France Location within Nouvelle-Aquitaine
- Coordinates: 46°21′32″N 1°52′26″E
- Country: France
- Region: Nouvelle-Aquitaine
- Department: Creuse
- Arrondissement: Guéret
- Canton: Bonnat
- Intercommunality: CC Portes de la Creuse en Marche

Government
  - Mayor (2020–2026): Michel Poirier
- Area^{1}: 16.63 km^{2} (6.42 sq mi)
- Elevation: 360 m (1,180 ft)
- Highest elevation: 378 m (1,240 ft)
- Lowest elevation: 242 m (794 ft)
- Population (2023): 206
  - Density: 12.4/km^{2} (32.1/sq mi)
- Time zone: UTC+01:00 (CET)
  - Summer (DST): UTC+02:00 (CEST)
- INSEE/Postal code: 23109 /23220
- ^{1} French Land Register data, which excludes lakes, ponds, glaciers > 1 km^{2} (0.386 sq mi or 247 acres) and river estuaries.

Linard-Malval (French pronunciation: [linaʁ malval]; Limousin: Linar e Malaval) is a commune in the Creuse department in the Nouvelle-Aquitaine region in central France. It was established on 1 January 2019 by merger of the former communes of Linard (the seat) and Malval.

== See also ==
- Communes of the Creuse department
