= Linard =

Commune in Creuse, France

- Part of Linard-Malval
- Coat of arms
- Location of Linard
- Location within France Location within Nouvelle-Aquitaine
- Coordinates: 46°21′32″N 1°52′26″E
- Country: France
- Region: Nouvelle-Aquitaine
- Department: Creuse
- Arrondissement: Guéret
- Canton: Bonnat
- Commune: Linard-Malval
- Area^{1}: 12.6 km^{2} (4.9 sq mi)
- Elevation: 360 m (1,180 ft)
- Highest elevation: 378 m (1,240 ft)
- Lowest elevation: 242 m (794 ft)
- Population (2019): 164
  - Density: 13.0/km^{2} (33.7/sq mi)
- Time zone: UTC+01:00 (CET)
  - Summer (DST): UTC+02:00 (CEST)
- Postal code: 23220
- ^{1} French Land Register data, which excludes lakes, ponds, glaciers > 1 km^{2} (0.386 sq mi or 247 acres) and river estuaries.

Linard (French pronunciation: [linaʁ]) is a former commune in the Creuse department in the Nouvelle-Aquitaine region in central France. On 1 January 2019, it was merged into the new commune Linard-Malval.

== Geography ==
A farming area comprising the village and a few small hamlets situated some 12 miles (19 km) north of Guéret near the D6 and its junction with the D56 road. The Petite Creuse river forms the southern boundary of the commune's territory.

== Sights ==
- The church of St. Martin, dating from the fourteenth century.
- Traces of the Château-Gaillard.
- The fifteenth-century chapel of the convent de Boisferry.

== See also ==
- Communes of the Creuse department
