= Méasnes =

Commune in Nouvelle-Aquitaine, France

- Commune
- Location of Méasnes
- Location within France Location within Nouvelle-Aquitaine
- Coordinates: 46°25′02″N 1°46′43″E
- Country: France
- Region: Nouvelle-Aquitaine
- Department: Creuse
- Arrondissement: Guéret
- Canton: Bonnat
- Intercommunality: CC Portes de la Creuse en Marche

Government
  - Mayor (2020–2026): Marc Lamontagne
- Area^{1}: 27.63 km^{2} (10.67 sq mi)
- Elevation: 362 m (1,188 ft)
- Highest elevation: 426 m (1,398 ft)
- Lowest elevation: 280 m (920 ft)
- Population (2023): 522
  - Density: 18.9/km^{2} (48.9/sq mi)
- Time zone: UTC+01:00 (CET)
  - Summer (DST): UTC+02:00 (CEST)
- INSEE/Postal code: 23130 /23360
- ^{1} French Land Register data, which excludes lakes, ponds, glaciers > 1 km^{2} (0.386 sq mi or 247 acres) and river estuaries.

Méasnes (French pronunciation: [me.an]; Occitan: Mesnes) is a commune in the Creuse department in the Nouvelle-Aquitaine region in central France.

== Geography ==
A farming area comprising the village and several hamlets situated some 17 miles (27 km) north of Guéret at the junction of the D2, D4 and the D22 roads, on the border with the department of Indre. A small tributary of the Petite Creuse, the river Lavaud flows through the middle of the village.

== Population ==
Historical population
Year	Pop.	±% p.a.
1968	834	—
1975	719	−2.10%
1982	705	−0.28%
1990	668	−0.67%
1999	615	−0.91%
2007	596	−0.39%
2012	572	−0.82%
2017	544	−1.00%
2023	522	−0.69%
Source: INSEE

== Sights ==
- The church of St. Gervaix, dating from the fourteenth century.
- Traces of the medieval Cistercian abbey of Aubepierre, destroyed in the sixteenth century.
- Ruins of the castle of Lavaud.
- The château at Plaix-Goliard.

== See also ==
- Communes of the Creuse department
