= Malval =

Commune in Creuse, France

- Part of Linard-Malval
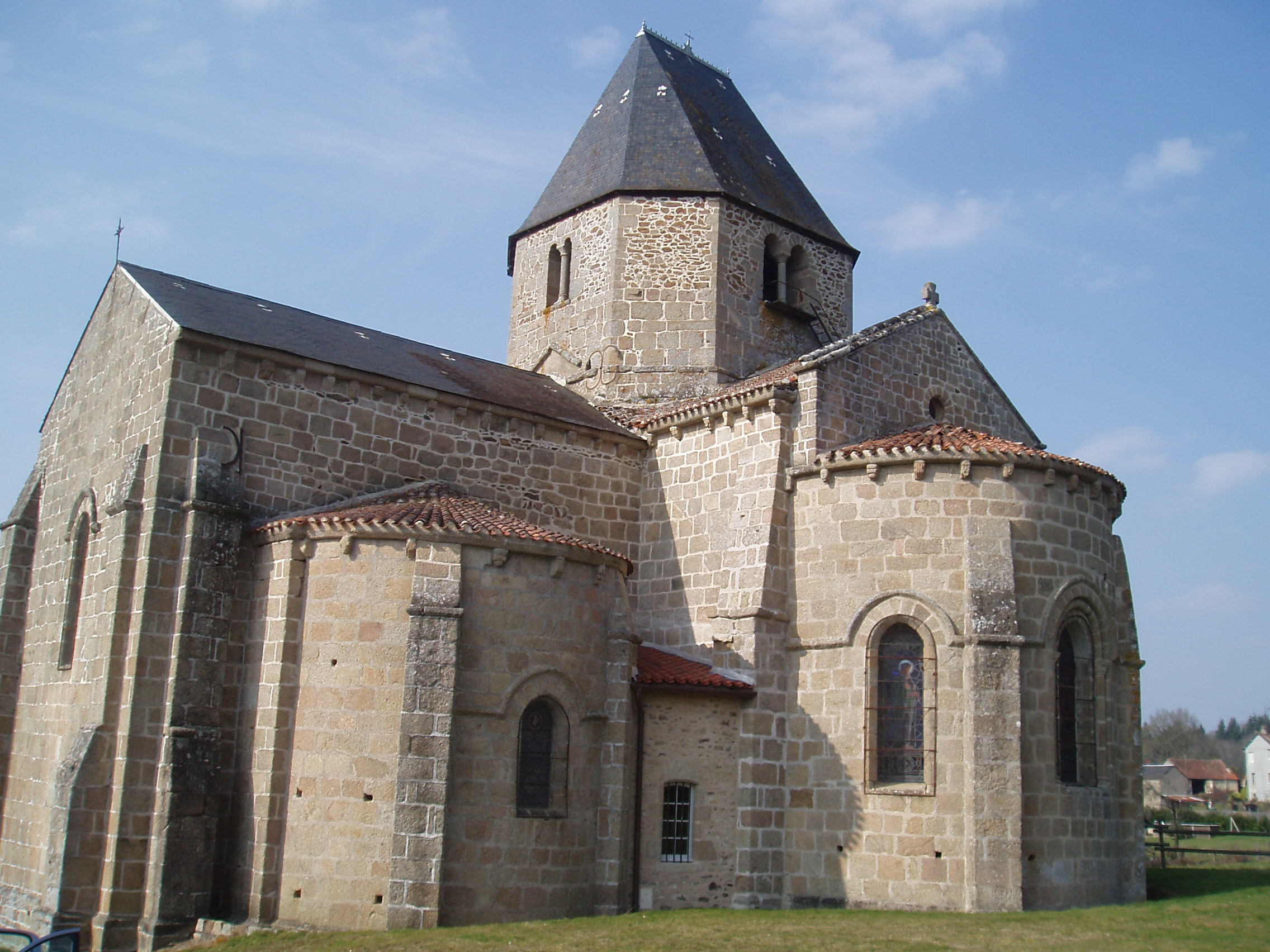
- The church in Malval

- Coat of arms
- Location of Malval
- Location within France Location within Nouvelle-Aquitaine
- Coordinates: 46°21′02″N 1°53′10″E
- Country: France
- Region: Nouvelle-Aquitaine
- Department: Creuse
- Arrondissement: Guéret
- Canton: Bonnat
- Commune: Linard-Malval
- Area^{1}: 4.03 km^{2} (1.56 sq mi)
- Elevation: 200 m (660 ft)
- Highest elevation: 376 m (1,234 ft)
- Lowest elevation: 248 m (814 ft)
- Population (2019): 47
  - Density: 12/km^{2} (30/sq mi)
- Time zone: UTC+01:00 (CET)
  - Summer (DST): UTC+02:00 (CEST)
- Postal code: 23220
- ^{1} French Land Register data, which excludes lakes, ponds, glaciers > 1 km^{2} (0.386 sq mi or 247 acres) and river estuaries.

Malval (French pronunciation: [malval]; Limousin: Malaval) is a former commune in the Creuse department in the Nouvelle-Aquitaine region in central France. On 1 January 2019, it was merged into the new commune Linard-Malval.

== Geography ==
A very small farming village, situated by the banks of the Petite Creuse river, some 12 miles (19 km) north of Guéret at the junction of the D56 and the D6 roads.

== Sights ==
- The church of St. Valérie, dating from the twelfth century.
- The ruins of a fourteenth-century castle.
- A restored watermill.

== See also ==
- Communes of the Creuse department
