= Departmental Council of Creuse =

Departmental legislature in France

Departmental Council of Creuse Conseil départemental de la Creuse
- Flag of the Council

Leadership
- President: Valerie Simonet, LR since 2 April 2015

Meeting place
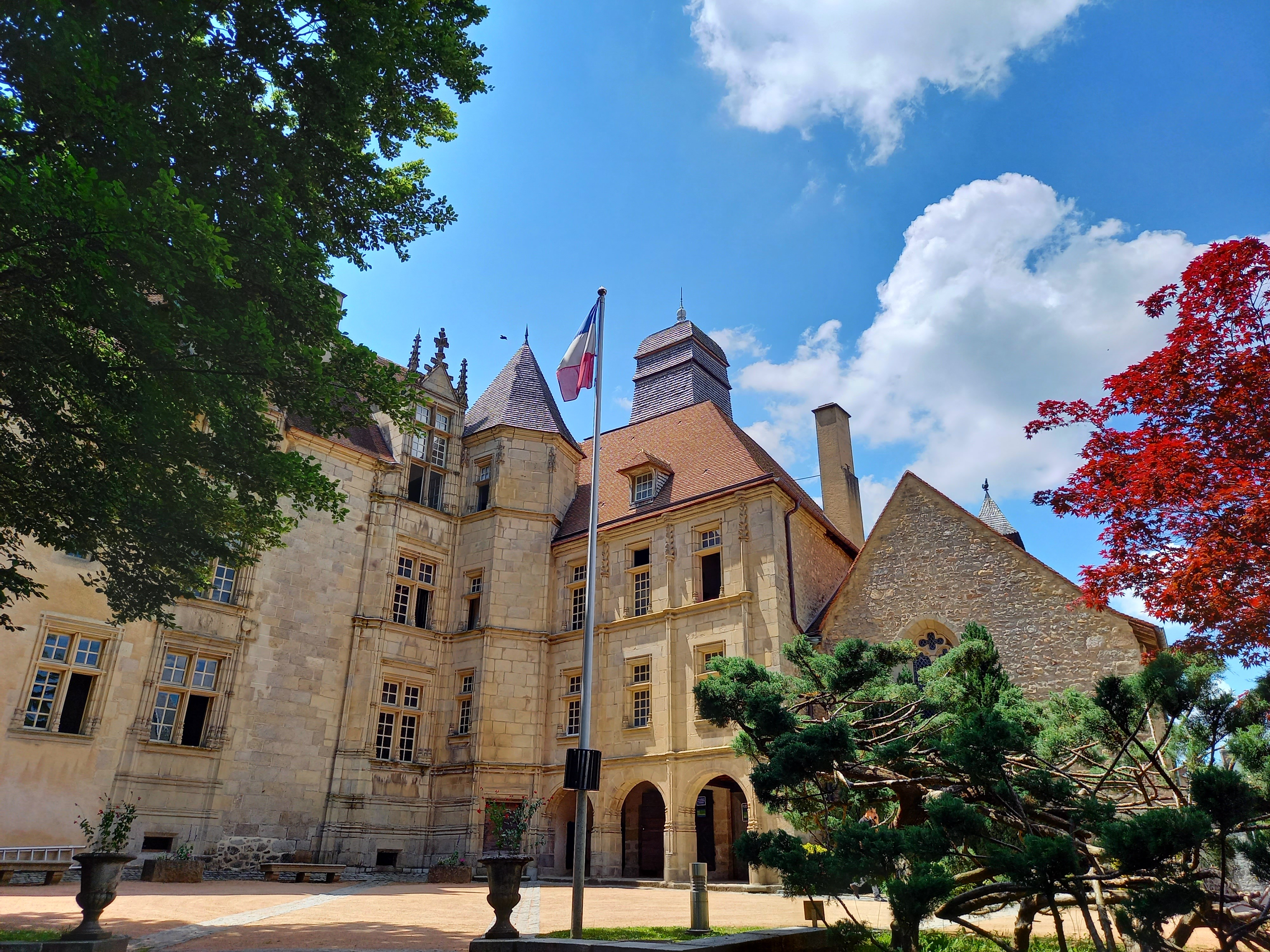
- Hôtel des Moneyroux, Guéret

Departmental Council of Creuse (French: Conseil départemental de la Creuse) is the deliberative assembly of the French department of Creuse. Its headquarters is at Guéret.

== Executive ==
=== Presidents ===
Since 2015, the President of the Departmental Council is Valérie Simonet (LR). She was re-elected in the 2021 departmental elections.

List of successive presidents
Period		Name	Party
1945	1973	Paul Pauly	SFIO
1973	1983	André Chandernagor	PS
1983	1992	Michel Moreigne	PS
1992	1994	Thierry Chandernagor	PS
1994	1998	Bernard de Froment	RPR
1998	2001	Gérard Gaudin	DVD
2001	2015	Jean-Jacques Lozach	PS
2015	Incumbent	Valérie Simonet	LR

=== Vice-presidents ===
List of vice-presidents of the council (as of 2021)
Order	Name	Canton	Delegation(s)
1st	Thierry Gaillard	Ahun	General Affairs and modernization of public action
2nd	Catherine Defemme	Ahun	Beautification
3rd	Patrice Morançais	Gouzon	Social action, employment and housing
4th	Marie Christine Bunlon	Gouzon	Autonomy of the elderly
5th	Laurent Daulny	Dun-le-Palestel	Colleges, sports and youth
6th	Hélène Faivre	Dun-le-Palestel	Infrastructure and technology
7th	Nicolas Simonnet	Évaux-les-Bains	Territorial development

== Composition ==
The departmental council of Creuse includes 30 departmental councilors from the 15 cantons of Creuse.

Composition by party (as of 2021)
Party	Acronym	Seats	Groups
Majority (18 seats)
The Republicans	LR	12	La Creuse ambitieuse
Miscellaneous right	DVD	6	La Creuse ambitieuse
Opposition (12 seats)
Socialist Party	PS	8	United left
Miscellaneous left	DVG	4	United left
