= Moutier-Malcard =

Commune in Nouvelle-Aquitaine, France

- Commune
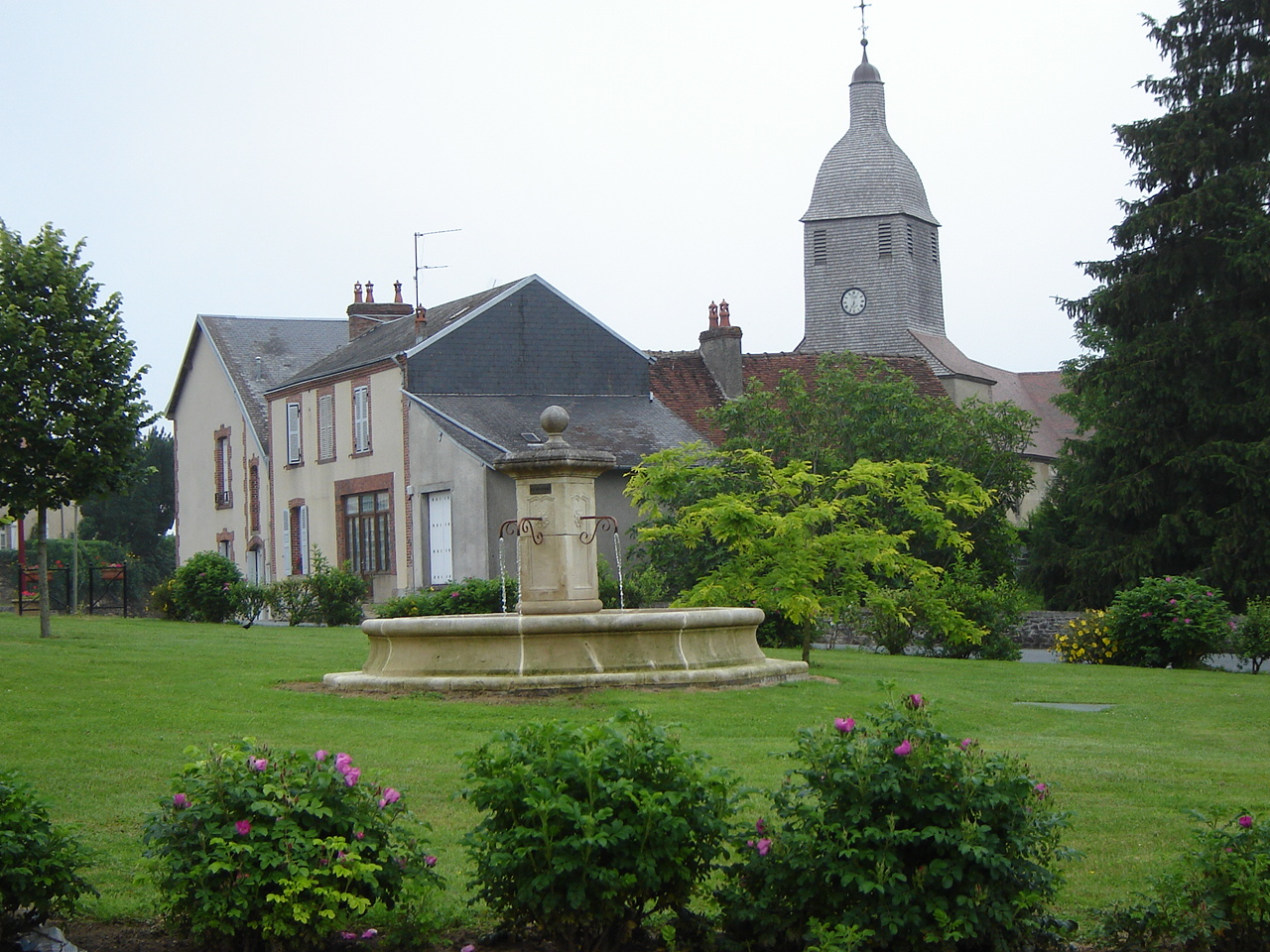
- The centre of Moutier-Malcard
- Location of Moutier-Malcard
- Location within France Location within Nouvelle-Aquitaine
- Coordinates: 46°23′41″N 1°56′45″E
- Country: France
- Region: Nouvelle-Aquitaine
- Department: Creuse
- Arrondissement: Guéret
- Canton: Bonnat
- Intercommunality: CC Portes de la Creuse en Marche

Government
  - Mayor (2020–2026): Pierre Guyot
- Area^{1}: 25.81 km^{2} (9.97 sq mi)
- Elevation: 363 m (1,191 ft)
- Highest elevation: 433 m (1,421 ft)
- Lowest elevation: 262 m (860 ft)
- Population (2023): 558
  - Density: 21.6/km^{2} (56.0/sq mi)
- Time zone: UTC+01:00 (CET)
  - Summer (DST): UTC+02:00 (CEST)
- INSEE/Postal code: 23139 /23220
- ^{1} French Land Register data, which excludes lakes, ponds, glaciers > 1 km^{2} (0.386 sq mi or 247 acres) and river estuaries.

Moutier-Malcard (French pronunciation: [mutje malkaʁ]; Occitan: Mostier Malcard) is a commune in the Creuse department in the Nouvelle-Aquitaine region in central France.

== Geography ==
A farming area comprising the village and several hamlets situated some 15 miles (24 km) north of Guéret at the junction of the D46, D56 and the D990 roads. The Petite Creuse river forms the southern boundary of the commune.

== Population ==
Historical population
| Year | Pop. | ±% p.a. |
|---|---|---|
| 1968 | 865 | — |
| 1975 | 747 | −2.07% |
| 1982 | 678 | −1.38% |
| 1990 | 573 | −2.08% |
| 1999 | 514 | −1.20% |
| 2007 | 540 | +0.62% |
| 2012 | 536 | −0.15% |
| 2017 | 536 | +0.00% |
| 2023 | 558 | +0.67% |
Source: INSEE

== Sights ==
- The church of St. Martin, dating from the twelfth century.
- A fifteenth-century donjon and stone cross.

== See also ==
- Communes of the Creuse department
