= Chabanne et partenaires =

French architectural and engineering firm

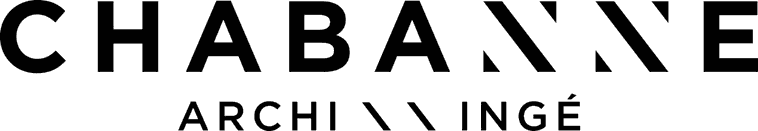

Practice information
- Firm type: Architecture and engineering
- Founders: Jean Chabanne
- Founded: 1969
- Location: Lyon, Rhône, France

Significant works and honors
- Buildings: Vélodrome National

Website
- www.agence-chabanne.fr

Chabanne et partenaires (English: Chabanne and Partners), also known as Agence Chabanne, is an architectural and engineering firm based in Lyon, Rhône, France. Billed as France's fourth largest architectural firm by revenue, it is one of the country's usual candidates for public building contracts, submitting around 80 such tenders a year nationwide and abroad. Thus, the scope of the agency's work has remained wide, with only a loose specialization in sports, education and healthcare facilities that are typical of the market.

== History ==
Jean Chabanne (1946 – 2020), an alumn of the École des Beaux-Arts in Paris, founded his first architectural practice Ateliers Chabanne in 1969. Originally from Loire, Chabanne grew his business in Paris. In 1999, he acquired office space in Lyon and relaunched his practice as Chabanne et partenaires, a hybrid firm housing both architecture and engineering specialists.

The agency has antennas in Paris, Aix-en-Provence and Saint-Etienne. It has also maintained offices in Montpellier and Geneva, Switzerland in the past. Jean Chabanne's son Nicolas (born 1974) succeeded him at the head of the practice in 2011.

== Selected works ==
Below is a selected list of works by Jean Chabanne, Nicolas Chabanne and their associated agencies:

- Edmond Nocard Building at National Veterinary School in Alfort
- Angers IceParc
- Centre aquatique d'Aubervilliers (2024)
- Stade nautique Bordeaux Métropole in Mérignac (2022)
- Palais des sports de Caen (2023)
- Aren'Ice in Cergy
- Halle Stéphane-Diagana in Lyon
- Terminal 1 at Lyon–Saint-Exupéry Airport (with Rogers Stirk Harbour + Partners)
- Palais omnisports Marseille Grand-Est
- Aquarium Mare Nostrum at Planet Ocean in Montpellier
- Campus Diagana Sport-Santé in Mougins
- Palais des congrès de Nîmes (2025)
- Robert-Poirier Stadium at Rennes 2 University
- Grand Palais Éphémère in Paris (engineering)
- Piscine Yvonne-Godard in Paris
- Vélodrome National de Saint-Quentin-en-Yvelines
- SIG Arena in Strasbourg (2024)
- Palais des sports Jauréguiberry in Toulon
- Stade de l'Aube in Troyes (2004 redevelopment)
- Cité des congrès in Valenciennes
