= Lourdoueix-Saint-Pierre =

Commune in Nouvelle-Aquitaine, France

- Commune
- Location of Lourdoueix-Saint-Pierre
- Location within France Location within Nouvelle-Aquitaine
- Coordinates: 46°24′38″N 1°49′23″E
- Country: France
- Region: Nouvelle-Aquitaine
- Department: Creuse
- Arrondissement: Guéret
- Canton: Bonnat
- Intercommunality: CC Portes de la Creuse en Marche

Government
  - Mayor (2020–2026): Roger Langlois
- Area^{1}: 44.73 km^{2} (17.27 sq mi)
- Elevation: 380 m (1,250 ft)
- Highest elevation: 433 m (1,421 ft)
- Lowest elevation: 217 m (712 ft)
- Population (2023): 711
  - Density: 15.9/km^{2} (41.2/sq mi)
- Time zone: UTC+01:00 (CET)
  - Summer (DST): UTC+02:00 (CEST)
- INSEE/Postal code: 23112 /23360
- ^{1} French Land Register data, which excludes lakes, ponds, glaciers > 1 km^{2} (0.386 sq mi or 247 acres) and river estuaries.

Lourdoueix-Saint-Pierre (French pronunciation: [luʁdwɛ sɛ̃ pjɛʁ]; Occitan: L'Ordoir Sant Ròca) is a commune in the Creuse department in the Nouvelle-Aquitaine region in central France.

== Geography ==
An area of streams, lakes and farming, comprising the village and some small hamlets, situated some 15 miles (24 km) north of Guéret at the junction of the D6, D48 and the D915 roads. The Petite Creuse river forms much of the south-western boundary of the commune's territory, whilst to the north lies the department of Indre.

== Population ==
Historical population
Year	Pop.	±% p.a.
1968	1,425	—
1975	1,266	−1.68%
1982	1,100	−1.99%
1990	1,034	−0.77%
1999	923	−1.25%
2007	864	−0.82%
2012	786	−1.87%
2017	773	−0.33%
2023	711	−1.38%
Source: INSEE

== Sights ==
- The church of St. Pierre, dating from the fifteenth century.
- A menhir.
- Traces of a Roman settlement called the "Fossé de Châtres".
- The fourteenth-century castle at the hamlet of Vost, rebuilt in the nineteenth century.
- The chapel at Lignaud, dating from the thirteenth century.

== See also ==
- Communes of the Creuse department
