= Palais Omnisports Marseille Grand-Est =

Arena in Marseille, France

Coordinates: 43.28207°N 5.40174°E

- Interactive map of Palais Omnisports; Marseille Grand-Est
- Address: 12 boulevard Fernand Bonnefoy; France
- Location: Marseille
- Capacity: 5600 (ice hockey)
- Surface: 21,487 m^{2}
- Field size: 60 × 30 metre

Construction
- Groundbreaking: 26 April 2007
- Opened: 11 December 2009
- Cost: € 48 million
- Architect: Chabanne et partenaires
- Main contractors: Gagne Construction Métallique; Chagnaud Construction; SPIE Batignolles/Valérian

Tenants
- Gabians de Marseille (2009–2012); Spartiates de Marseille (2012–present)

The Palais Omnisports Marseille Grand-Est (French for 'Marseille Great Eastern Multisport Palace'), abbreviated as POMGE, is a multi-purpose arena primarily used as an ice rink, located in Marseille, Bouches-du-Rhône, France. It is the home venue for ice hockey team Spartiates de Marseille. The complex also houses a skate park which, at the time of its opening, was billed as the largest such indoor installation in Europe.
It was inaugurated in 2009, and is popularly known as Patinoire de la Capelette after the Marseille quarter it sits in, la Capelette.

== History ==
Ice availability has historically been an issue in the Marseille metropolitan area, one of the France's three largest agglomerations.

A semi-permanent 56 × 26 metre rink was built at the Parc des Expositions Marseille-Chanot in the wake of the 1968 Grenoble Olympics, which introduced ice sports to the broader French public, but it was dismantled in 1974.

A new ice rink, Patinoire du Rouet, opened the same year inside a repurposed fruit packing plant, but it was severely undersized at 40 × 20 metre. The facility closed in 1984 and no other venue would be active in the area until 1993, when a recreational rink measuring 46 × 20 metre opened on Avenue Jules Cantini. However it closed within two years.

Another rink called Megaglace opened in 1994 near the neighbouring college town of Aix-en-Provence. Built inside an old sanitary ware retail space and measuring 42 × 20 metre, it again fell short of the standards expected from a major agglomeration.
Finally in 1998, a sister facility called Megaglace 2 opened in Aubagne. Although still relatively spartan, it boasted a small stand and a 56 × 26 metre track, in compliance with minimum IIHF regulations.

In March 2004, the municipality of Marseille launched preliminary consultations to give the city a suitable ice sports facility as part of a broader urban rehabilitation plan. In March 2005, the project presented by architectural firm Chabanne et partenaires was selected. During most of its planning and building phases, it was tentatively known as Palais de la glace et de la glisse de Marseille.

After some delays, the facility was inaugurated on 11 December 2009, under the new name Palais omnisports Marseille Grand-Est. The ceremony was attended by Minister of Sports Roselyne Bachelot-Narquin, and featured an exhibition by former ISU World Champion ice dancers Isabelle Delobel and Olivier Schoenfelder.

== Building ==
The POMGE cost an estimated €48 million to build, with most of the work split between main contractors Gagne Construction Métallique, Chagnaud Construction and SPIE Batignolles/Valérian.

=== Ice rink ===
At 5,600 in hockey configuration, the main hall is the largest permanent ice rink in France in terms of spectator capacity, which excludes ice capable entertainment venues such as Paris' Accor Arena, regular home of the ice hockey Coupe de France final. It features an 1800 m^{2} Olympic size pad.
The second ice rink is a recreational track, and has an unconventional shape consisting of circular areas and elliptical corridors. It has a surface of 1250 m^{2}.

=== Skate park ===
In addition to the ice facilities, the Palais offers a 3500 m^{2} indoor skate park for roller skating, skateboarding and BMX activities. It has a capacity of 750 spectators, extensible to 1500.

== Notable events ==
- 2010 French Figure Skating Championships
- 2015 ice hockey Coupe de France Final
- 2017 ISU Grand Prix Final
