= Champsanglard =

Commune in Nouvelle-Aquitaine, France

- Commune
- Location of Champsanglard
- Location within France Location within Nouvelle-Aquitaine
- Coordinates: 46°16′32″N 1°52′55″E
- Country: France
- Region: Nouvelle-Aquitaine
- Department: Creuse
- Arrondissement: Guéret
- Canton: Bonnat
- Intercommunality: CC Portes de la Creuse en Marche

Government
  - Mayor (2020–2026): Sylvain Duqueroix
- Area^{1}: 13.64 km^{2} (5.27 sq mi)
- Elevation: 373 m (1,224 ft)
- Highest elevation: 498 m (1,634 ft)
- Lowest elevation: 274 m (899 ft)
- Population (2023): 253
  - Density: 18.5/km^{2} (48.0/sq mi)
- Time zone: UTC+01:00 (CET)
  - Summer (DST): UTC+02:00 (CEST)
- INSEE/Postal code: 23049 /23220
- ^{1} French Land Register data, which excludes lakes, ponds, glaciers > 1 km^{2} (0.386 sq mi or 247 acres) and river estuaries.

Champsanglard (French pronunciation: [ʃɑ̃sɑ̃ɡlaʁ]; Occitan: Champ Sanglard) is a commune in the Creuse department in the Nouvelle-Aquitaine region in central France.

== Geography ==
An area of forestry, farming, lakes and streams comprising the village and several hamlets situated some 7 miles (11 km) north of Guéret, at the junction of the D14, D8 and the D33. The river Creuse forms the southern boundary of the commune.

== Population ==
Historical population
| Year | Pop. | ±% p.a. |
|---|---|---|
| 1968 | 328 | — |
| 1975 | 241 | −4.31% |
| 1982 | 205 | −2.28% |
| 1990 | 202 | −0.18% |
| 1999 | 208 | +0.33% |
| 2007 | 227 | +1.10% |
| 2012 | 226 | −0.09% |
| 2017 | 248 | +1.88% |
| 2023 | 253 | +0.33% |
Source: INSEE

== Sights ==
- The church of St. Martin, dating from the twelfth
- The castle of Lasvy

== See also ==
- Communes of the Creuse department
