= La Forêt-du-Temple =

Commune in Nouvelle-Aquitaine, France

- Commune
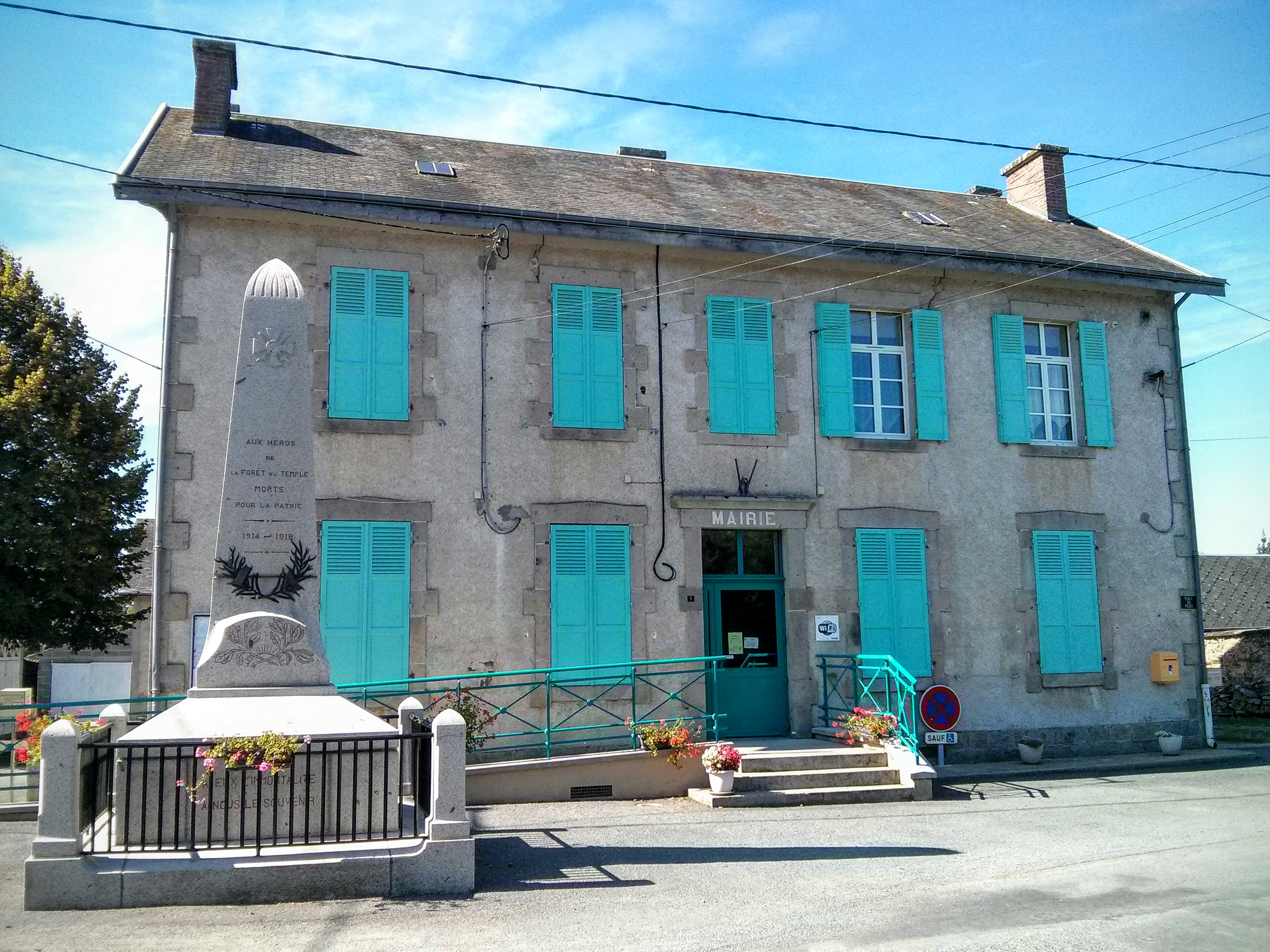
- The village hall and war memorial.

- Coat of arms
- Location of La Forêt-du-Temple
- Location within France Location within Nouvelle-Aquitaine
- Coordinates: 46°25′18″N 1°54′12″E
- Country: France
- Region: Nouvelle-Aquitaine
- Department: Creuse
- Arrondissement: Guéret
- Canton: Bonnat
- Intercommunality: CC Portes de la Creuse en Marche

Government
  - Mayor (2020–2026): Eveline Moulin
- Area^{1}: 7.72 km^{2} (2.98 sq mi)
- Elevation: 400 m (1,300 ft)
- Highest elevation: 462 m (1,516 ft)
- Lowest elevation: 360 m (1,180 ft)
- Population (2023): 143
  - Density: 18.5/km^{2} (48.0/sq mi)
- Time zone: UTC+01:00 (CET)
  - Summer (DST): UTC+02:00 (CEST)
- INSEE/Postal code: 23084 /23360
- ^{1} French Land Register data, which excludes lakes, ponds, glaciers > 1 km^{2} (0.386 sq mi or 247 acres) and river estuaries.

La Forêt-du-Temple (French pronunciation: [la fɔʁɛ dy tɑ̃pl], literally The Forest of the Temple; Occitan: La Forest dau Temple) is a commune in the Creuse department in the Nouvelle-Aquitaine region in central France.

== Geography ==
An area of farming and quarrying comprising the village and a few small hamlets situated on the boundary with the department of Indre, some 19 miles (31 km) north of Guéret at the junction of the D990 and the D116 roads.

== Population ==
Historical population
Year	Pop.	±% p.a.
1968	337	—
1975	264	−3.43%
1982	190	−4.59%
1990	163	−1.90%
1999	151	−0.85%
2007	154	+0.25%
2012	145	−1.20%
2017	143	−0.28%
2023	143	+0.00%
Source: INSEE

== Sights ==
- The church of Notre-Dame, dating from the twelfth century.
- A war memorial, including the name of a woman who died of grief after her three sons were killed in World War I.

== See also ==
- Communes of the Creuse department
