= Saint-Dizier-les-Domaines =

Commune in Nouvelle-Aquitaine, France

- Commune
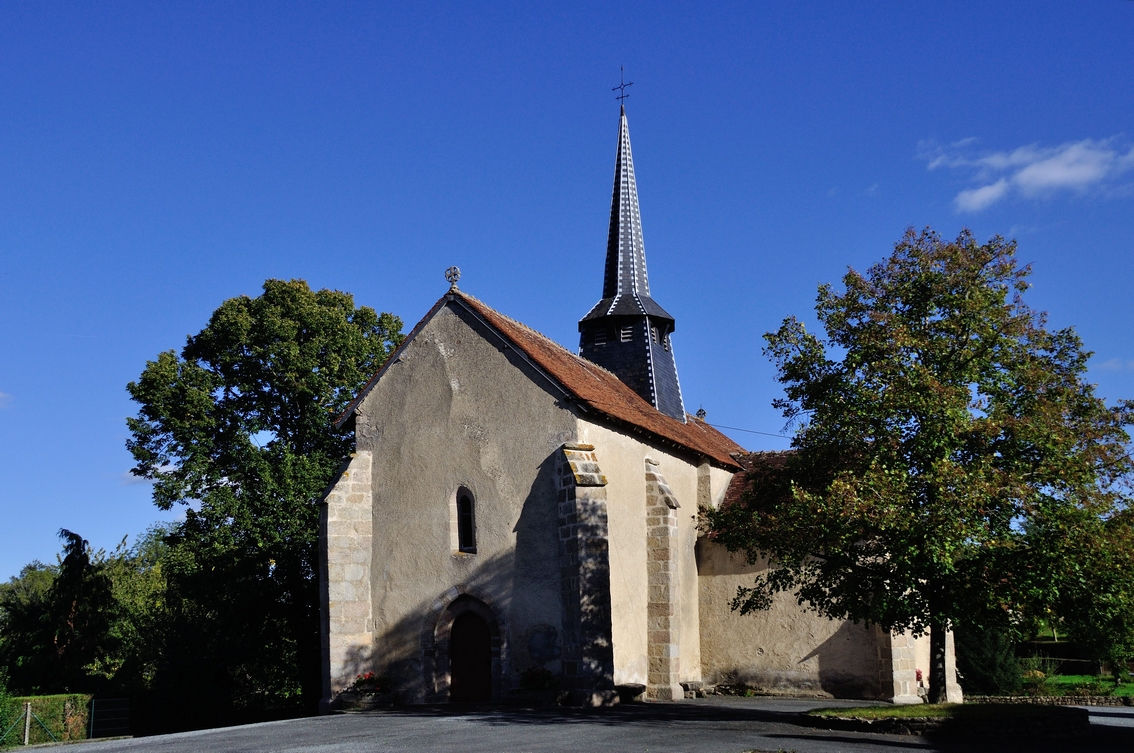
- The church in Saint-Dizier-les-Domaines
- Location of Saint-Dizier-les-Domaines
- Location within France Location within Nouvelle-Aquitaine
- Coordinates: 46°19′11″N 2°02′07″E
- Country: France
- Region: Nouvelle-Aquitaine
- Department: Creuse
- Arrondissement: Guéret
- Canton: Bonnat
- Intercommunality: CC Portes de la Creuse en Marche

Government
  - Mayor (2020–2026): Camille Dumas
- Area^{1}: 15.89 km^{2} (6.14 sq mi)
- Elevation: 330 m (1,080 ft)
- Highest elevation: 422 m (1,385 ft)
- Lowest elevation: 279 m (915 ft)
- Population (2023): 207
  - Density: 13.0/km^{2} (33.7/sq mi)
- Time zone: UTC+01:00 (CET)
  - Summer (DST): UTC+02:00 (CEST)
- INSEE/Postal code: 23188 /23270
- ^{1} French Land Register data, which excludes lakes, ponds, glaciers > 1 km^{2} (0.386 sq mi or 247 acres) and river estuaries.

Saint-Dizier-les-Domaines (French pronunciation: [sɛ̃ dizje le dɔmɛn]; Occitan: Sent Desíer lo Zònas) is a commune in the Creuse department in central France.

== Geography ==
The river Petite Creuse forms part of the commune's northeastern border.

== Population ==
Historical population
Year	Pop.	±% p.a.
1968	325	—
1975	297	−1.28%
1982	242	−2.88%
1990	215	−1.47%
1999	199	−0.86%
2007	197	−0.13%
2012	180	−1.79%
2017	195	+1.61%
2023	207	+1.00%
Source: INSEE

== See also ==
- Communes of the Creuse department
