= La Cellette, Creuse =

Commune in Nouvelle-Aquitaine, France

La Cellette
- Commune
- Location of La Cellette
- Location within France Location within Nouvelle-Aquitaine
- Coordinates: 46°24′17″N 2°00′54″E
- Country: France
- Region: Nouvelle-Aquitaine
- Department: Creuse
- Arrondissement: Guéret
- Canton: Bonnat
- Intercommunality: CC Portes de la Creuse en Marche

Government
  - Mayor (2020–2026): Camille Carcat
- Area^{1}: 21.48 km^{2} (8.29 sq mi)
- Elevation: 352 m (1,155 ft)
- Highest elevation: 432 m (1,417 ft)
- Lowest elevation: 294 m (965 ft)
- Population (2023): 266
  - Density: 12.4/km^{2} (32.1/sq mi)
- Time zone: UTC+01:00 (CET)
  - Summer (DST): UTC+02:00 (CEST)
- INSEE/Postal code: 23041 /23350
- ^{1} French Land Register data, which excludes lakes, ponds, glaciers > 1 km^{2} (0.386 sq mi or 247 acres) and river estuaries.

La Cellette (French pronunciation: [la selɛt]; Occitan: La Celeta) is a commune in the Creuse department in the Nouvelle-Aquitaine region in central France.

== Geography ==
A farming area comprising the village and a few small hamlets situated some 18 miles (29 km) north of Guéret at the junction of the D2, D3 and the D87 roads. The commune, with many streams, woods and lakes, borders the department of Indre.

== Population ==
Historical population
Year	Pop.	±% p.a.
1968	576	—
1975	491	−2.26%
1982	441	−1.52%
1990	340	−3.20%
1999	283	−2.02%
2007	272	−0.49%
2012	270	−0.15%
2017	254	−1.21%
2023	266	+0.77%
Source: INSEE

== Sights ==
- The church of St. Pierre and St. Paul, dating from the twelfth century.
- The chateau Pointu.
- A memorial to a World War II aeroplane crash.

== See also ==
- Communes of the Creuse department
