= Angers IceParc =

Ice rink in France

- Interactive map of Angers IceParc
- Location: 5 avenue de la Constitution, Angers
- Coordinates: 47.4797°N 0.5490°W
- Owner: City of Angers
- Capacity: 3586 (ice hockey)
- Field size: 60 × 30 metre

Construction
- Opened: 16 September 2019
- Cost: €38,000,000
- Architect: Chabanne et Partenaires

Tenant
- Ducs d'Angers (2019–present)

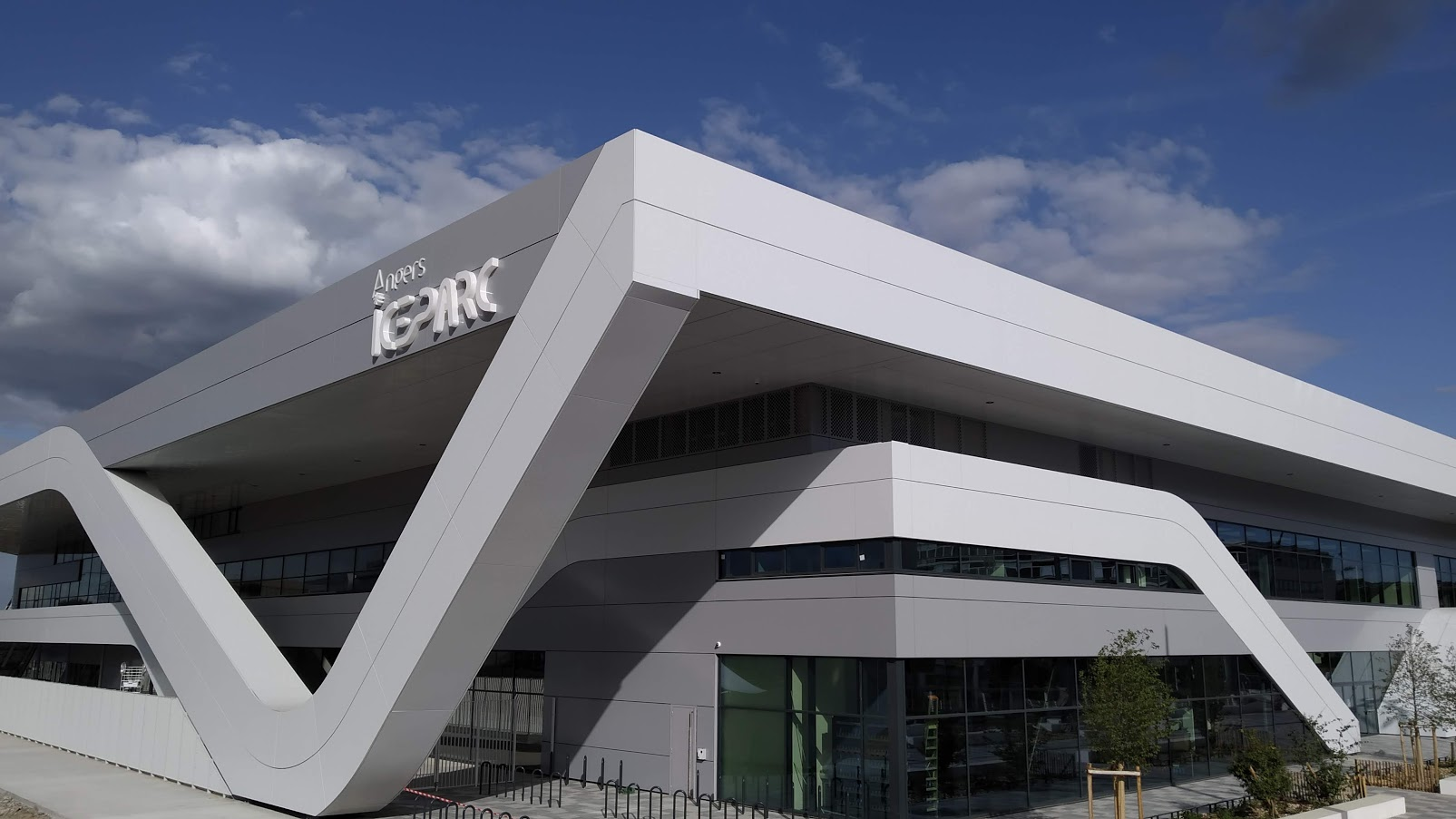
Angers Icepark

Angers IceParc is an ice rink located in Angers, Maine-et-Loire, France. It consists of a main arena featuring a 60 × 30 metre rink, and a second hall offering a training rink of the same dimensions. It is the home venue for professional ice hockey team Ducs d'Angers.
The building was designed by Chabanne et Partenaires, sports venue specialists who previously worked on several other French ice rinks.
