= Regional Council of Limousin =

Former regional legislature in France

Regional Council of Limousin Conseil régional du Limousin
- Logo of the Council

History
- Founded: 1974
- Disbanded: 31 December 2015
- Preceded by: Regional Council of Nouvelle-Aquitaine

Leadership
- President: Gérard Vandenbroucke, PS

Meeting place
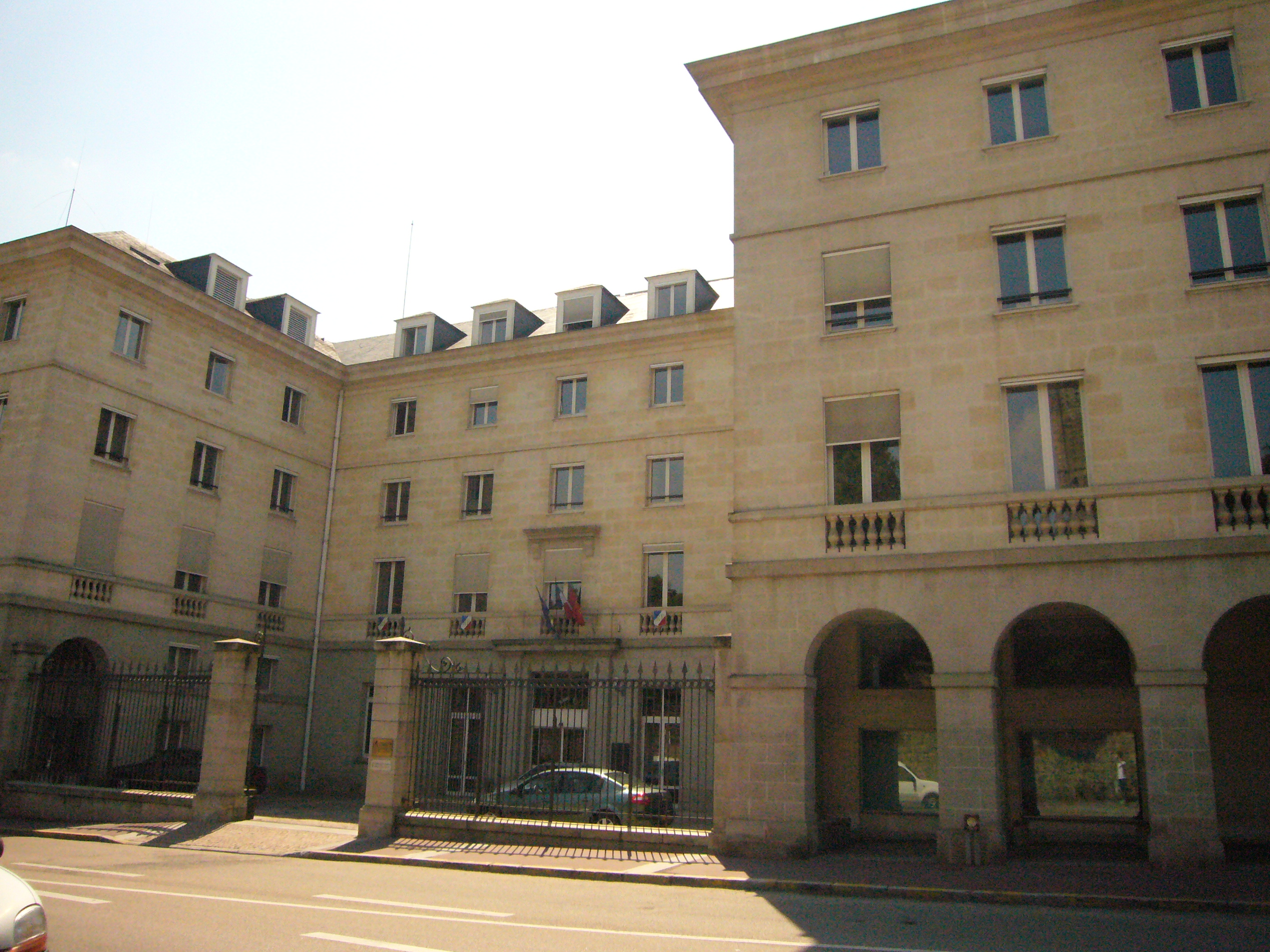
- Hôtel de région du Limousin, Limoges

Website
- www.regionlimousin.fr

Regional Council of Limousin (French: Conseil régional du Limousin, Occitan: Conselh regional de Lemosin) was the deliberative assembly of the French region of Limousin until 31 December 2015, following the incorporation of the region with Poitou-Charentes and Aquitaine in order to form the new region Nouvelle-Aquitaine.

It had 43 members as of 2015, with its headquarters in the Hôtel de région located in Limoges. The building was constructed between 1986 and 1988, designed by architect Christian Langlois.

Its last president was Gérard Vandenbroucke (PS), elected on 14 October 2014.

== History ==
The Limousin Regional Council was the only one in France, with that of Nord-Pas-de-Calais, to have been constantly dominated by the left, and the only one to have only had socialist presidents.

The law of July 19, 1985 defined the terms of election of regional councilors, the number of which must correspond to twice the total number of parliamentarians in the region, to which one seat is added to avoid possible blockages. This rule was to give 29 seats to the Limousin regional council, but pressure from Louis Longequeue and Jean-Claude Cassaing allowed Limousin to obtain an exemption, with 41 seats (43 from 1991).

List of successive presidents
Period	Name	Party
1974 – 1981	André Chandernagor	PS
1981 – 1986	Louis Longequeue	PS
1986 – 2004	Robert Savy	PS
2004 – 2014	Jean-Paul Denanot	PS
2014 – 2015	Gérard Vandenbroucke	PS

== Distribution of seats ==
The regional council was composed of 43 members, distributed as follows:

- 15 elected officials for Corrèze
- 7 elected officials for Creuse
- 21 elected officials for Haute-Vienne

== Associated organizations ==
- Regional Economic, Social and Environmental Council (French: Conseil économique, social et environnemental régional, CESER)
- Limousin Regional Youth Council (French: Conseil régional des jeunes du Limousin, CRJ) and Limousin Youth Citizen Forum (French: Forum citoyen des jeunes Limousins)
- Limousin Expansion (economic development agency)
- Dynalim (co-investment fund)
- Prisme Limousin (regional employment and training resource center)
- Economic and cultural development agency (French: Agence de valorisation économique et culturelle, AVEC)
