= Nouziers =

Commune in Nouvelle-Aquitaine, France

- Commune
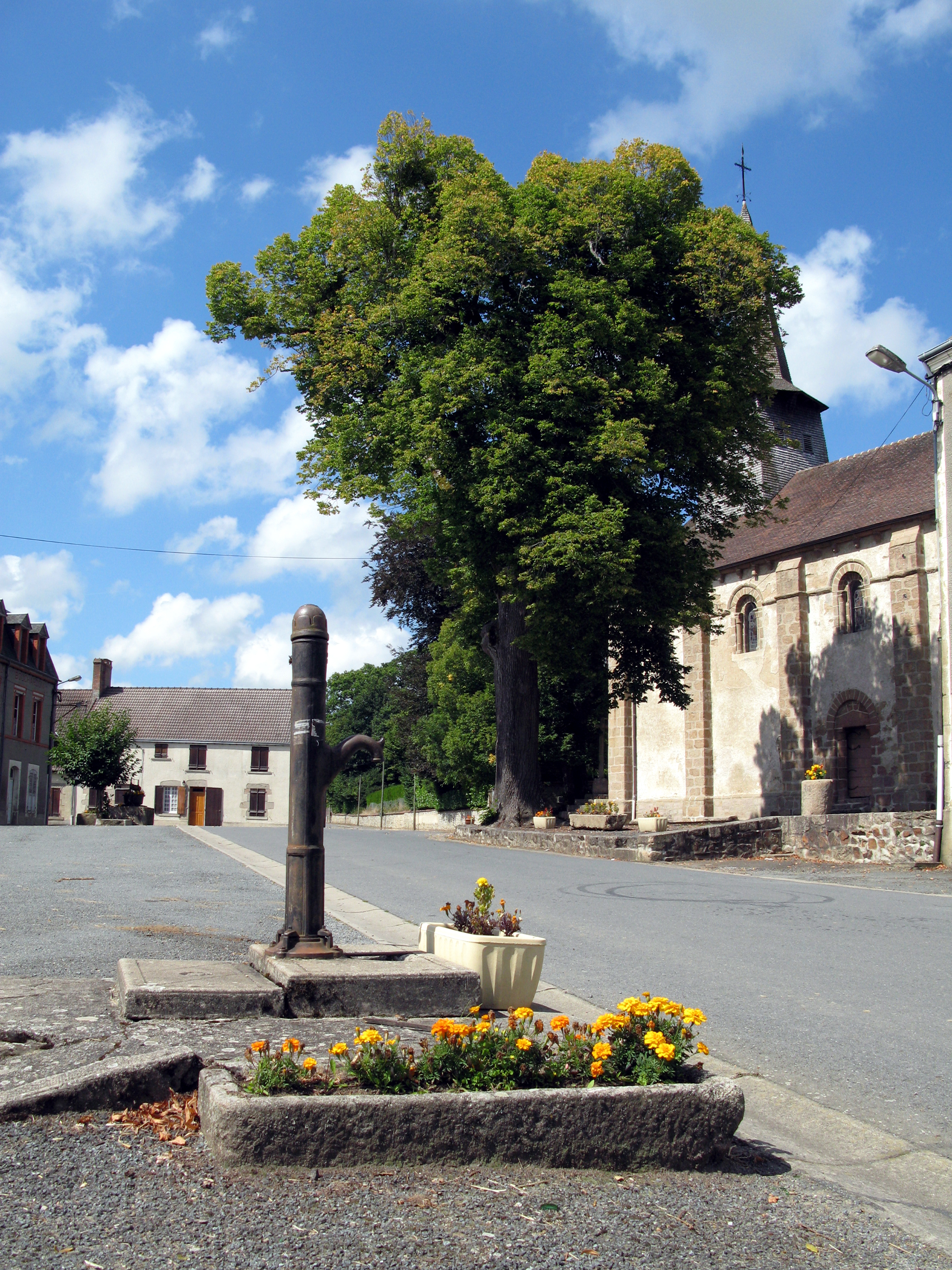
- The centre of the village of Nouziers

- Coat of arms
- Location of Nouziers
- Location within France Location within Nouvelle-Aquitaine
- Coordinates: 46°25′21″N 1°57′31″E
- Country: France
- Region: Nouvelle-Aquitaine
- Department: Creuse
- Arrondissement: Guéret
- Canton: Bonnat
- Intercommunality: CC Portes de la Creuse en Marche

Government
  - Mayor (2020–2026): Roger Appère
- Area^{1}: 14.33 km^{2} (5.53 sq mi)
- Elevation: 410 m (1,350 ft)
- Highest elevation: 466 m (1,529 ft)
- Lowest elevation: 342 m (1,122 ft)
- Population (2023): 245
  - Density: 17.1/km^{2} (44.3/sq mi)
- Time zone: UTC+01:00 (CET)
  - Summer (DST): UTC+02:00 (CEST)
- INSEE/Postal code: 23148 /23350
- ^{1} French Land Register data, which excludes lakes, ponds, glaciers > 1 km^{2} (0.386 sq mi or 247 acres) and river estuaries.

Nouziers (French pronunciation: [nuzje]; Occitan: Nosiers) is a commune in the Creuse department in the Nouvelle-Aquitaine region in central France.

== Geography ==
An area of forestry and farming comprising the village and several hamlets, situated on the border with the department of Indre, some 16 miles (26 km) north of Guéret, at the junction of the D2 and the D56 roads with the D940.

== Population ==
Historical population
Year	Pop.	±% p.a.
1968	505	—
1975	385	−3.80%
1982	276	−4.64%
1990	278	+0.09%
1999	232	−1.99%
2007	244	+0.63%
2012	237	−0.58%
2017	240	+0.25%
2023	245	+0.34%
Source: INSEE

== Sights ==
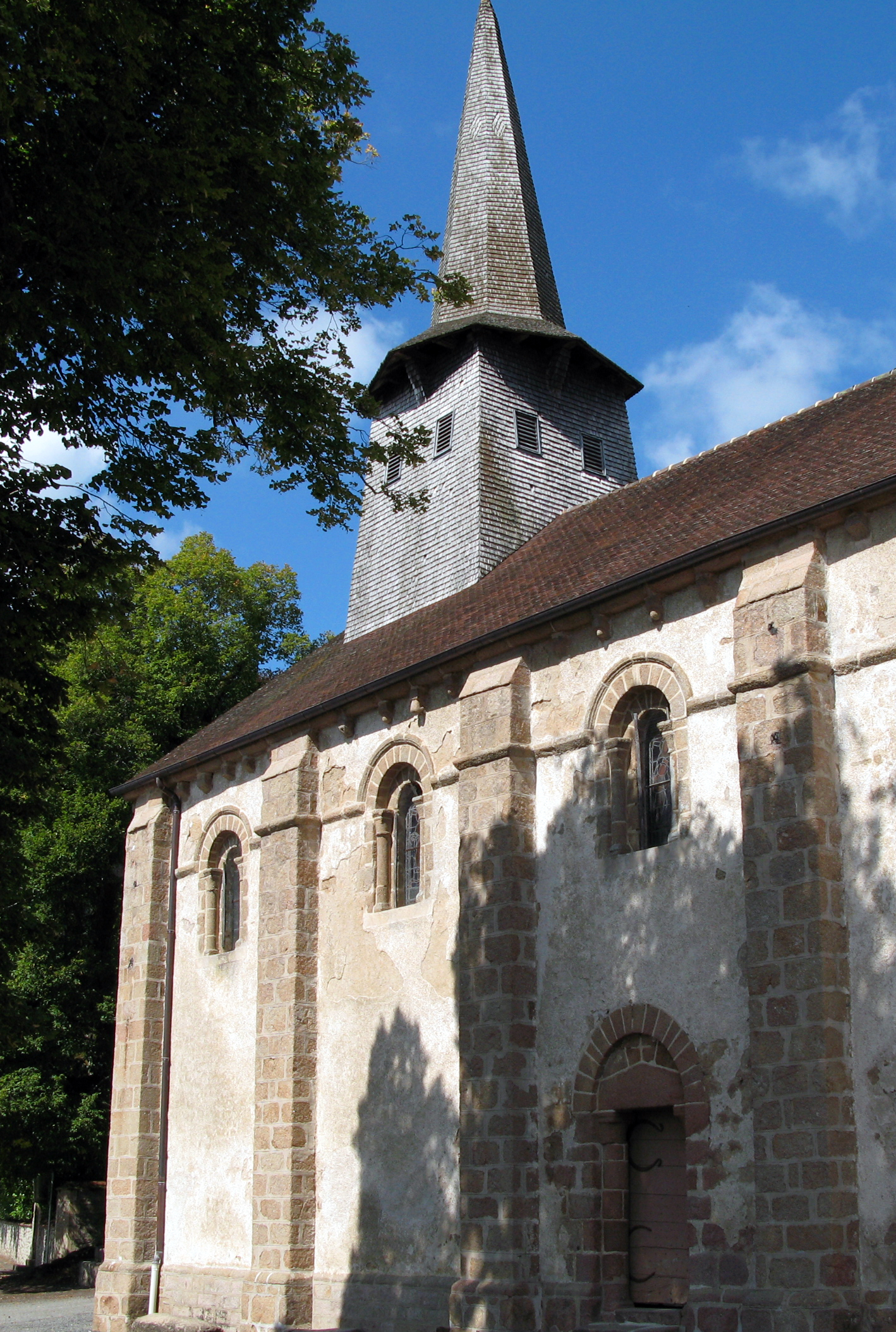
The church

- The twelfth-century church.
- The remains of two ancient chateaux.
- An old stone cross.
- The war memorial.

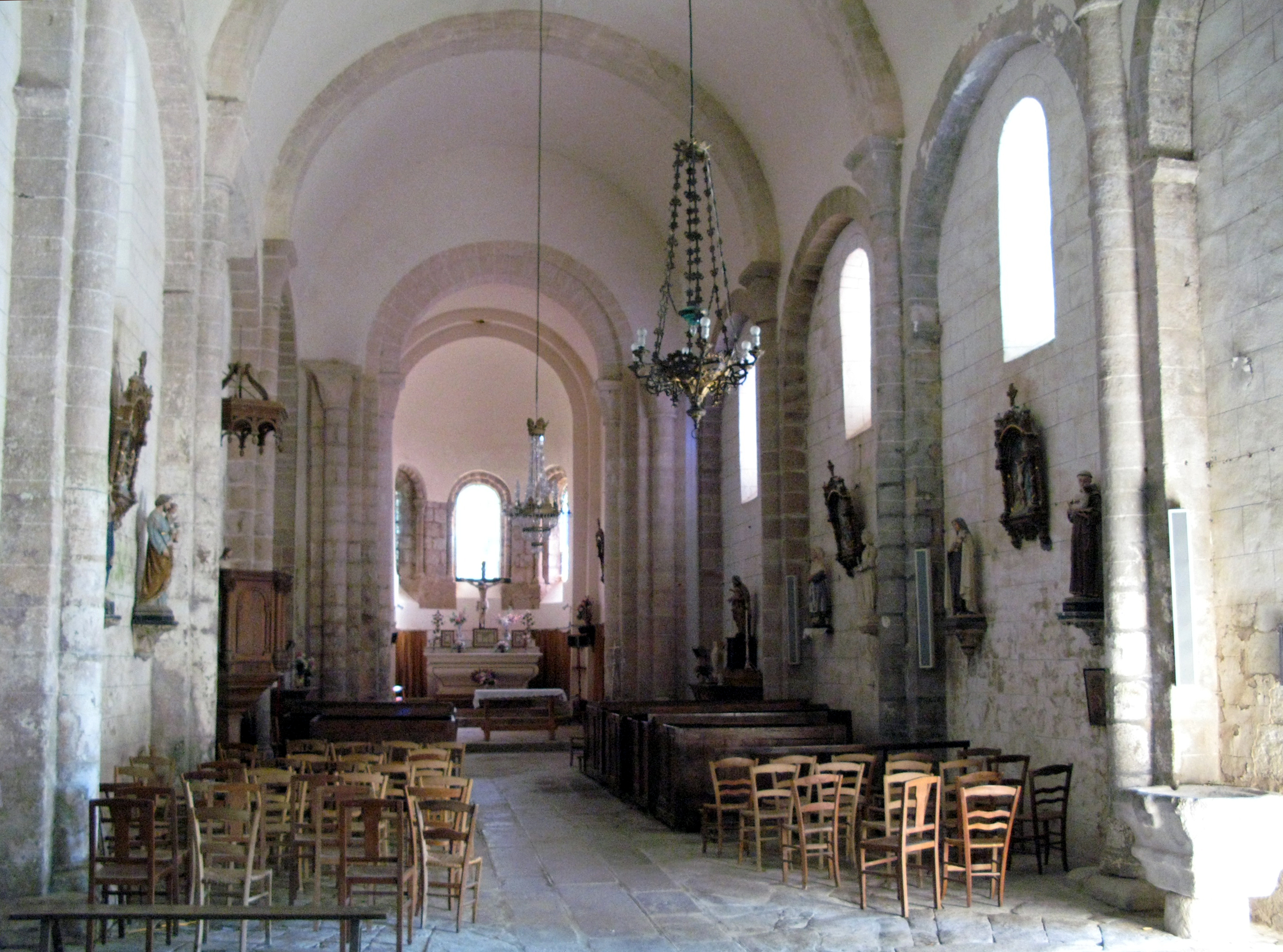
The church interior

== See also ==
- Communes of the Creuse department
