= Mortroux =

Commune in Nouvelle-Aquitaine, France

- Commune
- Coat of arms
- Location of Mortroux
- Location within France Location within Nouvelle-Aquitaine
- Coordinates: 46°23′54″N 1°54′58″E
- Country: France
- Region: Nouvelle-Aquitaine
- Department: Creuse
- Arrondissement: Guéret
- Canton: Bonnat
- Intercommunality: CC Portes de la Creuse en Marche

Government
  - Mayor (2020–2026): Guy Marsaleix
- Area^{1}: 13.28 km^{2} (5.13 sq mi)
- Elevation: 420 m (1,380 ft)
- Highest elevation: 424 m (1,391 ft)
- Lowest elevation: 300 m (980 ft)
- Population (2023): 277
  - Density: 20.9/km^{2} (54.0/sq mi)
- Time zone: UTC+01:00 (CET)
  - Summer (DST): UTC+02:00 (CEST)
- INSEE/Postal code: 23136 /23220
- ^{1} French Land Register data, which excludes lakes, ponds, glaciers > 1 km^{2} (0.386 sq mi or 247 acres) and river estuaries.

Mortroux (French pronunciation: [mɔʁtʁu]; Occitan: Mortròu) is a commune in the Creuse department in the Nouvelle-Aquitaine region of central France.

== Geography ==
A farming area comprising the village and a couple of hamlets situated some 14 miles (23 km) north of Guéret at the junction of the D46, D56 and the D56a roads.

== Population ==
Historical population
Year	Pop.	±% p.a.
1968	484	—
1975	420	−2.01%
1982	384	−1.27%
1990	331	−1.84%
1999	318	−0.44%
2007	307	−0.44%
2012	298	−0.59%
2017	285	−0.89%
2023	277	−0.47%
Source: INSEE

== Sights ==
- The church, dating from the twelfth century.
- A seventeenth-century lime-tree, the "Sully", named after a Prime Minister under the reign of Henri IV.
- Pottery finials above windows on a couple of houses.

== See also ==
- Communes of the Creuse department
