= Genouillac, Creuse =

Commune in Nouvelle-Aquitaine, France

Genouillac
- Commune
- Coat of arms
- Location of Genouillac
- Location within France Location within Nouvelle-Aquitaine
- Coordinates: 46°21′12″N 1°59′35″E
- Country: France
- Region: Nouvelle-Aquitaine
- Department: Creuse
- Arrondissement: Guéret
- Canton: Bonnat
- Intercommunality: CC Portes de la Creuse en Marche

Government
  - Mayor (2020–2026): Jean-Claude Arousseau
- Area^{1}: 35.76 km^{2} (13.81 sq mi)
- Elevation: 301 m (988 ft)
- Highest elevation: 406 m (1,332 ft)
- Lowest elevation: 266 m (873 ft)
- Population (2023): 721
  - Density: 20.2/km^{2} (52.2/sq mi)
- Time zone: UTC+01:00 (CET)
  - Summer (DST): UTC+02:00 (CEST)
- INSEE/Postal code: 23089 /23350
- ^{1} French Land Register data, which excludes lakes, ponds, glaciers > 1 km^{2} (0.386 sq mi or 247 acres) and river estuaries.

Genouillac (French pronunciation: [ʒənujak]; Occitan: Genolhac) is a commune in the Creuse department in the Nouvelle-Aquitaine region in central France.

== Geography ==
An area of farming and light industry comprising the village and several hamlets situated by the banks of the Petite Creuse river, some 15 miles (24 km) north of Guéret at the junction of the D15, D940 and the D990 roads.

== Population ==
Historical population
Year	Pop.	±% p.a.
1968	1,010	—
1975	859	−2.29%
1982	783	−1.31%
1990	775	−0.13%
1999	781	+0.09%
2007	803	+0.35%
2012	772	−0.78%
2017	735	−0.98%
2023	721	−0.32%
Source: INSEE

== Sights ==
- The church of St. Pierre, dating from the thirteenth century.
- A disused railway viaduct of 16 stone arches.
- Traces of an ancient château.

== See also ==
- Communes of the Creuse department
