= Roches, Creuse =

Commune in Nouvelle-Aquitaine, France

Roches
- Commune
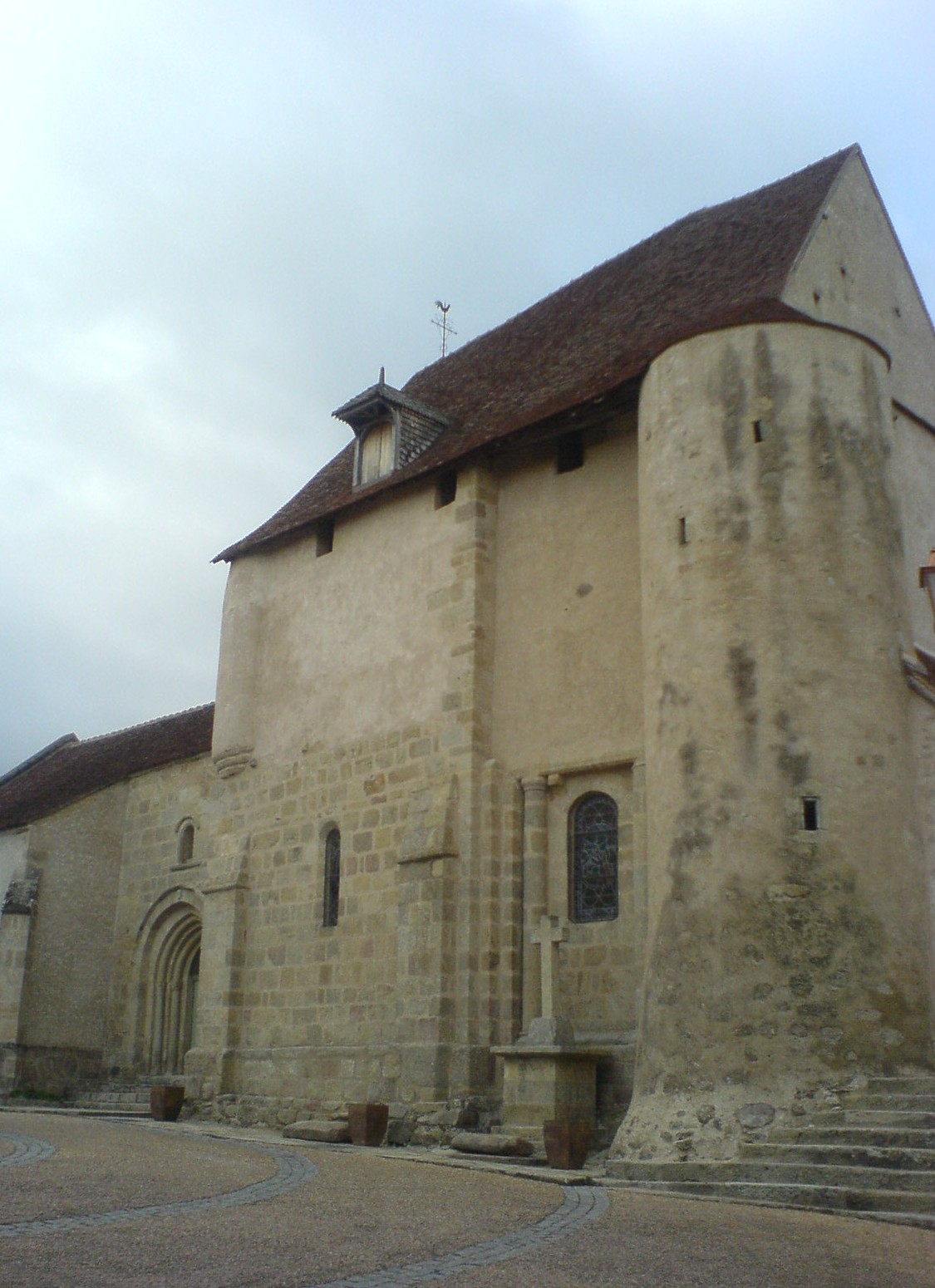
- The church in Roches
- Location of Roches
- Location within France Location within Nouvelle-Aquitaine
- Coordinates: 46°17′02″N 2°00′02″E
- Country: France
- Region: Nouvelle-Aquitaine
- Department: Creuse
- Arrondissement: Guéret
- Canton: Bonnat
- Intercommunality: CC Portes de la Creuse en Marche

Government
  - Mayor (2020–2026): Didier Thevenet
- Area^{1}: 25.55 km^{2} (9.86 sq mi)
- Elevation: 500 m (1,600 ft)
- Highest elevation: 566 m (1,857 ft)
- Lowest elevation: 365 m (1,198 ft)
- Population (2023): 371
  - Density: 14.5/km^{2} (37.6/sq mi)
- Time zone: UTC+01:00 (CET)
  - Summer (DST): UTC+02:00 (CEST)
- INSEE/Postal code: 23162 /23270
- ^{1} French Land Register data, which excludes lakes, ponds, glaciers > 1 km^{2} (0.386 sq mi or 247 acres) and river estuaries.

Roches (French pronunciation: [ʁɔʃ]; Occitan: Ròcas) is a commune in the Creuse department in the Nouvelle-Aquitaine region in central France.

== Geography ==
A farming area, comprising the village and several hamlets situated some 12 miles (19 km) northeast of Guéret, at the junction of the D9 and the D3 with the D14 road.

== Population ==
Historical population
Year	Pop.	±% p.a.
1968	535	—
1975	484	−1.42%
1982	463	−0.63%
1990	420	−1.21%
1999	389	−0.85%
2007	406	+0.54%
2012	372	−1.73%
2017	363	−0.49%
2023	371	+0.36%
Source: INSEE

== Sights ==
- The church, dating from the twelfth century.
- A fourteenth-century chapel at Chapelle-Malvalaise.
- The nineteenth-century chapel of Notre-Dame, at Richefolle.

== See also ==
- Communes of the Creuse department
