= Jalesches =

Commune in Nouvelle-Aquitaine, France

- Commune
- Location of Jalesches
- Location within France Location within Nouvelle-Aquitaine
- Coordinates: 46°18′07″N 2°05′48″E
- Country: France
- Region: Nouvelle-Aquitaine
- Department: Creuse
- Arrondissement: Guéret
- Canton: Boussac
- Intercommunality: Portes de la Creuse en Marche

Government
  - Mayor (2022–2026): Isabelle Humbert
- Area^{1}: 8.45 km^{2} (3.26 sq mi)
- Elevation: 450 m (1,480 ft)
- Highest elevation: 537 m (1,762 ft)
- Lowest elevation: 348 m (1,142 ft)
- Population (2023): 95
  - Density: 11/km^{2} (29/sq mi)
- Time zone: UTC+01:00 (CET)
  - Summer (DST): UTC+02:00 (CEST)
- INSEE/Postal code: 23098 /23270
- ^{1} French Land Register data, which excludes lakes, ponds, glaciers > 1 km^{2} (0.386 sq mi or 247 acres) and river estuaries.

Jalesches (French pronunciation: [ʒalɛʃ]) is a commune in the Creuse department in the Nouvelle-Aquitaine region in central France.

== Geography ==
An area of forestry and farming comprising a small village and a couple of hamlets situated some 15 miles (24 km) northeast of Guéret, at the junction of the D68 and the D14 roads.

== Population ==
Historical population
Year	Pop.	±% p.a.
1968	161	—
1975	142	−1.78%
1982	118	−2.61%
1990	100	−2.05%
1999	77	−2.86%
2007	81	+0.64%
2012	87	+1.44%
2017	90	+0.68%
2023	95	+0.91%
Source: INSEE

== Sights ==
- The church dating from the fifteenth century.
- The château de La Terrade.

== See also ==
- Communes of the Creuse department
