= Châtelus-Malvaleix =

Commune in Nouvelle-Aquitaine, France

- Commune
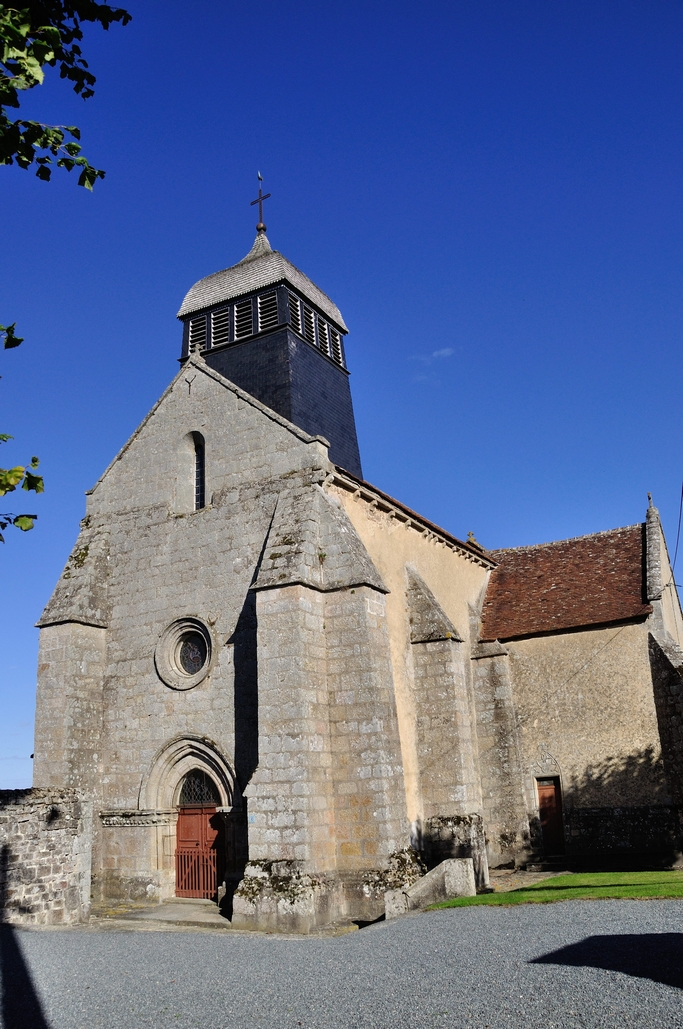
- The church in Châtelus-Malvaleix

- Coat of arms
- Location of Châtelus-Malvaleix
- Location within France Location within Nouvelle-Aquitaine
- Coordinates: 46°18′19″N 2°01′27″E
- Country: France
- Region: Nouvelle-Aquitaine
- Department: Creuse
- Arrondissement: Guéret
- Canton: Bonnat
- Intercommunality: CC Portes de la Creuse en Marche

Government
  - Mayor (2020–2026): Jean-François Bouchet
- Area^{1}: 14.97 km^{2} (5.78 sq mi)
- Elevation: 425 m (1,394 ft)
- Highest elevation: 541 m (1,775 ft)
- Lowest elevation: 325 m (1,066 ft)
- Population (2023): 545
  - Density: 36.4/km^{2} (94.3/sq mi)
- Time zone: UTC+01:00 (CET)
  - Summer (DST): UTC+02:00 (CEST)
- INSEE/Postal code: 23057 /23270
- ^{1} French Land Register data, which excludes lakes, ponds, glaciers > 1 km^{2} (0.386 sq mi or 247 acres) and river estuaries.

Châtelus-Malvaleix (French pronunciation: [ʃatly malvalɛ]; Occitan: Chasteluç Malvalés) is a commune in the Creuse department in the Nouvelle-Aquitaine region in central France.

== Geography ==
A village of farming, forestry, lakes and streams situated some 11 miles (18 km) northeast of Guéret, at the junction of the D3, D14, D40 and the D990 roads.

== Population ==
Historical population
Year	Pop.	±% p.a.
1968	710	—
1975	641	−1.45%
1982	585	−1.30%
1990	558	−0.59%
1999	569	+0.22%
2007	574	+0.11%
2012	582	+0.28%
2017	557	−0.87%
2023	545	−0.36%
Source: INSEE

== Sights ==
- The church, dating from the thirteenth century.

== See also ==
- Communes of the Creuse department
