= Tercillat =

Commune in Nouvelle-Aquitaine, France

- Commune
- Location of Tercillat
- Location within France Location within Nouvelle-Aquitaine
- Coordinates: 46°24′32″N 2°03′18″E
- Country: France
- Region: Nouvelle-Aquitaine
- Department: Creuse
- Arrondissement: Guéret
- Canton: Boussac
- Intercommunality: CC Portes de la Creuse en Marche

Government
  - Mayor (2020–2026): Béatrice Aussanaire Pilliot
- Area^{1}: 13.64 km^{2} (5.27 sq mi)
- Elevation: 392 m (1,286 ft)
- Highest elevation: 435 m (1,427 ft)
- Lowest elevation: 329 m (1,079 ft)
- Population (2023): 158
  - Density: 11.6/km^{2} (30.0/sq mi)
- Time zone: UTC+01:00 (CET)
  - Summer (DST): UTC+02:00 (CEST)
- INSEE/Postal code: 23252 /23350
- ^{1} French Land Register data, which excludes lakes, ponds, glaciers > 1 km^{2} (0.386 sq mi or 247 acres) and river estuaries.

Tercillat (French pronunciation: [tɛʁsija]; Occitan: Tercilhac) is a commune in the Creuse department in the Nouvelle-Aquitaine region in central France.

The seignurie of Tercillat was held by the noble family "de Noblet" from approximately 1576 to 1720 or more.

The feudal castle of Tercillat was a Commandery of the Knights Templar and the Order of Malta, consisting of conventual buildings, stables, oven, backyard, a fortified enclosure, towers, pits with the water, a drawbridge, a commandeur lodgings, a chapel, flanked by moats and dungeons. It was destroyed in the French Revolution. The ruins of the castle tower only remains. Le Chateau du Puy was built with stones from the castle.

== Geography ==
A farming area comprising the village and several hamlets situated some 16 miles (26 km) northeast of Guéret, at the junction of the D2, D88 and the D3a roads. The commune borders the Indre département.

== Population ==
Historical population
Year	Pop.	±% p.a.
1968	322	—
1975	279	−2.03%
1982	225	−3.03%
1990	206	−1.10%
1999	200	−0.33%
2007	175	−1.66%
2012	161	−1.65%
2017	158	−0.38%
2023	158	+0.00%
Source: INSEE

== Sights ==
- The church, rebuilt in the nineteenth century.
- The eighteenth-century Château du Puy.
- The ruins of the fourteenth-century chapel of Mas-St-Paul.
- The tower of the castle of Tercillat.

== See also ==
- Communes of the Creuse department
