= Bonnat, Creuse =

Commune in Nouvelle-Aquitaine, France

Bonnat
- Commune
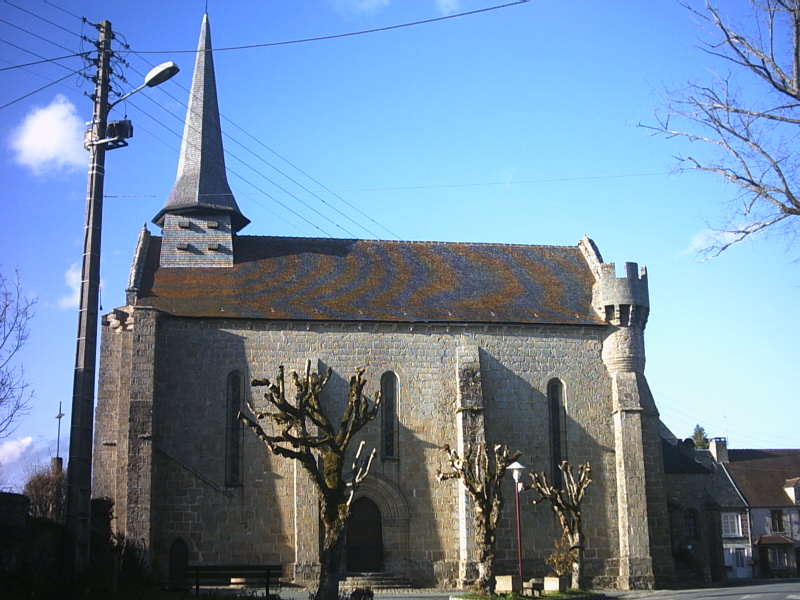
- The church in Bonnat

- Coat of arms
- Location of Bonnat
- Location within France Location within Nouvelle-Aquitaine
- Coordinates: 46°19′43″N 1°54′20″E
- Country: France
- Region: Nouvelle-Aquitaine
- Department: Creuse
- Arrondissement: Guéret
- Canton: Bonnat
- Intercommunality: CC Portes de la Creuse en Marche

Government
  - Mayor (2020–2026): Philippe Chavant
- Area^{1}: 45.79 km^{2} (17.68 sq mi)
- Elevation: 354 m (1,161 ft)
- Highest elevation: 515 m (1,690 ft)
- Lowest elevation: 248 m (814 ft)
- Population (2023): 1,357
  - Density: 29.64/km^{2} (76.76/sq mi)
- Time zone: UTC+01:00 (CET)
  - Summer (DST): UTC+02:00 (CEST)
- INSEE/Postal code: 23025 /23220
- ^{1} French Land Register data, which excludes lakes, ponds, glaciers > 1 km^{2} (0.386 sq mi or 247 acres) and river estuaries.

Bonnat (French pronunciation: [bɔna]; Occitan: Bònac) is a commune in the Creuse department in the Nouvelle-Aquitaine region in France.

== Geography ==
An area of farming and some associated light industry, comprising the village and several hamlets situated in the valley of the Petite Creuse, some 10 miles (16 km) north of Guéret, at the junction of the D6, D15 and the D56.

== Miscellany ==
The commune owns and manages a nearby chateau de Mornay which has its own racing circuit for cars and motorbikes and is used for corporate functions. It also owns a restaurant in the town near to the church.
A small stream flows by the southern border of the town on which stands a recently renovated lavoir (wash-house).
A recent development of a very large book repository on land owned by the commune has caused some concern locally because of extensive lorry traffic on the narrow rural roads.

== Population ==
Historical population
Year	Pop.	±% p.a.
1968	1,535	—
1975	1,340	−1.92%
1982	1,348	+0.09%
1990	1,387	+0.36%
1999	1,348	−0.32%
2007	1,311	−0.35%
2012	1,300	−0.17%
2017	1,315	+0.23%
2023	1,357	+0.53%
Source: INSEE

== Sights ==
- The church of St. Sylvain, dating from the thirteenth century.
- An ancient public washhouse.
- Three chateaux.
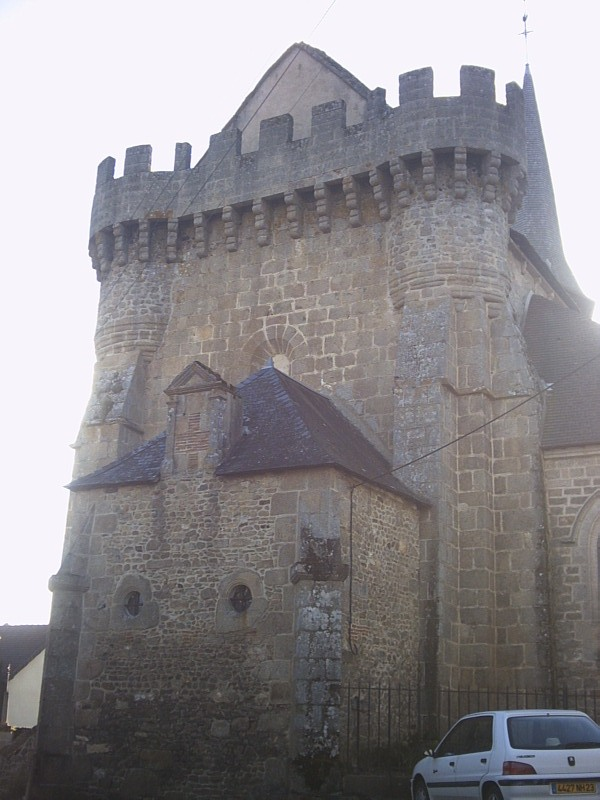
Fortifications of the church

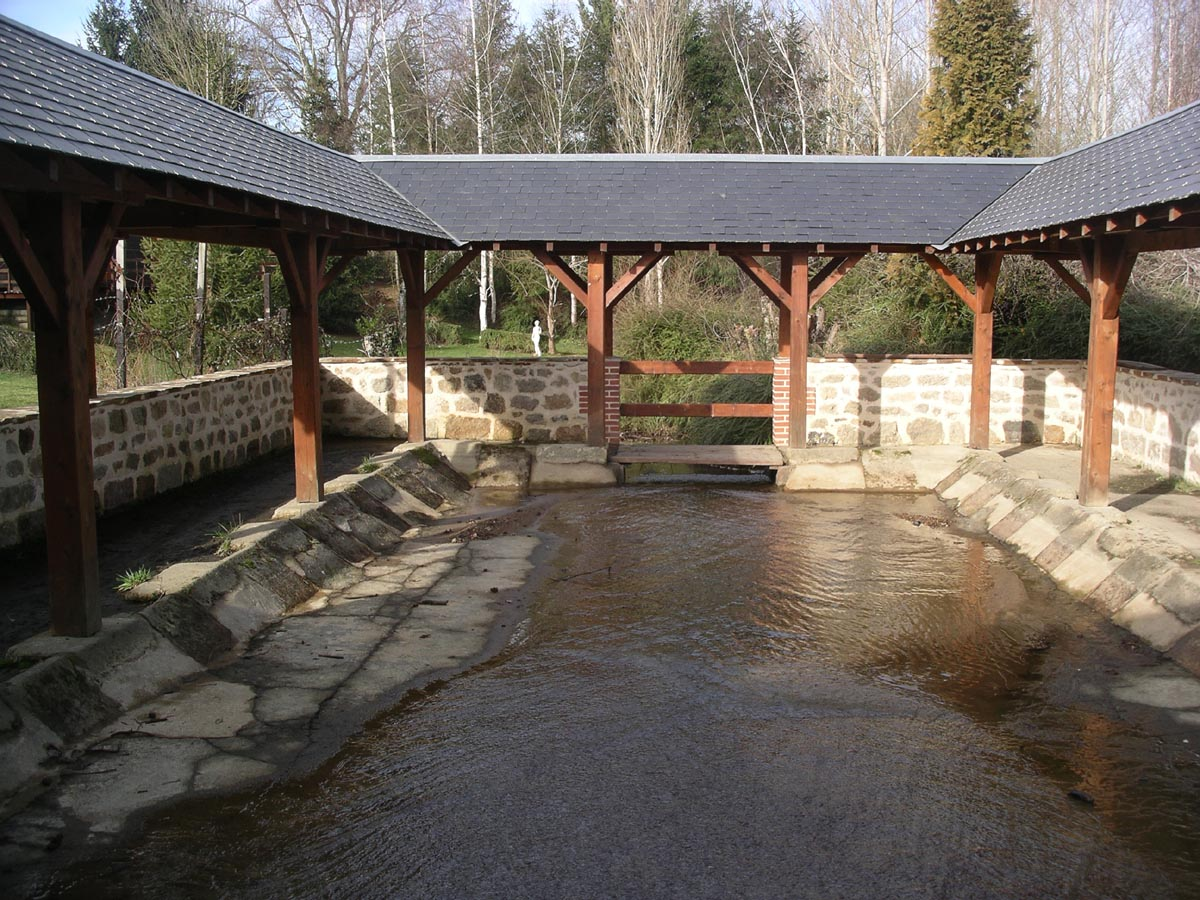
Recently restored Lavoir

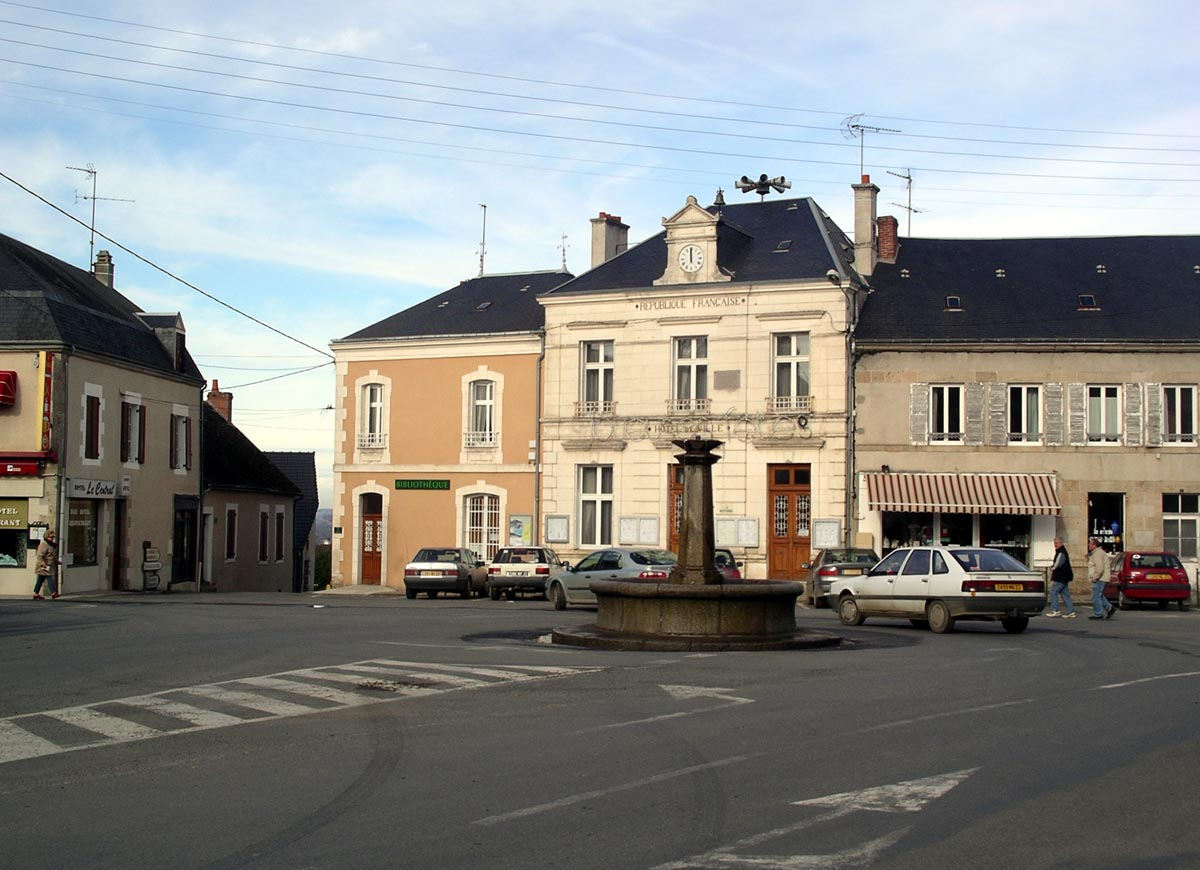
Village square

== See also ==
- Communes of the Creuse department
