= Canton of Bonnat =

Coordinates: 46°21′54″N 1°51′11″E

Bonnat
- Canton
- Interactive map of Bonnat
- Country: France
- Region: Nouvelle-Aquitaine
- Department: Creuse
- No. of communes: {{{nbcomm}}}
- Area: 380.16 km^{2} (146.78 sq mi)
- Population (2023): 7,251
  - Density: 19.07/km^{2} (49.40/sq mi)
- INSEE code: 23 04

The Canton of Bonnat is a canton situated in the Creuse département and in the Nouvelle-Aquitaine region of central France.

== Geography ==
An area of farming, quarrying and forestry in the arrondissement of Guéret, centred on the town of Bonnat. The altitude varies from 210m (Nouzerolles) to 515m (Bonnat) with an average altitude of 332m.

== Population ==
Historical population
Year	Pop.	±% p.a.
2013	7,330	—
2018	7,245	−0.23%
Source: INSEE

== Composition ==
At the French canton reorganisation which came into effect in March 2015, the canton was expanded from 13 to 18 communes (2 of which were merged into the new commune Linard-Malval):

- Bonnat
- Le Bourg-d'Hem
- La Cellette
- Chambon-Sainte-Croix
- Champsanglard
- Châtelus-Malvaleix
- Chéniers
- La Forêt-du-Temple
- Genouillac
- Linard-Malval
- Lourdoueix-Saint-Pierre
- Méasnes
- Mortroux
- Moutier-Malcard
- Nouziers
- Roches
- Saint-Dizier-les-Domaines

== See also ==
- Arrondissements of the Creuse department
- Cantons of the Creuse department
- Communes of the Creuse department
